= Miracles of Jesus =

Miracles attributed to Jesus

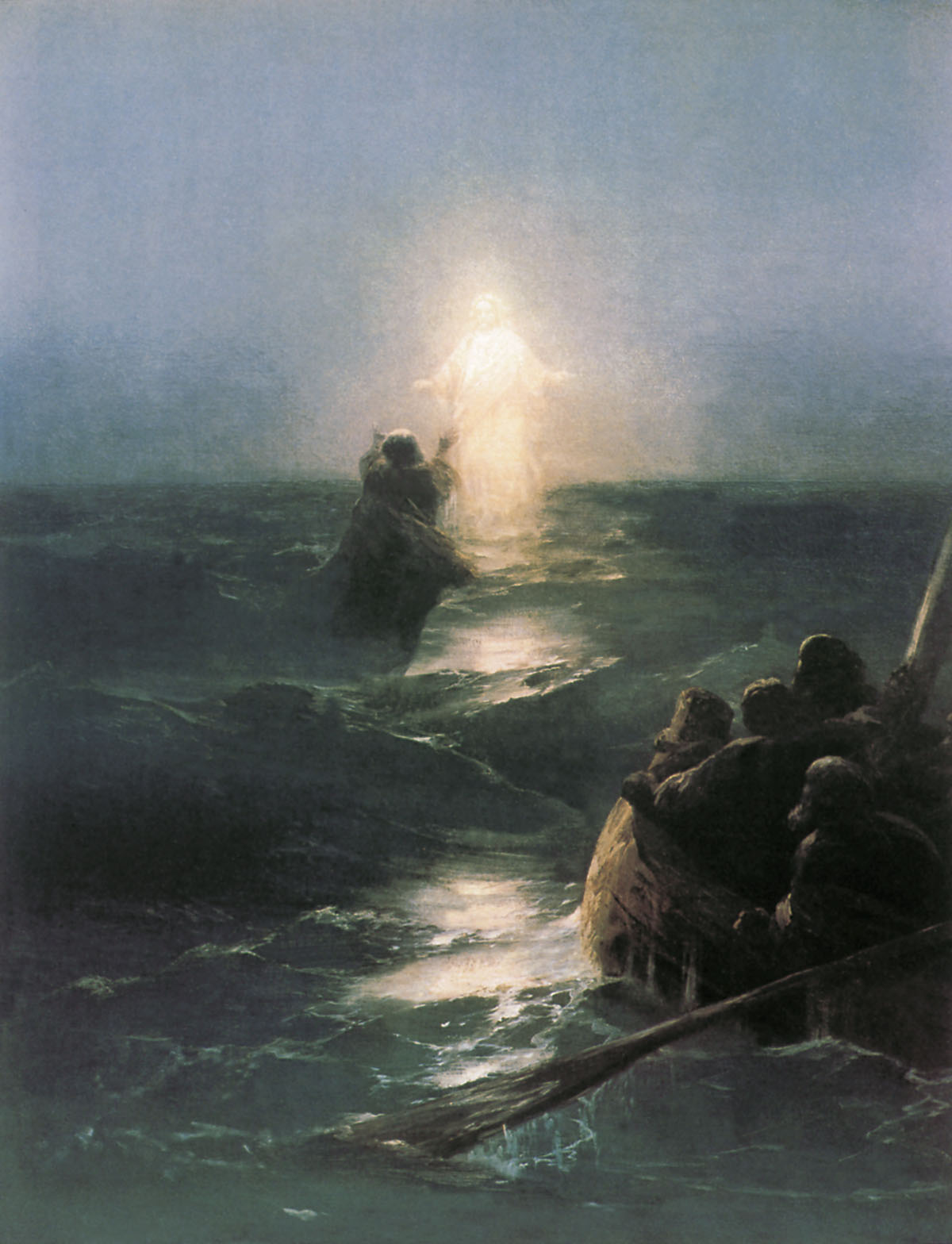
Jesus's miracle of walking atop the Sea of Galilee as depicted in Ivan Aivazovsky's Walking on Water, 1888

The miracles of Jesus are the many miraculous deeds attributed to Jesus in Christian texts, with the majority of these miracles being faith healings, exorcisms, resurrections, and control over nature.

In the Gospel of John, Jesus is said to have performed seven miraculous signs that characterize his ministry, from changing water into wine at the start of his ministry to raising Lazarus from the dead at the end.

For many Christians and Muslims, the miracles are believed to be actual historical events. Others, including many liberal Christians, consider these stories to be figurative. (Note: See discussion under § Liberal Christianity.)

Since the Age of Enlightenment, many scholars have taken a highly skeptical approach to claims about miracles. There is less agreement on the interpretation of miracles than in former times, though there is a scholarly consensus that the Historical Jesus was viewed as a miracle-worker during his lifetime. Non-religious historians commonly avoid commenting on the veracity of miracles as the sources are limited and considered problematic. Some scholars rule out miracles altogether while others defend the possibility, either with reservations or more strongly (in the latter case commonly reflecting religious views).

== Types and motives ==
In most cases, Christian authors associate each miracle with specific teachings that reflect the message of Jesus.

In The Miracles of Jesus, H. Van der Loos describes two main categories of miracles attributed to Jesus: those that affected people (such as Jesus healing the blind man of Bethsaida), or "healings", and those that "controlled nature" (such as Jesus walking on water). The three types of healings are cures, in which an ailment is miraculously remedied, exorcisms, in which demons are cast out of victims, and the resurrection of the dead. Karl Barth said that, among these miracles, the Transfiguration of Jesus is unique in that the miracle happens to Jesus himself.

According to Craig Blomberg, one characteristic shared among all miracles of Jesus in the Gospel accounts is that he delivered benefits freely and never requested or accepted any form of payment for his healing miracles, unlike some high priests of his time who charged those who were healed. In Matthew 10:8 he advised his disciples to heal the sick without payment and stated, "Freely ye received, freely give."

It is not always clear when two reported miracles refer to the same event. For example, in the healing the centurion's servant, the Gospels of Matthew and Luke narrate how Jesus healed the servant of a centurion in Capernaum at a distance. The Gospel of John has a similar but slightly different account at Capernaum and states that it was the son of a royal official who was cured at a distance.

=== Healing those who were ill and infirm ===
The largest group of miracles mentioned in the Gospels involves healing people who are ill, infirm or disabled. The Gospels give varying amounts of detail for each episode: sometimes Jesus cures simply by saying a few words; at other times, he employs material such as spit and mud. Luke 4:40 glosses over many healings at one time: "all those who ... were sick ... were brought to Him, and He laid His hands on every one of them and healed them."

==== Blind people ====
The canonical Gospels contain a number of stories about Jesus healing blind people. The earliest is a story of the healing of a blind man in Bethsaida in the Gospel of Mark.

Mark's gospel gives an account of Jesus healing a blind man named Bartimaeus as Jesus is leaving Jericho. Matthew's account doubles to two unnamed blind men while the Gospel of Luke tells the same story of Jesus healing an unnamed blind man as Jesus approaches Jericho. Ancient biographies could display differences and flexibility when reporting events, with the gospels being in line with the writing practices of antiquity.

The Gospel of John describes an episode in which Jesus heals a man blind from birth, placed during the Festival of Tabernacles, about six months before his crucifixion. Jesus mixes spittle with dirt to make a mud mixture, which he then places on the man's eyes. He instructs the man to wash his eyes in the Pool of Siloam. When the man does this, he is able to see. When asked by his disciples whether the cause of the blindness was the man's sins or his parents' sins, Jesus states that it was due to neither.

==== Lepers ====
A story in which Jesus cures a leper appears in Mark 1:40–45, Matthew 8:1–4 and Luke 5:12–16. Having cured the man, Jesus instructs him to offer the requisite ritual sacrifices as prescribed by the Deuteronomic Code and Priestly Code and to not tell anyone who had healed him. But the man disobeyed, increasing Jesus's fame, and thereafter Jesus withdrew to deserted places but was followed there.

In an episode in the Gospel of Luke (Luke 17:11–19), while on his way to Jerusalem, Jesus sends ten lepers who sought his assistance to the priests, and they were healed as they go, but the only one who comes back to thank Jesus is a Samaritan.

==== Paralytics ====
Healing the paralytic at Capernaum appears in Matthew 9:1–8, Mark 2:1–12 and Luke 5:17–26. The Synoptics state that a paralytic was brought to Jesus on a mat; Jesus told him to "get up and walk", and the man did so. Jesus also told the man that his sins were forgiven, which irritated the Pharisees. Jesus is described as responding to the anger by asking whether it is easier to say that someone's sins are forgiven, or to tell the man to "get up and walk". Mark and Luke state that Jesus was in a house at the time, and that the man had to be lowered through the roof by his friends due to the crowds blocking the door.

A similar cure is described in the Gospel of John as the healing the paralytic at Bethesda and occurs at the Pool of Bethesda. In this cure Jesus also tells the man to take his mat and walk.

==== Women ====
The curing of a bleeding woman appears in Mark 5:21–43, Matthew 9:18–26 and Luke 8:40–56, along with the miracle of the daughter of Jairus. The Gospels state that while heading to Jairus's house, Jesus was approached by a woman who had been bleeding for twelve years and that she touched Jesus's cloak (fringes of his garment) and was instantly healed. Jesus turned about and, when the woman came forward, said, "Daughter, your faith has healed you; go in peace".

The Synoptics describe Jesus as healing the mother-in-law of Simon Peter when he visited Simon's house in Capernaum, around the time of Jesus recruiting Simon as an Apostle (Mark records the event occurring just after the calling of Simon, while Luke records it just before). The Synoptics imply that this led other people to seek out Jesus.

Jesus healing an infirm woman appears in Luke 13:10–17. While teaching in a synagogue on the Sabbath, Jesus cured a woman who had been crippled by a spirit for eighteen years and could not stand straight at all.

==== Other healings ====
The healing of a man with dropsy is described in Luke 14:1–6. In this miracle, Jesus cured a man with dropsy at the house of a prominent Pharisee on the Sabbath. Jesus justified the cure by asking, "If one of you has a child or an ox that falls into a well on the Sabbath day, will you not immediately pull it out?"

In the healing of the man with a withered hand, the Synoptics state that Jesus entered a synagogue on Sabbath and found a man with a withered hand, whom Jesus healed, having first challenged the people present to decide what was lawful for Sabbath—to do good or to do evil, to save life or to kill. The Gospel of Mark adds that this angered the Pharisees so much that they started to contemplate killing Jesus.

The miraculous healing the deaf mute of Decapolis only appears in the Gospel of Mark. Mark states that Jesus went to the Decapolis, met a man there who was deaf and mute, and cured him. Specifically, Jesus first touched the man's ears, then touched his tongue after spitting, and then said, "Ephphatha!", an Aramaic word meaning "be opened".

The miraculous healing of a centurion's servant is reported in Matthew 8:5–13 and Luke 7:1–10. These two Gospels narrate how Jesus healed the servant of a centurion in Capernaum. John 4:46–54 has a similar account at Capernaum but states that it was the son of a royal official who was healed. In both cases the healing took place at a distance.

Jesus healing in the land of Gennesaret appears in Matthew 14:34–36 and Mark 6:53–56. As Jesus passes through Gennesaret all those who touch his cloak are healed.

Matthew 9:35–36 also reports that after the miracle of Jesus exorcising a mute, Jesus went through all the towns and villages, teaching in their synagogues, proclaiming the good news of the kingdom and healing every disease and sickness.

The healing of Malchus was Christ's final miracle before his resurrection. Simon Peter had cut off the ear of the High Priest's servant, Malchus, during the scene in the Garden of Gethsemane. Jesus restored the ear by touching it with his hand.

=== Exorcisms ===
According to the three Synoptic Gospels, Jesus performed many exorcisms of demons. These incidents are not mentioned in the Gospel of John and appear to have been excluded due to theological considerations.

The seven major exorcism accounts in the Synoptic Gospels which have details, and imply specific teachings, are as follows:

- Exorcism at the Synagogue in Capernaum—Jesus exorcises an evil spirit who cries out, "What do you want with us, Jesus of Nazareth? Have you come to destroy us? I know who you are—the Holy One of God!"
- Exorcism of the Gerasene demoniac or Miracle of the (Gadarene) Swine—Jesus exorcises a possessed man. When Jesus asks the demon's name (finding the name of the possessing demon was an important traditional tool of exorcists), he is given the reply Legion, "for we are many". When the demons ask to be expelled into a nearby group of pigs rather than be sent out of the area, Jesus obliges, but the pigs then run into the lake and drown.
- Exorcism of the Syrophoenician woman's daughter (Matthew 15:21–28 and Mark 7:24–30)—A Gentile woman asks Jesus to heal her daughter, but Jesus refuses, saying that he has been sent only to "the lost sheep of the house of Israel". The woman persists, saying that "dogs eat of the crumbs which fall from their masters' table". In response Jesus relents and informs her that her daughter has been healed.
- Exorcising the blind and mute man (Matthew 12:22–32, Mark 3:20–30, and Luke 11:14–23)—Jesus heals a possessed man who is blind and mute. People are astonished and ask, "Could this be the Son of David?"
- Exorcising a boy possessed by a demon (Matthew 17:14–21, Mark 9:14–29, and Luke 9:37–49)—A boy possessed by a demon is brought forward to Jesus. The boy is said to have foamed at the mouth, gnashed his teeth, become rigid, and involuntarily fallen into both water and fire. Jesus's followers could not expel the demon, and Jesus condemns the people as unbelieving, but when the father of the boy questions if Jesus could heal the boy, he replies "everything is possible for those that believe". The father then says that he believes and the child is healed.
- Jesus exorcising at sunset (Matthew 8:16–17, Mark 1:32–34, and Luke 4:40–41)—This miracle appears in the Synoptic Gospels just after Jesus heals Simon Peter's mother-in-law. In this miracle, Jesus heals people and casts out demons.
- Jesus exorcising a mute (Matthew 9:32–34)—This miracle immediately follows the account of Jesus healing two blind men. A man who is possessed and can not talk is brought to Jesus, who casts out the demon. The man is then able to speak.

There are also brief mentions of other exorcisms, such as the following:

- Jesus casts seven devils out of Mary Magdalene. (Mark 16:9, Luke 8:2)
- Jesus continues to cast out devils even though Herod Antipas wants to kill him. (Luke 13:31–32)

=== Resurrection of the dead ===
All four canonical gospels describe the resurrection of Jesus; three of them also relate a separate occasion on which Jesus calls a dead person back to life:

- Daughter of Jairus. Jairus, a major patron of a synagogue, asks Jesus to heal his daughter, but while Jesus is on the way, Jairus is told his daughter has died. Jesus tells him she was only sleeping and wakes her with the words Talitha kum!
- The Young Man from Nain. A young man, the son of a widow, is brought out for burial in Nain. Jesus sees her, and his pity causes him to tell her not to cry. Jesus approaches the coffin and tells the man inside to get up, and he does so.
- The Raising of Lazarus. A close friend of Jesus who had been dead for four days is brought back to life when Jesus commands him to get up.

=== Harmony with nature ===
The Gospels include eight pre-resurrection accounts concerning Jesus's power over nature:

- Turning water into wine at a wedding, when the host runs out of wine, the host's servants fill vessels with water at Jesus's command, then a sample is drawn out and taken to the master of the banquet who pronounces the content of the vessels as the best wine of the banquet.
- The miraculous catch of fish takes place early in Jesus's ministry and results in Saint Peter, Saint Andrew, James, son of Zebedee, and John the Apostle joining Jesus as his apostles.
- Walking on water – Jesus walks on water.
- Calming the storm – during a storm, the disciples woke Jesus, and he rebuked the storm causing it to become calm. Jesus then rebukes the disciples for lack of faith.
- Finding a coin in the fish's mouth is reported in Matthew 17:24–27.
- Cursing the fig tree – Jesus cursed a fig tree, and it withered.

Post-resurrection miracles attributed to Jesus are also recorded in the Gospels:

- A miracle similar to the miraculous catch of fish, also called the catch of 153 fish to distinguish it from the account in Luke, is reported in the Gospel of John but takes place after the Resurrection of Jesus.

== List of miracles found outside the New Testament ==
=== The Book of Mormon ===
The Book of Mormon, one of the religious texts of the Church of Jesus Christ of Latter-day Saints, records multiple miracles performed by Jesus. Sometime shortly after his Ascension, the Book of Mormon records that Jesus miraculously descends from heaven and greets a large group of people who immediately bow down to him. Jesus offers this invitation: "Arise and come forth unto me, that ye may thrust your hands into my side, and also that ye may feel the prints of the nails in my hands and in my feet, that ye may know that I am the God of Israel, and the God of the whole earth, and have been slain for the sins of the world" 3 Nephi 11:8–17.

In addition to descending from heaven, other miracles of Jesus found in the Book of Mormon include the following:

- Healing the "lame, or blind, or halt, or maimed, or leprous, or that are withered, or that are deaf, or that are afflicted in any manner" 3 Nephi 17:7–10.
- Providing bread and wine as emblems of his sacrifice and death to the multitude when neither had been brought 3 Nephi 20:3–7.
- Changing the nature of three of his called twelve disciples in the Book of Mormon so that they could live until his Second Coming and the other nine that they would live until the age of 72 and be taken "up to his kingdom" 3 Nephi 28:1–23.

=== Infancy Gospels ===
Accounts of Jesus performing miracles are also found outside the New Testament. Later, 2nd century texts, called Infancy Gospels, narrate Jesus performing miracles during his childhood.

Miracle	Sources
Rich young man raised from the dead- parallels the Lazarus story of John 11	Secret Gospel of Mark 1
Water controlled and purified	Infancy Thomas 2.2
Made birds of clay and brought them to life	Infancy Thomas 2.3
Resurrected dead playmate Zeno	Infancy Thomas 9
Healed a woodcutter's foot	Infancy Thomas 10
Held water in his cloak	Infancy Thomas 11
Harvested 100 bushels of wheat from a single seed	Infancy Thomas 12
Stretched a board that was short for carpentry	Infancy Thomas 13
Resurrected a teacher he earlier struck down	Infancy Thomas 14–15
Resurrected a dead child	Infancy Thomas 17
Resurrected a dead man	Infancy Thomas 18
Healed James' viper bite	Infancy Thomas 19
Miraculous Virgin Birth verified by midwife	Infancy James 19–20

=== The Quran ===
Miracles performed by Jesus are mentioned in two sections of the Quran, suras 3:49 and 5:110. Both passages state that Jesus healed lepers and the blind, as well as raised people from the dead. Both also mention a miracle involving Jesus forming birds from clay and breathing life into them, which is also referenced in the Infancy Gospel of Thomas.

=== Apocryphal Gospels ===
The Egerton Gospel, also known as the Unknown Gospel, is a fragmentary gospel consisting of four passages on papyrus fragments that largely line up with passages in the Gospel of John in their contents; most scholars place P. Egerton 2 after the gospel of John was written, and many scholars argue that it is dependent on the canonical gospels. The final fragment, however, has no equivalent in the canonical gospels, and details a miracle in which Jesus stands at the bank of the Jordan River and posits how the abundance of something hidden can become immeasurable, before causing a spontaneous ripening of fruit plants from the water.

== Setting and interpretations ==
=== Cultural background ===
Miracles were widely believed in around the time of Jesus. Gods and demigods such as Heracles (better known by his Roman name, Hercules), Asclepius (a Greek physician who became a god) and Isis of Egypt all were thought to have healed the sick and overcome death (i.e., to have raised people from the dead). Some thought that mortal men, if sufficiently famous and virtuous, could do likewise; there were myths about philosophers like Pythagoras and Empedocles calming storms at sea, chasing away pestilences, and being greeted as gods, and similarly some Jews believed that Elisha the Prophet had cured lepers and restored the dead. The achievements of the 1st century Apollonius of Tyana, though occurring after Jesus's life, were used by a 3rd-century opponent of the Christians to argue that Christ was neither original nor divine (Eusebius of Caesaria argued against the charge).

The first Gospels were written against this background of Hellenistic and Jewish belief in miracles and other wondrous acts as signs—the term is explicitly used in the Gospel of John to describe Jesus's miracles—seen to be validating the credentials of divine wise men.

=== Traditional Christian interpretation ===
Many Christians believe Jesus's miracles were historical events and that his miraculous works were an important part of his life, attesting to his divinity and the Hypostatic union, i.e., the dual natures of Jesus as God and Man. They see Jesus's experiences of hunger, weariness, and death as evidences of his humanity, and miracles as evidences of his divinity.

Christian authors also view the miracles of Jesus not merely as acts of power and omnipotence, but as works of love and mercy, performed not with a view to awe by omnipotence, but to show compassion for sinful and suffering humanity. And each miracle involves specific teachings.

Since according to the Gospel of John, it was impossible to narrate all of the miracles performed by Jesus, the Catholic Encyclopedia states that the miracles presented in the Gospels were selected for a twofold reason: first for the manifestation of God's glory, and then for their evidential value. Jesus referred to his "works" as evidences of his mission and his divinity, and in John 5:36 he declared that his miracles have greater evidential value than the testimony of John the Baptist. John 10:37–38 quotes Jesus as follows:

Do not believe me unless I do what my Father does. But if I do it, even though you do not believe me, believe the miracles, that you may know and understand that the Father is in me, and I in the Father.

In Christian teachings, the miracles were as much a vehicle for Jesus's message as his words. Many emphasize the importance of faith, for instance in cleansing ten lepers, Jesus did not say: "My power has saved you," but said:

Rise and go; your faith has saved you.

Similarly, in the miracle of walking on water, Apostle Peter learns an important lesson about faith in that as his faith wavers, he begins to sink.

Christian authors have discussed the miracles of Jesus at length and assigned specific motives to each miracle. For example, authors Pentecost and Danilson suggest that the miracle of walking on water centered on the relationship of Jesus with his apostles rather than their peril or the miracle itself. In their view, the miracle was specifically designed by Jesus to teach the apostles that when encountering obstacles, they need to rely on their faith in Christ, first and foremost.

Authors Donahue and Harrington argue that the healing of Jairus's daughter teaches that faith, as embodied in the bleeding woman, can exist in seemingly hopeless situations and that through belief, healing can be achieved, in that when the woman is healed, Jesus tells her, "Your faith has healed you".

=== Liberal Christianity ===
Liberal Christians place less emphasis on miraculous events associated with the life of Jesus than on his teachings. The effort to remove superstitious elements from Christian faith dates to intellectual reformist Christians such as Erasmus and the Deists in the 15th–17th centuries. In the 19th century, self-identified liberal Christians sought to elevate Jesus's humane teachings as a standard for a world civilization freed from cultic traditions and traces of pagan belief in the supernatural. The debate over whether a belief in miracles was mere superstition or essential to accepting the divinity of Christ constituted a crisis within the 19th-century church, for which theological compromises were sought.

Attempts to account for miracles through scientific or rational explanation were mocked even at the turn of the 19th–20th century. A belief in the authenticity of miracles was one of five tests established in 1910 by the Presbyterian Church in the United States of America to distinguish true believers from what they saw as false professors of faith such as "educated, 'liberal' Christians."

Contemporary liberal Christians may prefer to read Jesus's miracles as metaphorical narratives for understanding the power of God. Not all theologians with liberal inclinations reject the possibility of miracles, but may reject the polemicism that denial or affirmation entails.

Among other changes, Thomas Jefferson excised all the miracles of Jesus from his Jefferson Bible.

=== Nonreligious views ===
The Scottish philosopher David Hume published an influential essay on miracles in his An Enquiry Concerning Human Understanding (1748) in which he argued that any evidence for miracles was outweighed by the possibility that those who described them were deceiving themselves or others:

As the violations of truth are more common in the testimony concerning religious miracles, than in that concerning any other matter of fact; this must diminish very much the authority of the former testimony, and make us form a general resolution, never to lend any attention to it, with whatever specious pretence it may be covered.

Historian Will Durant attributes Jesus's miracles to "the natural result of suggestion—of the influence of a strong and confident spirit upon impressionable souls; similar phenomena may be observed any week at Lourdes".

Russian scientist Kirill Eskov, in The Gospel of Afranius, presented a fictional materialist reconstruction in which the Roman authorities stage Jesus's resurrection and convince the apostles that they had seen the risen Christ.

=== Scholarly views ===
Scholars are divided on the interpretation of miracles; some rule them out a priori, while others defend their possibility or reality. There is a consensus that the Historical Jesus was viewed as a miracle-worker during his lifetime. New Testament scholar Bart Ehrman argues that though some historians believe that miracles have happened and others do not, due to the limitations of the sources, it is not possible for historians to affirm or deny them. He states "This is not a problem for only one kind of historian—for atheists or agnostics or Buddhists or Roman Catholics or Baptists or Jews or Muslims; it is a problem for all historians of every stripe." According to Michael Licona, among general historians there are some postmodern views of historiography that are open to the investigation of miracles.

According to the Jesus Seminar, Jesus probably cured some sick people, but described Jesus's healings in modern terms, relating them to "psychosomatic maladies." They found six of the nineteen healings to be "probably reliable". Most participants in the Jesus Seminar believe Jesus practiced exorcisms, as Josephus, Philostratus and others wrote about other contemporary exorcists, but do not believe the gospel accounts were accurate reports of specific events or that demons exist. They did not find any of the nature miracles to be historical events.

According to scholar Maurice Casey, it is fair to assume that Jesus was able to cure people affected with psychosomatic disorders, although he believes that the healings were likely due to naturalistic causes and placebo effects. John P. Meier believes that Jesus as healer is as well supported as almost anything about the historical Jesus. In the Gospels, the activity of Jesus as miracle worker looms large in attracting attention to himself and reinforces his eschatological message. Such activity, Meier suggests, might have added to the concern of authorities that culminated in Jesus's death. E.P. Sanders and Géza Vermes also agree that Jesus was indeed a healer and that this helped increase his following among the people of his time.

In the field of philosophy of religion, Timothy and Lydia McGrew treat the resurrection of Jesus as the central miracle in a cumulative probabilistic argument based on multiple lines of historical testimony.

== Gallery of miracles ==
=== Cures ===
Healing the mother of Peter's wife

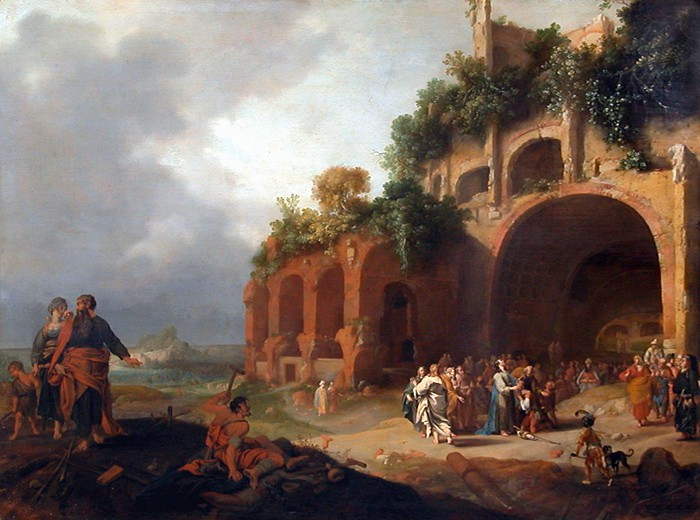
Healing the deaf mute of Decapolis

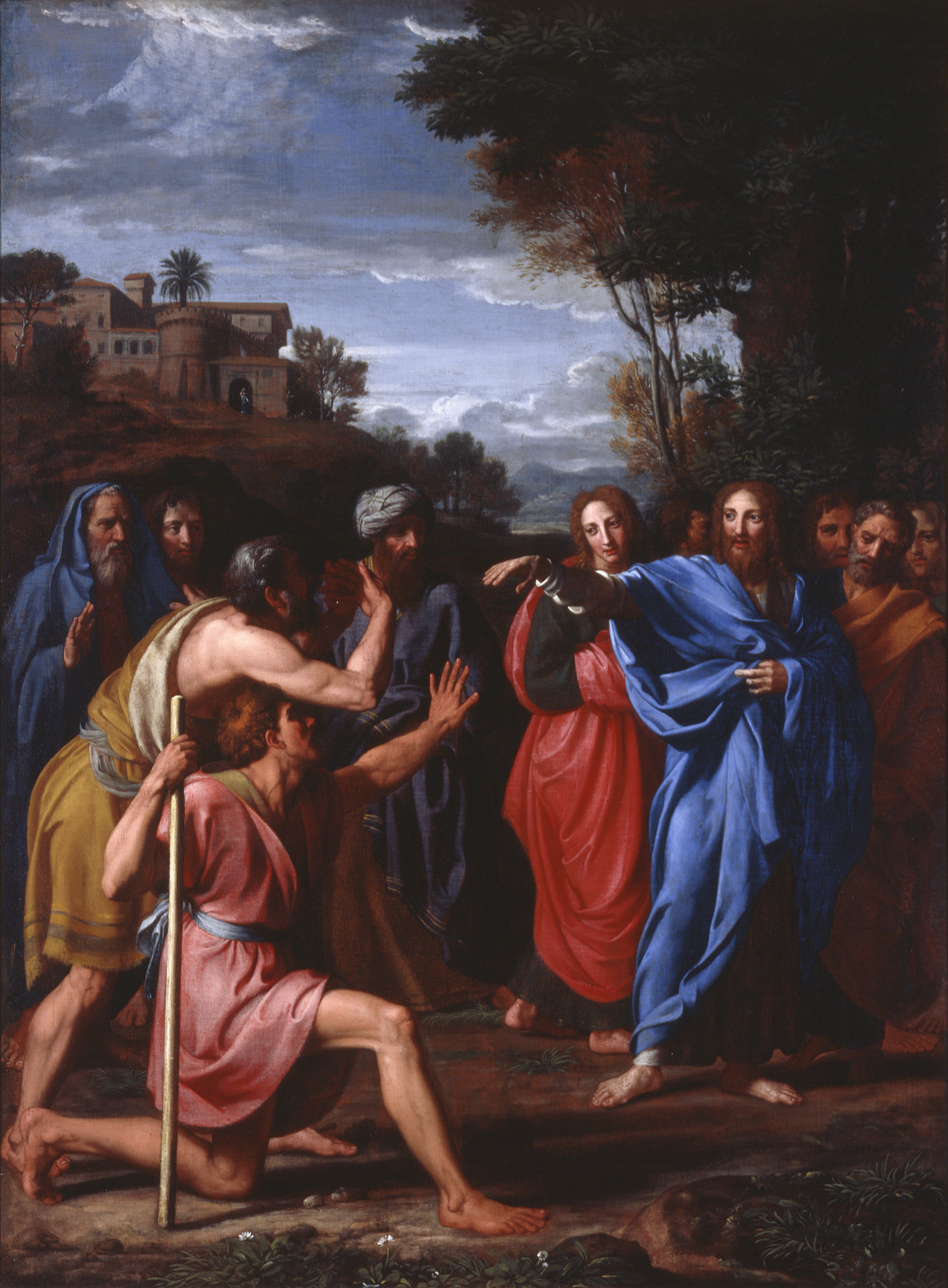
Healing the blind at birth

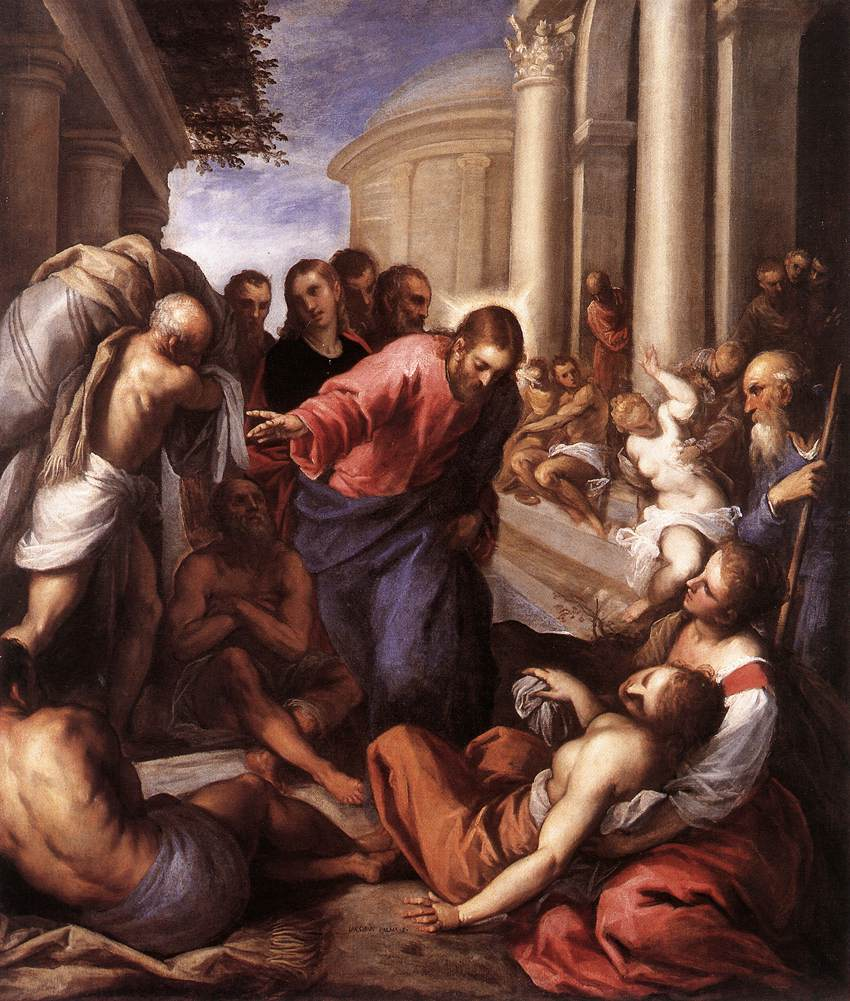
Healing the Paralytic at Bethesda

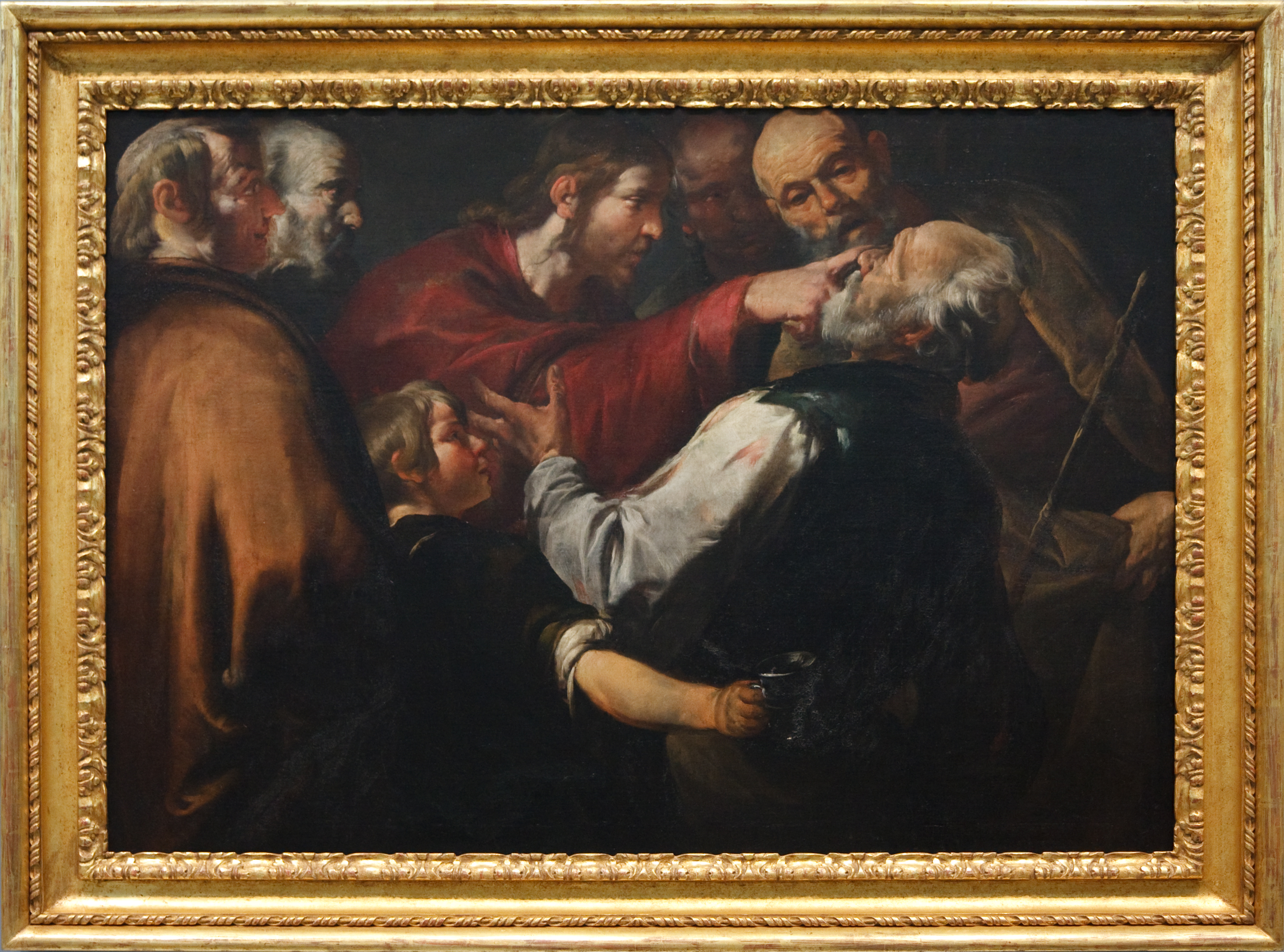
The Blind Man of Bethsaida

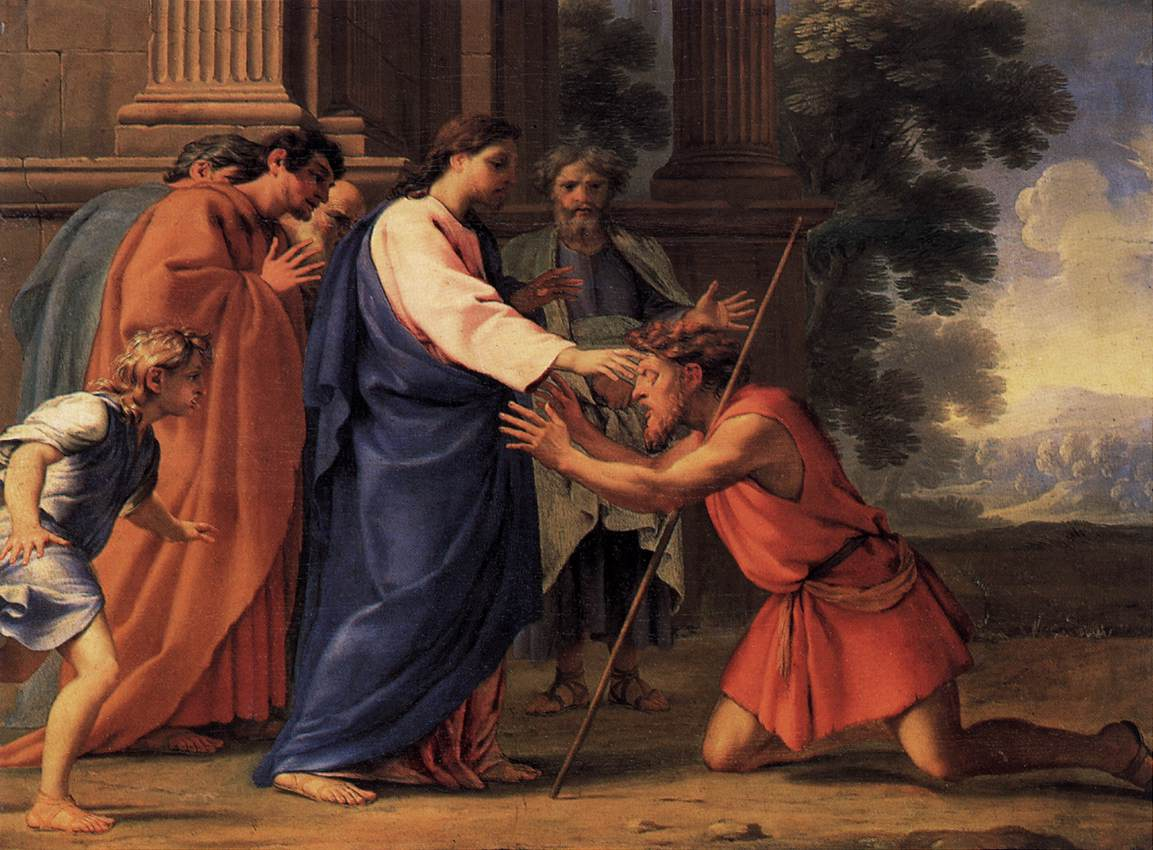
The Blind man Bartimaeus in Jericho

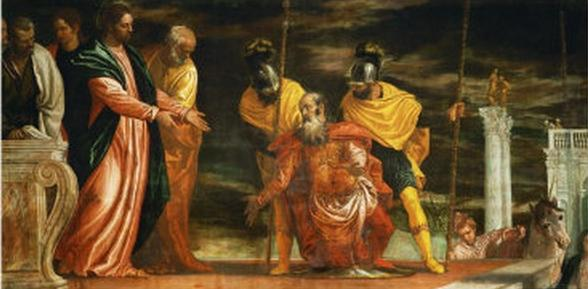
Healing the Centurion's servant

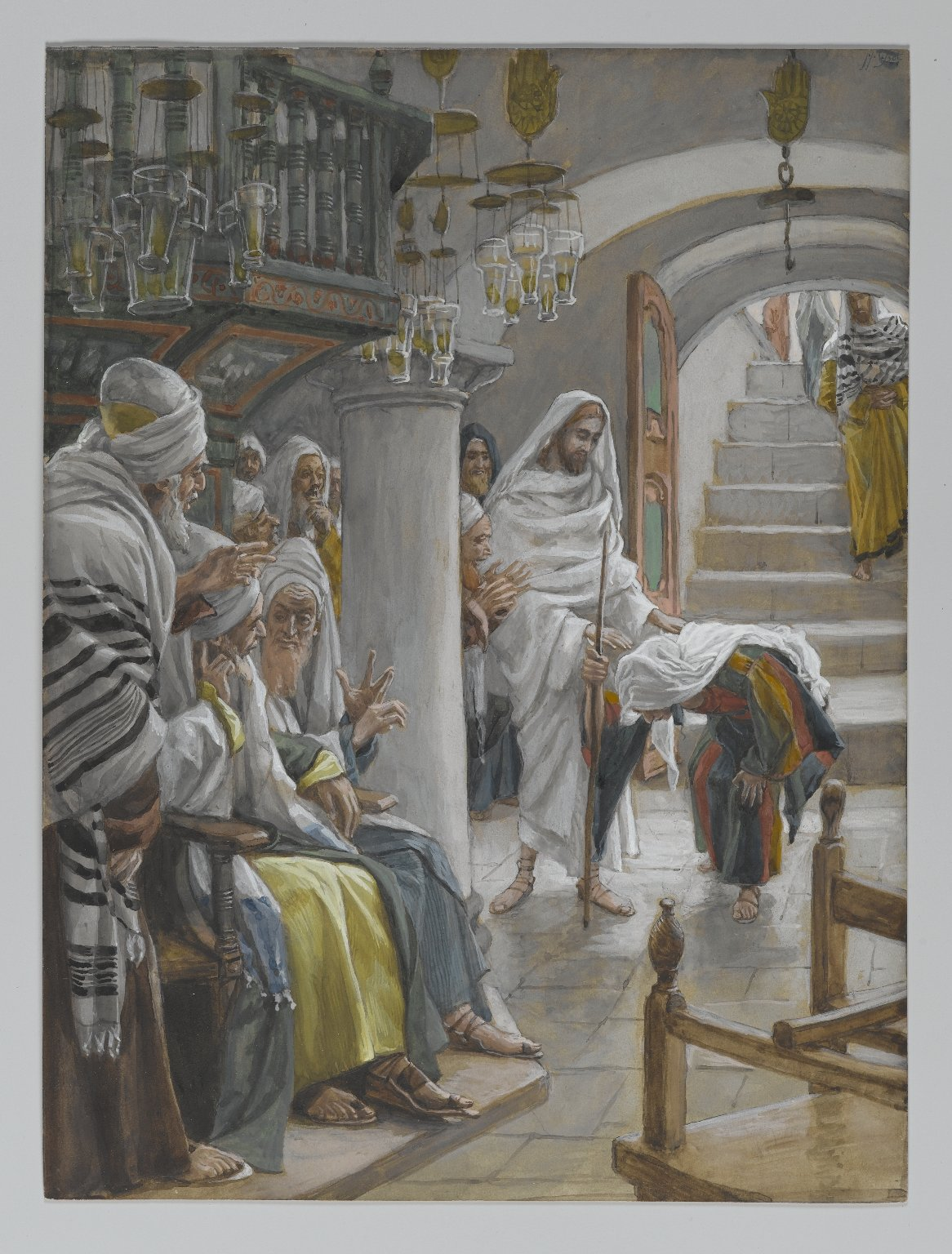
Christ healing an infirm woman

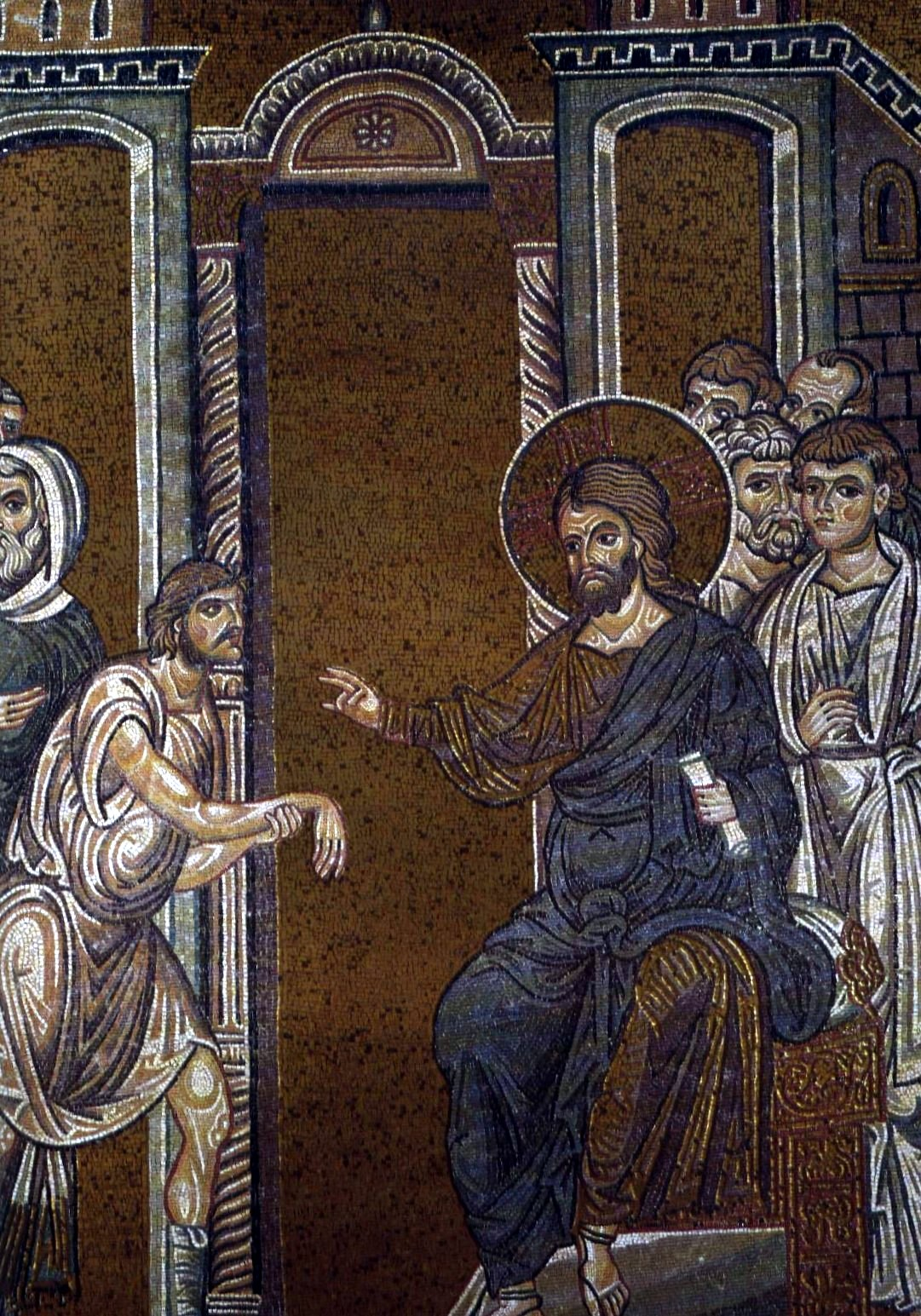
The man with a withered hand

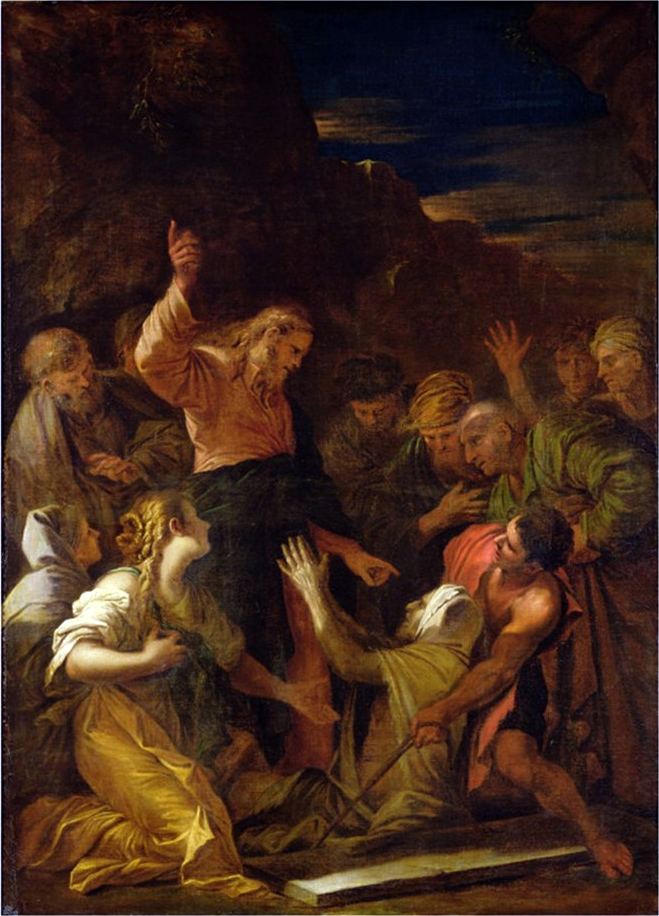
Cleansing a leper

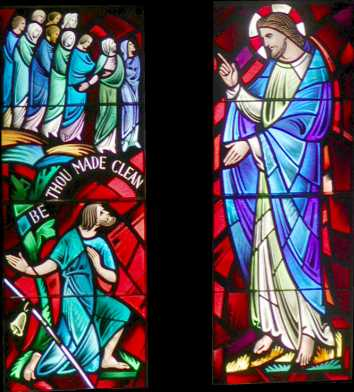
Cleansing ten lepers

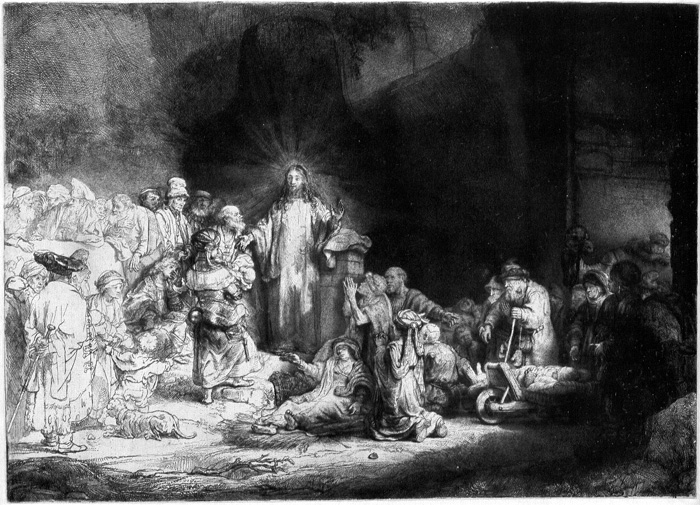
Healing a man with dropsy

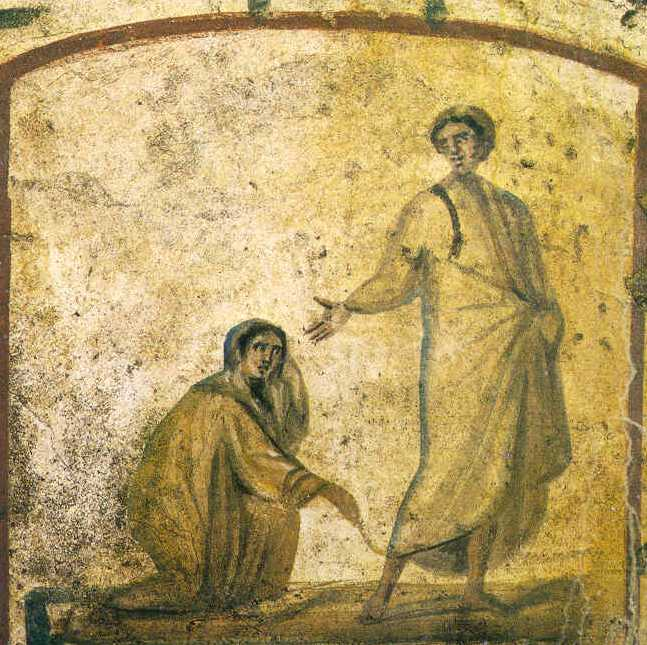
Healing the bleeding woman

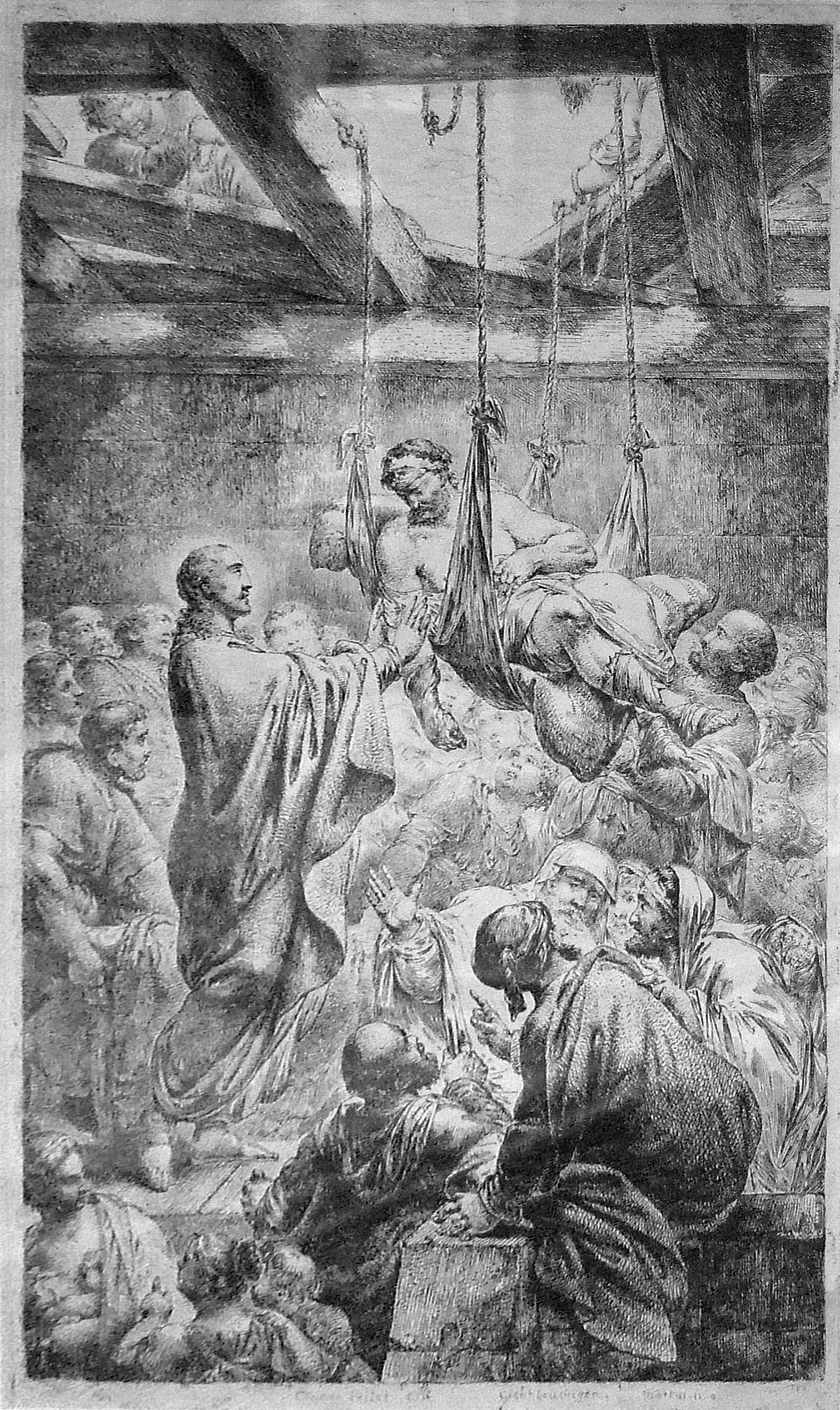
Healing the paralytic at Capernaum

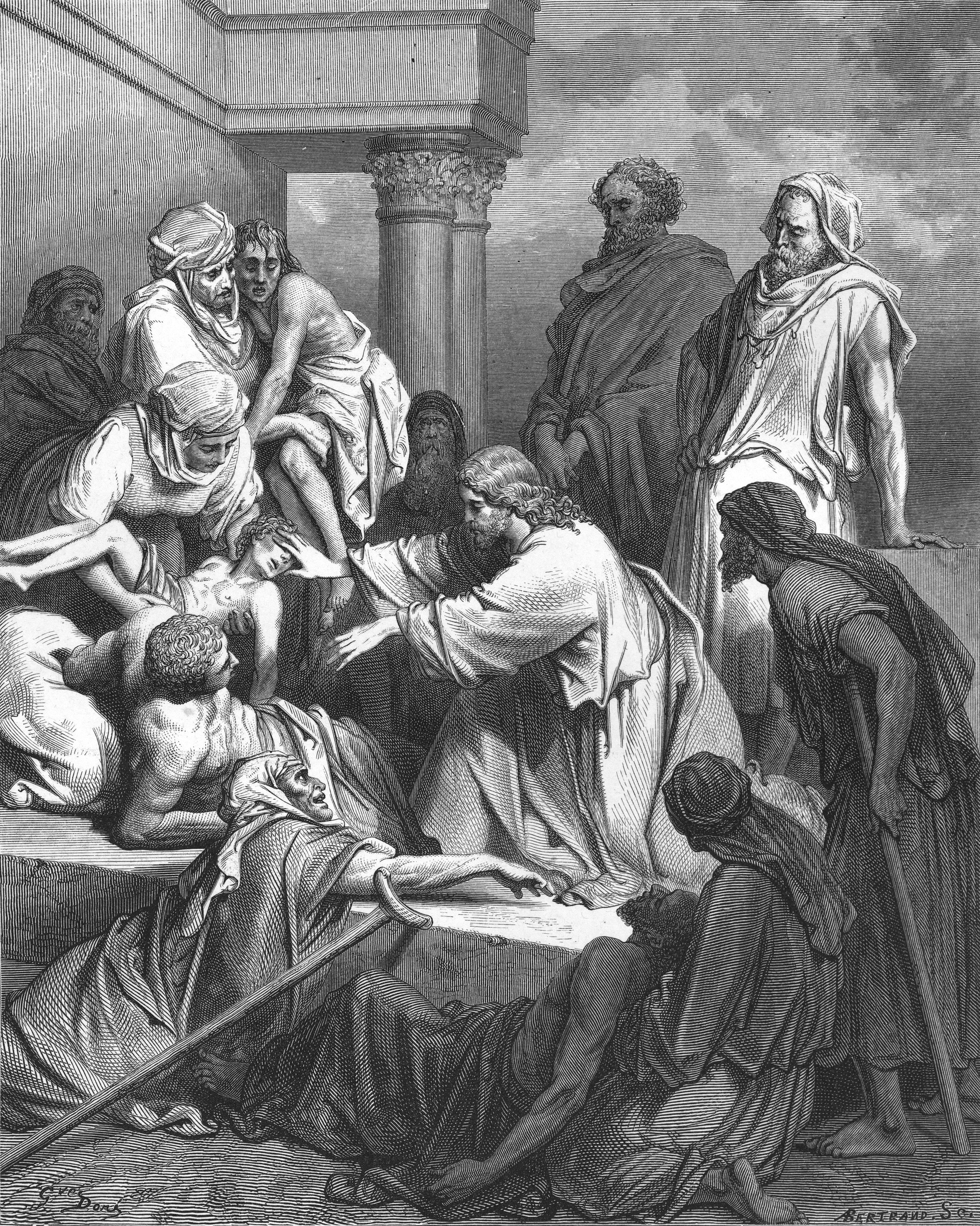
Healing in Gennesaret

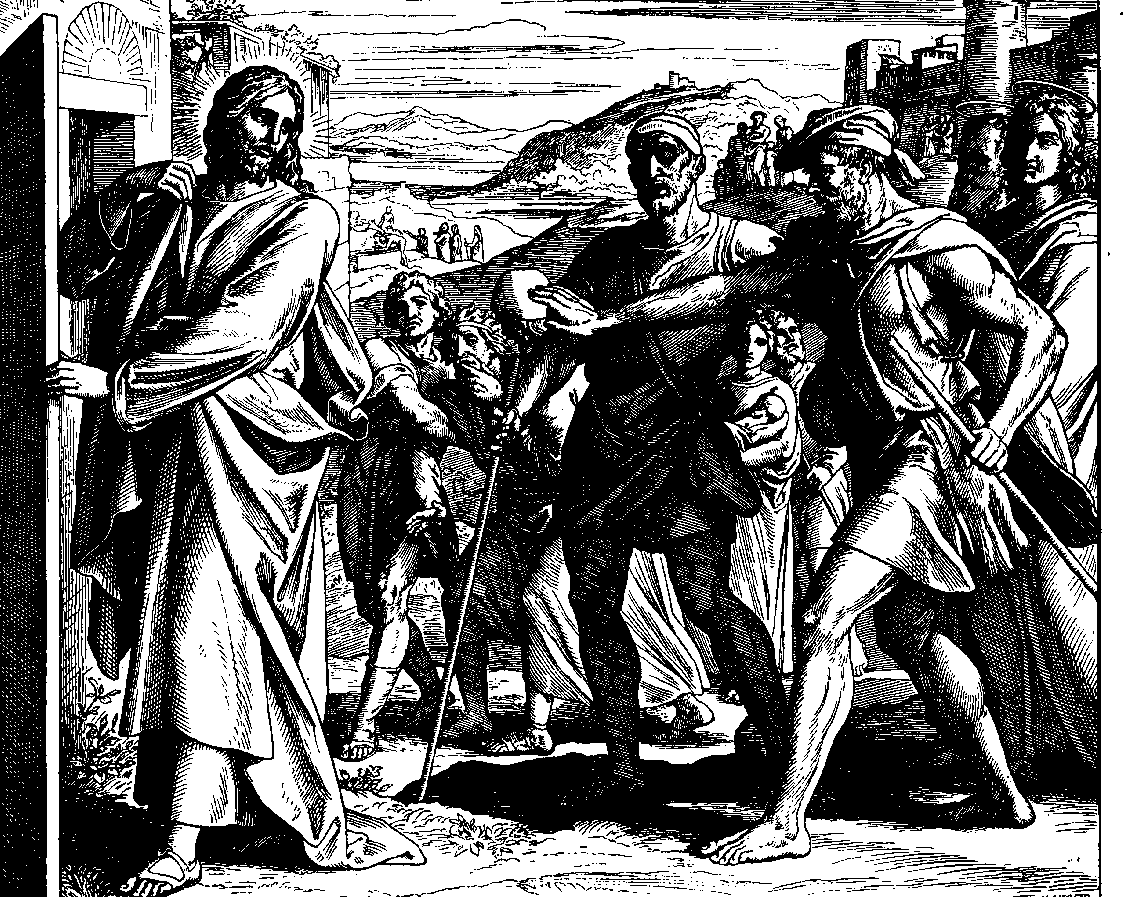
Two blind men

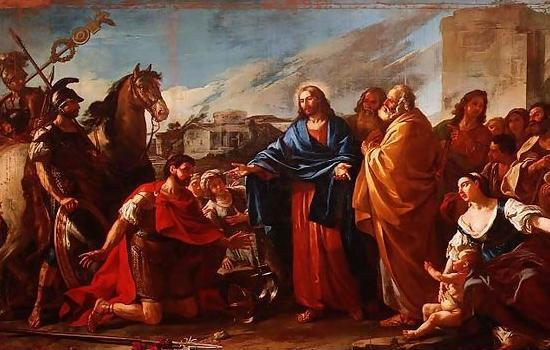
Healing the royal official's son

=== Power over demonic spirits ===
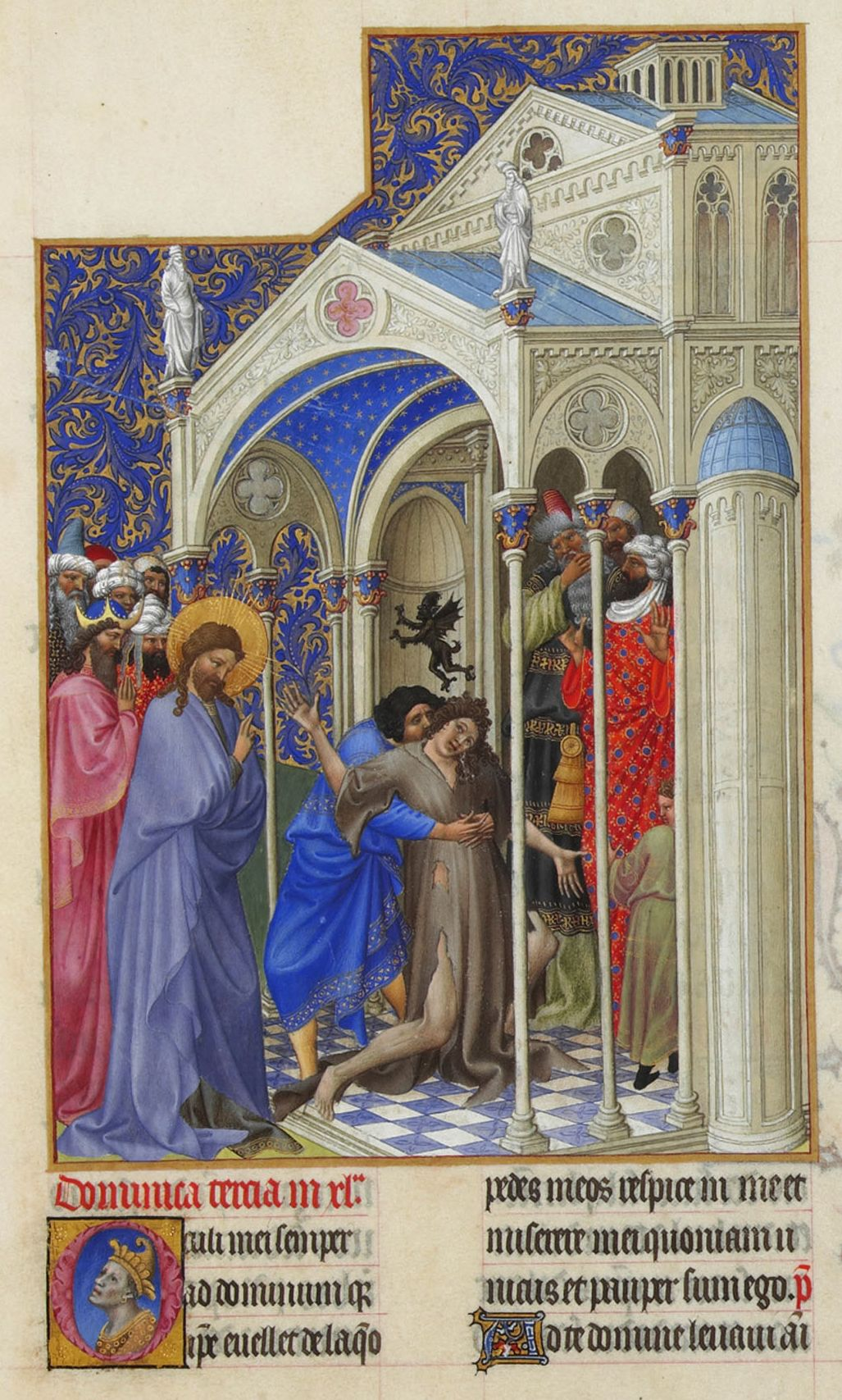
A boy possessed by a demon

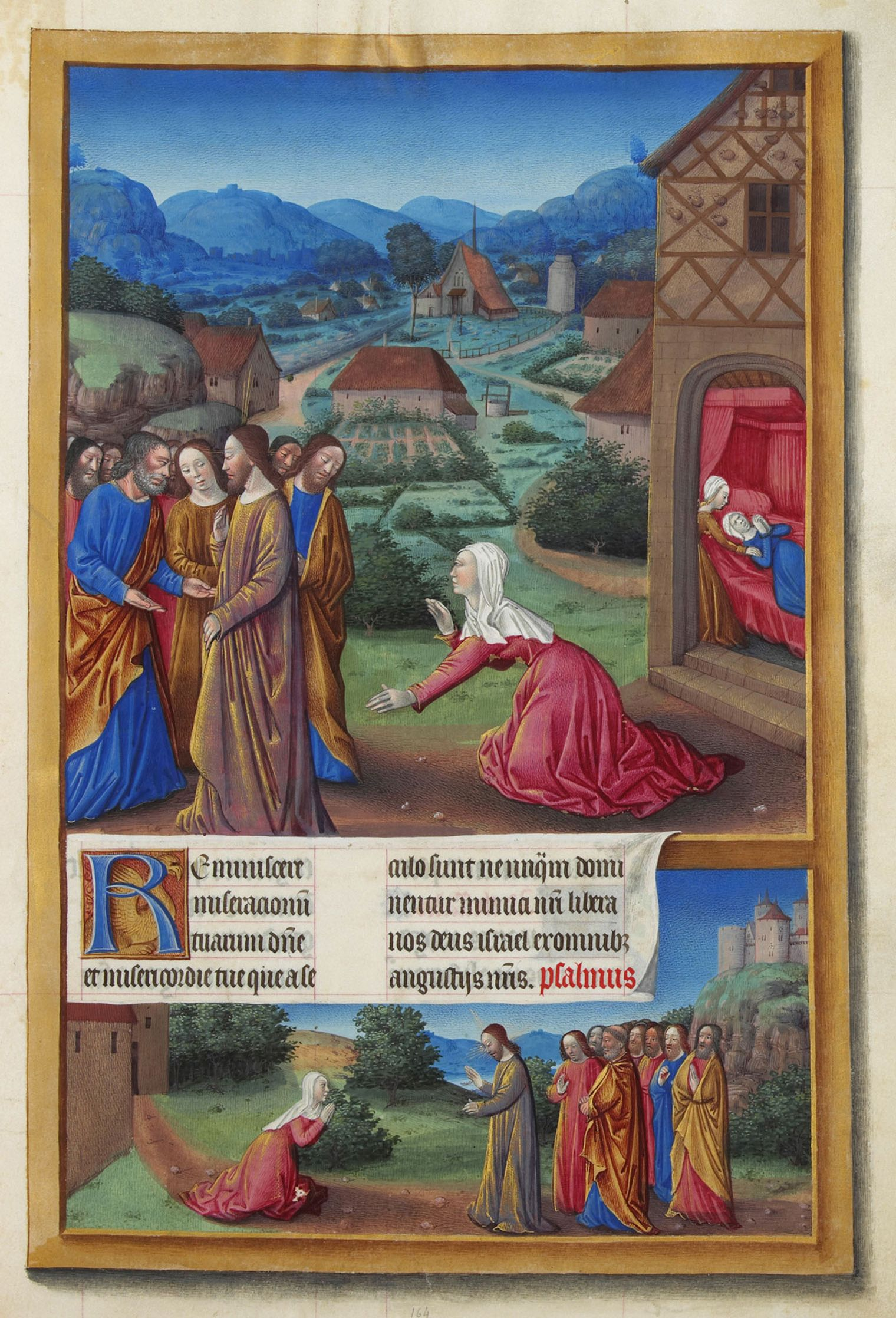
The Canaanite woman's daughter

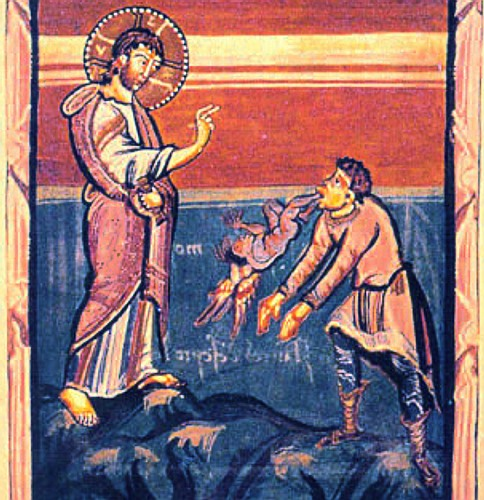
The Gerasenes demonic

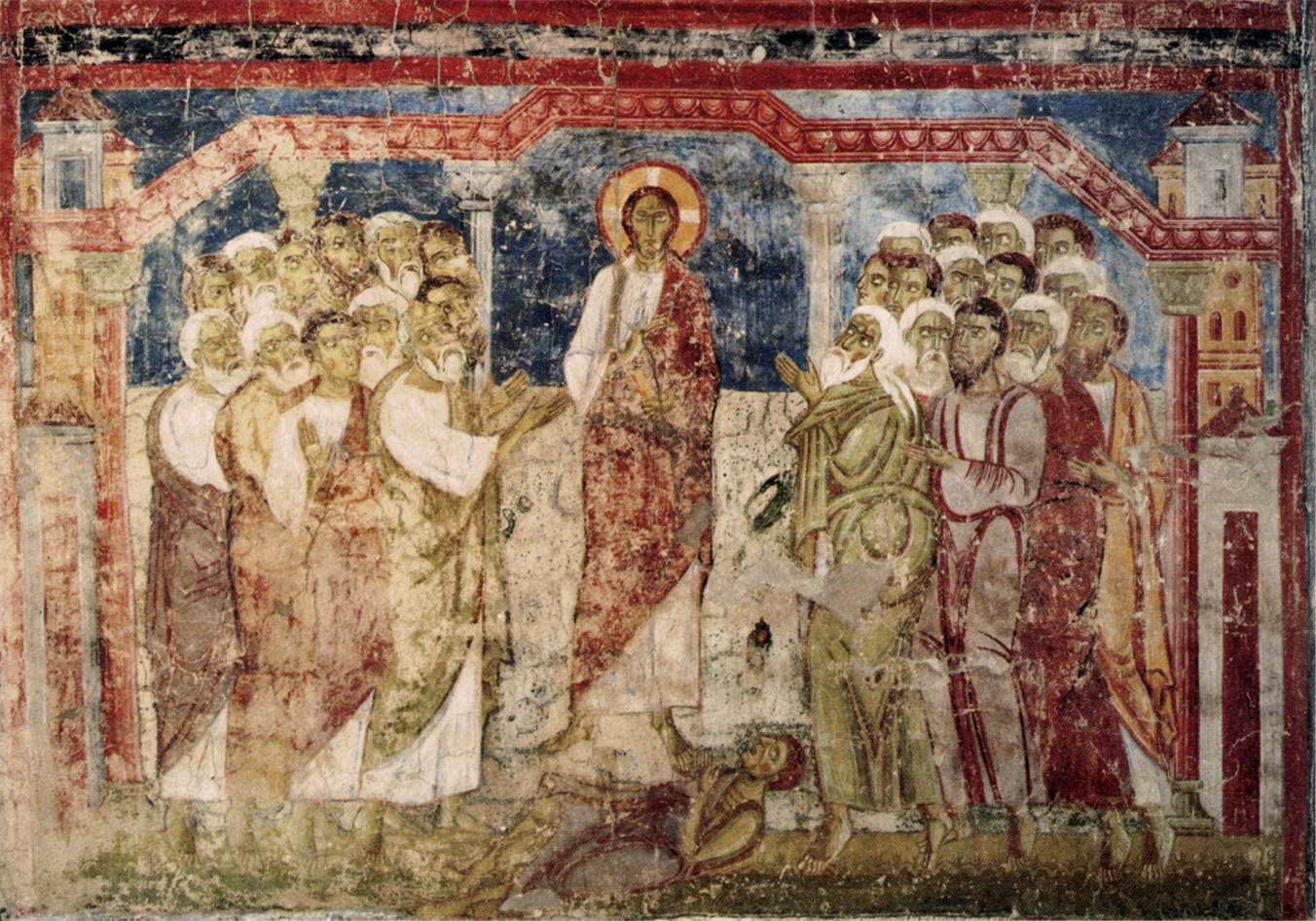
At the Synagogue in Capernaum

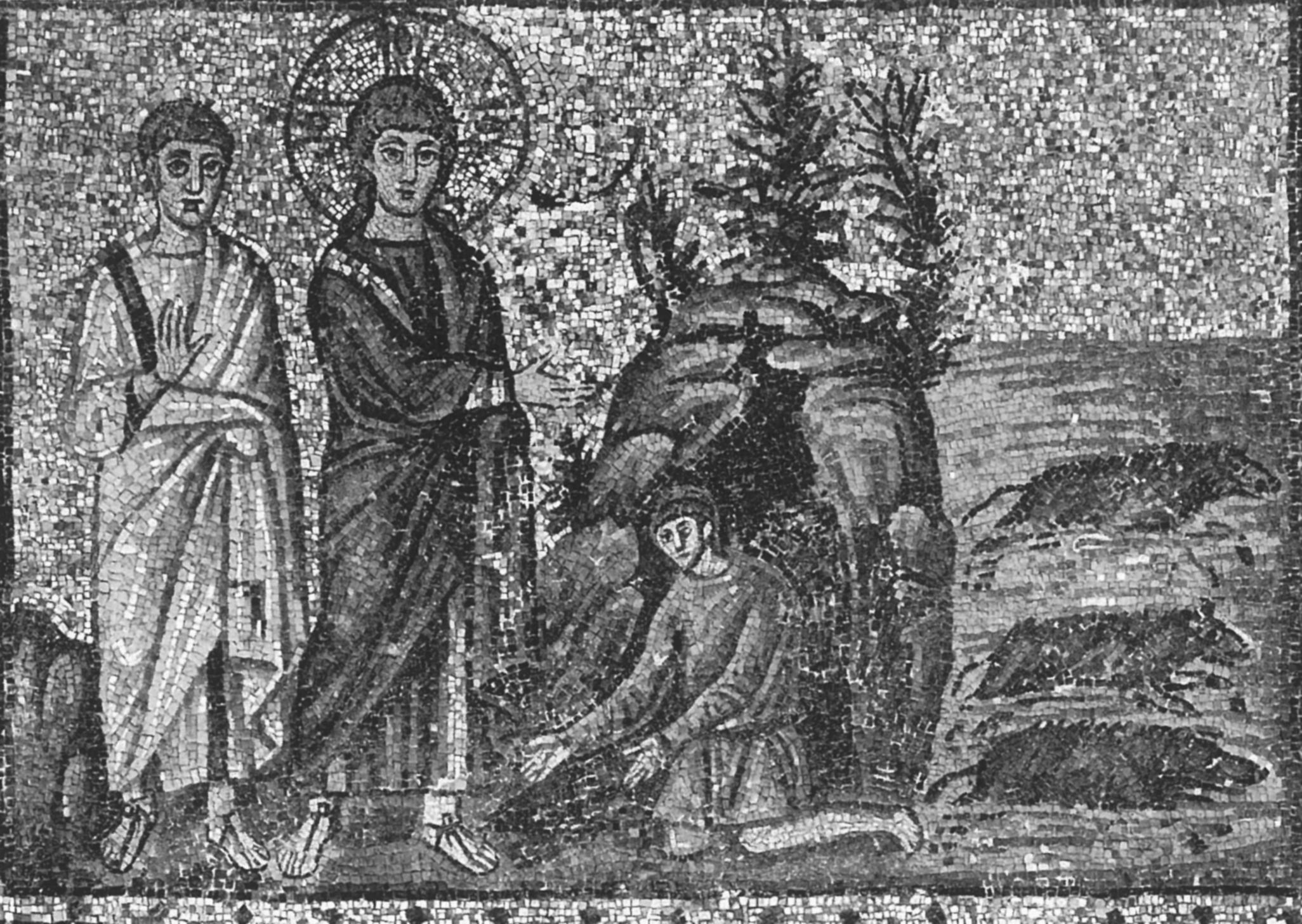
Christ exorcising at sunset

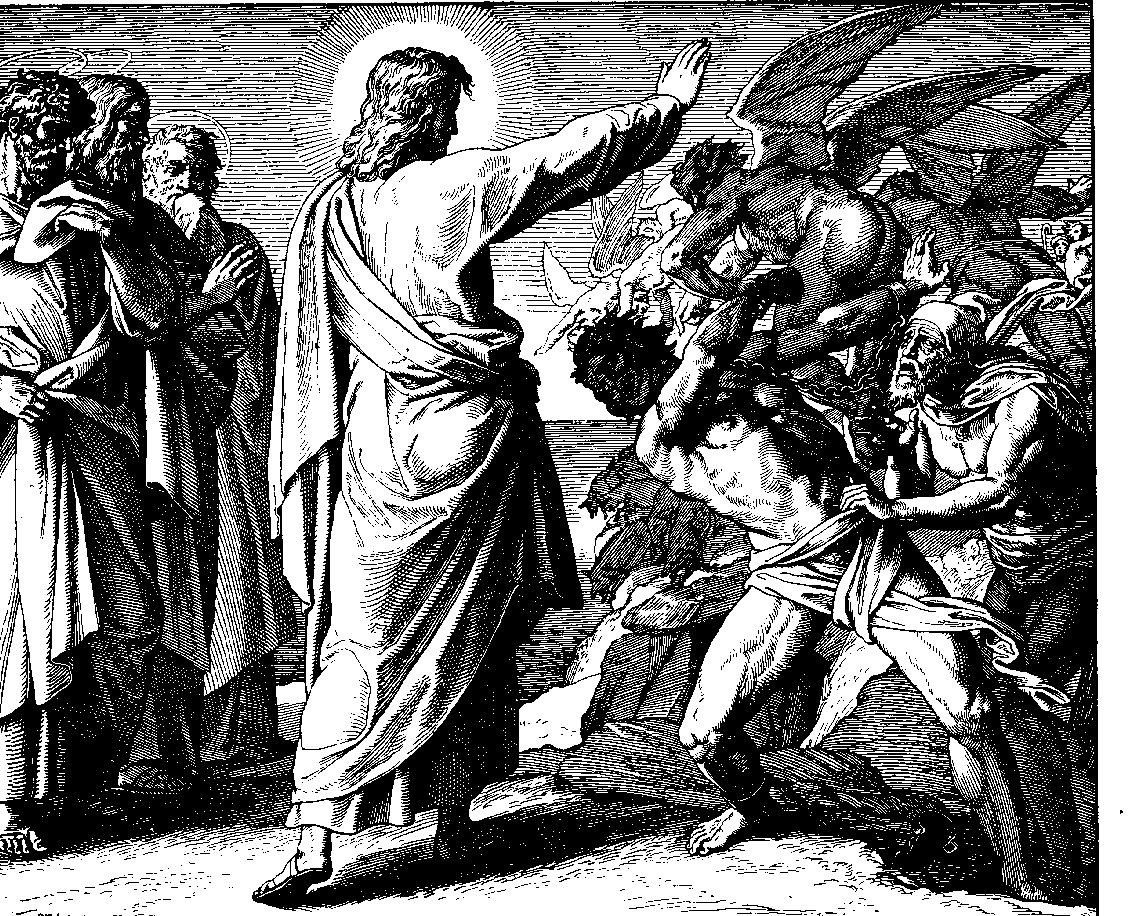
Exorcism of the Gerasene demoniac

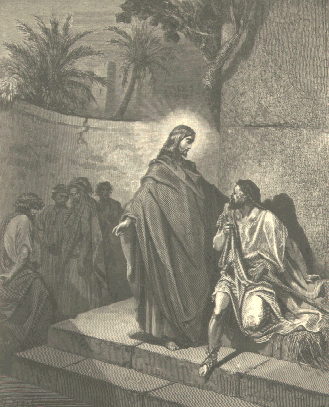
Exorcising a mute

=== Resurrection of the dead ===
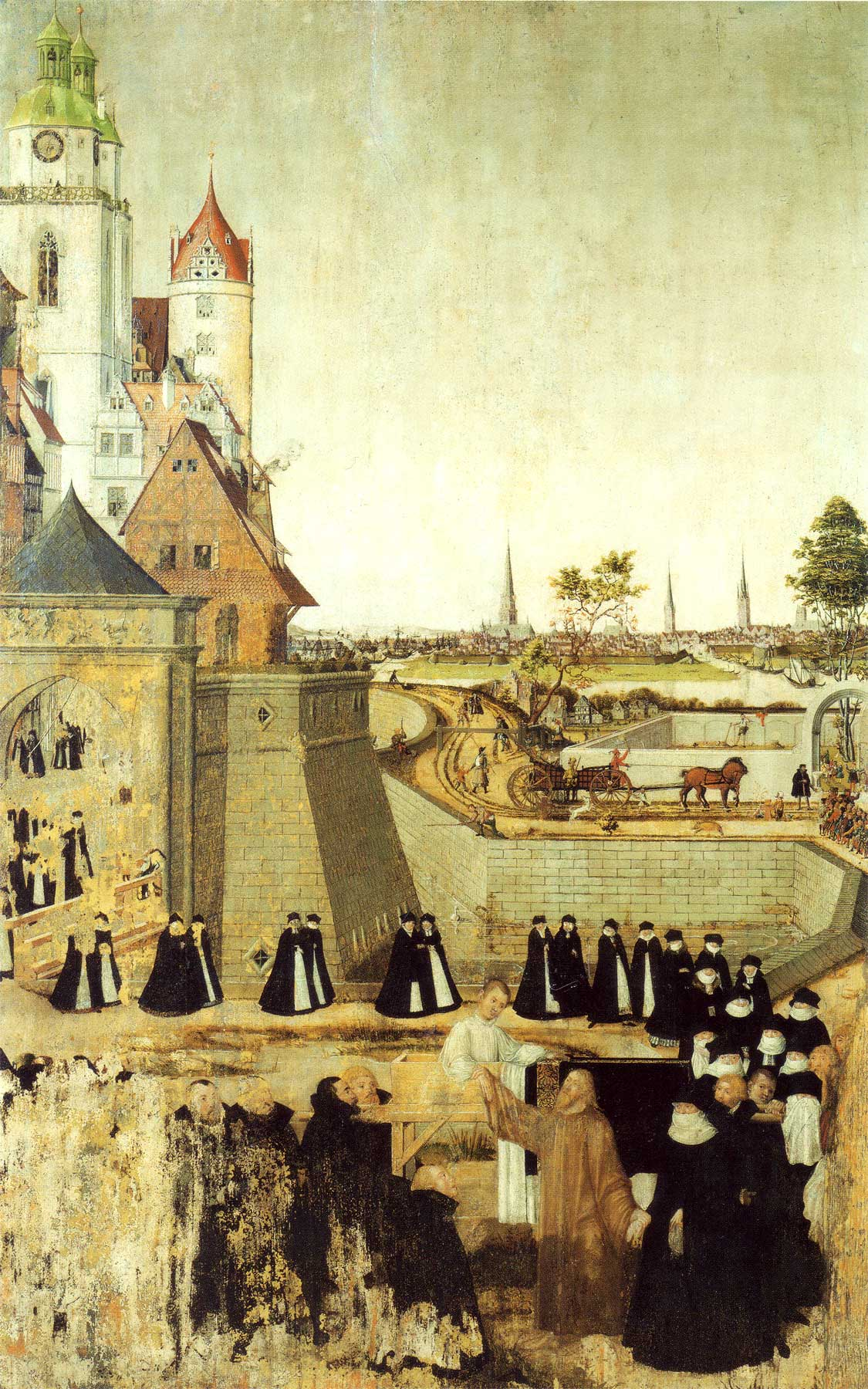
Young Man from Nain

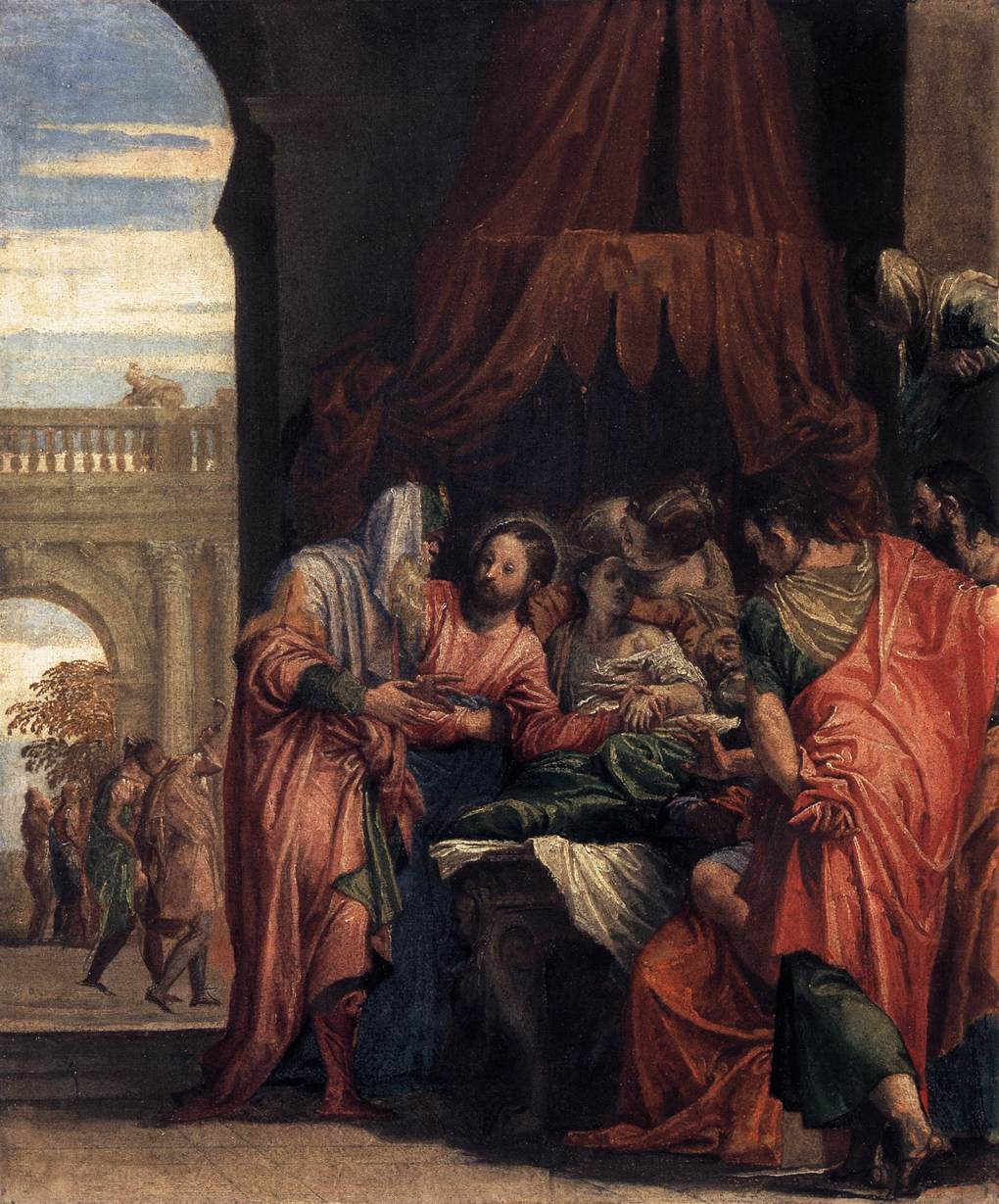
Daughter of Jairus

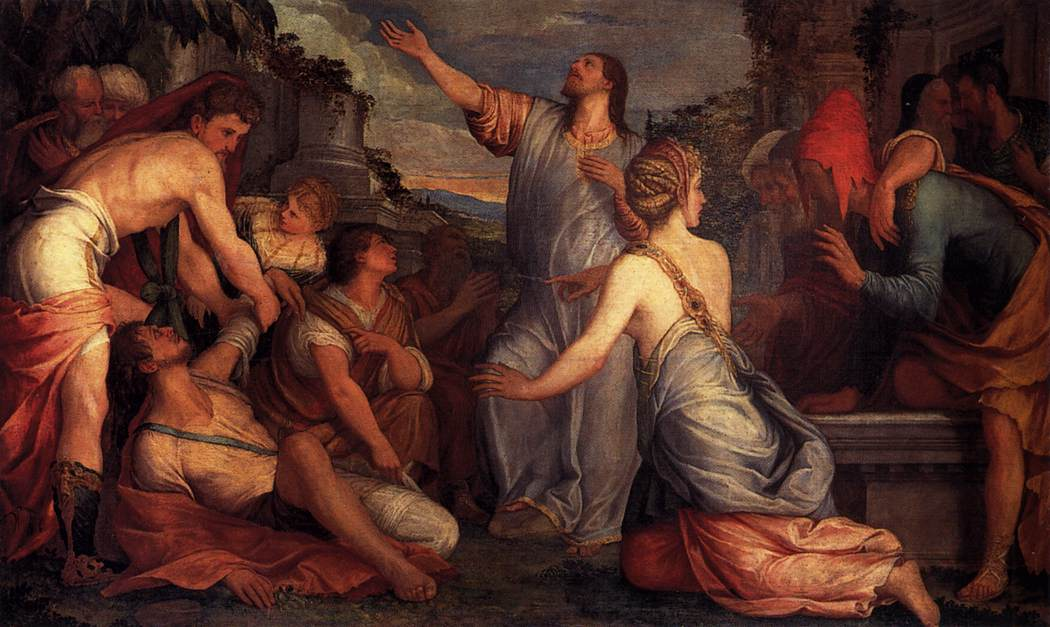
Raising of Lazarus

=== Relationship with nature ===
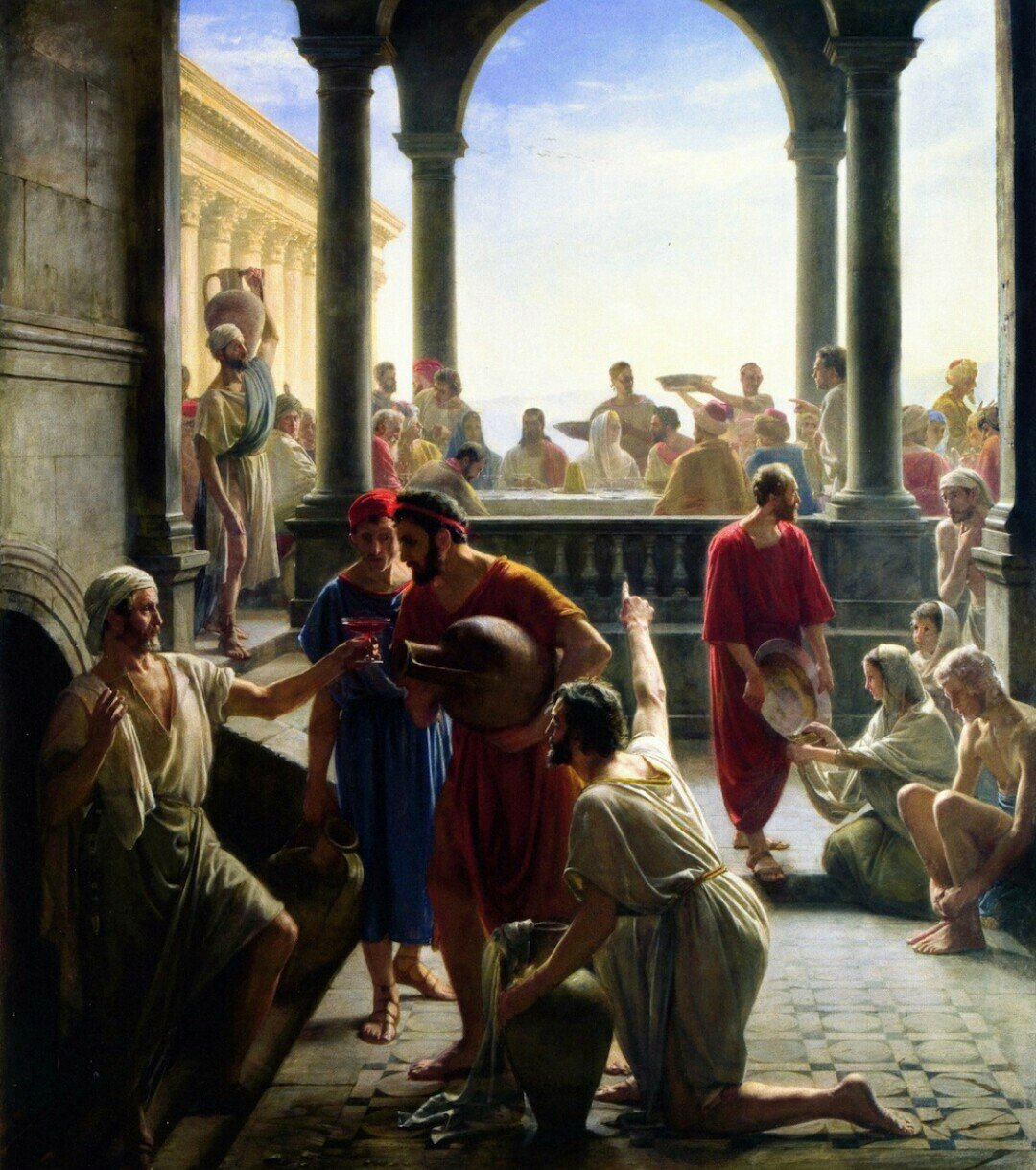
Marriage at Cana

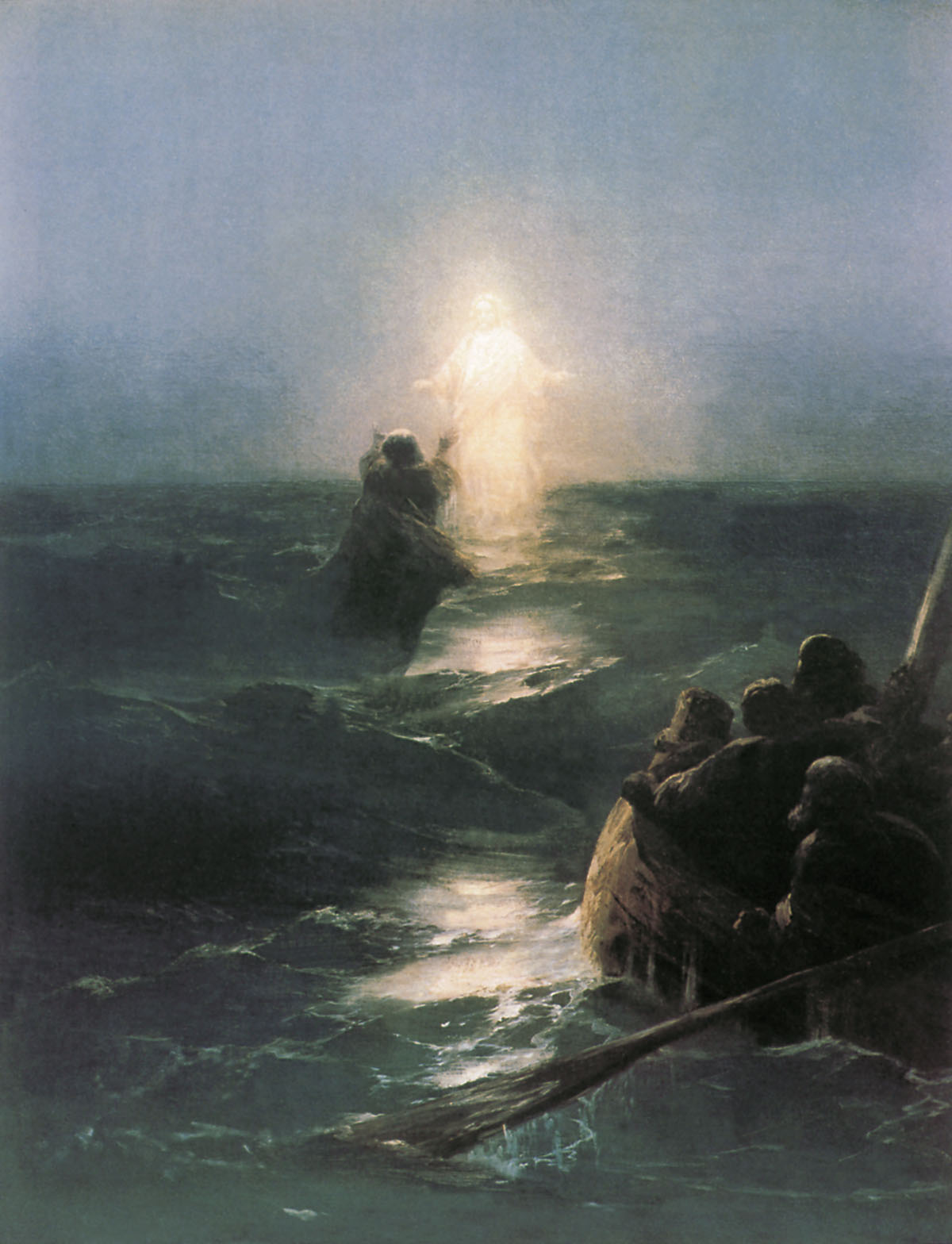
Walking on water

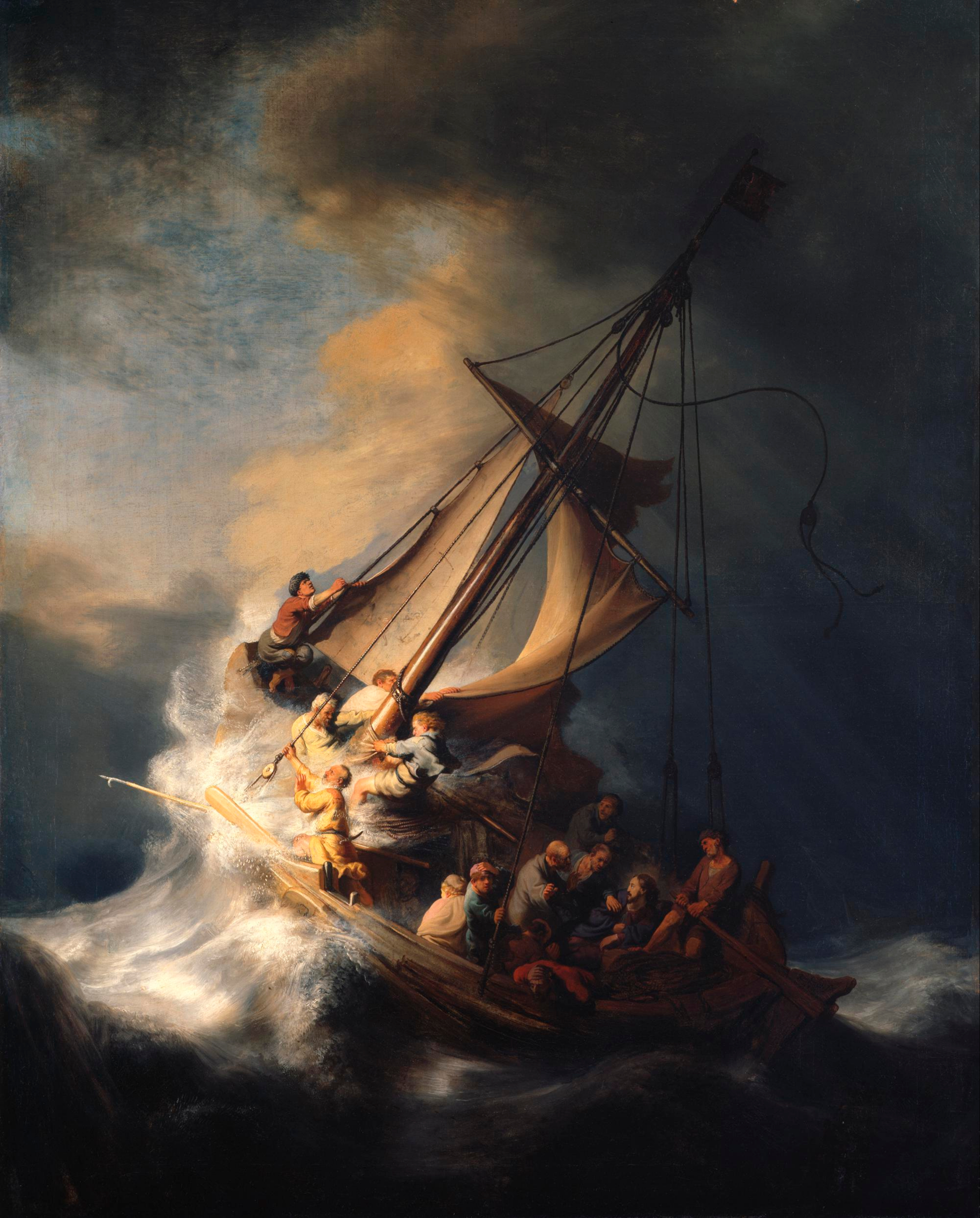
Calming the storm

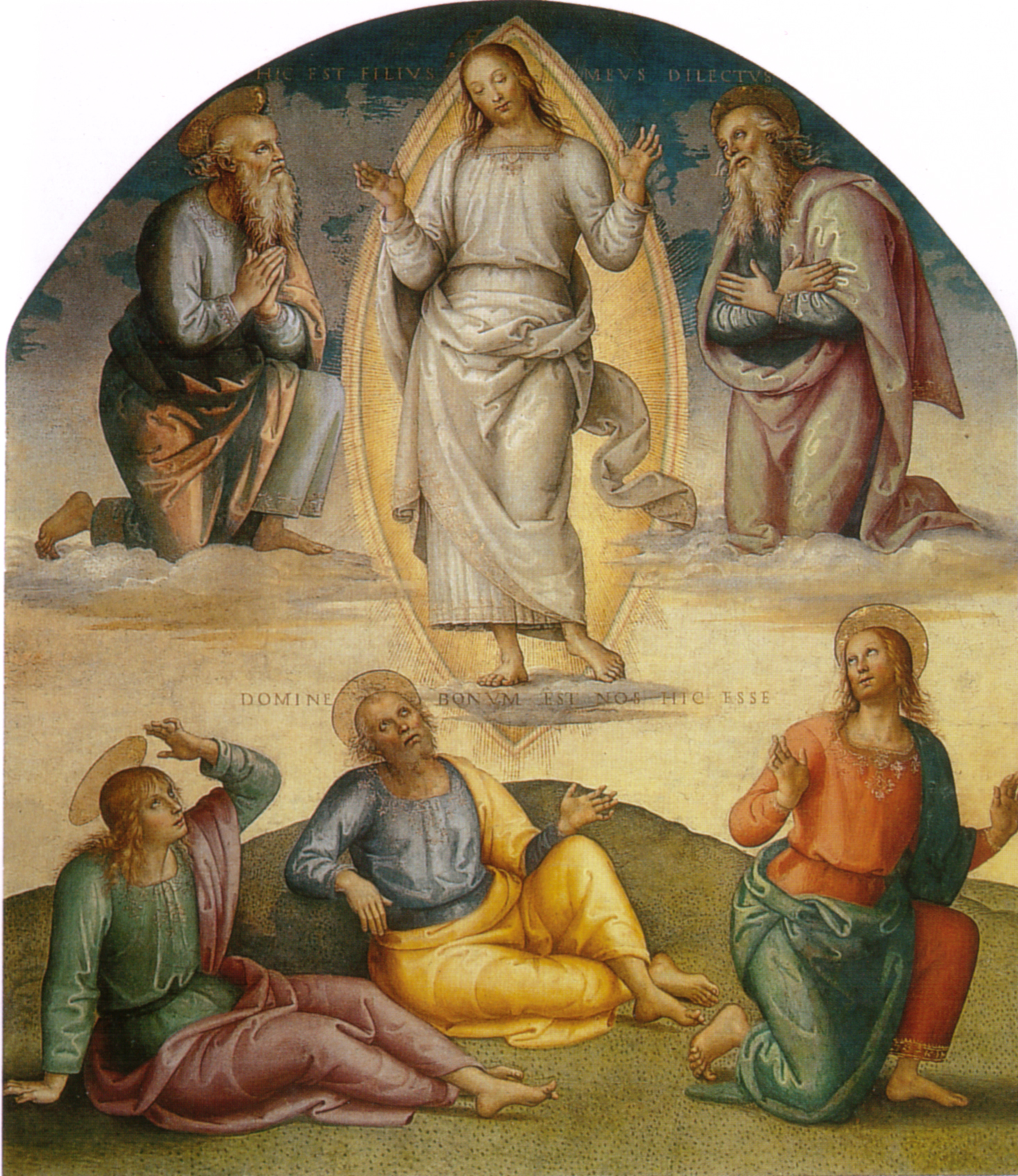
Transfiguration

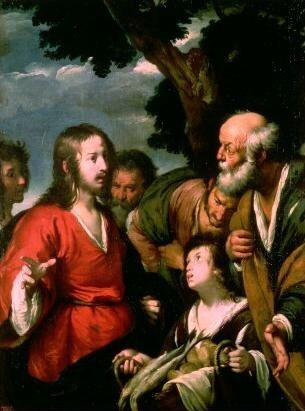
Feeding the multitude

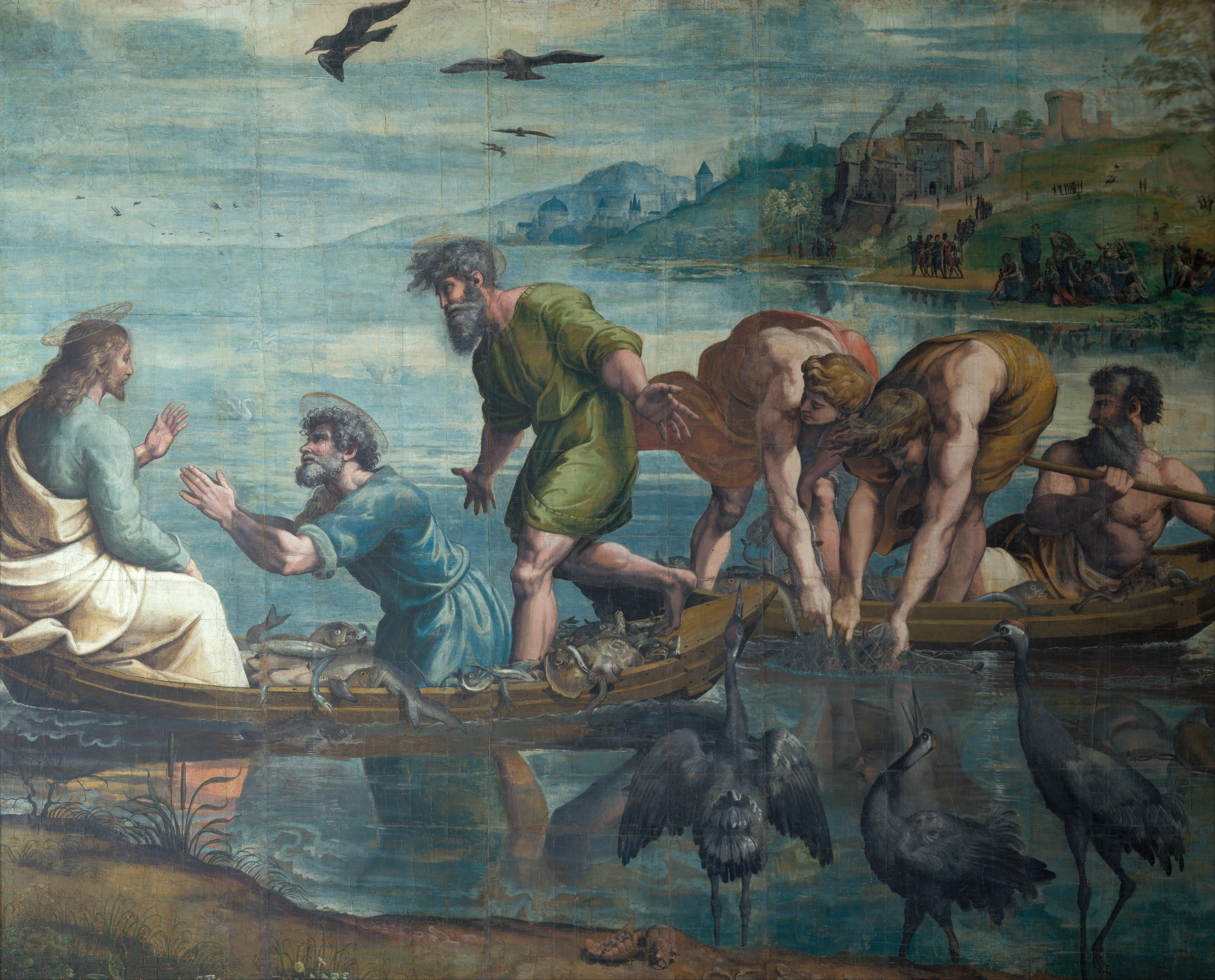
Draught of fishes

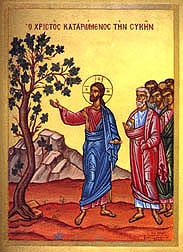
Cursing the fig tree

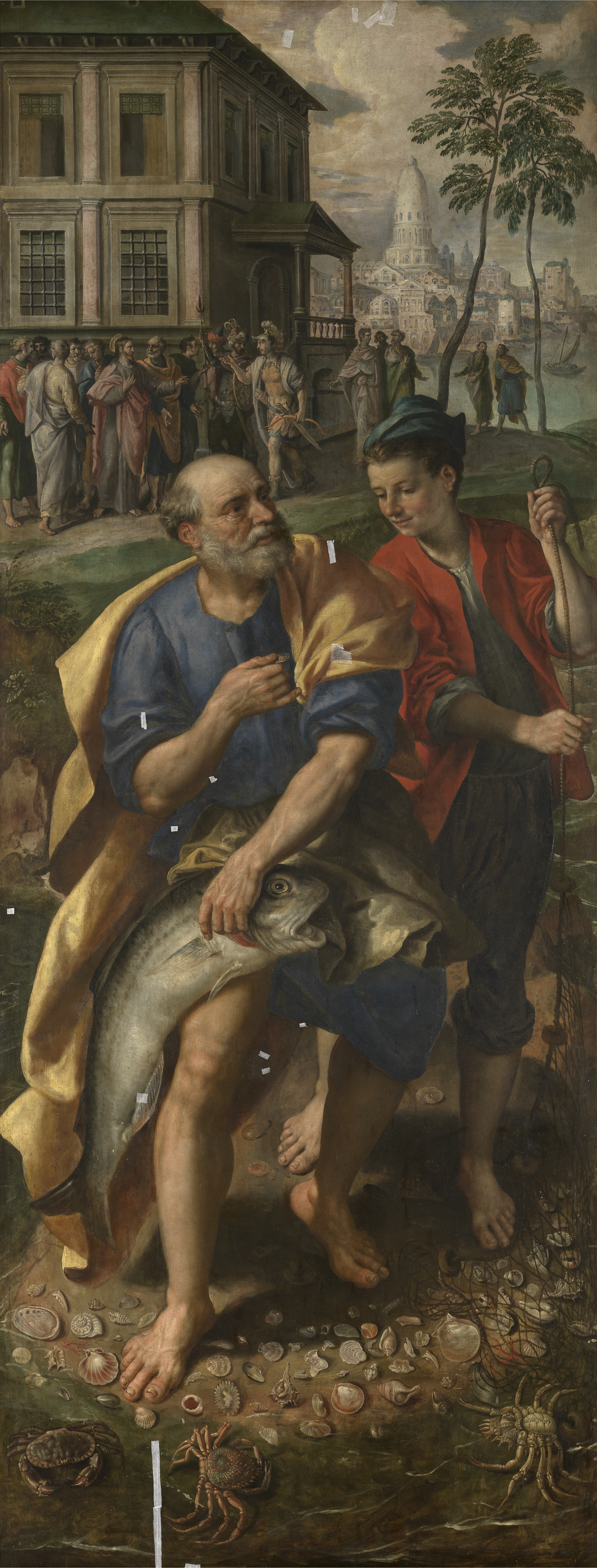
Coin in the fish's mouth

== See also ==
- Chronology of Jesus
- Life of Jesus in the New Testament
- Ministry of Jesus
- Miracles of Gautama Buddha
- Miracles of Muhammad
- Parables of Jesus
- International Standard Bible Encyclopedia

== Bibliography ==
- Bersee, Ton (2021). On the Meaning of 'Miracle' in Christianity. An Evaluation of the Current Miracle Debate and a Proposal of a Balanced Hermeneutical Approach. Peeters Publishers, Leuven. ISBN 978-9042943957
- Funk, Robert W. and the Jesus Seminar (1998). The Acts of Jesus: The Search for the Authentic Deeds of Jesus. Polebridge Press, San Francisco. ISBN 0060629789
- Kilgallen, John J. (1989). A Brief Commentary on the Gospel of Mark, Paulist Press, ISBN 0809130599
- List of Jesus' Miracles and Biblical References
- Lockyer, Herbert (1988). All the Miracles of the Bible ISBN 0310281016
- Miller, Robert J. Editor (1994). The Complete Gospels, Polebridge Press, ISBN 0060655879
- Murcia, Thierry, Jésus, les miracles en question, Paris, 1999 – Jésus, les miracles élucidés par la médecine, Paris, 2003
- Omaar, Rageh (2003). The Miracles of Jesus BBC documentary
- Twelftree, Graham H. (1999). Jesus the Miracle Worker: A Historical and Theological Study. IVP Academic. ISBN 978-0830815968.
- Van der Loos, H. (1965). The Miracles of Jesus, E.J. Brill Press, Netherlands
