= Jesus exorcising a mute =

Miracle carried out by Jesus according to the Bible

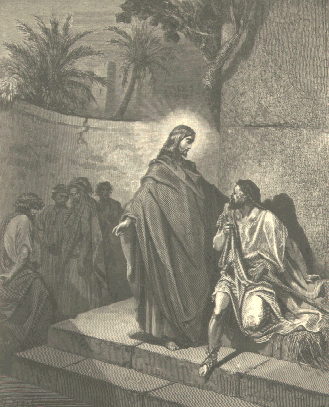
Christ exorcising a mute by Gustav Doré, 1865

Jesus exorcising a mute is the last of a series of miracles of Jesus recorded in chapter 9 of the Gospel of Matthew. It appears in Matthew 9:32–34, immediately following the account of Christ healing two blind men (Matthew 9:27–31).

According to the Gospel of Matthew, just as the two blind men were healed by Jesus were going out, a man who was demon-possessed and could not talk was brought to Jesus. And when the demon was driven out, the man who had been mute spoke. The crowd was amazed and said, "Nothing like this has ever been seen in Israel".

But the Pharisees said, "It is by the prince of demons that he drives out demons". The charge reappears, with the addition of the name of "Beelzebub" as the ruler of the devils, in Matthew 12:24.

The episode closely parallels the fuller Beelzebul controversy of Matthew 12:22–24, which Matthew develops at greater length. Here the miracle itself is reported only briefly, in a passive construction that leaves Jesus's agency to be inferred, because the emphasis falls on the contrasting reactions of the crowds and the Pharisees that conclude the cycle of miracle stories in chapters 8 and 9. The parallel in Luke 11:14 indicates that the underlying tradition was already very brief.

== Commentary ==
This episode in the life of Christ is seen as a fulfillment of the prophecy of Isaiah (35:5): "Then shall the eyes of the blind be opened, and the ears of the deaf shall be unstopped, and the tongue of the dumb shall sing."

Cornelius a Lapide notes that it appears that the demon made the man deaf and dumb, who was not naturally thus. He also comments that these passages demonstrate different ranking among demons, as also among angels (some lower, some higher). So the higher orders who fell, "who were of a grander nature; for that which was theirs naturally remained in the devils after their fall." He points out that even among rebel soldiers there are captains and generals. Because without these an army cannot be governed. As Lucifer is the prince of all the devils, so is St. Michael of all the angels (see Revelation 12). The different dispositions of the Pharisees compared to the multitude is worth note. The crowd, with simple candor, "magnified the miracles of Christ as done by a Divine Person, even the Messiah." However the Pharisees envied Christ, and were resentful of Him, saying he used a magic art. The crowd's exclamation adapts wording Matthew had passed over from his Markan source at Mark 2:12, broadening it from the immediate witnesses of a single healing to encompass the whole history of Israel and so underscoring the newness of what comes with Jesus, the headline theme of this final set of three miracle stories.

The Greek word rendered "mute" (κωφός) literally means "blunt" or "dull" and was applied to people whose capacity to communicate was severely impaired, whether by deafness, muteness, or both; the same term recurs in Matthew 11:5.

Unlike its fuller repetition in Matthew 12:24, where Jesus answers it with a reductio ad absurdum (that Satan would not cast out Satan), the accusation here is introduced without rebuttal, marking a deepening of the hostility first signalled at Matthew 9:11.

Verse 34 is absent from several witnesses, including Codex Bezae and part of the Old Latin and Old Syriac traditions, where it was probably omitted as anticlimactic; in the text it prepares for Matthew 10:25 and links this episode with the fuller controversy of Matthew 12:16–24.

== See also ==
- Life of Jesus in the New Testament
- Ministry of Jesus
- Miracles of Jesus
- Parables of Jesus
