= Cleansing ten lepers =

Miracle carried out by Jesus according to the Bible

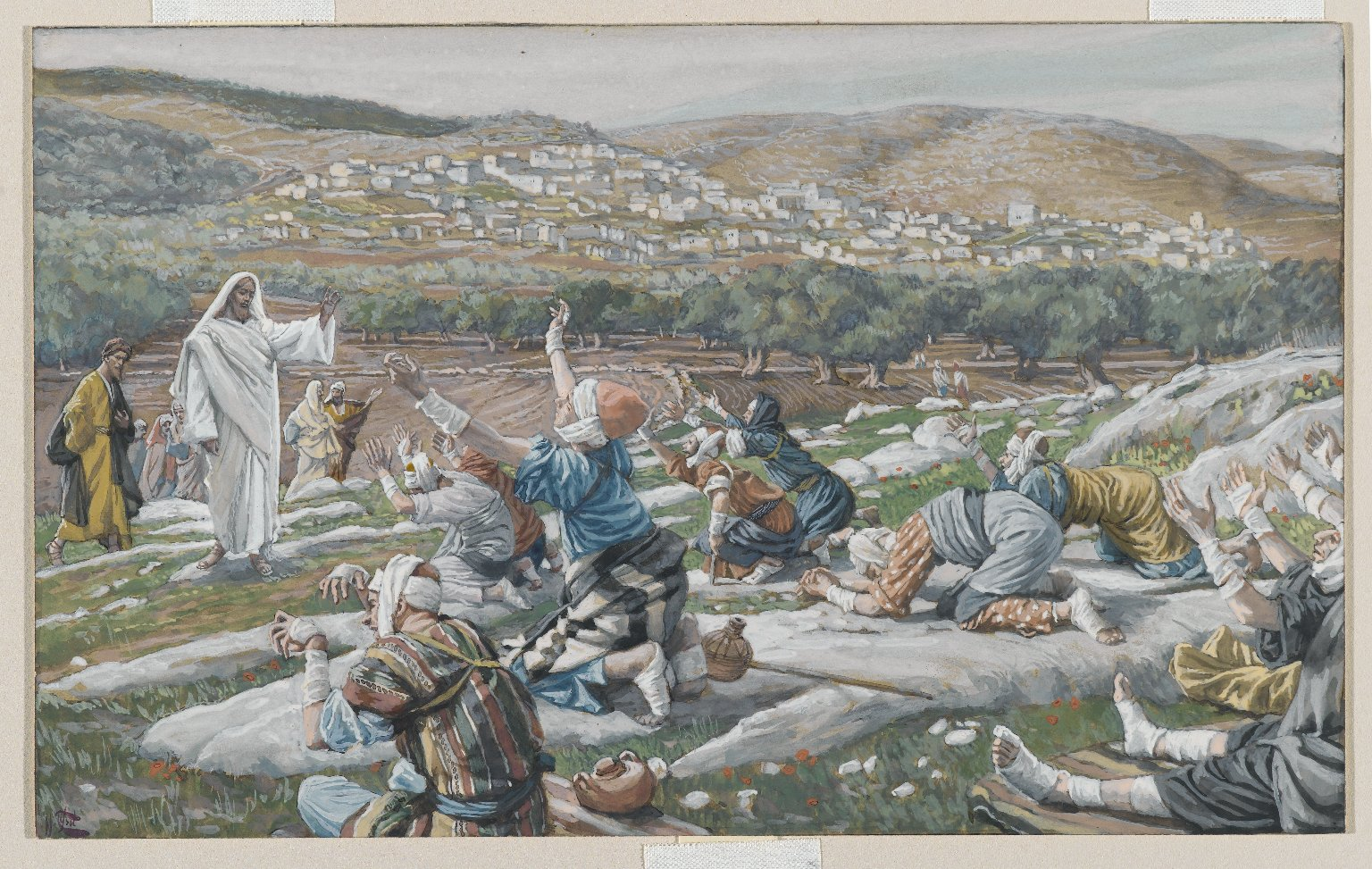
James Tissot - The Healing of Ten Lepers (Guérison de dix lépreux) - Brooklyn Museum

Jesus' cleansing of ten lepers is one of the miracles of Jesus reported in the Gospels (Gospel of Luke 17:11–19).

== Narrative ==
Ten lepers, seeing Jesus, "raised their voices and said, “Jesus, Master, have mercy on us!” Jesus healed all ten, telling them to, "Go, show yourselves to the priests." All left, but only one eventually returned, prompting Jesus to say: “Were not ten cleansed? Where are the other nine? Has no one returned to praise God except this foreigner?”

== Analysis ==
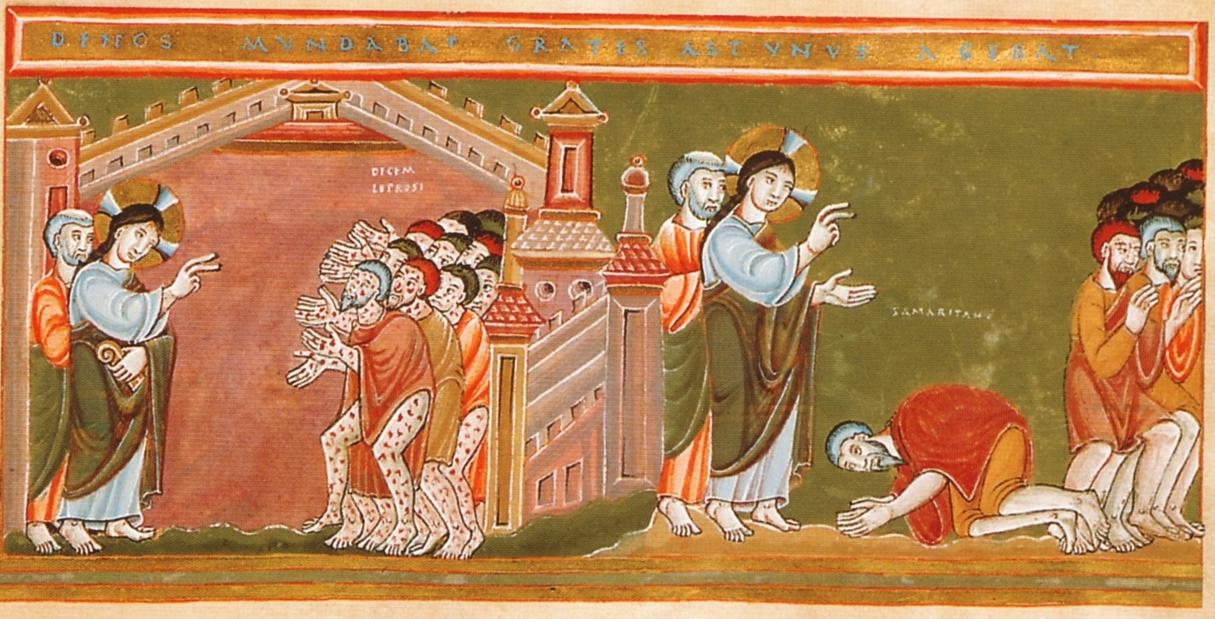
Cleansing of the ten lepers (c. 1035–1040)

According to Berard Marthaler and Herbert Lockyer, this miracle emphasizes the importance of faith, for Jesus did not say: "My power has saved you" but attributed the healing to the faith of the beneficiaries.

Roger Baxter in his meditations, notes that the lepers' prayer had three important properties, that are requisite to every good prayer:

1. They were humble, because "they stood afar off."
2. They prayed in harmony and zealously, "they lifted up their voice." This accords with Psalm 21: "when I cried to Him, He heard me."
3. They did not pray that he would restore them to health, but that "He would have mercy on them." Thus they left their situation to the will of God.

Cornelius a Lapide notes that the other nine lepers rejoiced at their cure, but were self-centered, and so went to the priests purely for the end that they might be "declared to be clean, and restored to the society of men," and thus they thought little of glorifying Jesus."

== See also ==
- Related Bible part: Luke 17
- Christ cleansing a leper
- Life of Jesus in the New Testament
- Ministry of Jesus
- Miracles of Jesus
- Parables of Jesus
