= Healing the deaf mute of Decapolis =

Miracle carried out by Jesus according to the Bible

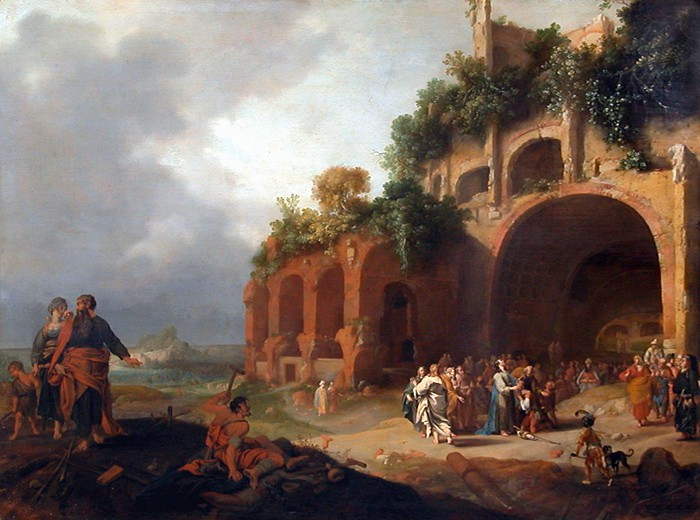
Christ healing the deaf mute of Decapolis, by Bartholomeus Breenbergh, 1635

Healing the deaf mute of Decapolis is one of the miracles of Jesus recorded in chapter 7 of the Gospel of Mark. Its narration offers many parallels with the healing of the blind man of Bethsaida in Mark 8:22-26. Along with the mention of the naked fugitive in chapter 14, it is one of the few events recorded only in the Gospel of Mark and none of the other canonical gospels.

== Biblical accounts ==
According to the Gospel of Mark, when Jesus entered the region of the Decapolis after passing through Sidon and down the Sea of Galilee, some people brought to him a man who was deaf and could hardly talk, and they begged Jesus to place his hand on him.

The itinerary in Mark 7:31, from Tyre through Sidon to the Sea of Galilee and the Decapolis, is circuitous; Craig Blomberg notes that some critics have cited it as evidence of "confused topography," but argues the route is defensible and reflects Jesus moving through largely Gentile territory. Ben Witherington III likewise observes that Jesus passes from one largely non-Jewish region (Tyre and Sidon) to another, the Decapolis, which he had visited before.

Witherington notes that the Greek word for the man's condition, μογιλάλος (mogilalos, a hapax legomenon in the New Testament), denotes not total inability to speak but a speech impediment such as a stutter or other severe difficulty. He infers that the man had probably become deaf later in life, since one deaf from birth would not have learned to speak; this is the first healing of a deaf person in Mark, and the request that Jesus "lay his hands on him" may indicate the man was a Jew.

This account follows the healing of the daughter of a Syro-Phoenician woman who speaks with Jesus about whether his mission extends to the gentiles (Mark 7:24-30). The deaf-mute man lives in the gentile Decapolis region, although the text does not specify that he is a gentile. The Gospel of Mark states:

After he took him aside, away from the crowd, Jesus put his fingers into the man's ears. Then he spit and touched the man's tongue. He looked up to heaven and with a deep sigh said to him, "Ephphatha!" (which means "Be opened!"). At this, the man's ears were opened, his tongue was loosened and he began to speak plainly. Jesus commanded them not to tell anyone. But the more he did so, the more they kept talking about it. People were overwhelmed with amazement. "He has done everything well," they said. "He even makes the deaf hear and the mute speak."

— Mark 7:33-37, New International Version

Witherington observes that spittle was widely thought to have healing properties in both the Jewish and Greco-Roman world, and that Jesus takes the man aside from the crowd before acting; the deep sigh as Jesus looks to heaven (Mark 7:34) has been read variously as the strain of healing, grief over the ravages of disease, or heartfelt prayer. Tim Keller suggests the gestures function as a kind of sign language by which Jesus enters the deaf man's world, and that taking him aside spares him being made a public spectacle.

Ephphatha is Aramaic (or possibly Hebrew) and represents Jesus's own intelligible native speech rather than the unintelligible formulas or incantations used by some ancient wonder-workers. J. P. Moreland treats the retention of such Aramaic words in a Greek text, alongside talitha koum (Mark 5:41) and Golgotha (Mark 15:22), as evidence for the historical reliability of the tradition, since a later inventor would have had little reason to preserve untranslated terms.

== Analysis ==
New Testament commentator Lamar Williamson writes that this is the last unit in a series of miracles concerned with the identity of Jesus, as subsequently confirmed by Saint Peter's christological affirmation in Mark 8:29, where Peter exclaimed: "You are the Messiah". William Lane suggests that the pericope closes a cycle of material presenting Jesus as the fulfiller of Old Testament promise (here Isaiah 35:5–6), a theological rather than strictly chronological arrangement; Joel Marcus notes the close verbal parallels between this healing and the healing of the blind man at Bethsaida (Mark 8:22–26), both echoing the same Isaianic promise that the deaf and blind would be healed.

The crowd's disregard of the command to silence, Witherington notes, increases "in proportion to Jesus' insistence on it," which he takes as evidence against reading a "messianic secret" motif into the episode, since the publicity moves in the opposite direction.

Roger Baxter in his meditations, reflects on the question, What is spiritual dumbness?, writing, "He is spiritually dumb, who does not correct his brother, when by doing so, he can prevent him from sinning. He also is spiritually dumb, who does not preach the Word of God, when it is his duty, or make open profession of his faith, when the honor of God, his own or neighbor's good requires it. Lastly, he labors under this spiritual complaint, whose tongue is not employed in the praises of God, in the exercises of devotion and pious conversations. "Wo is me," says the prophet, "because I held my peace." (Isa 6:6.) And, "you that are mindful of the Lord hold not your peace." (Isa 62:6.)

Witherington argues that the crowd's acclamation, "He has done all things well" (Mark 7:37), alludes to Isaiah 35:5–6, where making the deaf hear is an act reserved to God in the coming age, and probably also echoes Genesis 1:31 and its verdict on the goodness of creation.

== See also ==
- Life of Jesus
- Ministry of Jesus
- New Testament places associated with Jesus
- Parables of Jesus
- Muteness
