= Healing a man with dropsy =

Miracle carried out by Jesus according to the Bible

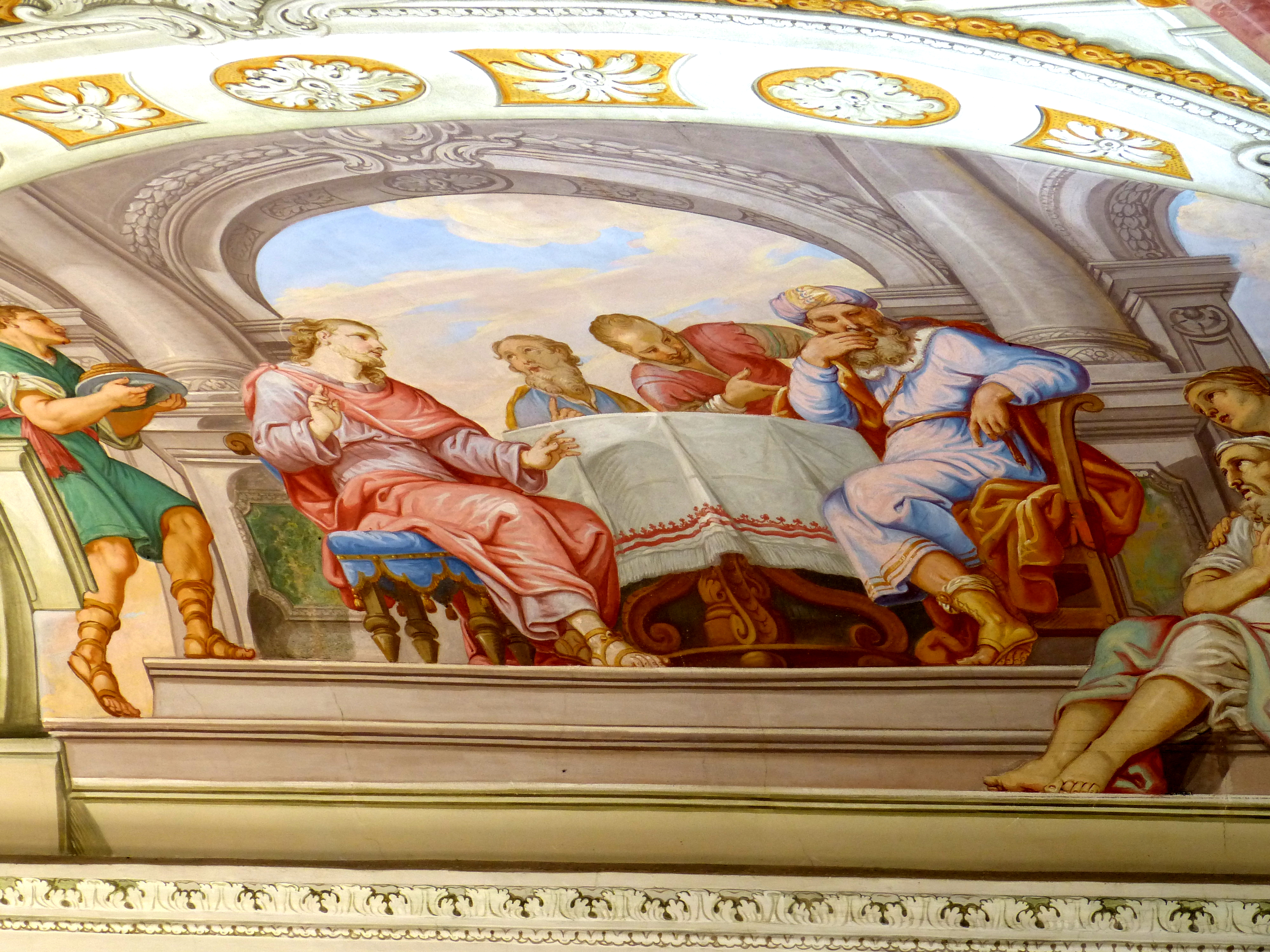
Fresco by Balthasar Augustin Albrecht showing Jesus healing a man with dropsy., Herrenchiemsee Abbey, 1715

Healing a man with dropsy is one of the miracles of Jesus in the Gospels (Luke 14:1-6).

According to the Gospel, one Sabbath, Jesus went to eat in the house of a prominent Pharisee, and he was being carefully watched. There in front of him was a man suffering from dropsy, i.e. abnormal swelling of his body.

Jesus asked the Pharisees and experts in the law:

"Is it lawful to heal on the Sabbath or not?"

But they remained silent. So taking hold of the man, he healed him and sent him on his way.

Then he asked them:

"If one of you has a child or an ox that falls into a well on the Sabbath day, will you not immediately pull it out?"

And they had nothing to say.

== Commentary ==
Cornelius a Lapide comments on the mystical significance of the animals, writing, "that the ox and the donkey represent the wise and the foolish," which are "the Jew oppressed by the burden of the Law" (the ox) and "the Gentile not subject to reason." (the donkey/child) In both cases the Lord rescues them from the pit of concupiscence.

Commenting on the offended, speechless Pharisee, Theophylact of Ohrid writes, “Care nought, for the offence given to the Pharisees.” For when a great good is the result, we should not care if the foolish are offended.

== See also ==
- Life of Jesus in the New Testament
- Ministry of Jesus
- Miracles of Jesus
- Parables of Jesus
- Pikuach nefesh
