= Exorcising the blind and mute man =

Miracle performed by Jesus

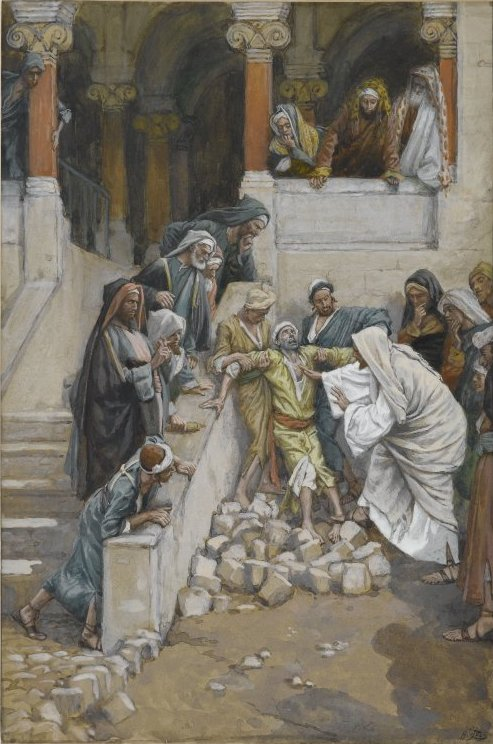
Exorcising the blind and mute man by James Tissot, late 19th century

Exorcising the blind and mute man is one of the miracles of Jesus in the Gospels. It appears in Matthew 12:22-32, Luke 11:14-23 and Mark 3:20-30.

According to the Gospels, Jesus healed a demon-possessed man who was blind and mute, so that he could both talk and see. People were astonished and said, "Could this be the Son of David?"

But when the Pharisees heard this, they said, "It is only by Beelzebul, the prince of demons, that this fellow drives out demons."

Jesus said to them:

"Every kingdom divided against itself will be ruined, and every city or household divided against itself will not stand. If Satan drives out Satan, he is divided against himself. How then can his kingdom stand? And if I drive out demons by Beelzebul, by whom do your people drive them out? So then, they will be your judges. But if it is by the finger of God that I drive out demons, then the kingdom of God has come upon you. Or again, how can anyone enter a strong man's house and carry off his possessions without first tying up the strong man? Then his house can be plundered. Whoever is not with me is against me, and whoever does not gather with me scatters. And so I tell you, people will be forgiven every sin and blasphemy. But blasphemy against the Spirit will not be forgiven. Anyone who speaks a word against the Son of Man will be forgiven, but anyone who speaks against the Holy Spirit will not be forgiven, either in this age or in the age to come." Matthew 12:25-32

The name Beelzebul is widely connected to 2 Kings 1:2, where Baal-zebub ("lord of the flies") is the god of the Philistine city of Ekron whom King Ahaziah consults. Iain Provan notes that several Gospel manuscripts read "Beelzebub" (after the Kings figure) where better manuscripts read "Beelzebul," and suggests that the Old Testament form "Baal-zebub" may itself be a deliberate, scornful corruption of "Baal-zebul" ("Baal the exalted"), comparable to the substitution of bōšeṯ ("shame") for Baal elsewhere in the Hebrew Bible.

== Messianic title ==
John Nolland notes that "Son of David" had been introduced as a messianic title earlier in Matthew (at Matthew 9:27); here the crowds raise the christological possibility only as a question, echoing the questioning manner of the inquiry sent by John the Baptist in Matthew 11:2–3.

Arnold Fruchtenbaum argues that since Jewish exorcists would ask for the demon's name as part of their procedure, the tradition had developed that only the Messiah would be able to exorcise a mute spirit. Other scholars are cautious about reading "Son of David" as implying an expected healing or exorcising messiah. Nolland holds that, despite strands of Jewish tradition linking Solomon (as a son of David) with exorcism, "there is no real basis for linking 'Son of David' as a messianic title with an expectation of a healing messiah," citing Ulrich Luz. Nolland also notes that Jesus's exorcisms were perceived as different in kind from contemporary practice: where other exorcists "used elaborate means of various kinds, in the case of Jesus a simple directive was enough."

== Gospel parallels ==
Nolland notes a close parallel between Matthew 12:22–30 and Luke 11:14–23, with a partial parallel in Mark 3:22–27. He observes that Matthew's own main contribution to the episode is to give words to the astonished crowds in Matthew 12:23, and that the brief account of the exorcism itself was probably "secondarily formed as an introduction" to the controversy that follows. Where Matthew has Jesus cast out demons "by the Spirit of God" (Matthew 12:28), Luke reads "by the finger of God" (Luke 11:20); Nolland regards Luke as probably responsible for the difference. Mark mentions the ensuing controversy starting with the charge of casting out demons but does not describe the event itself. Luke mentions the demoniac's muteness, but not his blindness.

In Mark, Witherington notes, the Beelzebul controversy (Mark 3:22–30) is one of the Gospel's "sandwich" intercalations: it is framed by the report that Jesus's family set out to restrain him, saying "He is out of his mind" (Mark 3:20–21, Mark 3:31–35). The two charges, that Jesus is deluded (from his family) and that he is demon-possessed (from the scribes who "came down from Jerusalem"), are placed side by side so as to interpret each other.

== Jesus' response ==
Jesus likens his exorcisms to plundering the house of a "strong man" who must first be tied up (Matthew 12:29; Mark 3:27). Nolland identifies the strong man with Satan, "tied up by a stronger so that his goods may be plundered." Bock similarly describes Jesus as the "someone stronger" who overruns the strong man Beelzebul. Ben Witherington III presents Jesus in Mark as "the Stronger One" (cf. Mark 1:8) who binds Satan and plunders his goods, showing that Jesus is "the adversary, not the ally, of Satan"; Witherington connects the binding to Jesus's earlier encounter with the devil in the wilderness.

Darrell Bock reads this saying as presenting Jesus as the victor in a cosmic struggle: if Jesus casts out demons by the finger of God, then "the kingdom of God has come in its initial form as evidence that Satan is and can be overrun." In Luke's account the request for "a sign from heaven" (Luke 11:16) follows immediately on the exorcism. Michael Licona suggests that Jesus's statement in Luke 11:20, that he casts out demons "by the finger of God," may indicate that the exorcism they had just witnessed was itself the act of God, the very "sign from heaven" being demanded.

Craig Blomberg regards Matthew 12:28 (and its parallel Luke 11:20) as "one of the clearest passages in the Gospels to support 'realized eschatology'", the arrival of God's kingdom within Jesus's ministry.

=== Blasphemy against the Holy Spirit ===
Nolland connects this saying to Matthew 12:28: because Jesus's exorcisms exhibit "the manifest presence of God by his Spirit," to attribute that work to Beelzebul is "an extreme form of blasphemy." On his reading the sin is unforgivable because it excludes a person from participating in what God is doing in Jesus, though it "remains unforgivable only as long as it is sustained" and may still be repented of. The contrasting forgivability of speaking against the Son of Man (Matthew 12:32), Nolland adds, reflects an awareness that "not every aspect of Jesus' ministry was as transparently the place of immediate action of the Spirit of God as were his exorcisms." On the Markan form (Mark 3:28–30),

Witherington describes the sin as "no accidental sin but a wilful perversity which calls the work of God's Spirit the work of the devil," and notes it concerns "the Spirit who empowered Jesus to act while on earth."

Craig Blomberg, noting the "needless consternation" the saying has caused, defines it in context as "the persistent equation of Christ's power with the demonic by those who refuse to believe him," and observes that anxiety about having committed it is itself evidence that one has not.

== See also ==
- Exorcism
- Finger of God (Commandments)
- Life of Jesus in the New Testament
- Ministry of Jesus
- Miracles of Jesus
- Parables of Jesus
