= Jesus exorcising at sunset =

Miracle carried out by Jesus according to the Bible

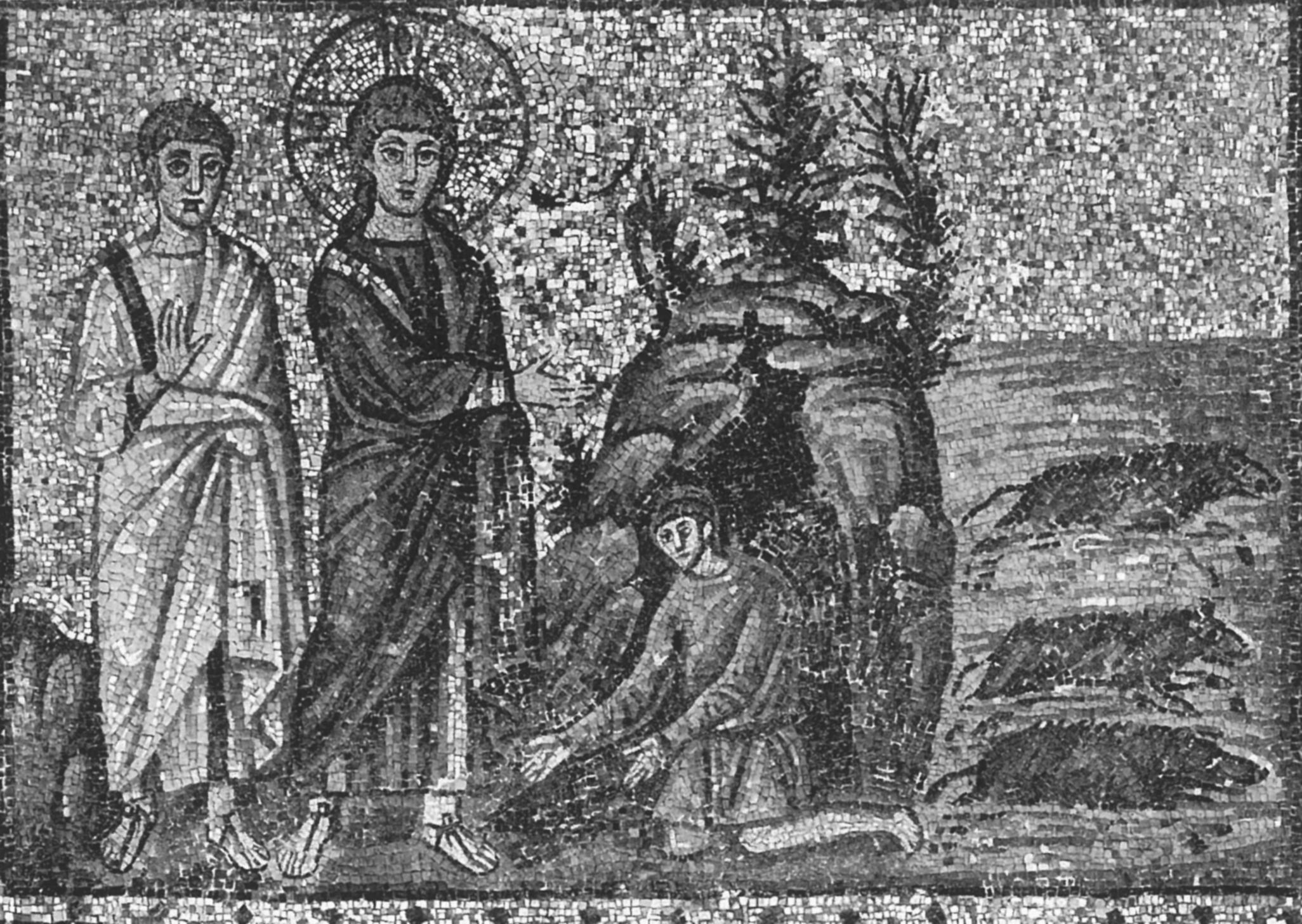
Fifth century mosaic of Christ exorcising demons, Basilica of Sant'Apollinare Nuovo, Ravenna, Italy

The synoptic gospels portray Jesus exorcising at sunset just after he had healed the mother of Peter's wife, in Matthew 8:16–17, Mark 1:32–34 and Luke 4:40–41.

According to the Gospels, after Jesus had healed the mother of Peter's wife, when evening came, many who were demon-possessed were brought to him, and he drove out the spirits with a word and healed all the sick. According to the Gospel of Matthew, this was to fulfill what was spoken through the prophet Isaiah:

"He took up our infirmities
and bore our diseases.

According to the Gospel of Luke, as the demons came out of many people, they shouted, "You are the Son of God!" But Jesus rebuked them and would not allow them to speak, because they knew he was the Christ.

The accounts in the Gospels of Mark and Luke report events taking place on the Sabbath. Sundown signified the end of the Jewish Sabbath. Many people came out or were brought out to Jesus to be healed of their infirmities and delivered from evil spirits. As described in the biblical account of the event, every single person that came out was healed or delivered. Jesus had compassion on the mass of people in his presence because he identified with the pain and suffering they were going through even though he was not subject to the afflictions himself. The supernatural power flowing out of Jesus provided evidence of him being the foretold Messiah of Israel as prophesied by the Isaiah the prophet.

Matthew's gospel makes no reference in this narrative its timing on the evening of Sabbath day: the first mention of the Sabbath day and controversies around Jesus acting on the Sabbath comes in Matthew 12. The Pulpit Commentary suggests that the events did take place on the evening of the Sabbath, the "original connexion [being] preserved, as it seems, in Mark and Luke" and lost in Matthew. When the sabbath was over (Leviticus 23:32), people were free to carry out their sick. Alternatively, "should the day not have been a sabbath, we may presume that the evening was chosen as cooler for the sick to be moved, and as more convenient to those who carried them, the day's work being done".

== See also ==
- Life of Jesus in the New Testament
