= Commentaries on the Bible =

Commentaries on the Bible may refer to:

- List of Biblical commentaries
  - Commentary on Job
  - Commentary on Romans
  - Commentary on Revelation
- Jewish commentaries on the Bible

== See also ==
- Bible commentary
