= On the First Principles =

Theological treatise by Origen

On the First Principles or Peri Archon (Greek: Περὶ Ἀρχῶν; Latin: De Principiis) is a theological treatise by the Christian writer Origen. It was the first systematic exposition of Christian theology. It is thought to have been written around 220–230 AD. The full text has not been completely preserved.

When Origen was around forty-five years of age, he interrupted his burgeoning program of scriptural exegesis to write Peri Archon. In this work he provided a unified discussion of Christian teachings so that his readers could probe more deeply into the church's rule of faith and discriminate among conflicting scriptural interpretations that were swirling through Alexandria in the late 220s. After completing this treatise, Origen resumed his biblical scholarship, likely viewing Peri Archon as a detour, perhaps even a necessary one, but nevertheless still a detour from his larger project of scriptural interpretation.

Fragments from Books 3.1 and 4.1-3 of Origen's Greek original are preserved in Origen's Philocalia. A few smaller quotations of the original Greek are apparently preserved in Justinian's Letter to Mennas. The vast majority of the text has only survived in a Latin translation produced by Tyrannius Rufinus in 397. Rufinus was convinced that Origen's original treatise had been interpolated by heretics and that these interpolations were the source of the seemingly heterodox teachings found in it. He thus modified some aspects of the text in his translation. Jerome disagreed with Rufinus and resolved to produce his own Latin translation of On the First Principles. Jerome's translation, however, has been lost in its entirety. There is debate still to this day regarding the proper text and teaching of the work.

On the First Principles begins with an essay explaining the nature of theology. Book One describes the heavenly world, and includes descriptions of the oneness of God, the relationship between the three persons of the Trinity, the nature of the divine spirit, reason, and angels. It affirms a specific view of apokatastasis which was later condemned and considered heretical.

Book Two describes the world of man, including the incarnation of the Logos, the soul, free will, and eschatology. Book Three deals with cosmology, sin, and redemption. Book Four deals with teleology and the interpretation of the Scriptures.

== Bibliography ==
- Heine, Ronald E. (2010), Origen: Scholarship in the Service of the Church, Oxford: OUP, p. 275, ISBN 978-0-19-920908-8
- McGuckin, John Anthony (2004), The Westminster Handbook to Origen, Louisville, Kentucky: Westminster John Knox Press, ISBN 0-664-22472-5
