= Pseudo-Origen =

Pseudo-Origine, Homilia VI in Matthaeum, Latin copy from 1179

Pseudo-Origen is the name conventionally given to anonymous authors whose works are misattributed to Origen and by extension to the works themselves.

These include:

- De recta in Deum fide, a Greek dialogue of the late 3rd or early 4th century
- Planctus Origenis, also called Lamentum or Paenitentia, a purported retraction of some of his views regarded as heretical, supposedly translated from Greek into Latin by Jerome of Stridon
- Commentarius in Iob, a Latin commentary on Job from Vandal Africa
- De Maria Magdalena, a Latin homily on John 20:11–18
- Vitae Mediatrix, 6th-century Latin treatise on the title Mediatrix
- Chronicle of Pseudo-Origen, a lost chronicle used as a source for the Collectio Hibernensis
- Six homilies on Luke and Matthew attributed to Origen in the homiliary compiled by Paul the Deacon for Charlemagne are usually regarded as misattributed, including:
  - Homilia VI in Matthaeum
  - Homilia VII in Matthaeum, elsewhere misattributed to Bede
- Maria stabat ad monumentum, a Latin sermon, possibly by Odo of Morimond, reportedly translated into German by Nikolaus Kempf
