= Commentary on Romans =

Commentary on Romans may refer to the following commentaries on Epistle to the Romans:

- Commentary on Romans (Origen), by Origen
- Commentary on Romans, by Ambrosiaster
- Commentary on Romans (Pelagius), by Pelagius
- Commentary on Romans (Luther), by Martin Luther
- Commentary on Romans (Calvin), by John Calvin
- Commentary on Romans (Barth), by Karl Barth
