= Ambrose of Alexandria =

Christian saint and theologian (died c.250)

Saint Ambrose

Confessor
- Born: 2nd century Alexandria, Egypt
- Died: 250
- Venerated in: Eastern Orthodox Church; Oriental Orthodox Churches; Catholic Church
- Feast: 17 March

Ambrose of Alexandria (before 212 – c. 250) was a friend of the Christian theologian Origen.

== Life ==
Ambrose was attracted by Origen's fame as a teacher, and visited the Catechetical School of Alexandria in 212. At first a gnostic Valentinian and Marcionist, Ambrose, through Origen's teaching, eventually rejected this theology and became Origen's constant companion, and was ordained deacon. He plied Origen with questions, and urged him to write his Commentaries (treating him as "ἐργοδιώκτης" in Commentary on John V,1) on the books of the Bible, and, as a wealthy nobleman and courtier, he provided his teacher with books for his studies and secretaries to lighten the labor of composition. Origen often speaks of Ambrose affectionately as a man of education with excellent literary and scholarly tastes. All of Origen's works written after 218 are dedicated to Ambrose, including his Contra Celsum, Commentary on St. John's Gospel, and On Prayer. Ambrose's letters to Origen (praised by Jerome) are lost, although part of one exists.

He suffered during the persecution under the Roman emperor Maximinus Thrax in 235, which led Origen to write his Exhortation to Martyrdom, addressed to Ambrose and a priest of Caesarea named Protoctetus. He was later released and died a confessor. The last mention of Ambrose in the historical record is in Origen's Contra Celsum, which the latter wrote at the solicitation of Ambrose.

== Veneration ==
Ambrose is venerated as a saint by some branches of Christianity. His feast day in the Catholic Church falls on 17 March.
