= Contra Celsum =

3rd-century Christian apologetics work by Origen of Alexandria

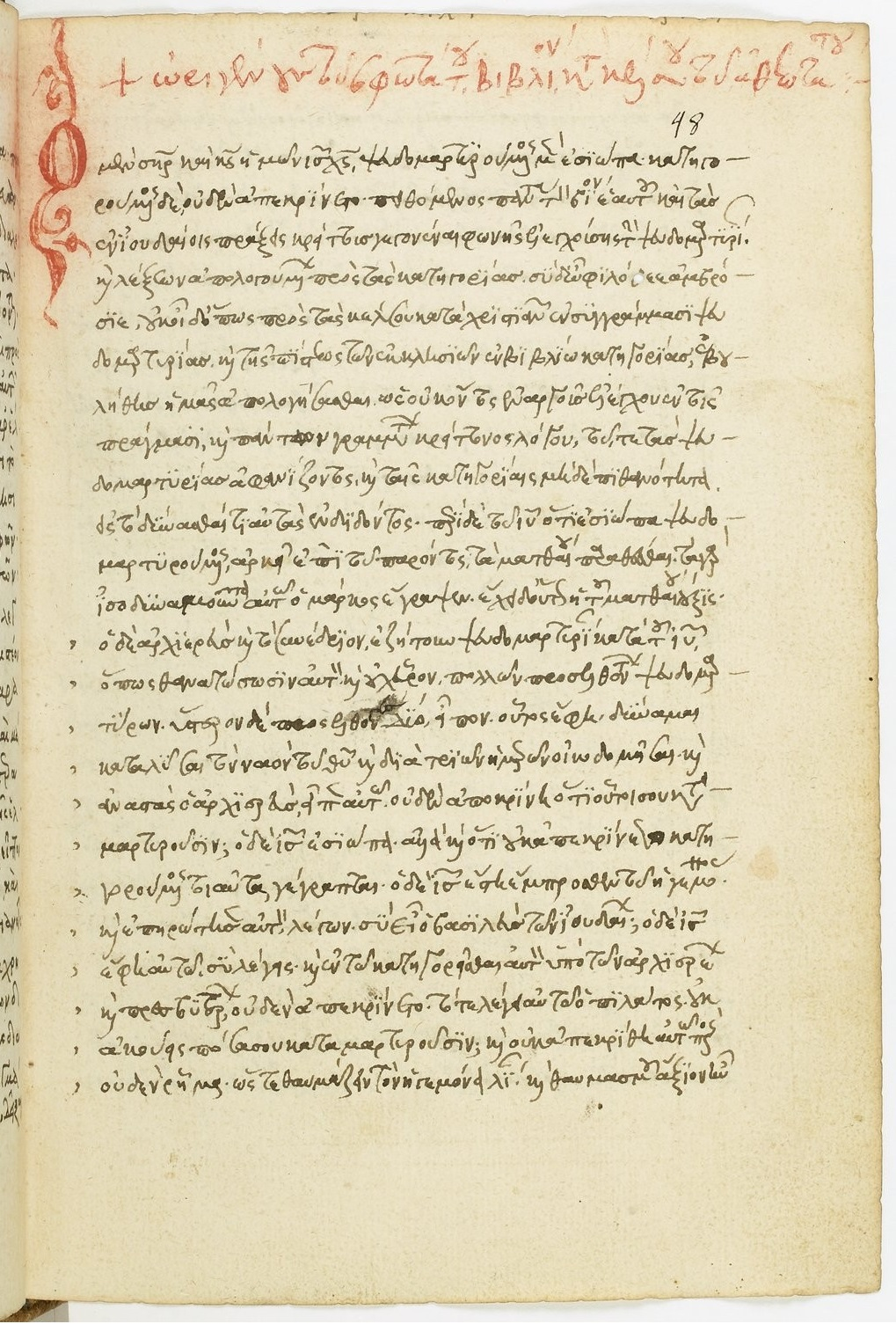
Greek text of Origen's apologetic treatise Contra Celsum, which is considered to be the most important work of early Christian apologetics

Against Celsus (Ancient Greek: Κατὰ Κέλσου, Kata Kelsou; Latin: Contra Celsum), preserved entirely in Greek, is a major apologetics work by the Church Father Origen of Alexandria, written in around 248 AD, countering the writings of Celsus, a pagan philosopher and controversialist who had written a scathing attack on Christianity in his treatise The True Word (Λόγος Ἀληθής, Logos Alēthēs). Among a variety of other charges, Celsus had denounced many Christian doctrines as irrational and criticized Christians themselves as uneducated, deluded, unpatriotic, close-minded towards reason, and too accepting of sinners. He had accused Jesus of performing his miracles using black magic rather than actual divine powers and of plagiarizing his teachings from Plato. Celsus had warned that Christianity itself was drawing people away from traditional religion and claimed that its growth would lead to a collapse of traditional, conservative values.

Origen wrote Contra Celsum at the request of his patron, a wealthy Christian named Ambrose, who insisted that a Christian needed to write a response to Celsus. In the treatise itself, which was aimed at an audience of people who were interested in Christianity but had not yet made the decision to convert, Origen responds to Celsus's arguments point-by-point from the perspective of a Platonic philosopher. After having questioned Celsus's credibility, Origen goes on to respond to Celsus's criticism with regard to the role of faith in Christianity, the identity of Jesus Christ, the allegorical interpretation of the Bible, and the relation between Christianity and traditional Greek religion.

Modern scholars note that Origen and Celsus actually agree on many points of doctrine, with both authors emphatically rejecting conventional notions of anthropomorphic deities, idolatry, and religious literalism. Contra Celsum is considered to be one of the most important works of early Christian apologetics; the church historian Eusebius lauded it as an adequate rebuttal to all criticisms the church would ever face, and it continued to be cited throughout late antiquity.

== Background ==
=== Celsus's The True Word ===
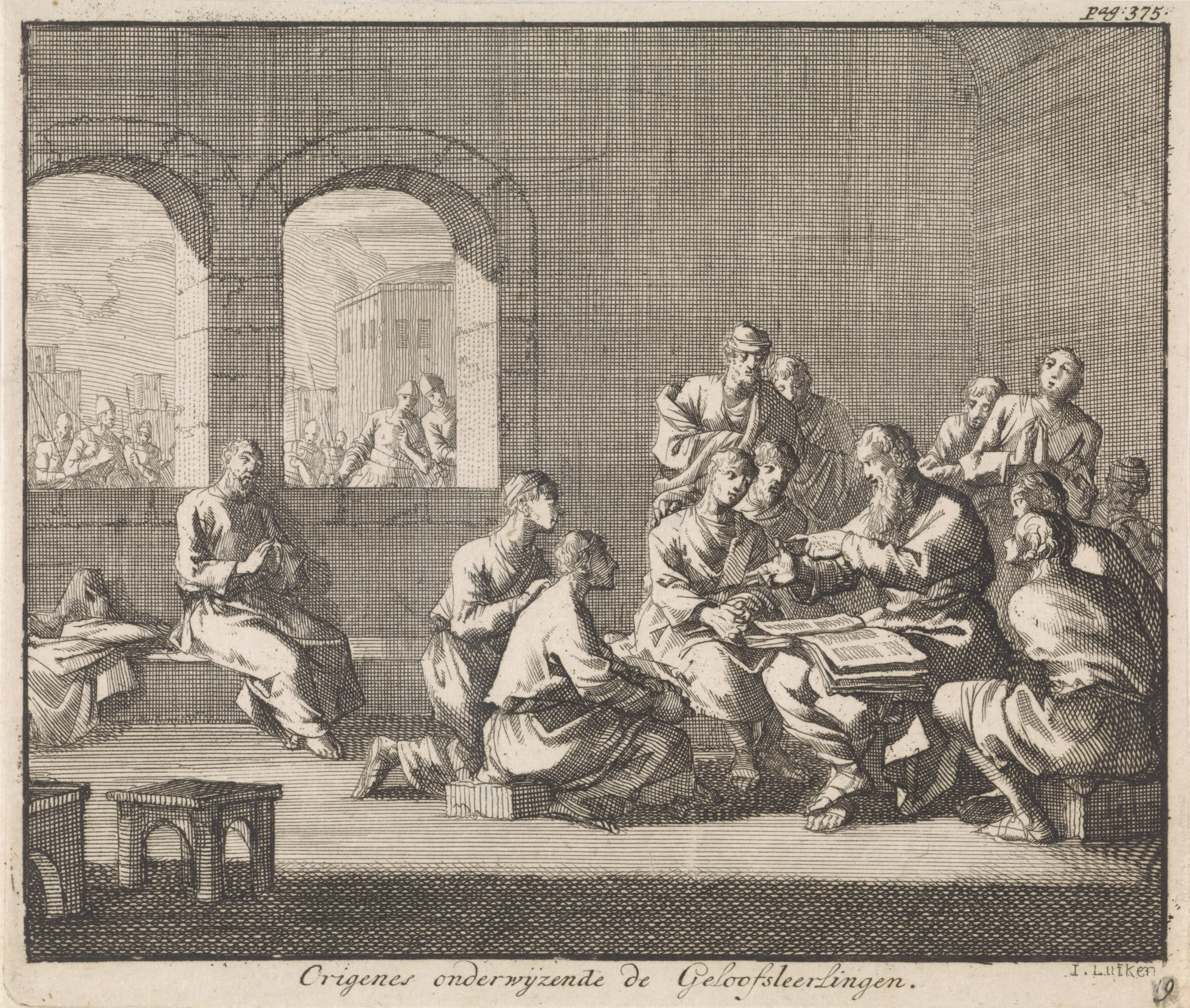
Dutch illustration by Jan Luyken (1700), showing Origen teaching his students. Origen wrote Contra Celsum around the same time he was trying to establish a Christian school at Caesarea.

The pagan philosopher Celsus had written a polemic entitled The True Word (Greek: Λόγος Ἀληθής, Logos Alēthēs), in which he had advanced numerous arguments against Christianity. Celsus refers to the Neopythagorean philosopher Numenius of Apamea, who lived during the late second century AD, on four occasions. This indicates that Celsus must have lived no earlier than the late second century. Many scholars have dated The True Word specifically to the reign of the Roman Emperor Marcus Aurelius (121–180 AD), due to Celsus's argument in Book VIII in which he promotes the ideas of duty to the state in both worship and in war, which are similar to ideas described by Marcus Aurelius in his Meditations. Robert Louis Wilken dates it to around 170 AD.

All that is known about Celsus personally is what comes from the surviving text of his book and from what Origen says about him. Although Origen initially refers to Celsus as an "Epicurean", his arguments reflect ideas of the Platonizing tradition, rather than Epicureanism. Origen attributes this to Celsus's inconsistency, but modern historians see it instead as evidence that Celsus was not an Epicurean at all. Joseph Wilson Trigg states that Origen probably confused Celsus, the author of The True Word, with a different Celsus, who was an Epicurean philosopher and a friend of the Syrian satirist Lucian. Celsus the Epicurean must have lived around the same time as the author of Contra Celsum and he is mentioned by Lucian in his treatise On Magic. Both Celsus the friend of Lucian and Celsus the author of The True Word evidently shared a passionate zeal against superstitio, making it even easier to see how Origen could have concluded that they were the same person.

Stephen Thomas states that Celsus may not have been a Platonist per se, but that he was clearly familiar with Plato. Celsus's actual philosophy appears to be a blend of elements derived from Platonism, Aristotelianism, Pythagoreanism, and Stoicism. Wilken likewise concludes that Celsus was a philosophical eclectic, whose views reflect a variety of ideas popular to a number of different schools. Wilken classifies Celsus as "a conservative intellectual", noting that "he supports traditional values and defends accepted beliefs". Theologian Robert M. Grant notes that Origen and Celsus actually agree on many points: "Both are opposed to anthropomorphism, to idolatry, and to any crudely literal theology." Celsus also writes as a loyal citizen of the Roman Empire and a devoted believer in Greco-Roman paganism, distrustful of Christianity as new and foreign.

Thomas remarks that Celsus "is no genius as a philosopher". Nonetheless, most scholars, including Thomas, agree that Origen's quotations from The True Word reveal that the work was well-researched. Celsus demonstrates extensive knowledge of both the Old and New Testaments and of both Jewish and Christian history. Celsus was also closely familiar with the literary features of ancient polemics. Celsus seems to have read at least one work by one of the second-century Christian apologists, possibly Justin Martyr or Aristides of Athens. From this reading, Celsus seems to have known which kinds of arguments Christians would be most vulnerable to. He also mentions the Ophites and Simonians, two Gnostic sects that had almost completely vanished by Origen's time. One of Celsus's main sources for Books I–II of The True Word was an earlier anti-Christian polemic written by an unknown Jewish author, whom Origen refers to as the "Jew of Celsus". This Jewish source also provides well-researched criticism of Christianity and, although Celsus was also hostile to Judaism, he occasionally relies on this Jewish author's arguments.

=== Origen's response ===
Contra Celsum was probably written in around 248 while Origen was living in Caesarea. According to the church historian Eusebius (c. 260 – c. 340 AD), Origen was over sixty years old when he began writing it. He was first introduced to Celsus's True Word by his friend and patron, a wealthy Christian named Ambrose. It is unclear how well known the book was at the time; Origen had previously never heard of it and Ambrose is the first Christian known to have read it. Joseph Wilson Trigg suggests that Ambrose may have been first exposed to the book through encounters with influential pagan intellectuals, who may have been turning to it to explain the ongoing decline of the Roman Empire as the ab urbe condita calendar approached the end of its first millennium. In any case, Ambrose considered the book an imminent threat to the continued growth of the Christian faith and believed that Origen needed to write a rebuttal to it.

The church's usual tactic for dealing with hostile writings was to ignore them; the reasoning behind this was that, eventually, the writings would be lost and all would be forgotten. This was therefore how the church chose to respond to Celsus. Origen initially followed this traditional response as well, arguing that this was the approach taken by Christ, pointing to Jesus's refusal to respond to Caiaphas during his trial before the Sanhedrin. Ambrose, however, continued to insist that Origen needed to write a response. Finally, one of Celsus's major claims, which held that no self-respecting philosopher of the Platonic tradition would ever be so stupid as to become a Christian, provoked Origen to write a rebuttal.

In his introduction, Origen specifically states that Contra Celsum is not intended for converted Christians, but rather for outsiders who were interested in the faith but who had not yet made the decision to convert. John Anthony McGuckin states that Origen probably undertook the task of writing Contra Celsum in the interest of furthering the Christian school he was trying to establish in Caesarea. According to McGuckin, Origen may have wanted to make sure that educated pagans who attended the school for their general education but became interested in Christianity as well would be able to consult a serious defense of the religion. Thus, he may have written Contra Celsum partially to address concerns that such students might have regarding Christianity.

== Summary ==
In the book, Origen systematically refutes each of Celsus's arguments point-by-point and argues that the Christian faith has a rational basis. Origen draws heavily on the teachings of Plato and argues that Christianity and Greek philosophy are not incompatible. Origen maintains that philosophy contains much that is true and admirable, but that the Bible contains far greater wisdom than anything Greek philosophers could ever grasp.

=== Celsus's credibility ===
Origen attempts to undermine Celsus's credibility first by labelling him an Epicurean, since, by the third century, Epicureanism was almost universally seen as discredited and wrong, because of its teachings of materialism, its denial of divine providence, and its hedonistic teachings on ethics. Nonetheless, Origen stops calling Celsus an Epicurean about halfway throughout the text, possibly because it was becoming increasingly difficult to present him as such in light of Celsus's self-evident sympathies for Plato. Origen also attempts to undermine Celsus's credibility by pointing out his ignorance on particular issues. In two cases, Origen points out problems in the literal interpretations of Biblical passages that Celsus himself had overlooked: the contradictory genealogies of Jesus given in the Gospels of Matthew and Luke, and the impossibility that Noah's Ark, if built according to the supposed measurements given in the Book of Genesis, could have held all the animals it is supposed to have held. Based on these examples, Origen attempts to show that Celsus's criticism is based on too literal interpretation of the Bible and therefore flawed. Origen also employs his training in textual analysis to question the integrity of Celsus's Jewish source. Origen points out that the supposed "Jewish" source refers to Old Testament prophecies that do not really exist, indicating that the author was unfamiliar with the Hebrew Bible. He also notes with suspicion that the "Jewish" source quotes the Greek tragedian Euripides and that it argues against the miracles described in the New Testament as irrational, even though the same argument could be equally applied to the miracles in the Hebrew Bible.

=== The role of faith in Christianity ===
Origen rejects many of Celsus's accusations against Christianity as false or inapplicable. In many cases, while ostensibly refuting Celsus, Origen is also refuting the ideas of fellow Christians whom he regarded as misinformed. For instance, in the act of denying Celsus's charge that Christians believed that their God was a wrathful old man who lived in the sky, Origen was also confronting Christians who actually believed this. He defends statements in the Bible promising that the wicked will be punished with fire by insisting that "the Logos, accommodating itself to what is appropriate to the masses who will read the Bible, wisely utters threatening words with a hidden meaning to frighten people who cannot in any other way turn from the flood of iniquities". Origen responds to Celsus's accusation that Christians denigrate reason and education in favor of faith by arguing that, while Christians do believe things on the basis of faith, this faith can be rationally justified; however, because few people are interested in the philosophical justification behind the religion, it is not normally taught, except to the wise.

Origen further objects that Greek philosophers typically accepted the doctrines of their philosophical schools without question, so it is therefore hypocritical for Celsus to condemn most Christians for doing the same thing. Contrary to Celsus's claim that Christians denigrate education, Origen argues that Christians actually study literature and philosophy in preparation for the mysteries of the faith. Origen responds to Celsus's accusation that Christians kept their doctrines secret by insisting that this charge is patently false and that most people, in fact, were far more familiar with what Christians believed than with what various Greek philosophical schools believed. He does argue that Christianity has always withheld its truly mystical teachings from the masses and reserved them exclusively for those who demonstrate true purity and detachment from the world, but states that Greek philosophical schools, such as Pythagoreanism, do precisely the same thing.

Origen argues that Christian faith is justified because of a "demonstration of the Spirit and of power", a phrase borrowed from the apostle Paul in 1 Corinthians 2:4. Origen argues that, even though people in his own time could not observe the miracles of Jesus or the apostles first hand, the effects that those miracles have had on the Christian community are plainly visible and must therefore have had a cause. Origen turns Celsus's sneers at Jesus's lowly birth against him by saying, "Yet he has been able to shake the whole human world, not only more than Themistocles the Athenian, but even more than Pythagoras and Plato and any other wise men or emperors or generals in any part of the world." Likewise, Origen responds to Celsus's disgust at the fact that Jesus chose lowly fishermen and peasants as his disciples by insisting that this only makes it all the more astonishing that the Christian gospel has been so successful, for, if Jesus had chosen men skilled in rhetoric as his emissaries, it would be no surprise that Christianity had managed to spread throughout the entire known world. Origen therefore interprets Christianity's success as evidence of God working to promote it in the world.

=== The identity of Jesus Christ ===
Origen's most serious disagreement with Celsus is over the identity of Jesus. Celsus argues that the Christian teaching of the incarnation of Jesus was intolerable and wrong because it not only entailed God changing, but changing for the worse. Origen replies to this by arguing that, since humans have become flesh, the Logos could not effectively reveal God to them without first becoming flesh itself. He states that this does not mean that the Logos originated from a human woman, but rather that it joined a human soul and body. While Celsus scoffs at the notion that the Logos would be incarnated so late in human history and in such an obscure place, Origen replies that the Logos has always guided humanity to reason, but that it fittingly became incarnate during the time of the Pax Romana when it would be possible for the message of God to spread without being impeded by wars and factionalism. Origen responds to Celsus's accusation that Jesus had performed his miracles using magic rather than divine powers by asserting that, unlike magicians, Jesus had not performed his miracles for show, but rather to reform his audiences. Origen defends Jesus's moral teachings against Celsus's accusation that they were merely plagiarized from Plato, stating that it is ridiculous to think that Jesus, a Galilean Jew, would have done such a thing. Instead, the similarities between Jesus and Plato are merely the result of the fact that the Logos, incarnate in Jesus, sometimes inspired Plato.

=== Allegorical interpretation ===
Celsus argues that the Christian interpretation of certain Biblical passages as allegorical was nothing more than a feeble attempt to disguise the barbarities of their scriptures. Origen refutes this by pointing out that Celsus himself supports without question the widely accepted view that the poems of Homer and Hesiod are allegories and accuses Celsus of having a double standard. Origen quotes several myths from Plato, comparing them to the myths of the Bible, and praising both as having sublime spiritual meanings. He then proceeds to attack the myths of Homer and Hesiod, including the castration of Ouranos and the creation of Pandora, labelling them as "not only very stupid, but also very impious".

Origen analyzes Biblical stories, such as those of the Garden of Eden and Lot's daughters, defending them against Celsus's charges of immorality. Finally, Origen defends the allegorical interpretations of the Bible, questioning whether Celsus had even read the truly philosophical writings about the Bible by the Jews Philo and Aristobulus of Alexandria, and the Neopythagorean Numenius of Apamea. In response to Celsus's charge that these allegorical interpretations are "preposterous", Origen points to several biblical passages which he interprets as justification for allegorical interpretation.

=== Christianity versus Greek religion ===
Celsus's primary reason for his denunciation of Christianity was because Christianity was not a traditional religion and because it led people to abandon the cults of their ancestors. Origen responds to this by insisting that ancestral cults are not always good. He asks Celsus if he would want the Scythians to bring back their old custom of parricide, the Persians their old custom of incest, or the Taurians and Libyans their old customs of human sacrifice. While Celsus saw Christianity's willingness to accept sinners as disgusting, Origen instead declares it praiseworthy, insisting that even the worst of sinners have the ability to repent and follow the path of holiness, giving examples of how Socrates converted Phaedo, a male prostitute, into a wise philosopher and how Xenocrates made Polemon, a notorious hell-raiser, into his successor as the head of the Platonic Academy. Celsus condemns Christian worship as tawdry, because they did not use temples, images, altars, or impressive ceremonies. Origen lauds such practice as glorious, saying that Christianity is the closest thing to truly spiritual worship.

Celsus accuses Christians of being unpatriotic, criticizing them for refusing to worship the emperor's genius and for refusing to serve in the Roman military. Origen states that the emperor's genius should not be worshipped, because, if the emperor's genius does not exist, then it is foolish to worship something that does not exist, and, if it does exist, then it is a demon and it is wicked to worship demons. Origen also defends Christian refusal to serve in the military, basing his arguments on statements in the Bible prohibiting violence and killing. He states that, if everyone were peaceful and loving like Christians, then there would be no wars and the Empire would not need a military. He furthermore declares that all Christians are priests and, just like pagan priests, they must refrain from violence and killing, which would make them impure.

Origen also makes a counterattack against Celsus's high-minded pagan philosophy by pointing out that even the great philosophers whom Celsus admired had worshipped idols. Origen insists that these philosophers knew better than to worship idols, quoting a fragment from the Pre-Socratic philosopher Heraclitus, who wrote "Those who approach lifeless things as gods are like a man who holds conversations with houses", and yet they compromised their philosophy by submitting to the conventions of popular religion. Therefore, Origen concludes that Christianity is more compatible with the tenets of Platonism than paganism itself and that Platonism can only become a practical rather than theoretical wisdom by being Christianized.

== Manuscripts ==
The complete text of Contra Celsum was preserved through the medieval manuscript tradition in a single manuscript, the Vaticanus graecus 386 (Α), which dates to the thirteenth century. This manuscript was copied by two scribes who had access to a low-quality manuscript filled with textual errors, but, after they had finished copying the manuscript, they gained access to a much better manuscript and made corrections to the text they had already copied. Although both scribes worked on the manuscript, one of them did the vast majority of the copying. Later scribes added more corrections to the Vaticanus graecus 386 in the fourteenth, early fifteenth, and late fifteenth centuries. Although other complete manuscripts of Contra Celsum have survived, these are all copies of the Vaticanus graecus 386 and are therefore not independent representatives of the text.

A large number of quotations from Contra Celsum, however, are also preserved through the Philokalia, an anthology of quotations and passages from Origen assembled in the fourth century by Basil of Caesarea and Gregory of Nazianzus. At least fifty manuscript copies of the Philokalia have survived, all of which are believed to have ultimately been copied from a single manuscript in the seventh century (Φ). Other quotations are also preserved in the Cairo papyrus N° 88747, which was discovered in 1941 in Tura, Egypt, not far outside of Cairo. The Tura Papyrus dates to the seventh century and is often closer to the text of the Vaticanus graecus 386 than to the archetypal seventh-century manuscript behind all copies of the Philokalia. Nonetheless, many passages in the Tura Papyrus are abbreviated or summarized.

== Reception and evaluation ==
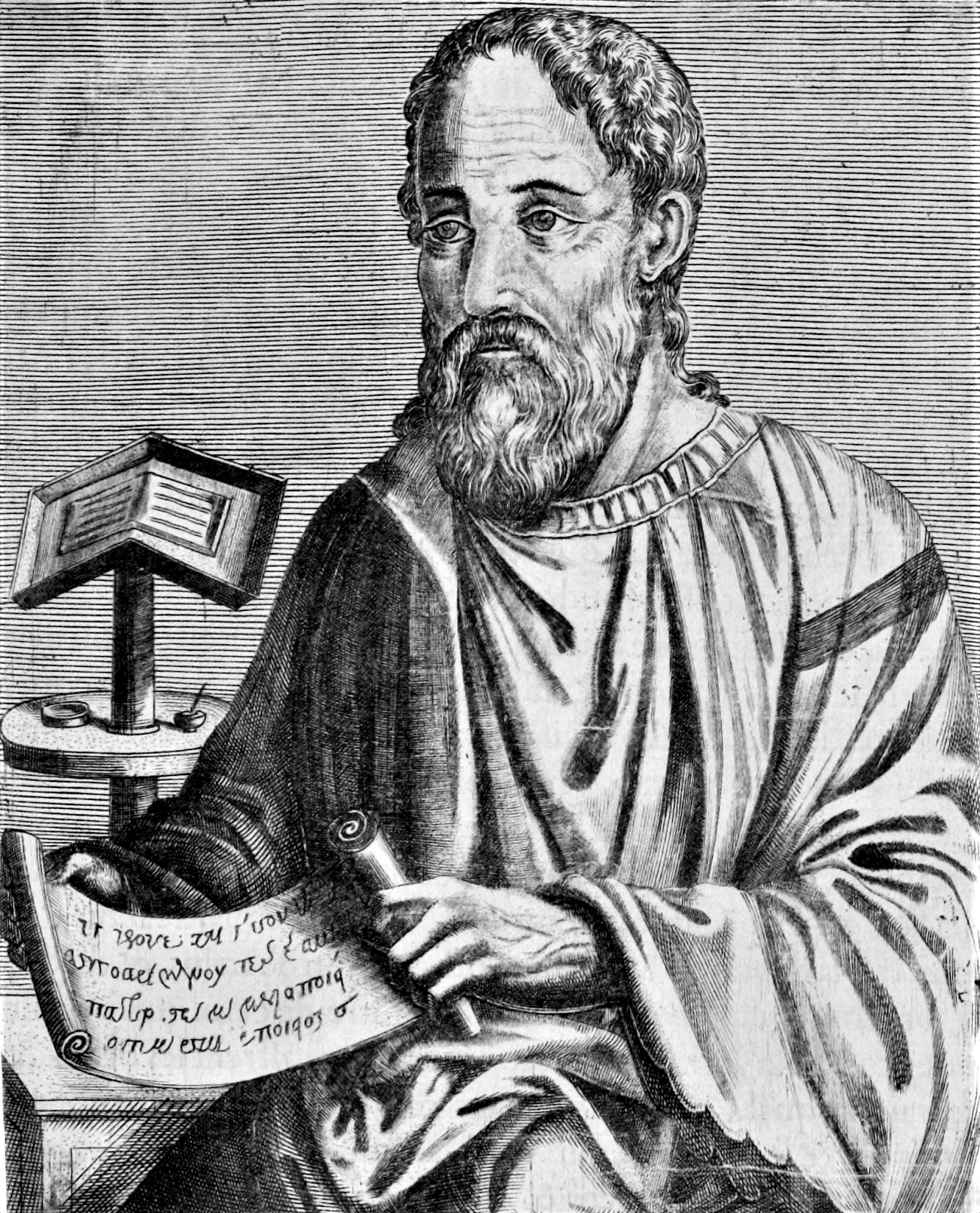
Eusebius, the early-fourth century bishop of Caesarea Maritima, shown here in an early modern imaginative representation, declared that Against Celsus provided an adequate rebuttal to all criticisms the church would ever face.

=== Historical ===
Contra Celsum became the most influential of all early Christian apologetics works; before it was written, Christianity was seen by many as merely a folk religion for the illiterate and uneducated, but Origen raised it to a level of academic respectability. Eusebius admired Contra Celsum so much that in his Contra Hieroclem, he declared that Contra Celsum provided an adequate rebuttal to all criticisms the church would ever face. The compilers of the Philokalia in the fourth century AD relied extensively on Contra Celsum and almost one seventh of the entire text of the Philokalia is directly quoted from it. Bessarion (1403–1472), a Greek refugee who fled to Italy after the Fall of Constantinople in 1453, produced the first Latin translation of Origen's Contra Celsum, which was printed in 1481.

=== Modern ===
Early modern scholarly assessments of Origen's Contra Celsum took a very negative view of it. The German scholar Franz Overbeck (1837–1905) derided Origen for his "base method of dispute". Robert Bader argued that the supposed ability of modern scholars to reconstruct Celsus's original text is illusory. The theologian Carl Andresen (1909–1985) went even further, claiming that Origen had quoted Celsus selectively and out of context in such a way that his portrayal of Celsus's arguments is completely inaccurate. The German philologist Heinrich Dörrie (1911–1983) questioned Origen's philosophical competence. In the mid-twentieth century, scholarly assessment of Contra Celsum began to become less overtly negative; Horacio E. Lona's Die 'Wahre Lehre' des Kelsos was less derogatory towards Origen than the writings of previous scholars. In the late twentieth century, the commentators Marcel Borret and Henry Chadwick both took positive assessments of Origen's criticism, drawing attention to Origen's formally correct logic and his philosophical competence.

Modern scholars now generally assess Contra Celsum in a positive light. Most scholars reject Andresen's view that Origen falsified or intentionally misrepresented Celsus's work, noting that Origen's highly complex and philosophical refutations imply that he viewed Celsus as having a high level of intellectual competence and that he was worthy of a serious, scholarly response. Scholars also note that Origen makes continuous reference to the ancient rules of dialectal debate, as well as his intention to follow those rules to the letter. Furthermore, it seems implausible that Origen would devote so much time and attention to refuting Celsus unless he was actually refuting what Celsus had written. Adam Gregerman and John Anthony McGuckin both praise Origen for his intellectual honesty, with Gregerman noting that "even at his most dismissive, Origen quotes and responds to Celsus' views."

Gregerman also comments on the broad variety of evidence Origen employs to support his refutations, including evidence from "history, logic, Greek myths, philosophy, and interpretations of Scripture". He calls Contra Celsum "an early Christian apologetics work of almost unequalled value". Henri Crouzel, a scholar of early Christianity, calls Contra Celsum "alongside Augustine's City of God, the most important apologetic writing of antiquity". Johannes Quasten appraises it as "the greatest apology of the primitive Church". Joseph Wilson Trigg describes Contra Celsum as "the greatest apology ever written in Greek". McGuckin describes Contra Celsum as "the first draft... of a sustained Christian reflection on the evangelization of Hellenic culture that was to move at greater pace in the Cappadocian fathers in the fourth century and finally become the intellectual charter of Christian Byzantium—'the Christianization of Hellenism,' as Florovsky called it".

Despite these laudatory remarks, Stephen Thomas criticizes Against Celsus as poorly organized. According to Thomas, Origen initially planned to refute each of Celsus's arguments point-by-point. Once he had already started this method, however, Origen apparently changed his mind and decided to instead take a more systematic approach of only refuting the main points of Celsus's argument. As a result, Origen conflated the two approaches, meaning his refutations grow longer and longer as the work progresses. Thomas concludes that "The lasting value of the work remains largely its character as a rich thesaurus for Christian apologetics, more than as a reasoned apologetic in itself."

== Translations ==
Henry Chadwick made an English translation that was published in 1953 by Cambridge University Press.

== See also ==
- Codex Parisinus Graecus 456
