= Nikolaus Kempf =

German theologian (c.1414–1497)

Start of Kempf's De ostensione regni dei, manuscript copied in 1468

Nikolaus Kempf (c. 1414 – 20 November 1497) was a German mystical theologian. He was a professor at the University of Vienna until he became a Carthusian monk in 1440. He served as the prior of three different charterhouses between 1447 and 1490. Over 35 works have been attributed to him.

== Life ==
Kempf was born around 1414 in Strasbourg. His father's name is not known. His mother, Elisabeth, died in 1461; his brother Matthias in 1474; and his sister Elisabeth in 1467. By 1433, he was teaching at the University of Vienna. By 1437, he was one of the regent masters there. On 6 September 1440, he entered the Gaming Charterhouse as a monk. He served as the prior of the charterhouses of Jurklošter (1447–1451, 1467–1490), Gaming (1451–1458) and Pleterje (1462–1467). He died on 20 November 1497 in Gaming.

== Works ==
There are over thirty-five works in Latin attributed to Kempf, although not all survive.

1. Disputata super Libros posteriorum Aristotelis (1439), a disputation on the Posterior Analytics
2. Regulae grammaticales (before 1440), a treatise on grammar
3. Tractatus de sollicitudine superiorum habenda erga subditorum et innocentiam custodiam (before 1456), a pedagogical treatise on bringing up children in the fear of God
4. Dialogus de recto studiorum fine ac ordine et fugiendis vitae saecularis vanitatibus (1447), a tract for monastic novices
5. Tractatus de proponentibus religionis ingressum de anna probacionis usque ad professionem inclusive (before 1451), a treatise on the novitiate
6. De discretione (begun before 1449), a dialogue between Humility and Pride
7. De tribus essentialibus omnium religiosorum, a treatise on obedience, voluntary poverty and chastity
8. De vera, perfecta, et spirituali caritate (c. 1450)
9. De vera et falsa caritate inter fratres in unum habitantes (c. 1450)
10. De peccatis caritati contrariis scilicet inpatientia, ira, invidia, et odio et suis filiabus et nepotatibus (c. 1450)
11. De suspicionibus (c. 1450)
12. Tractatus de capitulo religiosorum (in 1450–1465), a long discourse on the weekly chapter of faults
13. Memoriale primorum principiorum in seolis virtutum (in 1441–1462)
14. A pair of sermons: Sermones super epistolas et evangelia de tempore per totum annum and Super evangelia
15. De confirmatione et regula approbata ordinis cartusiensis (in 1452–1460), a defence of the Carthusian order
16. Tractatus de colloquio (before 1467), a treatise on the sins of the tongue
17. Super statuta ordinis cartusiensis (before 1467)
18. De ostensione regni Dei (c. 1465), a summary of Kempf's mystical theology, based on material originally delivered to monks orally and thus containing some German phrases
19. Tractatus de mystica theologia (c. 1462)
20. Explanatio in Cantica canticorum (c. 1463), a work of 400 pages in eight parts on the Song of Songs, containing some German phrases
21. Tractatus de affectibus formandis in horis sive in officio divino (in 1445–1452)
22. Expositio canonis totius missae (before 1452), a series of glosses on the words of the Divine Office
23. Sermones sanctorum dies et festis, a cycle of sermons

Works 8–11 on love and vice were usually copied as a group.

Among the known lost works of Kempf are De modo confitendi peccata venialia; all of his letters; and treatises on the Lord's Prayer, the Apostles' Creed and the Ten Commandments written for Elizabeth of Luxembourg. Kempf is reported to have translated several works, including some of his own, into German, but none of these survive. Among these translations are his own De discretione, De capitulo and De affectibus formandis in horis sive officio divino; sermons of Pseudo-Augustine and Pseudo-Origen; the Tractatus de proprietate monachorum of Heinrich von Langenstein; and works of Jean Gerson. On the basis of these reports, Kempf has been associated with the Viennese school of translation. The translation of the Carthusian statutes into German at Gaming may have taken place under Kempf's supervision.

== Works cited ==
- Martin, Dennis D. (1992). Fifteenth-Century Carthusian Reform: The World of Nicholas Kempf. Brill.
