= Codex Parisinus Graecus 456 =

Codex Parisinus Graecus 456, designated by siglum H, manuscript of Origen's Philocalia and Contra Celsum.

== Description ==
The manuscript contains text of Origen's Philocalia. It is very closely related to Codex Venetus Graecus 48, but not copied from it.

It contains also Arrian's Expeditio Alexandri immediately after the Philocalia. It contains also some iambics of the monk Bessarion on the death of Theodora.

== History ==
The manuscript was brought to Paris from Constantinople. Today it is housed at the Bibliothèque nationale de France (Gr. 456) in Paris.
