= Commentary on Romans (Pelagius) =

Commentary on Romans is a commentary of Epistle to the Romans written before 410 by British ascetic Pelagius. It is Pelagius' longest extant work.

== Reception ==
In 412, Augustine read Pelagius' Commentary on Romans and described its author as a "highly advanced Christian", although he disagreed with Pelagius' exegesis of Romans 5:12, which he believed downplayed original sin.

== Sources ==
- Scheck, Thomas P. (2012). "Pelagius's Interpretation of Romans". In Cartwright, Steven (ed.). A Companion to St. Paul in the Middle Ages. Leiden: Brill. pp. 79–114. ISBN 978-90-04-23671-4.
