= Commentary on Job =

There have been many commentaries on the biblical Book of Job.

- Selecta of Job by Origen (d. c. 253)
- Commentarius in Iob by Maximinus the Arian (4th century)
- a commentary by Pseudo-Ignatius (4th century)
- Exerpta in Job by Athanasius of Alexandria (d. 373)
- a commentary by Didymus the Blind (d. 398)
- a commentary by Hesychius of Jerusalem (5th century)
- a commentary by Julian the Arian (5th century)
- a fragmentary commentary by Elishaʿ bar Quzbaye (5th/6th century)
- Moralia in Job (578–595) by Gregory the Great
- a commentary by Moses ibn Gikatilla (11th century)
- a fragmentary commentary by Eliezer of Beaugency (12th century)
- Expositio in Job ad litteram (1260) by Thomas Aquinas
- Mazmerot Kesef by Joseph Ibn Kaspi (d. 1345)
- a commentary by Abba Mari ben Eligdor (14th century)
- a commentary by Joel ibn Shu'aib (15th century)
- Piẓ'ei Ohev by Israel ben Moses Najara (d. c. 1625)
- a commentary by Joseph Caryl (d. 1673)
- Kommentar zum Hiob (1839) by Ludwig Hirzel
- Safah le-ne'emanim (1854) by Naḥman Isaac Fischmann
- Commentary on Job (1886) by Benjamin Szold
- The New World (1942), published by the Watch Tower Society
- Job: An Introduction and Commentary (1976) by Francis Andersen
- A Commentary on Job: Now Mine Eye Seeth Thee by Homer Hailey (d. 2000)
- Deconstructing Theodicy: A Philosophical Commentary on Job (2008) by David Burrell
