= Philocalia (Origen) =

4th century book of excerpts from Origen

Origen's Philocalia (Ancient Greek: Φιλοκαλία) is an anthology of Origen's texts, probably compiled by Basil the Great and Gregory Nazianzen. It was probably compiled during their monastic retreat in Pontus in the late 350s to early 360s, or in any event early in their careers and before their own theological writings. Many of Origen's works are lost and consequently the extracts in the anthology are valuable today. It should not be confused with the medieval Philokalia.

The work is divided into twenty-seven chapters, with titles given by the compilers. About a fifth of it is taken from Contra Celsum.

Opinion is divided about who compiled the Philocalia. Basil and Gregory are described as the compilers in the Greek text itself, and this is generally accepted. Eric Junod, the editor of the French edition of chapters 21–27, accepts both as the authors. But M. Harl, editor of chapters 1–20 in the same series, questions this, as do others. Gregory Nazianzen sent a letter to a friend which supports the traditional attribution.

A number of medieval manuscripts preserve the work, including Codex Parisinus Graecus 456.
