= Origen =

Christian theologian (c. 185 – c. 253)

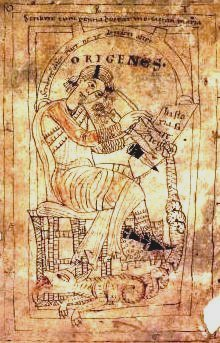
- Origen as depicted c. 1160
- Born: c. 185 AD; Alexandria, Province of Egypt, Roman Empire
- Died: c. 253 AD (aged c. 69); Probably Tyre, Province of Phoenice, Roman Empire
- Father: Leonides of Alexandria

Education
- Education: Catechetical School of Alexandria
- Academic advisor: Ammonius Saccas

Philosophical work
- Era: Ancient philosophy
- School: Neoplatonism; Christian philosophy Alexandrian school
- Main interests: Biblical hermeneutics; Christian apologetics; Christian theology; Textual criticism
- Notable works: Contra Celsum; On the First Principles; Hexapla
- Notable ideas: Allegorical interpretation of the Bible; Apocatastasis; Asceticism; Christian pacifism; Free will; Incorporeality of God; Logos theology; Pre-existence of souls; Ransom theory of atonement; Subordinationism; Universalism; Purgatory

Origen of Alexandria (Note: /ˈɒrɪdʒən/ OR-ih-jən; Ancient Greek: Ὠριγένης Ōrigénēs; Origen's Greek name Ōrigénēs (Ὠριγένης) probably means 'child of Horus' (from Ὧρος Hṓros 'Horus', and γένος génos 'born').) (c. 185 – c. 253), also known as Origen Adamantius, (Note: Ὠριγένης Ἀδαμάντιος, Ōrigénēs Adamántios. The nickname or cognomen Adamantios (Ἀδαμάντιος) derives from Greek adámas (ἀδάμας), which means 'adamant', 'unalterable', 'unbreakable', 'unconquerable', 'diamond'.) was an early Christian theologian and ascetic. He was a prolific writer who wrote roughly 2,000 treatises in multiple branches of theology, including textual criticism, biblical exegesis and hermeneutics, homiletics, and spirituality. He was one of the most influential and controversial figures in early Christian theology, apologetics, and asceticism. He has been described by John Anthony McGuckin as "the greatest genius the early church ever produced".

Origen founded the Christian School of Caesarea, where he taught logic, cosmology, natural history, and theology, and became regarded by the churches of Palestine and Arabia as the ultimate authority on all matters of theology. He was tortured for his faith during the Decian persecution in 250 and died three to four years later from his injuries.

Origen produced a massive quantity of writings because of the patronage of his close friend Ambrose of Alexandria, who provided him with a team of secretaries to copy his works, making him one of the most prolific writers in late antiquity. His treatise On the First Principles systematically laid out the principles of Christian theology and became the foundation for later theological writings. He also authored Contra Celsum, one of the most influential works of early Christian apologetics. Origen produced the Hexapla, the first critical edition of the Hebrew Bible, which contained the original Hebrew text, four different Greek translations, and a Greek transliteration of the Hebrew, all written in columns, side by side. He wrote hundreds of sermons covering almost the entire Bible, interpreting many passages as allegorical. Origen was the first to propose the ransom theory of atonement in its fully developed form, and he also significantly contributed to the development of the concept of the Trinity. Origen hoped that all people might eventually attain salvation but was always careful to maintain that this was only speculation. He defended free will and advocated Christian pacifism.

Origen is considered by some Christian groups to be a Church Father. He is widely regarded as one of the most influential Christian theologians. His teachings were especially influential in the east, with Athanasius of Alexandria and the three Cappadocian Fathers being among his most devoted followers. Argument over the orthodoxy of Origen's teachings spawned the First Origenist Crisis in the late fourth century, in which he was attacked by Epiphanius of Salamis and Jerome but defended by Tyrannius Rufinus and John of Jerusalem. In 543, Emperor Justinian I condemned him as a heretic and ordered all his writings to be burned. The Second Council of Constantinople in 553 may have anathematized Origen, or it may have only condemned certain heretical teachings which claimed to be derived from Origen. The Church rejected his teachings on the pre-existence of souls.

== Biography ==
Almost all information about Origen's life comes from a lengthy biography of him in the Ecclesiastical History written by the Christian historian Eusebius (c. 260 – c. 340). Eusebius portrays Origen as the perfect Christian scholar and a literal saint. Eusebius, however, wrote this account almost fifty years after Origen's death and had access to few reliable sources on Origen's life, especially his early years. Anxious for more material, Eusebius recorded events based only on unreliable hearsay evidence, and frequently made speculative inferences. Nonetheless, scholars can reconstruct a general impression of Origen's historical life by sorting out the parts of Eusebius's account that are accurate from those that are inaccurate.

=== Early years ===
Origen was born in either 185 or 186 AD in Alexandria. Porphyry called him "a Greek, and educated in Greek literature". According to Eusebius, Origen's father was Leonides of Alexandria, a respected professor of literature and a devout Christian who practised his religion openly (and later a martyr and saint). Eusebius also stated that Leonides was of Greek nationality. Joseph Wilson Trigg deems the details of this report unreliable, but admits that Origen's father was certainly at least "a prosperous and thoroughly Hellenized bourgeois". According to John Anthony McGuckin, Origen's mother, whose name is unknown, may have been a member of the lower class who did not have the right of citizenship. Epiphanius wrote that Origen's mother was a native Egyptian.

It is likely that, due to his mother's status, Origen was not a Roman citizen. Origen's father taught him about literature and philosophy as well as the Bible and Christian doctrine. Eusebius states that Origen's father made him memorize passages of scripture daily. Trigg accepts this tradition as possibly genuine, given Origen's ability as an adult to recite extended passages of scripture. Eusebius also reports that Origen became so learned about the scriptures at an early age that his father was unable to answer his questions about them.

In 202, when Origen was "not yet seventeen", Emperor Septimius Severus ordered Roman citizens who openly practised Christianity to be executed. Origen's father Leonides was arrested and thrown in prison. Eusebius reports that Origen wanted to turn himself in to the authorities so that they would execute him as well, but his mother hid all his clothes and he was unable to go to the authorities since he refused to leave the house naked. According to McGuckin, even if Origen had turned himself in, it is unlikely that he would have been punished, since the emperor was only intent on executing Roman citizens. Origen's father was beheaded, and the state confiscated the family's entire property, leaving them impoverished. Origen was the eldest of nine children, and as his father's heir, it became his responsibility to provide for the whole family.

When he was eighteen, Origen was appointed as a catechist at the Catechetical School of Alexandria. Many scholars have assumed that Origen became the head of the school, but according to McGuckin, this is highly improbable. It is more likely that he was given a paid teaching position, perhaps as a "relief effort" for his impoverished family. While employed at the school, he adopted the ascetic lifestyle of the Greek Sophists. He spent the whole day teaching and would stay up late at night writing treatises and commentaries. He went barefoot and only owned one cloak. He did not drink alcohol and ate a simple diet and he often fasted for long periods. Although Eusebius goes to great lengths to portray Origen as one of the Christian monastics of his era, this portrayal is now generally recognized as anachronistic.

According to Eusebius, as a young man, Origen was taken in by a wealthy Gnostic woman, who was also the patron of a very influential Gnostic theologian from Antioch, who frequently lectured in her home. Eusebius goes to great lengths to insist that, although Origen studied while in her home, he never once "prayed in common" with her or the Gnostic theologian. Later, Origen succeeded in converting a wealthy man named Ambrose from Valentinian Gnosticism to orthodox Christianity. Ambrose was so impressed by the young scholar that he gave Origen a house, a secretary, seven stenographers, a crew of copyists and calligraphers, and paid for all of his writings to be published.

When he was in his early twenties, Origen sold the small library of Greek literary works that he had inherited from his father for a sum which netted him a daily income of four obols. He used this money to continue his study of the Bible and of philosophy. Origen studied at numerous schools throughout Alexandria, including the Platonic Academy of Alexandria, where he was a student of Ammonius Saccas. Eusebius claims that Origen studied under Clement of Alexandria, but according to McGuckin, this is almost certainly a retrospective assumption based on the similarity of their teachings. Origen rarely mentions Clement in his writings, and when he does, it is usually to correct him.

=== Alleged self-castration ===
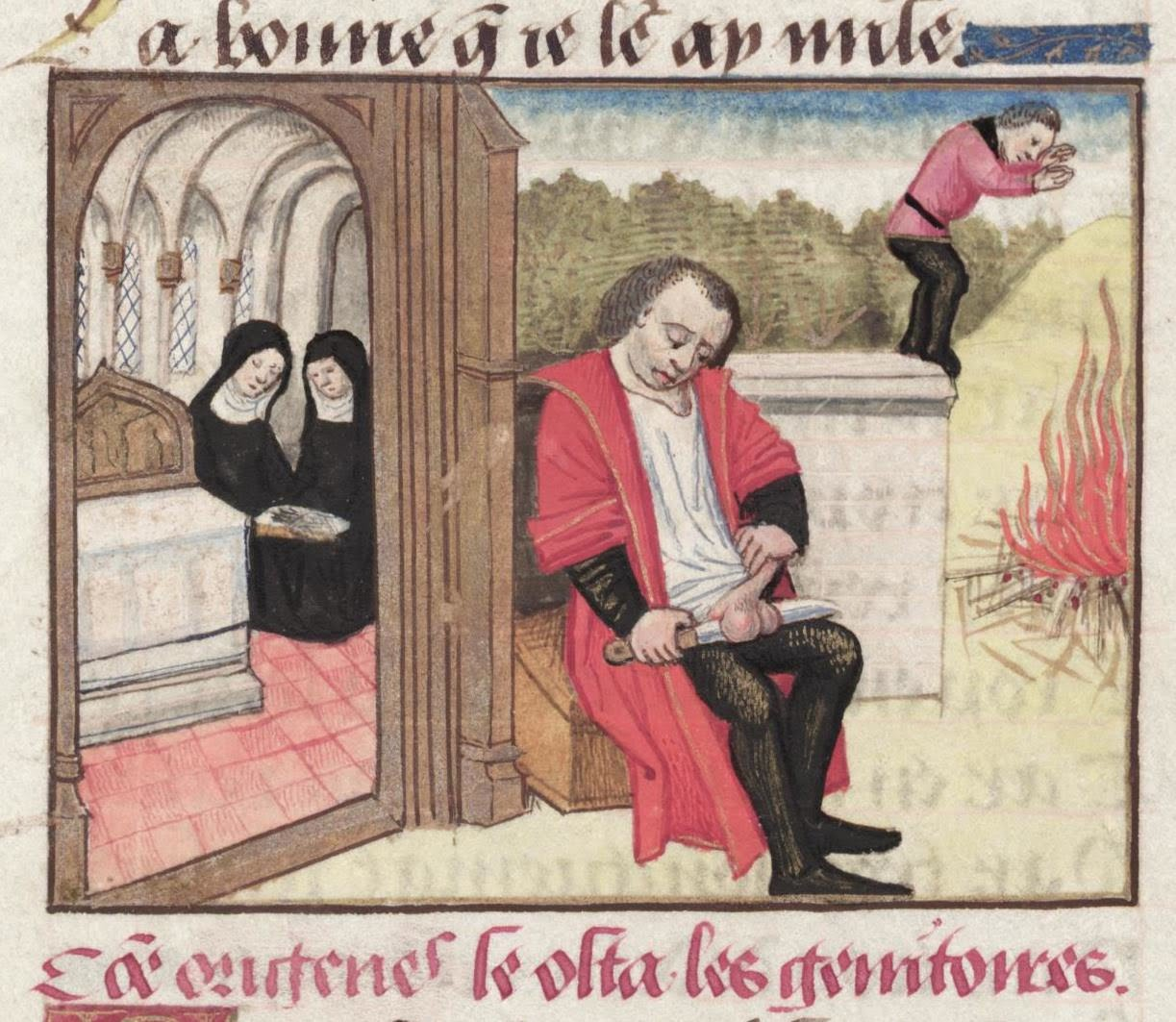
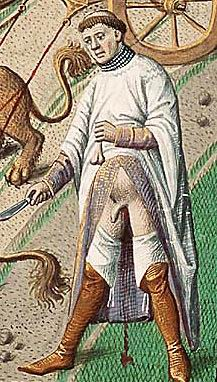
Eusebius claims in his Ecclesiastical History that, as a young man, Origen secretly paid a physician to surgically castrate him, a claim which affected Origen's reputation for centuries, as demonstrated by these fifteenth-century depictions of Origen castrating himself.

Eusebius claims that, as a young man, following a literal reading of Matthew 19:12, in which Jesus is presented as saying "there are eunuchs who have made themselves eunuch for the sake of the kingdom of heaven", Origen either castrated himself or had someone else castrate him in order to ensure his reputation as a respectable tutor. Eusebius further alleges that Origen privately told Demetrius, the bishop of Alexandria, about the castration and that Demetrius initially praised him for his devotion to God on account of it.

Origen, however, never mentions anything about having castrated himself in any of his surviving writings. In his explanation of this verse in his Commentary on the Gospel of Matthew, written near the end of life, he strongly condemns any literal interpretation of Matthew 19:12, asserting that only an idiot would interpret the passage as advocating literal castration.

Since the beginning of the twentieth century, some scholars have questioned the historicity of Origen's self-castration, with many seeing it as a wholesale fabrication. Trigg states that Eusebius's account of Origen's self-castration is certainly true, because Eusebius, who was an ardent admirer of Origen, yet clearly describes the castration as an act of pure folly, would have had no motive to pass on a piece of information that might tarnish Origen's reputation unless it was "notorious and beyond question". Trigg sees Origen's condemnation of the literal interpretation of Matthew 19:12 as him "tacitly repudiating the literalistic reading he had acted on in his youth".

In sharp contrast, McGuckin dismisses Eusebius's story of Origen's self-castration as "hardly credible", seeing it as a deliberate attempt by Eusebius to distract from more serious questions regarding the orthodoxy of Origen's teachings. McGuckin also states: "We have no indication that the motive of castration for respectability was ever regarded as standard by a teacher of mixed-gender classes." He adds that Origen's female students would have been accompanied by attendants at all times, meaning that Origen would have had no good reason to think that anyone would suspect him of impropriety.

Henry Chadwick argues that, while Eusebius's story may be true, it seems unlikely, given that Origen's exposition of Matthew 19:12 "strongly deplored any literal interpretation of the words". Instead, Chadwick suggests, "Perhaps Eusebius was uncritically reporting malicious gossip retailed by Origen's enemies, of whom there were many." McGuckin similarly notes that Origen "himself derides the literalist interpretation of the eunuch, saying it was something only an idiot would consider. His tone suggests quite clearly that he regards the idea as offensive, and Origen's text ought always to be preferred as a historical source over and above Eusebius."

=== Travels and early writings ===
A map of the Mediterranean showing locations associated with Origen

In his early twenties Origen became less interested in work as a grammarian and more interested in operating as a rhetor-philosopher. He gave his job as a catechist to his younger colleague Heraclas. Meanwhile, Origen began to style himself as a "master of philosophy". Origen's new position as a self-styled Christian philosopher brought him into conflict with Demetrius, the bishop of Alexandria. Demetrius, a charismatic leader who ruled the Christian congregation of Alexandria with an iron fist, became the most direct promoter of the elevation in status of the bishop of Alexandria; before Demetrius, the bishop of Alexandria had merely been a priest who was elected to represent his fellows, but after Demetrius, the bishop was seen as clearly a rank higher than his fellow priests. By styling himself as an independent philosopher, Origen was reviving a role that had been prominent in earlier Christianity but which challenged the authority of the now-powerful bishop.

Meanwhile, Origen began composing his massive theological treatise On the First Principles, a landmark book which systematically laid out the foundations of Christian theology for centuries to come. Origen also began travelling abroad to visit schools across the Mediterranean. In 212 he travelled to Rome – a major center of philosophy at the time. In Rome, Origen attended lectures by Hippolytus of Rome and was influenced by his logos theology. In 213 or 214, the governor of the Province of Arabia sent a message to the prefect of Egypt requesting him to send Origen to meet with him so that he could interview him and learn more about Christianity from its leading intellectual. Origen, escorted by official bodyguards, spent a short time in Arabia with the governor before returning to Alexandria.

In the autumn of 215, the Roman Emperor Caracalla visited Alexandria. During the visit, the students at the schools there protested and made fun of him for having murdered his brother Geta (died 211). Caracalla, incensed, ordered his troops to ravage the city, execute the governor, and kill all the protesters. He also commanded them to expel all the teachers and intellectuals from the city. Origen fled Alexandria and traveled to the city of Caesarea Maritima in the Roman province of Palestine, where the bishops Theoctistus of Caesarea and Alexander of Jerusalem became his devoted admirers and asked him to deliver discourses on the scriptures in their respective churches. This effectively allowed Origen to deliver sermons even though he was not formally ordained. While this was an unexpected phenomenon, especially given Origen's international fame as a teacher and philosopher, it infuriated Demetrius, who saw it as a direct undermining of his authority. Demetrius sent deacons from Alexandria to demand that the Palestinian hierarchs immediately return "his" catechist to Alexandria. He also issued a decree chastising the Palestinians for allowing a person who was not ordained to preach. The Palestinian bishops, in turn, issued their condemnation, accusing Demetrius of being jealous of Origen's fame and prestige.

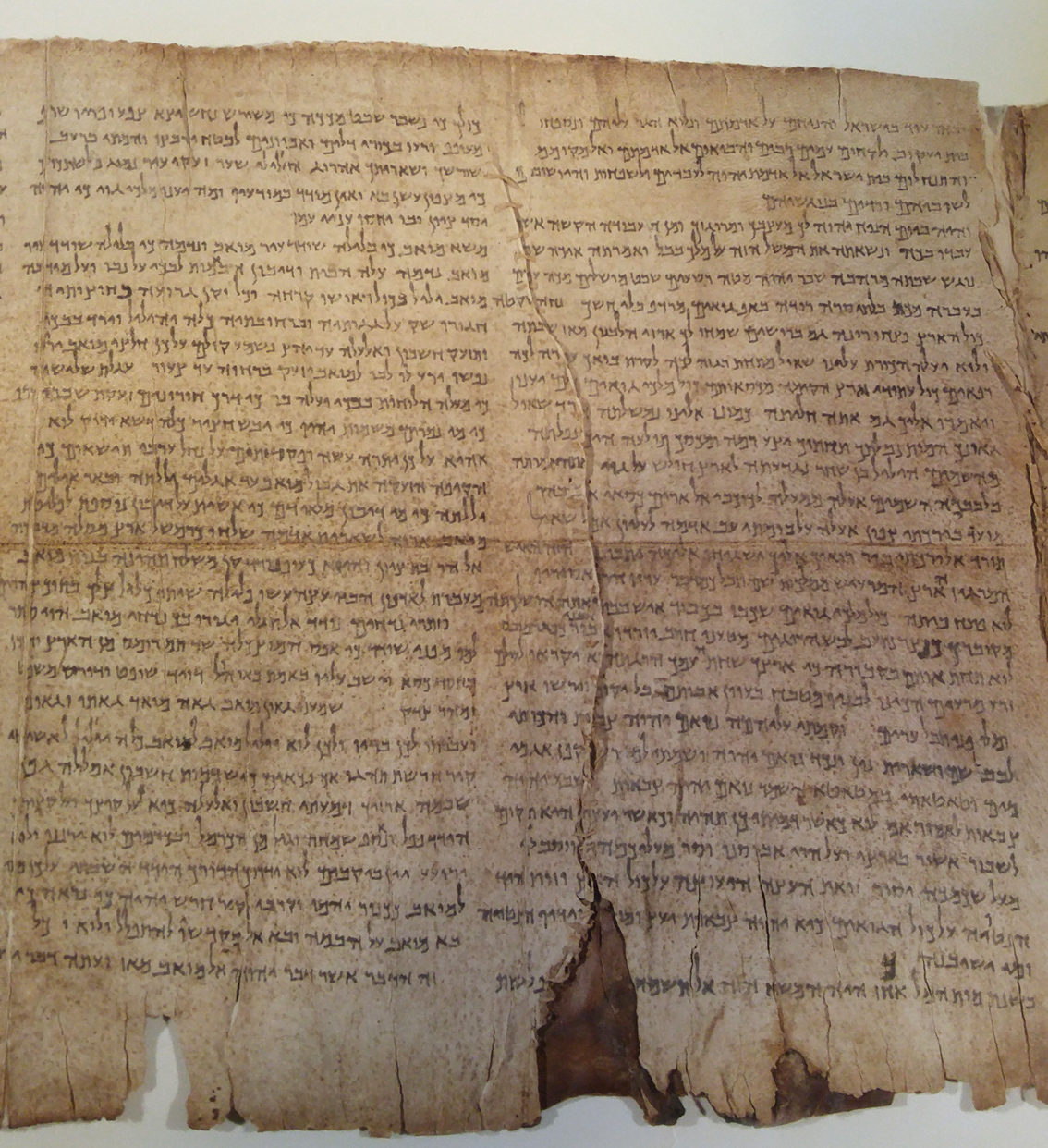
While in Jericho, Origen bought an ancient manuscript of the Hebrew Bible which had been discovered "in a jar", a discovery which prefigures the later discovery of the Dead Sea Scrolls in the twentieth century. Shown here: a section of the Isaiah scroll from Qumran.

Origen obeyed Demetrius's order and returned to Alexandria, bringing with him an antique scroll he had purchased at Jericho containing the full text of the Hebrew Bible. The manuscript, which had purportedly been found "in a jar", became the source text for one of the two Hebrew columns in Origen's Hexapla. Origen studied the Old Testament in great depth; Eusebius even claims that Origen learned Hebrew. Most modern scholars regard this claim as implausible, but they disagree over how much Origen knew about the language. H. Lietzmann concludes that Origen probably only knew the Hebrew alphabet and not much else, whereas R. P. C. Hanson and G. Bardy argue that Origen had a superficial understanding of the language but not enough to have composed the entire Hexapla. A note in Origen's On the First Principles mentions an unknown "Hebrew master", but this was probably a consultant, not a teacher.

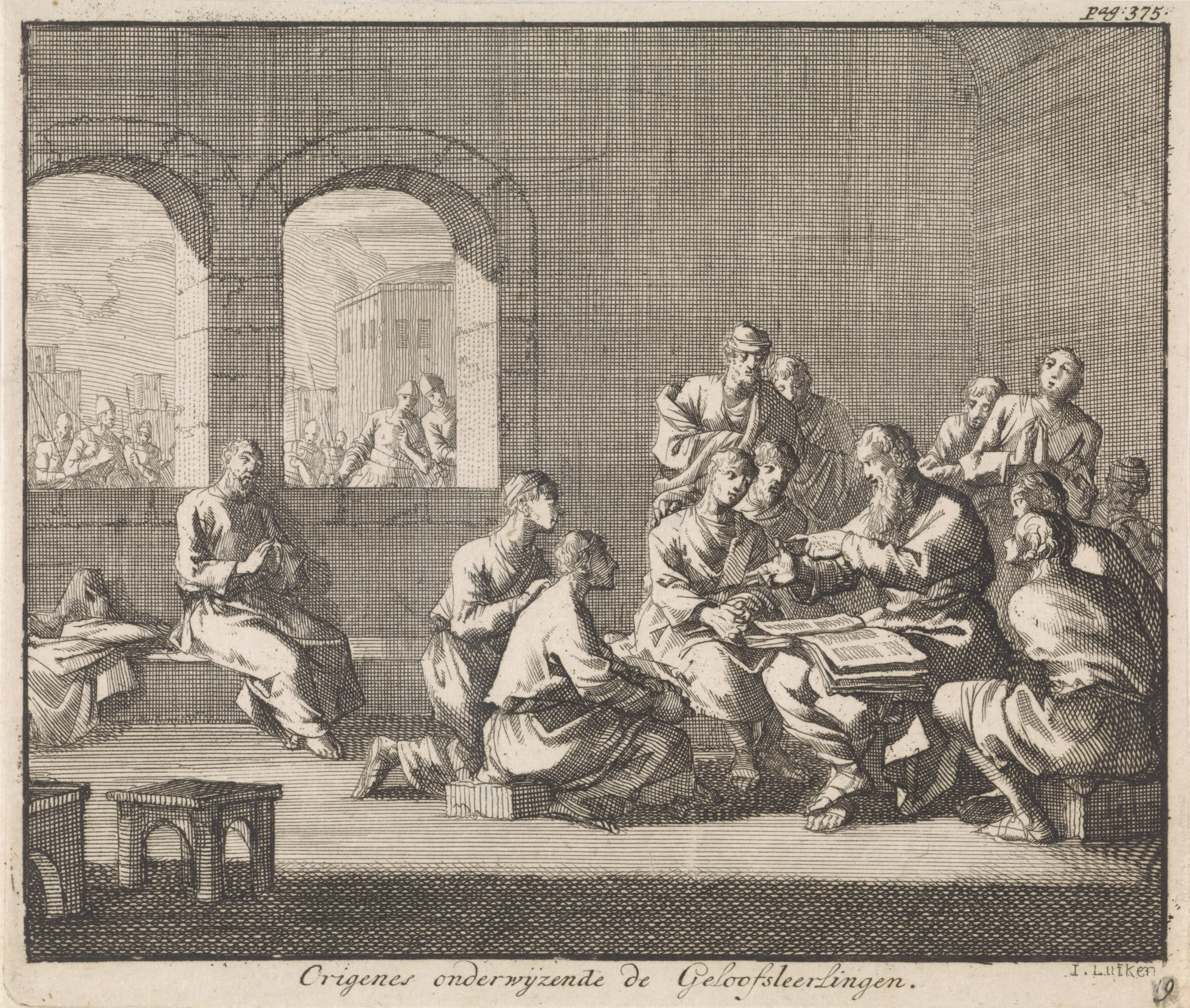
Dutch illustration by Jan Luyken (1700), showing Origen teaching his students

Origen also studied the entire New Testament, but especially the epistles of the apostle Paul and the Gospel of John, the writings which Origen regarded as the most important and authoritative. At Ambrose's request, Origen composed the first five books of his exhaustive Commentary on the Gospel of John, He also wrote the first eight books of his Commentary on Genesis, his Commentary on Psalms 1–25, and his Commentary on Lamentations. In addition to these commentaries, Origen also wrote two books on the resurrection of Jesus and ten books of Stromata ('Miscellanies'). It is likely that these works contained much theological speculation, which brought Origen into even greater conflict with Demetrius.

=== Conflict with Demetrius and removal to Caesarea ===
Origen repeatedly asked Demetrius to ordain him as a priest, but Demetrius continually refused. In around 231, Demetrius sent Origen on a mission to Athens. Along the way, Origen stopped in Caesarea, where he was warmly greeted by the bishops Theoctistus of Caesarea and Alexander of Jerusalem, who had become his close friends during his previous stay. While he was visiting Caesarea, Origen asked Theoctistus to ordain him as a priest. Theoctistus gladly complied. Upon learning of Origen's ordination, Demetrius was outraged and issued a condemnation declaring that Origen's ordination by a foreign bishop was an act of insubordination.

Eusebius reports that as a result of Demetrius's condemnations, Origen decided not to return to Alexandria and instead to take up permanent residence in Caesarea. John Anthony McGuckin, however, argues that Origen had probably already been planning to stay in Caesarea. The Palestinian bishops declared Origen the chief theologian of Caesarea. Firmilian, the bishop of Caesarea Mazaca in Cappadocia, was such a devoted disciple of Origen that he begged him to come to Cappadocia and teach there.

Demetrius raised a storm of protests against the bishops of Palestine and the church synod in Rome. According to Eusebius, Demetrius published the allegation that Origen had secretly castrated himself, a capital offense under Roman law at the time and one which would have made Origen's ordination invalid, since eunuchs were forbidden from becoming priests. Demetrius also alleged that Origen had taught an extreme form of apokatastasis, which held that all beings, including even Satan himself, would eventually attain salvation. This allegation probably arose from a misunderstanding of Origen's argument during a debate with the Valentinian Gnostic teacher Candidus. Candidus had argued in favor of predestination by declaring that the Devil was beyond salvation. Origen had responded by arguing that, if the Devil is destined for eternal damnation, it was on account of his actions, which were the result of his own free will. Therefore, Origen had declared that Satan was only morally reprobate, not absolutely reprobate.

Demetrius died in 232, less than a year after Origen's departure from Alexandria. The accusations against Origen faded with the death of Demetrius, but they did not disappear entirely and they continued to haunt him for the rest of his career. Origen defended himself in his Letter to Friends in Alexandria, in which he vehemently denied that he had ever taught that the Devil would attain salvation and insisted that the very notion of the Devil attaining salvation was simply ludicrous.

=== Work and teaching in Caesarea ===
It was like a spark falling in our deepest soul, setting it on fire, making it burst into flame within us. It was, at the same time, a love for the Holy Word, the most beautiful object of all that, by its ineffable beauty attracts all things to itself with irresistible force, and it was also love for this man, the friend and advocate of the Holy Word. I was thus persuaded to give up all other goals ... I had only one remaining object that I valued and longed for – philosophy, and that divine man who was my master of philosophy.

— Theodore, Panegyric, a first-hand account of what listening to one of Origen's lectures in Caesarea was like

During his early years in Caesarea, Origen's primary task was the establishment of a Christian School; Caesarea had long been seen as a center of learning for Jews and Hellenistic philosophers, but until Origen's arrival, it had lacked a Christian center of higher education. According to Eusebius, the school Origen founded was primarily targeted towards young pagans who had expressed interest in Christianity but were not yet ready to ask for baptism. The school therefore sought to explain Christian teachings through Middle Platonism. Origen started his curriculum by teaching his students classical Socratic reasoning. After they had mastered this, he taught them cosmology and natural history. Finally, once they had mastered all of these subjects, he taught them theology, which was the highest of all philosophies, the accumulation of everything they had previously learned.

With the establishment of the Caesarean school, Origen's reputation as a scholar and theologian reached its zenith and he became known throughout the Mediterranean world as a brilliant intellectual. The hierarchs of the Palestinian and Arabian church synods regarded Origen as the ultimate expert on all matters dealing with theology. While teaching in Caesarea, Origen resumed work on his Commentary on John, composing at least books six through ten. In the first of these books, Origen compares himself to "an Israelite who has escaped the perverse persecution of the Egyptians". Origen also wrote the treatise On Prayer at the request of his friend Ambrose and Tatiana (referred to as the "sister" of Ambrose), in which he analyzes the different types of prayers described in the Bible and offers a detailed exegesis on the Lord's Prayer.

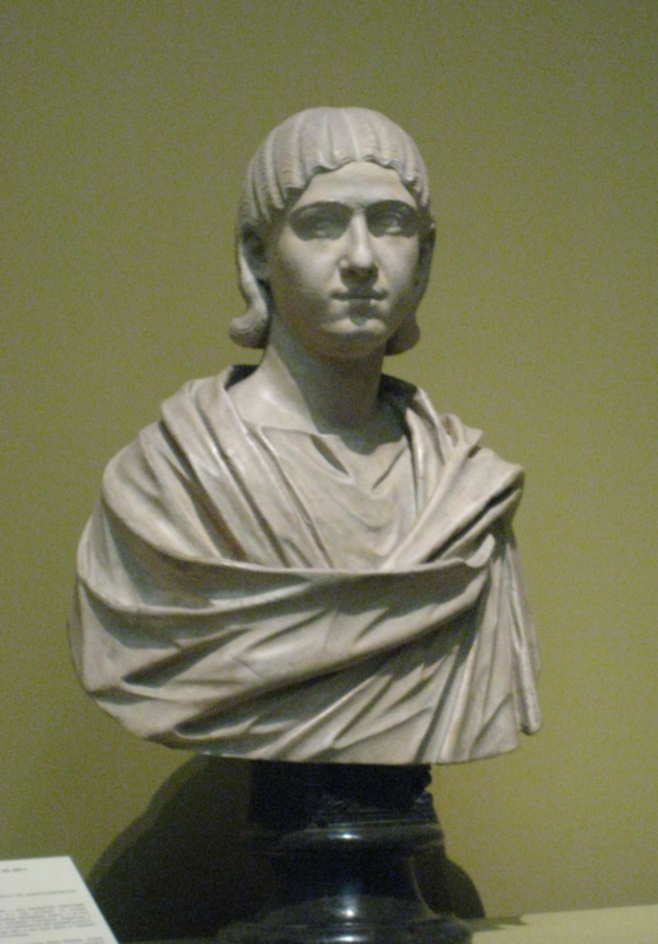
Julia Avita Mamaea, the mother of the Roman emperor Severus Alexander, summoned Origen to Antioch to teach her philosophy.

Pagans also took a fascination with Origen. The Neoplatonist philosopher Porphyry heard of Origen's fame and traveled to Caesarea to listen to his lectures. Porphyry recounts that Origen had extensively studied the teachings of Pythagoras, Plato, and Aristotle, but also those of important Middle Platonists, Neopythagoreans, and Stoics, including Numenius of Apamea, Chronius, Apollophanes, Longinus, Moderatus of Gades, Nicomachus, Chaeremon, and Cornutus. Nonetheless, Porphyry accused Origen of having betrayed true philosophy by subjugating its insights to the exegesis of the Christian scriptures. Eusebius reports that Origen was summoned from Caesarea to Antioch at the behest of Julia Avita Mamaea, the mother of Roman Emperor Severus Alexander, "to discuss Christian philosophy and doctrine with her".

In 235, approximately three years after Origen began teaching in Caesarea, Alexander Severus, who had been tolerant towards Christians, was murdered and Emperor Maximinus Thrax instigated a purge of all those who had supported his predecessor. His pogroms targeted Christian leaders and, in Rome, Pope Pontianus and Hippolytus of Rome were both sent into exile. Origen knew that he was in danger and went into hiding in the home of a faithful Christian woman named Juliana the Virgin, who had been a student of the Ebionite leader Symmachus. Origen's close friend and longtime patron Ambrose was arrested in Nicomedia, and Protoctetes, the leading priest in Caesarea, was also arrested. In their honor, Origen composed his treatise Exhortation to Martyrdom, which is now regarded as one of the greatest classics of Christian resistance literature. After coming out of hiding following Maximinus's death, Origen founded a school of which Gregory Thaumaturgus, later bishop of Pontus, was one of the pupils. He preached regularly on Wednesdays and Fridays, and later daily.

=== Later life ===
Sometime between 238 and 244, Origen visited Athens, where he completed his Commentary on the Book of Ezekiel and began writing his Commentary on the Song of Songs. After visiting Athens, he visited Ambrose in Nicomedia. According to Porphyry, Origen also travelled to Rome or Antioch, where he met Plotinus, the founder of Neoplatonism. The Christians of the eastern Mediterranean continued to revere Origen as the most orthodox of all theologians, and when the Palestinian hierarchs learned that Beryllus, the bishop of Bostra and one of the most energetic Christian leaders of the time, had been preaching adoptionism (the belief that Jesus was born human and only became divine after his baptism), they sent Origen to convert him to orthodoxy. Origen engaged Beryllus in a public disputation, which went so successfully that Beryllus promised only to teach Origen's theology from then on. On another occasion, a Christian leader in Arabia named Heracleides began teaching that the soul was mortal and that it perished with the body. Origen refuted these teachings, arguing that the soul is immortal and can never die.

=== Death ===
In c. 249, the Plague of Cyprian broke out. In 250, Emperor Decius, believing that the plague was caused by Christians' failure to recognise him as divine, issued a decree for Christians to be persecuted. This time Origen did not escape. Eusebius recounts how Origen suffered "bodily tortures and torments under the iron collar and in the dungeon; and how for many days with his feet stretched four spaces in the stocks". The governor of Caesarea gave very specific orders that Origen was not to be killed until he had publicly renounced his faith in Christ. Origen endured two years of imprisonment and torture, but obstinately refused to renounce his faith. In June 251, Decius was killed fighting the Goths in the Battle of Abritus, and Origen was released from prison. Nonetheless, Origen's health was broken by the physical tortures enacted on him, and he died less than a year later at the age of sixty-nine. A later legend, recounted by Jerome and numerous itineraries, places his death and burial at Tyre, but little value can be attached to this.

== Theology ==
Origen significantly contributed to the development of the concept of the Trinity and was among the first to name the Holy Spirit as a member of the Godhead, but he was also a subordinationist, who taught that the Father was superior to the Son and the Son was superior to the Holy Spirit.

Origen's conception of God the Father is apophatic—a perfect unity, invisible and incorporeal, transcending all things material, and therefore inconceivable and incomprehensible. He is likewise unchangeable and transcends space and time. But his power is limited by his goodness, justice, and wisdom; and, though entirely free from necessity, his goodness and omnipotence constrained him to reveal himself. This revelation, the external self-emanation of God, is expressed by Origen in various ways, the Logos being only one of many. The revelation was the first creation of God (cf. Proverbs 8:22), in order to afford creative mediation between God and the world, such mediation being necessary, because God, as changeless unity, could not be the source of a multitudinous creation.

The Logos is the rational creative principle that permeates the universe. The Logos acts on all human beings through their capacity for logic and rational thought, guiding them to the truth of God's revelation. As they progress in their rational thinking, all humans become more like Christ. Nonetheless, they retain their individuality and do not become subsumed into Christ. Creation came into existence only through the Logos, and God's nearest approach to the world is the command to create. While the Logos is substantially a unity, he comprehends a multiplicity of concepts, so that Origen terms him, in Platonic fashion, "essence of essences" and "idea of ideas".

The focused understanding of the Logos, along with the paradigms of participation carried from Greek philosophy, allowed Origen to have a major role in the development of the concept of human deification or theosis. Origen believed that Christ's humanity was deified and this deification spread to all the believers. By participating in the very Logos himself, we become participants in divinity. Origen, however, concluded that only those who are created in God's image and live a life of virtue can be deified; virtue for Origen is linked to the person of Jesus Christ. Thus, he excluded all inanimate objects or animals (previously seen as divine in some pagan polytheistic systems), and also excluded the pagan heroes from this perceived deification.

Origen significantly contributed to the development of the idea of the Trinity. He declared the Holy Spirit to be a part of the Godhead and interpreted the Parable of the Lost Coin to mean that the Holy Spirit dwells within each and every person and that the inspiration of the Holy Spirit was necessary for any kind of speech dealing with God. Origen taught that the activity of all three parts of the Trinity was necessary for a person to attain salvation.

In one fragment preserved by Rufinus in his Latin translation of Pamphilus's Defense of Origen, Origen seems to apply the phrase homooúsios (ὁμοούσιος 'of the same substance') to the relationship between the Father and the Son. But Williams states that it is impossible to verify whether the quote that uses the word homoousios really comes from Pamphilus at all, let alone Origen.

In other passages, Origen rejected the belief that the Son and the Father were one hypostasis as heretical. According to Rowan Williams, because the words ousia and hypostasis were used synonymously in Origen's time, Origen almost certainly would have rejected homoousios, as a description for the relationship between the Father and the Son, as heretical.

Nonetheless, Origen was a subordinationist, meaning he believed that the Father was superior to the Son and the Son was superior to the Holy Spirit, a model based on Platonic proportions. Jerome records that Origen had written that God the Father is invisible to all beings, including even the Son and the Holy Spirit, and that the Son is invisible to the Holy Spirit as well. At one point Origen suggests that the Son was created by the Father and that the Holy Spirit was created by the Son, but, at another point, he writes that: "Up to the present I have been able to find no passage in the Scriptures that the Holy Spirit is a created being." At the time when Origen was alive, orthodox views on the Trinity had not yet been formulated and subordinationism was not yet considered heretical. In fact, virtually all orthodox theologians prior to the Arian controversy in the latter half of the fourth century were subordinationists to some extent. Origen's subordinationism may have developed out of his efforts to defend the unity of God against the Gnostics.

=== Christology ===
Origen writes that Jesus was "the firstborn of all creation [who] assumed a body and a human soul". He firmly believed that Jesus had a human soul and abhorred docetism (the teaching which held that Jesus had come to Earth in spirit form rather than a physical human body). Origen envisioned Jesus' human nature as the one soul that stayed closest to God and remained perfectly faithful to Him, even when all other souls fell away. At Jesus's incarnation, his soul became fused with the Logos and they "intermingled" to become one. Thus, according to Origen, Christ was both human and divine, but like all human souls, Christ's human nature was existent from the beginning.

Origen was the first to propose the ransom theory of atonement in its fully developed form, although Irenaeus had previously proposed a prototypical form of it. According to this theory, Christ's death on the cross was a ransom to Satan in exchange for humanity's liberation. This theory holds that Satan was tricked by God because Christ was not only free of sin, but also the incarnate Deity, whom Satan lacked the ability to enslave. The theory was later expanded by theologians such as Gregory of Nyssa and Rufinus of Aquileia. In the eleventh century, Anselm of Canterbury criticized the ransom theory, along with the associated Christus Victor theory, resulting in the theory's decline in western Europe. The theory has nonetheless retained some of its popularity in the Eastern Orthodox Church.

=== Cosmology and eschatology ===
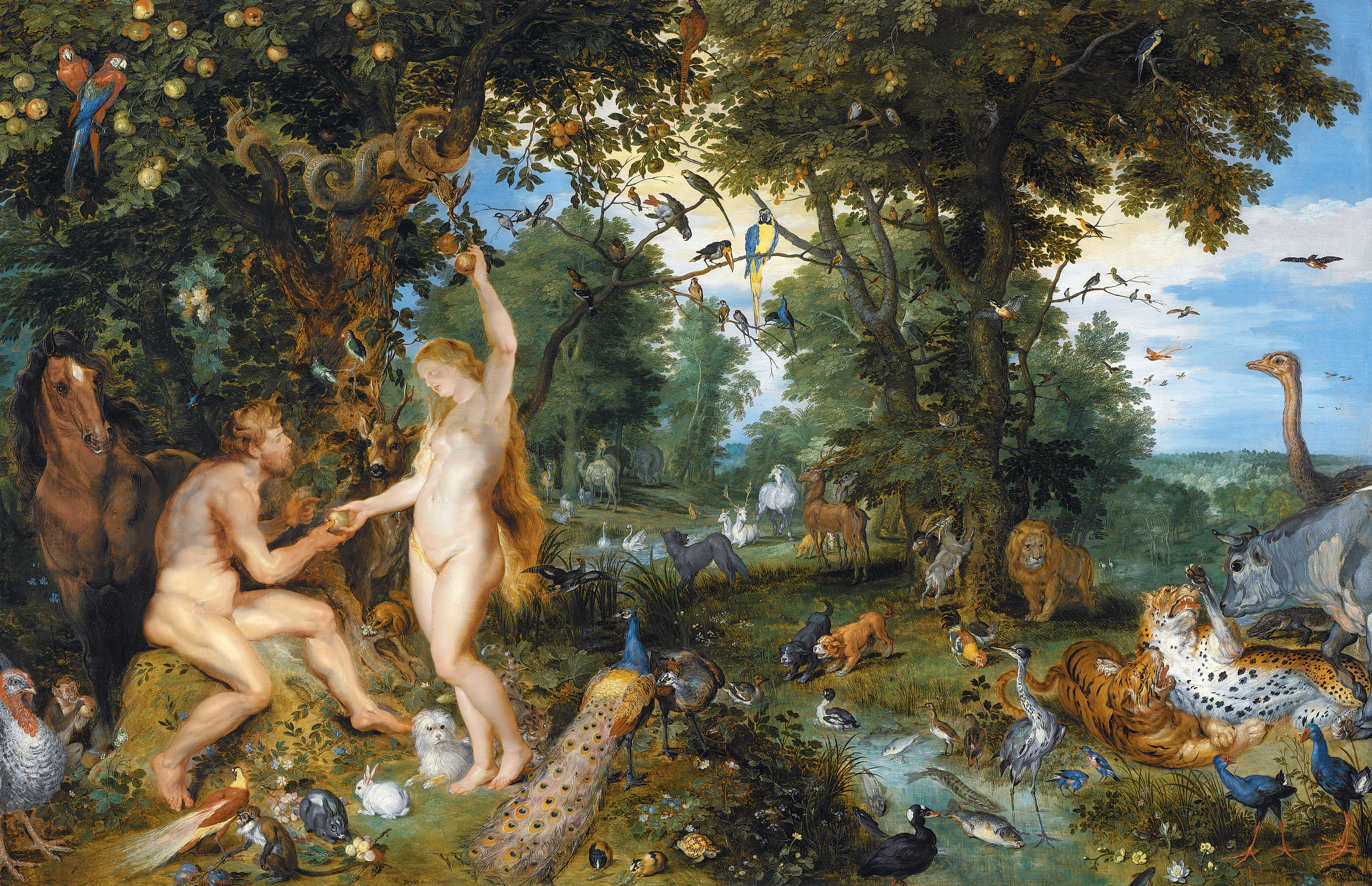
The Garden of Eden with the Fall of Man (c. 1617) by Peter Paul Rubens and Jan Brueghel the Elder. Origen based his teaching of the preexistence of souls on an allegorical interpretation of the creation story in the Book of Genesis.

One of Origen's main teachings was the doctrine of the preexistence of souls, which held that before God created the material world he created a vast number of incorporeal "spiritual intelligences" (ψυχαί psychaí). All of these souls were at first devoted to the contemplation and love of their Creator, but as the fervor of the divine fire cooled, almost all of these intelligences eventually grew bored of contemplating God, and their love for him "cooled off" (ψύχεσθαι psýchesthai). When God created the world, the souls which had previously existed without bodies became incarnate. Those whose love for God diminished the most became demons. Those whose love diminished moderately became human souls, eventually to be incarnated in fleshly bodies. Those whose love diminished the least became angels.

One soul, however, who remained perfectly devoted to God became, through love, one with the Word (Logos) of God. The Logos eventually took flesh and was born of the Virgin Mary, becoming the God-man Jesus Christ. In recent years it has been questioned whether Origen believed this, being in reality a belief of his disciples and a misrepresentation by Justinian, Epiphanius and others.

Origen believed that, eventually, the whole world would be converted to Christianity, "since the world is continually gaining possession of more souls". He believed that the Kingdom of Heaven was not yet come, but that it was the duty of every Christian to make the eschatological reality of the kingdom present in their lives. Origen is often believed to be a Universalist, who suggested that all people might eventually attain salvation, but only after being purged of their sins through "divine fire". This, of course, in line of Origen's allegorical interpretation, was not literal fire, but rather the inner anguish of knowing one's own sins.

Origen was careful to maintain that universal salvation was merely a possibility and not a definitive doctrine, though he seemed strongly convinced that at least all human souls will be reunited to God in a final apokatastasis – the re-establishment of an original unity in creation – "because the end is always like the beginning" and because he believed all divine punishment to be medicinal. It is certain that Origen rejected the Stoic doctrine of eternal return, although he did posit the existence of a series of non-identical worlds. Jerome quotes Origen as having allegedly written that "after aeons and the one restoration of all things, the state of Gabriel will be the same as that of the Devil, Paul's as that of Caiaphas, that of virgins as that of prostitutes". However, Origen expressly states in his Letter to Friends in Alexandria that Satan and "those who are cast out of the kingdom of God" would not be included in the final salvation. Moreover, Origen often described a quite traditional fiery punishment in his homilies, considering the doctrine vital for the Christians who are not yet spiritually mature. On the other hand, he thought it sometimes necessary to admit the medicinal character of divine punishment to refute the notion of a cruel God.

The Letter to Friends may not reflect his actual eschatological views, as in some of his works he suggests that eternal punishment is not true but should nonetheless be taught as true to the majority of people in order to discourage sinning. For instance, in Book 6, Chapter 26 of Against Celsus, he states,

It is in the precincts of Jerusalem that punishment will be inflicted upon those who undergo the process of purification [...] But the remarks which might be made on this topic are neither to be made to all, nor to be uttered on the present occasion; for it is not unattended with danger to commit to writing the explanation of such subjects, seeing the multitude need no further instruction than that which relates to the punishment of sinners; while to ascend beyond this is not expedient, for the sake of those who are with difficulty restrained, even by fear of eternal punishment, from plunging into any degree of wickedness, and into the flood of evils which result from sin.

A number of critics in the patristic era accused Origen of teaching that even the resurrection bodies would eventually vanish so that the souls could be united with the incorporeal God. In Rufinus's favourable translation of On the First Principles, however, Origen repeatedly asserts that some kind of body is indispensable for created beings, although when contemplating the final end of all things, he offers three hypotheses – incorporeal existence, ethereal corporeality, or corporeality coming to rest in a stable part of the universe – leaving the reader to judge whichever is best. Nevertheless, based on other passages from his works, he probably preferred the third one. He seems to have believed that even the not yet resurrected souls of the departed possess bodies, albeit luminous ones, which explains ghost sightings. In discussing the resurrection bodies, he stressed Paul's teaching about the spiritual body. Origen emphasized its vast superiority and difference from the current body to the point of arguing that it will lack teeth and other no longer needed parts. However, he insisted that our individual bodies will be recognizable thanks to a unique form (εἶδος), preserved by each of our immortal souls, that shapes and integrates each body.

Origen explicitly rejected "the false doctrine of the transmigration of souls into bodies". But this may refer only to a specific kind of transmigration according to theologian Geddes MacGregor, who has argued that Origen must have believed in the Platonic teaching of metempsychosis ('transmigration of souls'; i.e. reincarnation) because it makes sense within his eschatology and is never explicitly denied in the Bible. Roger E. Olson, however, dismisses the view that Origen believed in reincarnation as a New Age misunderstanding of Origen's teachings.

=== Ethics ===
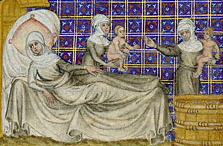
The Birth of Esau and Jacob (c. 1360–1370) by Master of Jean de Mandeville. Origen used the Biblical story of Esau and Jacob to support his theory that a soul's free will actions committed before incarnation determine the conditions of the person's birth.

Origen was an ardent believer in free will, and he adamantly rejected the Valentinian idea of election. Instead, Origen believed that even disembodied souls have the power to make their own decisions. Furthermore, in his interpretation of the story of Jacob and Esau, Origen argues that the superficial unfairness of a person's condition at birth—with some humans being poor, others rich, some being sick, and others healthy—is a by-product of what the person's soul had done in the pre-existent state. Origen defends free will in his interpretations of instances of divine foreknowledge in the scriptures, arguing that Jesus's knowledge of Judas's future betrayal in the gospels and God's knowledge of Israel's future disobedience in the Deuteronomistic history only show that God knew these events would happen in advance. Origen therefore concludes that the individuals involved in these incidents still made their decisions out of their own free will. Like Plato, Plotinus and Gregory of Nyssa, Origen understands that only the agent who chooses the Good is free; choosing evil is never free but slavery.

Origen was an ardent pacifist, and in his Against Celsus, he argued that Christianity's inherent pacifism was one of the most outwardly noticeable aspects of the religion. While Origen did admit that some Christians served in the Roman army, he pointed out that most did not and insisted that engaging in earthly wars was against the way of Christ. Origen accepted that it was sometimes necessary for a non-Christian state to wage wars but insisted that it was impossible for a Christian to fight in such a war without compromising his or her faith, since Christ had absolutely forbidden violence of any kind. Origen explained the violence found in certain passages of the Old Testament as allegorical and pointed out Old Testament passages which he interpreted as supporting nonviolence, such as Psalm 7 and Lamentations 3. Origen maintained that, if everyone were peaceful like Christians, there would be no war.

=== Hermeneutics ===
For who that has understanding will suppose that the first, and second, and third day, and the evening and the morning, existed without a sun, and moon, and stars? And that the first day was, as it were, also without a sky? And who is so foolish as to suppose that God, after the manner of a husbandman, planted a paradise in Eden, towards the east, and placed in it a tree of life, visible and palpable, so that one tasting of the fruit by the bodily teeth obtained life? And again, that one was a partaker of good and evil by masticating what was taken from the tree? And if God is said to walk in the paradise in the evening, and Adam to hide himself under a tree, I do not suppose that anyone doubts that these things figuratively indicate certain mysteries, the history having taken place in appearance, and not literally.

— Origen, On the First Principles IV.16

Origen bases his theology on the Christian scriptures and does not appeal to Platonic teachings without having first supported his argument with a scriptural basis. He saw the scriptures as divinely inspired and was cautious never to contradict his own interpretation of what was written in them. Nonetheless, Origen did have a penchant for speculating beyond what was explicitly stated in the Bible, and this habit frequently placed him in the hazy realm between strict orthodoxy and heresy.

According to Origen, there are two kinds of Biblical literature which are found in both the Old and New Testaments: historia ('history' or 'narrative') and nomothesia ('legislation' or 'ethical prescription'). Origen expressly states that the Old and New Testaments should be read together and according to the same rules. Origen further taught that there were three different ways in which passages of scripture could be interpreted. The "flesh" was the literal, historical interpretation of the passage; the "soul" was the moral message behind the passage; and the "spirit" was the eternal, incorporeal reality that the passage conveyed. In Origen's exegesis, the Book of Proverbs, Ecclesiastes, and the Song of Songs represent perfect examples of the bodily, soulful, and spiritual components of scripture respectively.

Origen saw the "spiritual" interpretation as the deepest and most important meaning of the text and taught that some passages held no literal meaning at all and that their meanings were purely allegorical. Nonetheless, he stressed that "the passages which are historically true are far more numerous than those which are composed with purely spiritual meanings" and often used examples from corporeal realities. Origen noticed that the accounts of Jesus's life in the four canonical gospels contain irreconcilable contradictions, but he argued that these contradictions did not undermine the spiritual meanings of the passages in question. Origen's idea of a twofold creation was based on an allegorical interpretation of the creation story found in the first two chapters of the Book of Genesis.

=== Transmission of knowledge ===
Origen cites Hermippus of Smyrna to argue that Pythagoras owed a debt to Judaism.

== Legacy ==
=== Influence on the later church ===
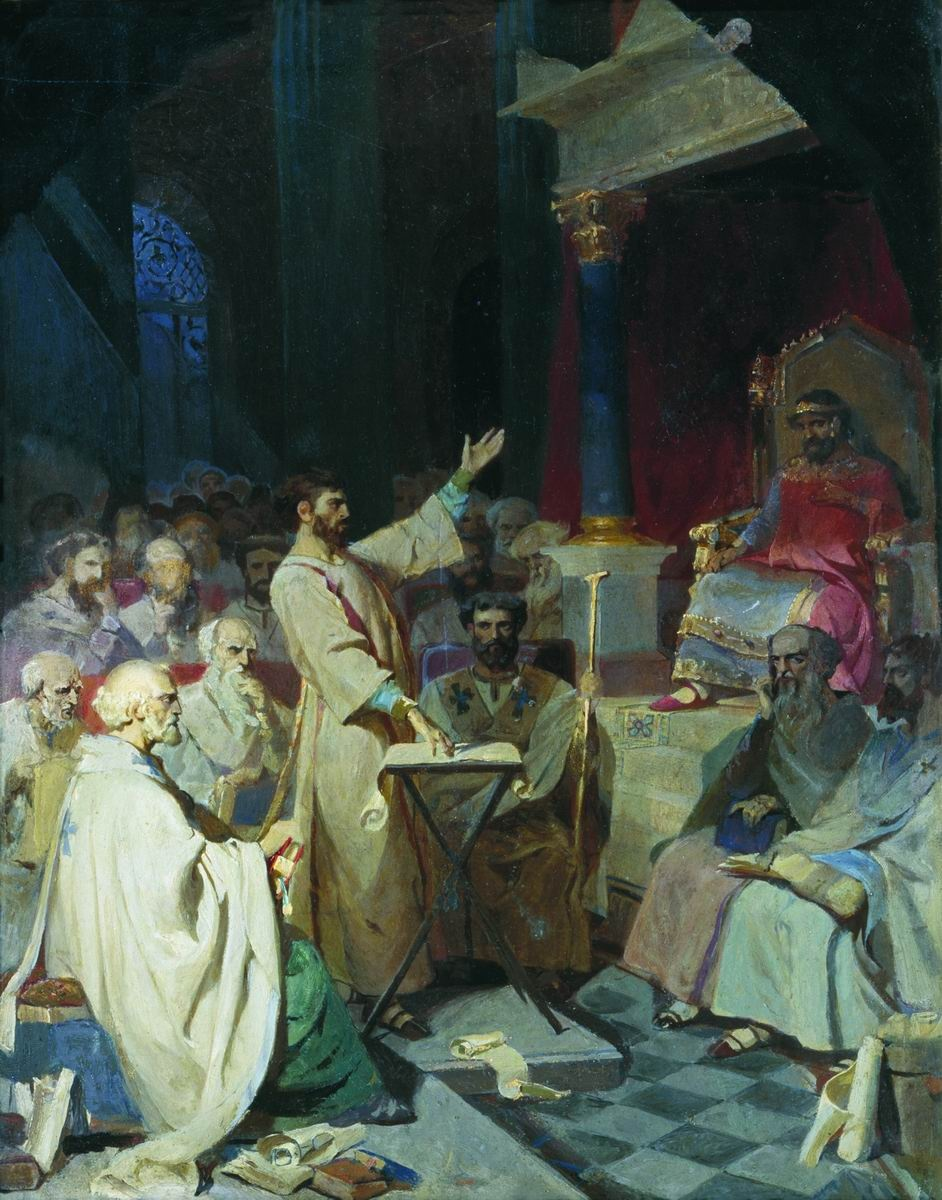
Athanasius of Alexandria, shown standing in this 1876 oil painting by Vasily Surikov, was deeply influenced by Origen's teachings.

==== Before the Crises ====
Origen is often seen as the first major Christian theologian. Though his orthodoxy had been questioned in Alexandria while he was alive, after Origen's death Pope Dionysius of Alexandria became one of the foremost proponents of Origen's theology. Every Christian theologian who came after him was influenced by his theology, whether directly or indirectly. Origen's contributions to theology were so vast and complex, however, that his followers frequently emphasized drastically different parts of his teachings to the expense of other parts. Dionysius emphasized Origen's subordinationist views, which led Dionysius to deny the unity of the Trinity, causing controversy throughout North Africa. At the same time, Origen's other disciple Theognostus of Alexandria taught that the Father and the Son were "of one substance".

For centuries after his death, Origen was regarded as the bastion of orthodoxy, and his philosophy practically defined Eastern Christianity. Origen was revered as one of the greatest of all Christian teachers; he was especially beloved by monks, who saw themselves as continuing in Origen's ascetic legacy. As time progressed, however, Origen became criticized under the standard of orthodoxy in later eras, rather than the standards of his own lifetime. In the early fourth century, the Christian writer Methodius of Olympus criticized some of Origen's more speculative arguments but otherwise agreed with Origen on all other points of theology. Peter of Antioch and Eustathius of Antioch criticized Origen as heretical.

Both orthodox and heterodox theologians claimed to be following in the tradition Origen had established. Athanasius of Alexandria, the most prominent supporter of the Holy Trinity at the First Council of Nicaea, was deeply influenced by Origen, and so were Basil of Caesarea, Gregory of Nyssa, and Gregory of Nazianzus (the "Cappadocian Fathers"). At the same time, Origen deeply influenced Arius of Alexandria and later followers of Arianism. Although the extent of the relationship between the two is debated, in antiquity, many orthodox Christians believed that Origen was the true and ultimate source of the Arian heresy.

==== First Origenist Crisis ====
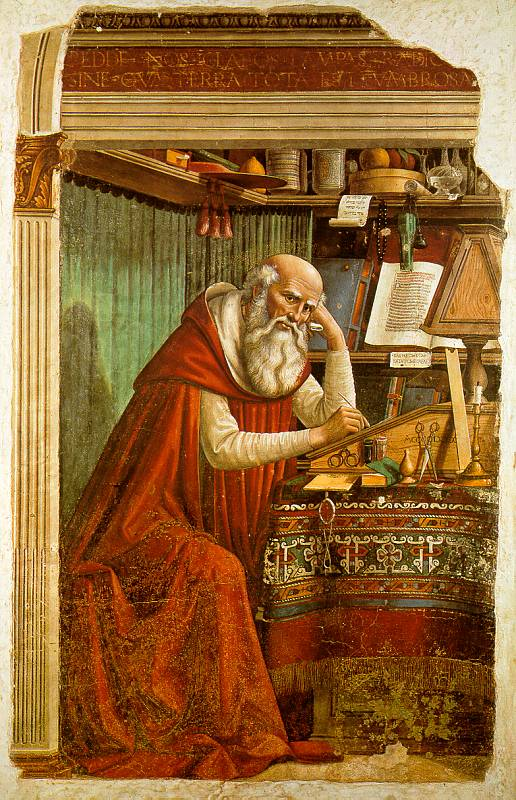
St. Jerome in His Study (1480), by Domenico Ghirlandaio. Although initially a student of Origen's teachings, Jerome turned against him during the First Origenist Crisis. He nonetheless remained influenced by Origen's teachings for his entire life.

The First Origenist Crisis began in the late fourth century, coinciding with the beginning of monasticism in Palestine. The first stirring of the controversy came from the Cyprian bishop Epiphanius of Salamis, who was determined to root out all heresies and refute them. Epiphanius attacked Origen in his anti-heretical treatises Ancoratus (375) and Panarion (376), compiling a list of teachings Origen had espoused that Epiphanius regarded as heretical. Epiphanius's treatises portray Origen as an originally orthodox Christian who had been corrupted and turned into a heretic by the evils of "Greek education". Epiphanius particularly objected to Origen's subordinationism, his "excessive" use of allegorical hermeneutic, and his habit of proposing ideas about the Bible "speculatively, as exercises" rather than "dogmatically".

Epiphanius asked John, the bishop of Jerusalem, to condemn Origen as a heretic. John refused on the grounds that a person could not be retroactively condemned as a heretic after that person had already died. In 393, a monk named Atarbius advanced a petition to have Origen and his writings censured. Tyrannius Rufinus, a priest at the monastery on the Mount of Olives who had been ordained by John of Jerusalem and was a longtime admirer of Origen, rejected the petition outright. Rufinus's close friend and associate Jerome, who had also studied Origen, however, came to agree with the petition. Around the same time, John Cassian, an Eastern monk, introduced Origen's teachings to the West.

In 394, Epiphanius wrote to John of Jerusalem, again asking for Origen to be condemned, insisting that Origen's writings denigrated human sexual reproduction and accusing him of having been an Encratite. John once again denied this request. By 395, Jerome had allied himself with the anti-Origenists and begged John of Jerusalem to condemn Origen, a plea which John once again refused. Epiphanius launched a campaign against John, openly preaching that John was an Origenist deviant. He successfully persuaded Jerome to break communion with John and ordained Jerome's brother Paulinianus as a priest in defiance of John's authority.

In 397, Rufinus published a Latin translation of Origen's On First Principles. Rufinus was convinced that Origen's original treatise had been interpolated by heretics and that these interpolations were the source of the heterodox teachings found in it. He therefore heavily modified Origen's text, omitting and altering any parts which disagreed with contemporary Christian orthodoxy. In the introduction to this translation, Rufinus mentioned that Jerome had studied under Origen's disciple Didymus the Blind, implying that Jerome was a follower of Origen. Jerome was so incensed by this that he resolved to produce his own Latin translation of On the First Principles, in which he promised to translate every word exactly as it was written and lay bare Origen's heresies to the whole world. Jerome's translation has been lost in its entirety.

In 399, the Origenist crisis reached Egypt. Pope Theophilus I of Alexandria was sympathetic to the supporters of Origen and the church historian, Sozomen, records that he had openly preached the Origenist teaching that God was incorporeal. In his Festal Letter of 399, he denounced those who believed that God had a literal, human-like body, calling them illiterate "simple ones". A large mob of Alexandrian monks who regarded God as anthropomorphic rioted in the streets. According to the church historian Socrates Scholasticus, in order to prevent a riot, Theophilus made a sudden about-face and began denouncing Origen. In 400, Theophilus summoned a council in Alexandria, which condemned Origen and all his followers as heretics for having taught that God was incorporeal, which they decreed contradicted the only true and orthodox position, which was that God had a literal, physical body resembling that of a human. (Note: Socrates Scholasticus describes this condemnation as a deception to gain the confidence of the Alexandrian monastic community, which vehemently upheld the teaching of an anthropomorphic Deity.)

Theophilus labeled Origen as the "hydra of all heresies" and persuaded Pope Anastasius I to sign the letter of the council, which primarily denounced the teachings of the Nitrian monks associated with Evagrius Ponticus. In 402, Theophilus expelled Origenist monks from Egyptian monasteries and banished the four monks known as the "Tall Brothers", who were leaders of the Nitrian community. John Chrysostom, the patriarch of Constantinople, granted the Tall Brothers asylum, a fact which Theophilus used to orchestrate John's condemnation and removal from his position at the Synod of the Oak in July 403. Once John Chrysostom had been deposed, Theophilus restored normal relations with the Origenist monks in Egypt and the first Origenist crisis came to an end.

==== Second Origenist Crisis ====
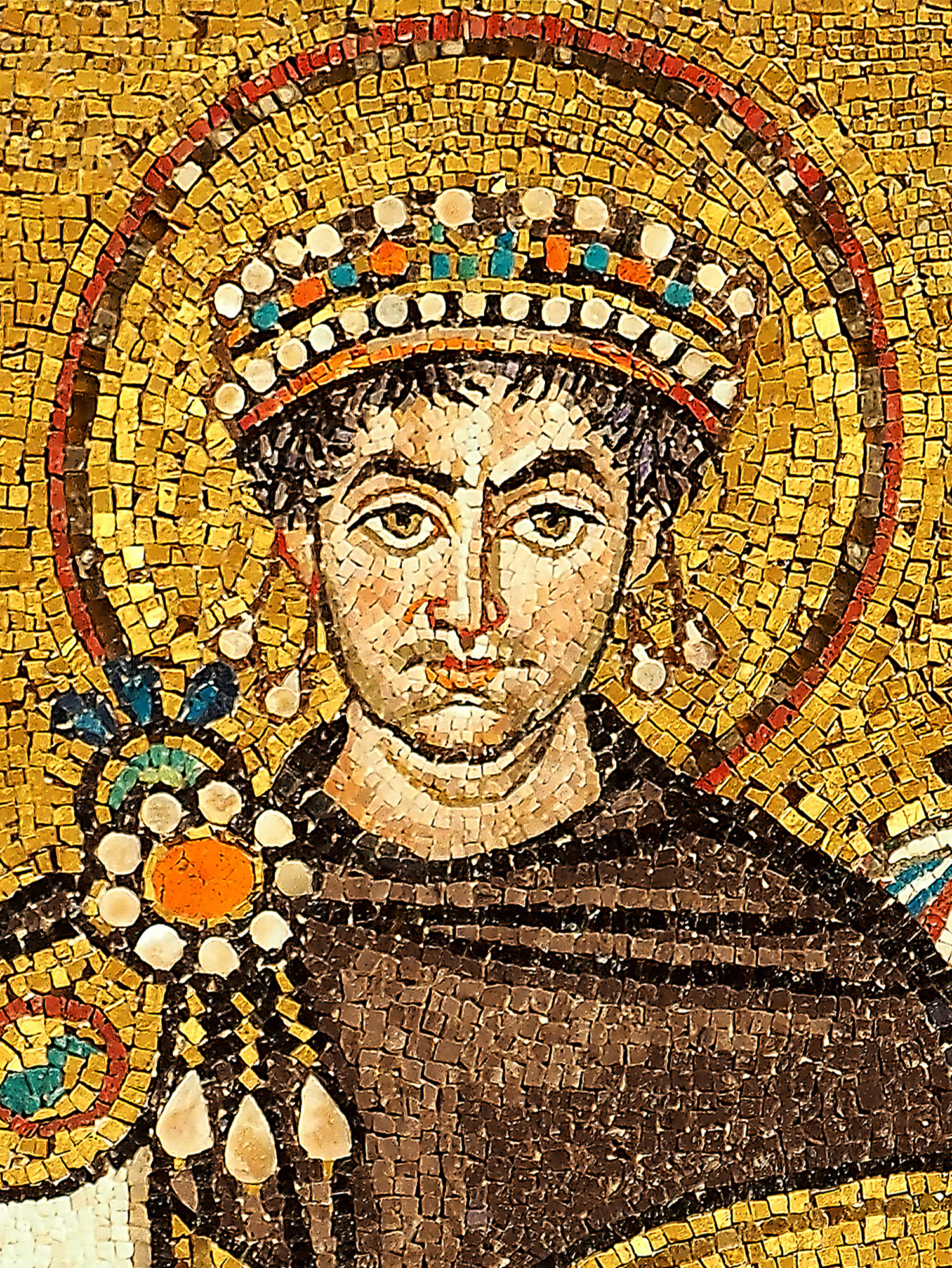
Emperor Justinian I, shown here in a contemporary mosaic portrait from Ravenna, denounced Origen as a heretic and ordered all of his writings to be burned.

The Second Origenist Crisis occurred in the sixth century, during the height of Byzantine monasticism. Although the Second Origenist Crisis is not nearly as well documented as the first, it seems to have primarily concerned the teachings of Origen's later followers, rather than what Origen had written. Origen's disciple Evagrius Ponticus had advocated contemplative, noetic prayer, but other monastic communities prioritized asceticism in prayer, emphasizing fasting, labors, and vigils.

Some Origenist monks in Palestine, referred to by their enemies as "Isochristoi" (meaning 'those who would assume equality with Christ'), emphasized Origen's teaching of the pre-existence of souls and held that all souls were originally equal to Christ's and would become equal again at the end of time. Another faction of Origenists in the same region instead insisted that Christ was the "leader of many brethren", as the first-created being. This faction was more moderate, and they were referred to by their opponents as "Protoktistoi" ('[those] first created'). Both factions accused the other of heresy, and other Christians accused both of them of heresy.

The Protoktistoi appealed to the Emperor Justinian I to condemn the Isochristoi of heresy through Pelagius, the papal apocrisarius. In 543, Pelagius presented Justinian with documents, including a letter denouncing Origen written by Patriarch Mennas of Constantinople, along with excerpts from Origen's On First Principles and several anathemata against Origen. A domestic synod convened to address the issue concluded that the Isochristoi's teachings were heretical and, seeing Origen as the ultimate culprit behind the heresy, denounced Origen as a heretic as well. Emperor Justinian ordered for all of Origen's writings to be burned. In the west, the Decretum Gelasianum, which was written sometime between 519 and 553, listed Origen as an author whose writings were to be categorically banned.

In 553, during the early days of the Second Council of Constantinople (the Fifth Ecumenical Council), when Pope Vigilius was still refusing to take part in it despite Justinian holding him hostage, the bishops at the council ratified an open letter which condemned Origen as the leader of the Isochristoi. The letter was not part of the official acts of the council, and it more or less repeated the edict issued by the Synod of Constantinople in 543. It cites objectionable writings attributed to Origen, but all the writings referred to in it were actually written by Evagrius Ponticus. After the council officially opened, but while Pope Vigillius was still refusing to take part, Justinian presented the bishops with the problem of a text known as The Three Chapters, which attacked the Antiochene Christology.

The bishops drew up a list of anathemata against the heretical teachings contained within The Three Chapters and those associated with them. In the official text of the eleventh anathema, Origen is condemned as a Christological heretic, but Origen's name does not appear at all in the Homonoia, the first draft of the anathemata issued by the imperial chancery, nor does it appear in the version of the conciliar proceedings that was eventually signed by Pope Vigillius, a long time afterwards. Norman P. Tanner's edition of the Decrees of the Ecumenical Councils (Georgetown University Press, 1990) says: "Our edition does not include the text of the anathemas against Origen since recent studies have shown that these anathemas cannot be attributed to this council." These discrepancies may indicate that Origen's name was retrospectively inserted into the text after the council.

Some authorities believe these anathemata belong to an earlier local synod. Even if Origen's name did appear in the original text of the anathema, the teachings attributed to Origen that are condemned in the anathema were actually the ideas of later Origenists, which had very little grounding in anything Origen had actually written. Popes Vigilius, Pelagius I, Pelagius II, and Gregory the Great were only aware that the Fifth Council specifically dealt with The Three Chapters and make no mention of Origenism or universalism, nor spoke as if they knew of its condemnation—even though Gregory the Great was opposed to universalism.

==== After the anathemas ====
If orthodoxy were a matter of intention, no theologian could be more orthodox than Origen, none more devoted to the cause of the Christian faith.

— Henry Chadwick, scholar of early Christianity, in the Encyclopædia Britannica

As a direct result of the numerous condemnations of his work, only a tiny fraction of Origen's voluminous writings have survived. Nonetheless, these writings still amount to a massive number of Greek and Latin texts, very few of which have yet been translated into English. Many more writings have survived in fragments through quotations from later Church Fathers. Even in the late 14th century, Francesc Eiximenis in his Llibre de les dones, produced otherwise unknown quotations from Origen, which may be evidence of other works surviving into the Late Medieval period.

It is likely that the writings containing Origen's most unusual and speculative ideas have been lost to time, making it nearly impossible to determine whether Origen actually held the heretical views which the anathemas against him ascribed to him. Nonetheless, in spite of the decrees against Origen, the church remained enamored of him and he remained a central figure of Christian theology throughout the first millennium. He continued to be revered as the founder of Biblical exegesis, and anyone in the first millennium who took the interpretation of the scriptures seriously would have had knowledge of Origen's teachings.

Origen the Scholar
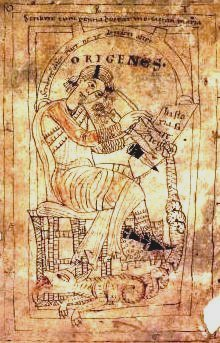
- Born: c. 185
- Died: c. 253
- Venerated in: Evangelical Church in Germany
- Feast: April 27
- Attributes: Self-castration, monastic habit
- Controversy: Lack of formal canonization, accusations of heresy

Jerome's Latin translations of Origen's homilies were widely read in western Europe throughout the Middle Ages, and Origen's teachings greatly influenced those of the Byzantine monk Maximus the Confessor and the Irish theologian John Scotus Eriugena. Since the Renaissance, the debate over Origen's orthodoxy has continued to rage. Basilios Bessarion, a Greek refugee who fled to Italy after the Fall of Constantinople in 1453, produced a Latin translation of Origen's Against Celsus, which was printed in 1481. Major controversy erupted in 1487, after the Italian humanist scholar Giovanni Pico della Mirandola issued a thesis arguing that "it is more reasonable to believe that Origen was saved than he was damned". A papal commission condemned Pico's position on account of the anathemas against Origen, but not until after the debate had received considerable attention.

The most prominent advocate of Origen during the Renaissance was the Dutch humanist scholar Desiderius Erasmus, who regarded Origen as the greatest of all Christian authors and wrote in a letter to John Eck that he learned more about Christian philosophy from a single page of Origen than from ten pages of Augustine. Erasmus especially admired Origen for his lack of rhetorical flourishes, which were so common in the writings of other Patristic authors. Erasmus borrowed heavily from Origen's defense of free will in On First Principles in his 1524 treatise On Free Will, now considered his most important theological work.

In 1527, Erasmus translated and published the portion of Origen's Commentary on the Gospel of Matthew that survived only in Greek and in 1536, he published the most complete edition of Origen's writings that had ever been published at that time. While Origen's emphasis on the human effort in attaining salvation appealed to the Renaissance humanists, it made him far less appealing to the proponents of the Reformation.

Martin Luther deplored Origen's understanding of salvation as irredeemably defective and declared "in all of Origen there is not one word about Christ". Consequently, he ordered for Origen's writings to be banned. Nonetheless, the earlier Czech reformer Jan Hus had taken inspiration from Origen for his view that the church is a spiritual reality rather than an official hierarchy, and Luther's contemporary, the Swiss reformer Huldrych Zwingli, took inspiration from Origen for his interpretation of the Eucharist as symbolic.

In the seventeenth century, the English Cambridge Platonist Henry More was a devoted Origenist, and although he did reject the notion of universal salvation, he accepted most of Origen's other teachings. Pope Benedict XVI expressed admiration for Origen, describing him in a sermon as part of a series on the Church Fathers as "a figure crucial to the whole development of Christian thought", "a true 'maestro'", and "not only a brilliant theologian but also an exemplary witness of the doctrine he passed on". He concludes the sermon by inviting his audience to "welcome into your hearts the teaching of this great master of the faith". Modern Protestant evangelicals admire Origen for his passionate devotion to the scriptures but are frequently baffled or even appalled by his allegorical interpretation of them, which many believe ignores the literal, historical truth behind them.

Origen is often noted for being one of the few Church Fathers who is not generally regarded as a saint. Nevertheless, there are notable individuals who referred to Origen as St. Origen. This includes Anglicans such as Edward Welchman, John Howson and Sir Winston Churchill; Calvinists such as Pierre Bayle, Georges-Louis Liomin and Heinrich Bullinger; American scholar and Orthodox Christian David Bentley Hart;. The Evangelical Church in Germany officially commemorates Origen with a designated feast day on April 27.

== Works ==
=== Exegetical writings ===
Origen was an extremely prolific writer. According to Epiphanius, he wrote a grand total of roughly 6,000 works over the course of his lifetime. Most scholars agree that this estimate is probably somewhat exaggerated. According to Jerome, Eusebius listed the titles of just under 2,000 treatises written by Origen in his lost Life of Pamphilus. Jerome compiled an abbreviated list of Origen's major treatises, itemizing 800 different titles.

By far the most important work of Origen on textual criticism was the Hexapla ('Sixfold'), a massive comparative study of various translations of the Old Testament in six columns: Hebrew, Hebrew in Greek characters, the Septuagint, and the Greek translations of Theodotion (a Jewish scholar from c. 180 AD), Aquila of Sinope (another Jewish scholar from c. 117–138), and Symmachus (an Ebionite scholar from c. 193–211). Origen was the first Christian scholar to introduce critical markers to a Biblical text. He marked the Septuagint column of the Hexapla using signs adapted from those used by the textual critics of the Great Library of Alexandria: a passage found in the Septuagint that was not found in the Hebrew text would be marked with an obelus (÷) and a passage that was found in other Greek translations, but not in the Septuagint, would be marked with an asterisk (*).

Diagram showing the inter-relationship between various significant ancient versions and recensions of the Old Testament (some identified by their siglum). LXX here denotes the original septuagint.

The Hexapla was the cornerstone of the Great Library of Caesarea, which Origen founded. It was still the centerpiece of the library's collection by the time of Jerome, who records having used it in his letters on multiple occasions. When Emperor Constantine the Great ordered fifty complete copies of the Bible to be transcribed and disseminated across the empire, Eusebius used the Hexapla as the master copy for the Old Testament. Although the original Hexapla has been lost, the text of it has survived in numerous fragments and a more-or-less complete Syriac translation of the Greek column, made by the seventh-century bishop Paul of Tella, has also survived. For some sections of the Hexapla, Origen included additional columns containing other Greek translations; for the Book of Psalms, he included no less than eight Greek translations, making this section known as Enneapla ('Ninefold'). Origen also produced the Tetrapla ('Fourfold'), a smaller, abridged version of the Hexapla containing only the four Greek translations and not the original Hebrew text.

According to Jerome's Epistle 33, Origen wrote extensive scholia on the books of Exodus, Leviticus, Isaiah, Psalms 1–15, Ecclesiastes, and the Gospel of John. None of these scholia have survived intact, but parts of them were incorporated into the Catenaea, a collection of excerpts from major works of Biblical commentary written by the Church Fathers. Other fragments of the scholia are preserved in Origen's Philocalia and in Pamphilus of Caesarea's apology for Origen. The Stromateis were of a similar character, and the margin of Codex Athous Laura, 184, contains citations from this work on Romans 9:23; I Corinthians 6:14, 7:31, 34, 9:20–21, 10:9, besides a few other fragments. Origen composed homilies covering almost the entire Bible. There are 205, and possibly 279, homilies of Origen that are extant either in Greek or in Latin translations. (Note: The discrepancy concerns the 74 homilies on the Psalms attributed to Jerome, but which V Peri has argued Jerome translated from Origen with only minor changes. (Both 205 and 279 exclude the 2012 discoveries) Heine 2004, p. 124)

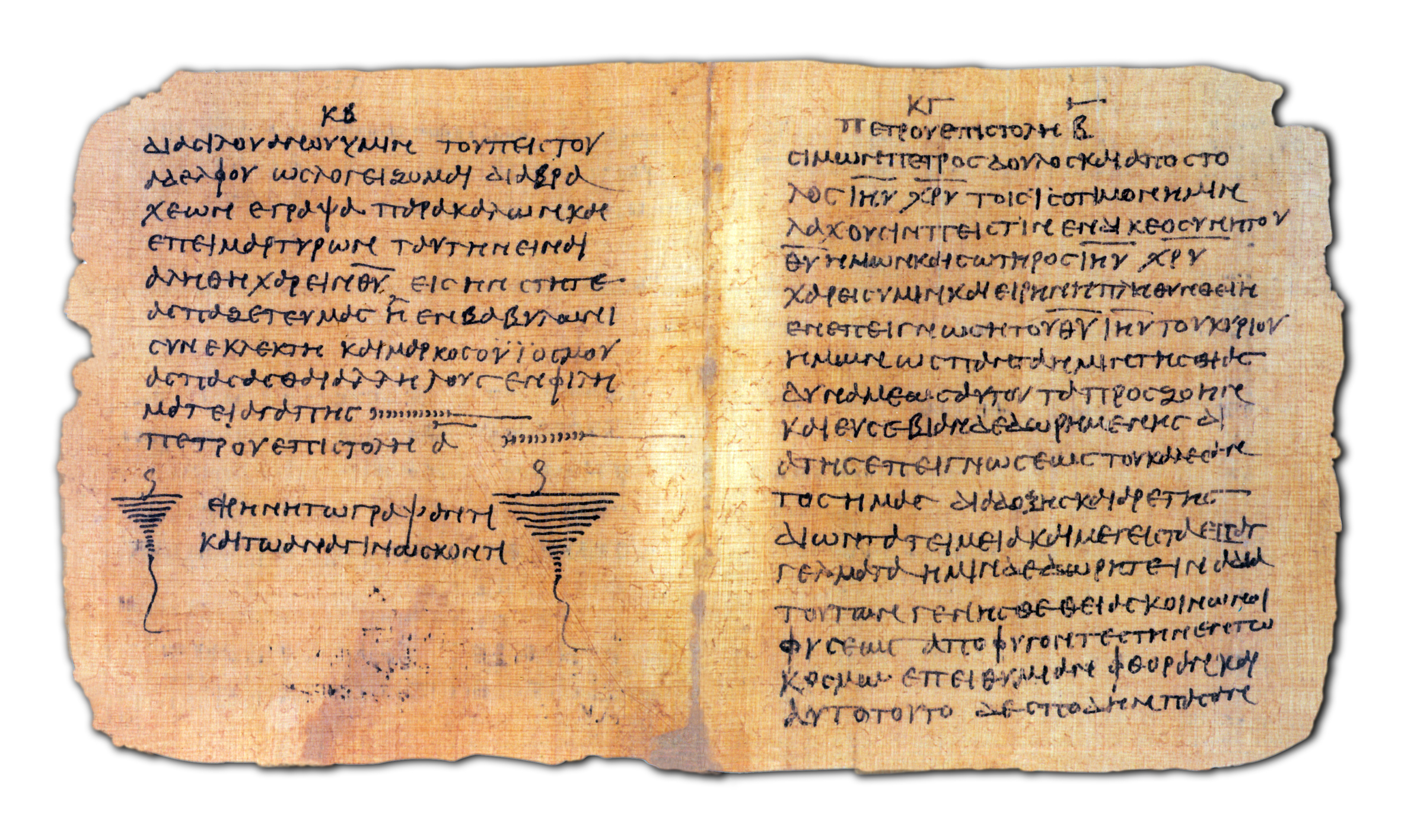
Two sides of the Papyrus Bodmer VIII, an early New Testament fragment from the third or fourth century AD containing the Epistle of Jude, 1 Peter, and 2 Peter. Origen accepted the two former as authentic without question, but noted that the latter was suspected to be a forgery.

The homilies preserved are on Genesis (16), Exodus (13), Leviticus (16), Numbers (28), Joshua (26), Judges (9), I Sam. (2), Psalms 36–38 (9), (Note: And possibly the extra 74 homilies on the Psalms. Heine 2004, p. 124) Canticles (2), Isaiah (9), Jeremiah (7 Greek, 2 Latin, 12 Greek and Latin), Ezekiel (14), and Luke (39). The homilies were preached in the church at Caesarea, with the exception of the two on 1 Samuel which were delivered in Jerusalem. Nautin has argued that they were all preached in a three-year liturgical cycle some time between 238 and 244, preceding the Commentary on the Song of Songs, where Origen refers to homilies on Judges, Exodus, Numbers, and a work on Leviticus. On June 11, 2012, the Bavarian State Library announced that the Italian philologist Marina Molin Pradel had discovered twenty-nine previously unknown homilies by Origen in a twelfth-century Byzantine manuscript from their collection. Prof. Lorenzo Perrone of Bologna University and other experts confirmed the authenticity of the homilies. The texts of these manuscripts can be found online.

Origen is the main source of information on the use of the texts that were later officially canonized as the New Testament. The information used to create the late-fourth-century Easter Letter, which declared accepted Christian writings, was probably based on the lists given in Eusebius's Ecclesiastical History HE 3:25 and 6:25, which were both primarily based on information provided by Origen. Origen accepted the authenticity of the epistles of 1 John, 1 Peter, and Jude without question and accepted the Epistle of James as authentic with only slight hesitation. He also refers to 2 John, 3 John, and 2 Peter but notes that all three were suspected to be forgeries. Origen may have also considered other writings to be "inspired" that were rejected by later authors, including the Epistle of Barnabas, Shepherd of Hermas, and 1 Clement. "Origen is not the originator of the idea of biblical canon, but he certainly gives the philosophical and literary–interpretative underpinnings for the whole notion."

=== Extant commentaries ===
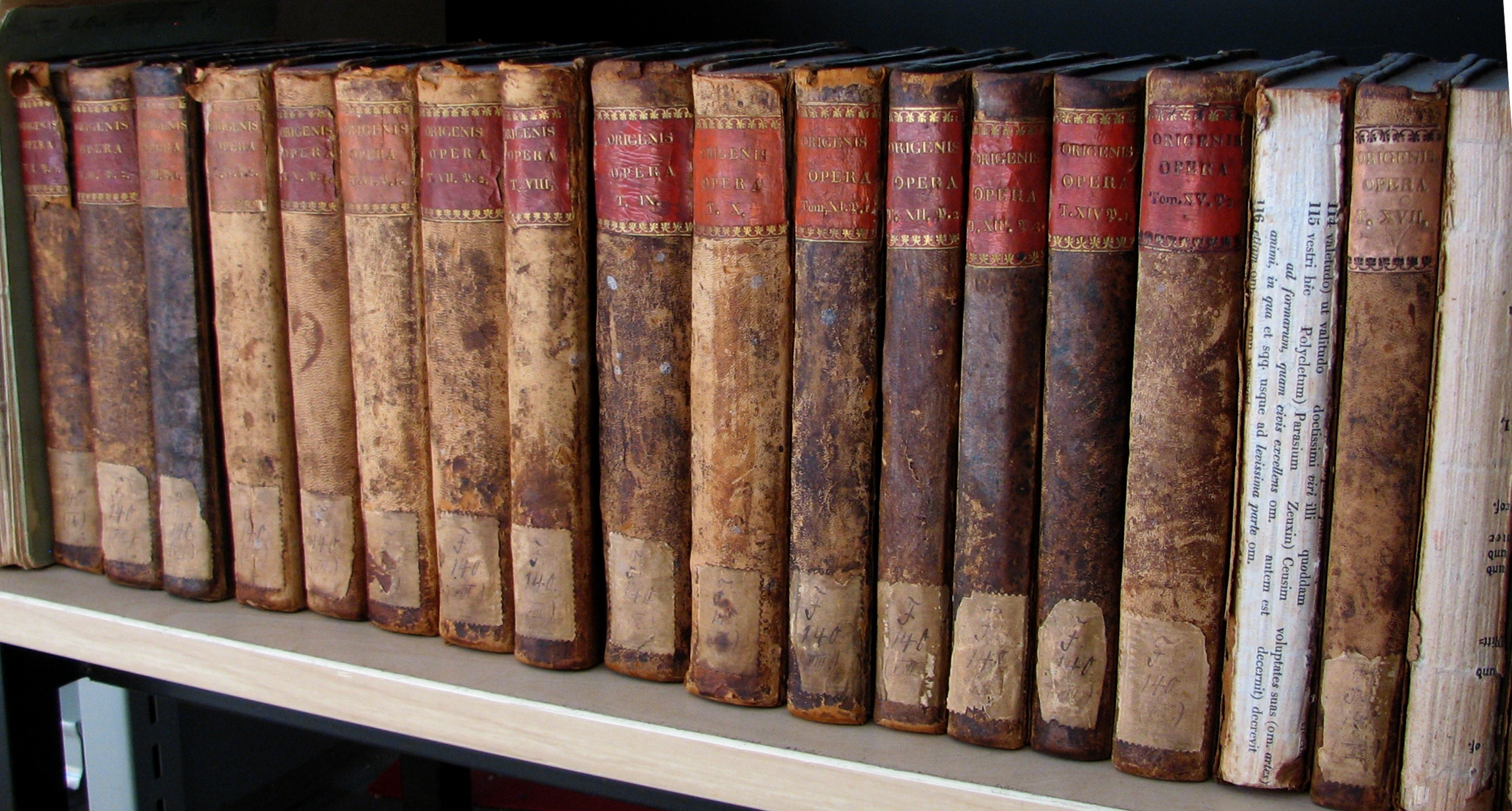
Books containing Latin translations of some of Origen's extant writings

Origen's commentaries written on specific books of scripture are much more focused on systematic exegesis than his homilies. In these writings, Origen applies the precise critical methodology that had been developed by the scholars of the Mouseion in Alexandria to the Christian scriptures. The commentaries also display Origen's impressive encyclopedic knowledge of various subjects and his ability to cross-reference specific words, listing every place in which a word appears in the scriptures along with all the word's known meanings, a feat made all the more impressive by the fact that he did this in a time when Bible concordances had not yet been compiled. Origen's massive Commentary on the Gospel of John, which spanned more than thirty-two volumes once it was completed, was written with the specific intention not only to expound the correct interpretation of the scriptures, but also to refute the interpretations of the Valentinian Gnostic teacher Heracleon, who had used the Gospel of John to support his argument that there were really two gods, not one. Of the original thirty-two books in the Commentary on John, only nine have been preserved: Books I, II, VI, X, XIII, XX, XXVIII, XXXII, and a fragment of XIX.

Of the original twenty-five books in Origen's Commentary on the Gospel of Matthew, only eight have survived in the original Greek (Books 10–17), covering Matthew 13.36–22.33. An anonymous Latin translation beginning at the point corresponding to Book 12, Chapter 9 of the Greek text and covering Matthew 16.13–27.66 has also survived. The translation contains parts that are not found in the original Greek and is missing parts that are found in it. Origen's Commentary on the Gospel of Matthew was universally regarded as a classic, even after his condemnation, and it ultimately became the work which established the Gospel of Matthew as the primary gospel. Origen's Commentary on the Epistle to the Romans was originally fifteen books long, but only tiny fragments of it have survived in the original Greek. An abbreviated Latin translation in ten books was produced by the monk Tyrannius Rufinus at the end of the fourth century. (Note: When Rufinus translated the commentary in the early fifth century he noted in his preface that some of the books were lost, and doubted his ability to 'supply' what was missing and to 'restore' the work's continuity. He also noted his intention to 'abbreviate' the work. Rufinus's abbreviated Latin version in ten books is extant. The Greek fragments were found in papyri at Tura in 1941, and contain Greek excerpts from books 5–6 of the commentary. Comparison of these fragments with Rufinus's translation led to a generally positive evaluation of Rufinus's work. Heine 2004, p. 124) The historian Socrates Scholasticus records that Origen had included an extensive discussion of the application of the title theotokos to the Virgin Mary in his commentary, but this discussion is not found in Rufinus's translation, probably because Rufinus did not approve of Origen's position on the matter, whatever that might have been.

Origen also composed a Commentary on the Song of Songs, in which he took explicit care to explain why the Song of Songs was relevant to a Christian audience. The Commentary on the Song of Songs was Origen's most celebrated commentary and Jerome famously writes in his preface to his translation of two of Origen's homilies over the Song of Songs that: "In his other works, Origen habitually excels others. In this commentary, he excelled himself." Origen expanded on the exegesis of the Jewish Rabbi Akiva, interpreting the Song of Songs as a mystical allegory in which the bridegroom represents the Logos and the bride represents the soul of the believer. This was the first Christian commentary to expound such an interpretation and it became extremely influential on later interpretations of the Song of Songs. Despite this, the commentary now only survives in part through a Latin translation of it made by Tyrannius Rufinus in 410. (Note: Books 1–3, and the beginning of the Book 4, survive, covering Song of Songs 1.1–2.15. Besides not including the later books of the commentary, Rufinus also omitted all of Origen's more technical discussions of the text. Heine 2004, p. 123) Fragments of some other commentaries survive. Citations in Origen's Philocalia include fragments of the third book of the commentary on Genesis. There is also Ps. i, iv.1, the small commentary on Canticles, and the second book of the large commentary on the same, the twentieth book of the commentary on Ezekiel, (Note: Codex Vaticanus 1215 gives the division of the twenty-five books of the commentary on Ezekiel, and part of the arrangement of the commentary on Isaiah (beginnings of books VI, VIII, XVI; book X extends from Isa. viii.1 to ix.7; XI from ix.8, to x.11; XII, from x.12 to x.23; XIII from x.24 to xi.9; XIV from xi.10 to xii.6; XV from xiii.1 to xiii.16; XXI from xix.1 to xix.17; XXII from xix.18 to xx.6; XXIII from xxi.1 to xxi.17; XXIV from xxii.1 to xxii.25; XXV from xxiii.1 to xxiii.18; XXVI from xxiv.1 to xxv.12; XXVII from xxvi.1 to xxvi.15; XXVIII from xxvi.16 to xxvii.11a; XXIX from xxvii.11b to xxviii.29; and XXX treats of xxix.1 sqq.).) and the commentary on Hosea. Of the non-extant commentaries, there is limited evidence of their arrangement. (Note: Codex Athous Laura 184 gives the division of the fifteen books of the commentary on Romans (except XI and XII) and of the five books on Galatians, as well as the extent of the commentaries on Philippians and Corinthians (Romans I from 1:1 to 1:7; II from 1:8 to 1:25; III from 1:26 to 2:11; IV from 2:12 to 3:15; V from 3:16 to 3:31; VI from 4:1 to 5:7; VII from 5:8 to 5:16; VIII from 5:17 to 6:15; IX from 6:16 to 8:8; X from 8:9 to 8:39; XIII from 11:13 to 12:15; XIV from 12:16 to 14:10; XV from 14:11 to the end; Galatians I from 1:1 to 2:2; II from 2:3 to 3:4; III from 3:5 to 4:5; IV from 4:6 to 5:5; and V from 5:6 to 6:18; the commentary on Philippians extended to 4:1; and on Ephesians to 4:13).)

=== On the First Principles ===
Origen's On the First Principles was the first ever systematic exposition of Christian theology. He composed it as a young man between 220 and 230 while he was still living in Alexandria. Fragments from Books 3.1 and 4.1–3 of Origen's Greek original are preserved in Origen's Philocalia. A few smaller quotations of the original Greek are preserved in Justinian's Letter to Mennas. The vast majority of the text has only survived in a heavily abridged Latin translation produced by Tyrannius Rufinus in 397. On the First Principles begins with an essay explaining the nature of theology. Book One describes the heavenly world and includes descriptions of the oneness of God, the relationship between the three persons of the Trinity, the nature of the divine spirit, reason, and angels. Book Two describes the world of man, including the incarnation of the Logos, the soul, free will, and eschatology. Book Three deals with cosmology, sin, and redemption. Book Four deals with teleology and the interpretation of the scriptures.

=== Against Celsus ===
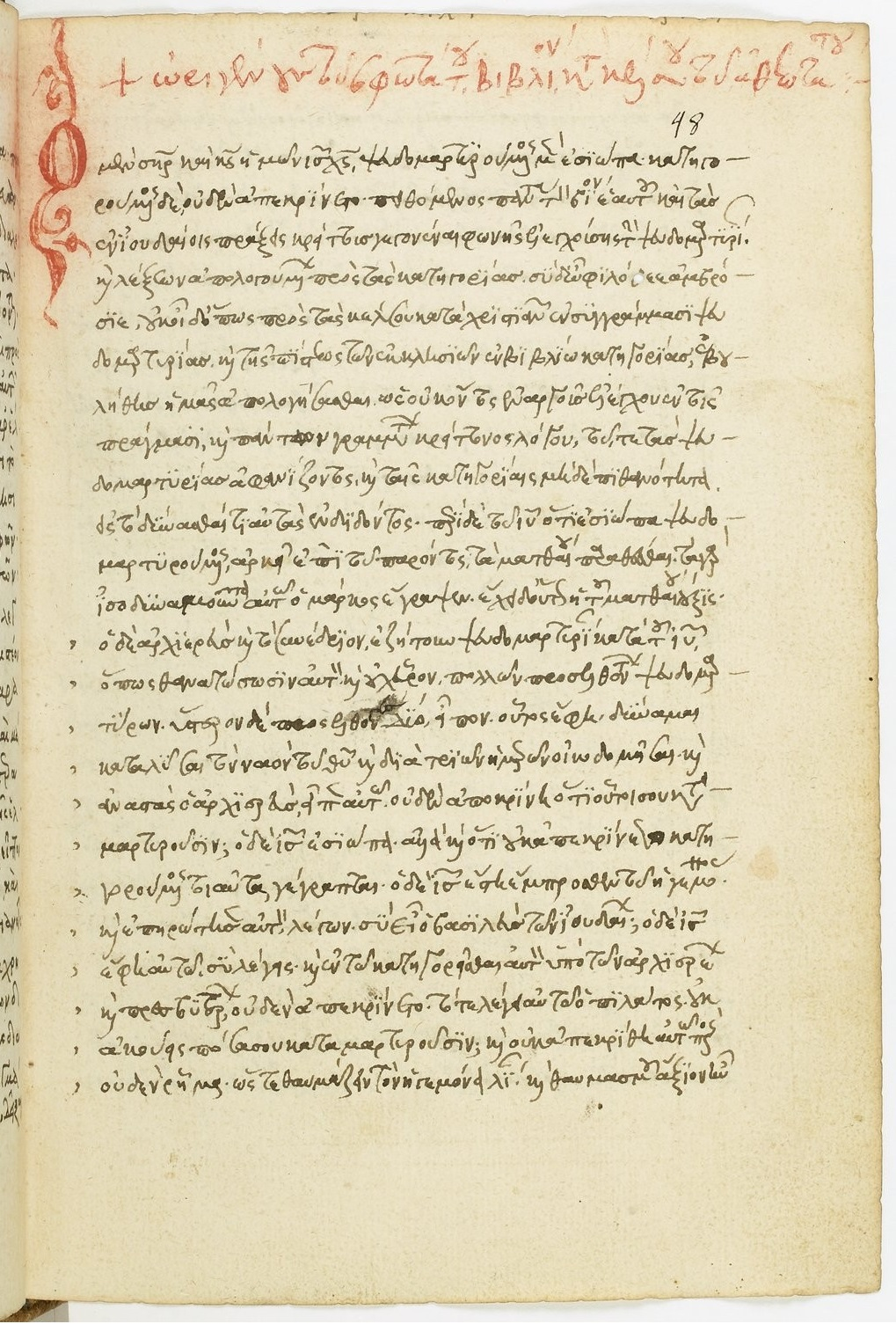
Greek text of Origen's apologetic treatise Contra Celsum, which is considered to be the most important work of early Christian apologetics

Against Celsus (Ancient Greek: Κατὰ Κέλσου Kata Kélsou; Latin: Contra Celsum), preserved entirely in Greek, was Origen's last treatise, written about 248. It is an apologetic work defending orthodox Christianity against the attacks of the pagan philosopher Celsus, who was seen in the ancient world as early Christianity's foremost opponent. In 178, Celsus had written a polemic entitled On the True Word, in which he had made numerous arguments against Christianity. The church had responded by ignoring Celsus's attacks, but Origen's patron Ambrose brought the matter to his attention. Origen initially wanted to ignore Celsus and let his attacks fade, but one of Celsus's major claims, which held that no self-respecting philosopher of the Platonic tradition would ever be so stupid as to become a Christian, provoked him to write a rebuttal.

In the book, Origen systematically refutes each of Celsus's arguments point by point and argues for a rational basis of Christian faith. Origen draws heavily on the teachings of Plato and argues that Christianity and Greek philosophy are not incompatible, and that philosophy contains much that is true and admirable, but that the Bible contains far greater wisdom than anything Greek philosophers could ever grasp. Origen responds to Celsus's accusation that Jesus had performed his miracles using magic rather than divine powers by asserting that, unlike magicians, Jesus had not performed his miracles for show, but rather to reform his audiences. Against Celsus became the most influential of all early Christian apologetics works; before it was written, Christianity was seen by many as merely a folk religion for the illiterate and uneducated, but Origen raised it to a level of academic respectability. Eusebius admired Against Celsus so much that, in his Against Hierocles 1, he declared that Against Celsus provided an adequate rebuttal to all criticisms the church would ever face.

=== Other writings ===
Between 232 and 235, while in Caesarea in Palestine, Origen wrote On Prayer, of which the full text has been preserved in the original Greek. After an introduction on the object, necessity, and advantage of prayer, he ends with an exegesis of the Lord's Prayer, concluding with remarks on the position, place, and attitude to be assumed during prayer, as well as on the classes of prayer. On Martyrdom, or the Exhortation to Martyrdom, also preserved entire in Greek, was written some time after the beginning of the persecution of Maximinus in the first half of 235. In it, Origen warns against any trifling with idolatry and emphasises the duty of suffering martyrdom manfully, while in the second part he explains the meaning of martyrdom.

The papyri discovered at Tura in 1941 contained the Greek texts of two previously unknown works of Origen. Neither work can be dated precisely, though both were probably written after the persecution of Maximinus in 235. One is On the Pascha. The other is Dialogue with Heracleides, a record written by one of Origen's stenographers of a debate between Origen and the Arabian bishop Heracleides, a quasi-Monarchianist who taught that the Father and the Son were the same. In the dialogue, Origen uses Socratic questioning to persuade Heracleides to believe in the "Logos theology", in which the Son or Logos is a separate entity from God the Father. The debate between Origen and Heracleides, and Origen's responses in particular, has been noted for its unusually cordial and respectful nature in comparison to the much fiercer polemics of Tertullian or the fourth-century debates between Trinitarians and Arians.

Lost works include two books on the Resurrection, written before On First Principles, and also two dialogues on the same theme dedicated to Ambrose. Eusebius had a collection of more than one hundred letters of Origen, and the list of Jerome speaks of several books of his epistles. Except for a few fragments, only three letters have been preserved. The first, partly preserved in the Latin translation of Rufinus, is addressed to friends in Alexandria. The second is a short letter to Gregory Thaumaturgus, preserved in the Philocalia. The third is an epistle to Sextus Julius Africanus, extant in Greek, replying to a letter from Africanus (also extant), and defending the authenticity of the Greek additions to the book of Daniel.

Many works have been falsely ascribed to Origen. Forgeries of the writings of Origen made in his lifetime are discussed by Rufinus in De adulteratione librorum Origenis. The Dialogus de recta in Deum fide, the Philosophumena attributed to Hippolytus of Rome, and the Commentary on Job by Julian the Arian have also been ascribed to him.

== Translations ==
- The Commentary of Origen On S. John's Gospel, the text revised and with a critical introduction and indices, A. E. Brooke (2 volumes, Cambridge University Press, 1896): Volume 1, Volume 2
- Contra Celsum, trans. Henry Chadwick (Cambridge: Cambridge University Press, 1965)
- On First Principles, trans. GW Butterworth (Gloucester, MA: Peter Smith, 1973), also trans. John Behr (Oxford University Press, 2019) from the Rufinus trans.
- Origen: An Exhortation to Martyrdom; Prayer; First Principles, book IV; Prologue to the Commentary on the Song of Songs; Homily XXVII on Numbers, trans. R Greer, Classics of Western Spirituality (1979)
- Origen: Homilies on Genesis and Exodus, trans. RE Heine, FC 71 (1982)
- Origen: Commentary on the Gospel according to John, Books 1–10, trans. RE Heine, FC 80 (1989)
- Treatise on the Passover and Dialogue of Origen with Heraclides and his Fellow Bishops On the Father, the Son and the Soul, trans. Robert Daly, ACW 54 (New York: Paulist Press, 1992)
- Origen: Commentary on the Gospel according to John, Books 13–32, trans. RE Heine, FC 89 (1993)
- The Commentaries on Origen and Jerome on St Paul's Epistle to the Ephesians, RE Heine, OECS (Oxford: OUP, 2002)
- The Commentary of Origen on the Gospel of St Matthew, 2 vols., trans. RE Heine, OECS (Oxford: OUP, 2018)
- Commentary on the Epistle to the Romans Books 1–5, 2001, Thomas P. Scheck, trans., The Fathers of the Church series, Volume 103, Catholic University of America Press, ISBN 0-8132-0103-9, ISBN 9780813201030
- Commentary on the Epistle to the Romans Books 6–10 (Fathers of the Church), 2002, The Fathers of the Church, Thomas P. Scheck, trans., Volume 104, Catholic University of America Press, ISBN 0-8132-0104-7, ISBN 9780813201047
- On Prayer in Tertullian, Cyprian and Origen, "On the Lord's Prayer", translated and annotated by Alistair Stewart-Sykes (Crestwood, NY: St Vladimir's Seminary Press, 2004), pp. 111–214

Translations available online

- Translations of eight of Origen's writings can be found in Ante-Nicene Fathers or in the New Advent section on the Fathers of the Church.
- Material not in those collections includes:
  - Dialogue with Heracleides ("Origen – Dialog with Heracleides – Christian History". Archived from the original on 2013-09-11.)
  - On Prayer (William A Curtis. "Origen, On Prayer (Unknown date). Translation". Tertullian.org.)
  - Philocalia (Origen. "The Philocalia of Origen (1911) pp. 1–237. English translation". Tertullian.org.)

== See also ==
- Allegorical interpretations of Plato
- Apocatastasis
- Descriptions in antiquity of the execution cross
- Pre-existence of the soul
- Pseudo-Origen
