= List of The Chosen characters =

The Chosen is an American historical drama television series created, directed and co-written by American filmmaker Dallas Jenkins. It is the first multiseason series about the life and ministry of Jesus of Nazareth. Primarily set in Judaea and Galilee in the 1st century, the series centers on Jesus and the different people who met and followed or otherwise interacted with him. The series stars Jonathan Roumie as Jesus, alongside Shahar Isaac, Elizabeth Tabish, Paras Patel, Noah James, and George H. Xanthis.

== Cast ==
=== Main ===
= Main cast (credited)
= Recurring cast (2+)
= Guest cast (1)

Character	Portrayed by	Seasons				
Character	Portrayed by	1	2	3	4	5
Simon Peter	Shahar Isaac (Note: Max Valentin Esquivel portrays a child Simon Peter)	Main	Main	Main	Main	Main
Jesus	Jonathan Roumie (Note: James Nowosielski, Darren Valinotti, and Shayan Naveed Fazli portray baby, child, and adolescent Jesus, respectively)	Main	Main	Main	Main	Main
Mary Magdalene	Elizabeth Tabish (Note: Camila Carreon portrays a child Mary Magdalene)	Main	Main	Main	Main	Main
Matthew the Apostle	Paras Patel	Main	Main	Main	Main	Main
Andrew	Noah James	Main	Main	Main	Main	Main
Zohara	Janis Dardaris	Main				Guest
Eden	Lara Silva	Main	Guest	Main	Main	Main
Shmuel	Shaan Sharma	Main	Main	Main	Main	Main
Zebedee	Nick Shakoour	Main	Main	Main	Main	Main
John the Apostle	George H. Xanthis (Note: William Spinelli portrays a child John the Apostle)	Main	Main	Main	Main	Main
Big James	Shayan Sobhian (Note: Sobhian portrays Big James in season 1, episodes 1–4)	Main				
Big James	Kian Kavousi (Note: Kavousi portrays Big James in season 1, episodes 5–8)	Main				
Big James	Abe Bueno-Jallad (Note: Bueno-Jallad has portrayed Big James since season 2) (Note: Roxton Garcia portrays a child Big James)		Main	Main	Main	Main
Nicodemus	Erick Avari	Main				Main
Quintus Benedictus Dio	Brandon Potter	Main	Recurring	Main	Main	
Gaius	Kirk B. R. Woller	Main	Recurring	Main	Main	Main
Thaddaeus	Giavani Cairo	Main	Main	Main	Main	Main
Little James	Jordan Walker Ross	Main	Main	Main	Main	Main
Thomas	Joey Vahedi	Guest	Main	Main	Main	Main
Ramah	Yasmine Al-Bustami	Guest	Main	Main	Main	Guest
Mary of Nazareth	Vanessa Benavente (Note: Sara Anne recurs as a younger Mary)	Guest	Main	Main	Main	Main
Philip	Yoshi Barrigas (Note: Barrigas portrays Philip in seasons 2–3)		Main	Main		
Philip	Reza Diako (Note: Diako has portrayed Philip since season 4)				Main	Main
Nathanael	Austin Reed Alleman		Main	Main	Main	Main
Simon Z.	Alaa Safi (Note: Joseph Scott Campbell portrays an adolescent Simon Z.)		Main	Main	Main	Main
Judas Iscariot	Luke Dimyan		Guest	Main	Main	Main
Yussif	Ivan Jasso	Recurring	Recurring	Main	Main	Main
Tamar	Amber Shana Williams	Guest	Recurring	Main	Main	Main
Atticus Aemilius Pulcher	Elijah Alexander		Recurring	Main	Main	Main

=== Recurring ===
Character	Portrayed by	Seasons				
Character	Portrayed by	1	2	3	4	5
The Blind Beggar	Andrew Flagg	Recurring			Guest	
John the Baptizer	David Amito	Recurring	Recurring	Recurring	Recurring	Recurring
Josiah	Steve Shermett	Recurring		Guest	Guest	
Salome of Capernaum	Nina Rose Leon	Recurring	Guest	Recurring	Recurring	Recurring
Dasha	Leticia Magaña	Recurring		Recurring		
Jesse	Dennis Apergis (Note: Benjamin Issa and Chris Edward Garcia portray child and adolescent Jesse, respectively)		Recurring		Guest	Recurring
Yanni	Wasim No'mani		Recurring	Recurring	Recurring	Recurring
Madai	Tony Sears		Recurring			
Lamech	Sergio Lanza		Recurring			
Alphaeus	Troy Caylak	Guest		Recurring		
Jairus	Alessandro Colla			Recurring	Recurring	Guest
Barabbas	Michael Steger			Recurring		Guest
Veronica	Zhaleh Vossough			Recurring	Guest	Recurring
Leander	Tom Connolly			Recurring		Guest
Michal	Mel Mehrabian			Recurring		
Nili	Ella McCain			Recurring		
Akiva	Philip Shahbaz			Recurring	Recurring	
Fatiyah	Sonya Balmores			Recurring		Recurring
Dion	Andy Dispensa			Recurring		Guest
Argo	Greg Roman			Recurring		
Telemachus	Kace Winfield			Recurring		
Ivo	Malachi Grayson			Recurring	Guest	
Chuza	Nick Chinlund				Recurring	
Joanna	Amy Bailey			Guest	Recurring	Recurring
Herodias	Shereen Khan				Recurring	
Herod Antipas	Paul Ben-Victor				Recurring	Guest
Joseph Ben Caiaphas	Richard Fancy				Recurring	Recurring
Zebadiah	Brad Culver				Recurring	Recurring
Shammai	Ric Sarabia		Guest	Guest	Recurring	
David	Jorge Franco IV		Guest	Guest	Recurring	Guest
Lazarus	Demetrios Troy			Guest	Recurring	Guest
Martha	Sophia Cameron Blum			Guest	Recurring	Recurring
Mary of Bethany	Catherine Lidstone			Guest	Recurring	Recurring
Gedera	Liche Ariza				Recurring	Recurring
Malchus	Jonathan Togo					Recurring
Pontius Pilate	Andrew James Allen			Guest	Guest	Recurring
Claudia	Sarah J. Bartholomew			Guest	Guest	Recurring
Matthias	Jake Sidney Cohen				Guest	Recurring
Ozem	Ethan Flower			Guest	Guest	Recurring
Simon of Cyrene	Tony N. King					Recurring
Shimon	Juri Henley-Cohn				Guest	Recurring
Tova	Camille Kasemsri					Recurring
John Mark	Nick Alvarez					Recurring

== Main characters ==
=== Simon Peter ===
Portrayed by Shahar Isaac, Simon Peter is a former fisherman in Capernaum, who is the de facto leader and one of the twelve disciples, called apostles, of Jesus. He is one of the sons of Jonah, the older brother of Andrew, the husband of Eden, the son-in-law of Dasha, and a former fishing partner of Zebedee and his sons. Alongside the two brothers, Big James and John, Simon Peter is part of Jesus's inner circle. Jesus gives Simon a new name, Peter, meaning "rock".

Max Valentin Esquivel portrays a child Simon Peter.

=== Jesus ===
Portrayed by Jonathan Roumie, Jesus is a craftsman and a rabbi from Nazareth. The son of Mary and Joseph, and the cousin of John the Baptizer, he is considered the Messiah and the Son of God by some, but due to the crowds that follow him, he is viewed as a potential threat by others. Jesus often identifies himself as the "Son of Man".

James Nowosielski, Darren Valinotti, and Shayan Naveed Fazli portray baby, child, and adolescent Jesus, respectively.

=== Mary Magdalene ===
Portrayed by Elizabeth Tabish, Mary Magdalene is a formerly demon-possessed woman from Magdala and one of the women helping Jesus's ministry.

Camila Carreon portrays a child Mary Magdalene.

=== Matthew the Apostle ===
Portrayed by Paras Patel, Matthew is a former tax collector in Capernaum and one of the twelve disciples, called apostles, of Jesus. He is the son of Alphaeus and the former tax collector of Simon Peter and Andrew.

Director Dallas Jenkins, who has stated he is "very familiar with the Autism community", chose to have Matthew portrayed as being on the Autism spectrum, with certain mannerisms of his character reflecting this despite the show never explicitly describing him as autistic nor the historical Matthew the Apostle having been described as such. While controversial, this received praise from those with autism and other mental or physical conditions.

=== Andrew ===
Portrayed by Noah James, Andrew is a former fisherman in Capernaum and one of the twelve disciples, called apostles, of Jesus. He is one of the sons of Jonah, the younger brother of Simon Peter, a former disciple of John the Baptizer, a friend of Philip from his hometown, Bethsaida, and a former fishing partner of Zebedee and his sons. Alongside Philip, he is a former comrade of Avner and Nadab.

=== Zohara ===
Portrayed by Janis Dardaris, Zohara is the wife of Nicodemus.

=== Eden ===
Portrayed by Lara Silva, Eden is the wife of Simon Peter, the daughter of Dasha, and one of the women helping Jesus's ministry.

=== Shmuel ===
Portrayed by Shaan Sharma, Shmuel is a leading Pharisee from Capernaum and a member of the Sanhedrin.

=== Zebedee ===
Portrayed by Nick Shakoour, Zebedee is a former fisherman in Capernaum, the father of Big James and John, the husband of Salome, and a former fishing partner of Simon Peter and Andrew.

=== John the Apostle ===
Portrayed by George H. Xanthis, John is a former fisherman in Capernaum and one of the twelve disciples, called apostles, of Jesus. He is one of the sons of Zebedee and Salome, the younger brother of Big James, and a former fishing partner of Simon Peter and Andrew. Jesus nicknames him and his brother, Big James, the "sons of thunder". Alongside Simon Peter and Big James, John is a part of Jesus's inner circle.

William Spinelli portrays a child John the Apostle.

=== Big James ===
Portrayed by Shayan Sobhian and Kian Kavousi in season 1 then by Abe Bueno-Jallad starting with season 2, Big James is a former fisherman in Capernaum and one of the twelve disciples, called apostles, of Jesus. He is one of the sons of Zebedee and Salome, the older brother of John, and a former fishing partner of Simon Peter and Andrew. Jesus nicknames him and his brother, John, the "sons of thunder". Alongside Simon Peter and John, Big James is a part of Jesus's inner circle.

Roxton Garcia portrays a child Big James.

=== Nicodemus ===
Portrayed by Erick Avari, Nicodemus is a leading Pharisee from Jerusalem, a respected rabbi, and a high-ranking member of the Sanhedrin. He is a secret disciple of Jesus.

=== Quintus Benedictus Dio ===
Portrayed by Brandon Potter, Quintus Benedictus Dio is a former Roman magistrate in Capernaum and the former Praetor of Galilee.

=== Gaius ===
Portrayed by Kirk B. R. Woller, Gaius is a former high-ranking Roman centurion and a Roman magistrate in Capernaum, the father of his servant son named Ivo, and the current Praetor of Galilee. He is the former guard of Matthew.

=== Thaddaeus ===
Portrayed by Giavani Cairo, Thaddaeus is a former stonemason in Bethsaida and one of the twelve disciples, called apostles, of Jesus.

=== Little James ===
Portrayed by Jordan Walker Ross, Little James is a former prospective member of the 288 Jerusalem Temple choir and one of the twelve disciples, called apostles, of Jesus.

=== Thomas ===
Portrayed by Joey Vahedi, Thomas is a former caterer from the Plains of Sharon, the partner of Ramah, and one of the twelve disciples, called apostles, of Jesus.

=== Ramah ===
Portrayed by Yasmine Al-Bustami, Ramah is a former vintner from Tel Dor, the partner of Thomas, and one of the women helping Jesus's ministry.

While many parts of Ramah's character and arc were added for the show, she represents the many women who helped Jesus's ministry and was featured as a major character to provide emotional depth to the series. Her death sparked controversy among audiences, though Jenkins and his wife deemed the plot point necessary to spark discussion on a recurring theme in Christianity and other faiths.

=== Mary of Nazareth ===
Portrayed by Vanessa Benavente, Mary is the earthly mother of Jesus, the widowed wife of Joseph, the daughter of Joachim of Nazareth, and one of the women helping Jesus's ministry. She is a relative of the couple, Elizabeth and Zechariah, and the aunt of John the Baptizer.

Sara Anne recurs as a younger Mary.

=== Philip ===
Portrayed by Yoshi Barrigas in seasons 2 and 3 then by Reza Diako starting with season 4, Philip is a former disciple of John the Baptizer and one of the twelve disciples, called apostles, of Jesus. He is both a companion of Andrew from his hometown, Bethsaida, and an old friend of Nathanael. Alongside Andrew, he is a former comrade of Avner and Nadab.

=== Nathanael ===
Portrayed by Austin Reed Alleman, Nathanael is a former architect in Caesarea Philippi from Cana and one of the twelve disciples, called apostles, of Jesus. He is the son of Talmai and an old friend of Philip.

=== Simon Z. ===
Portrayed by Alaa Safi, Simon Z. is a former Zealot from Ashkelon and one of the twelve disciples, called apostles, of Jesus. He is the brother of Jesse, the healed paralytic at the Pool of Bethesda.

Joseph Scott Campbell portrays an adolescent Simon Z.

=== Judas Iscariot ===
Portrayed by Luke Dimyan, Judas Iscariot is a former business apprentice from Kerioth, who is the treasurer and one of the twelve disciples, called apostles, of Jesus. He is the son of Simon Iscariot.

=== Yussif ===
Portrayed by Ivan Jasso, Yussif is a leading Pharisee from Jerusalem, a respected rabbi, and a high-ranking member of the Sanhedrin. He is a secret disciple of Jesus.

=== Tamar ===
Portrayed by Amber Shana Williams, Tamar is an Ethiopian friend of Ethan, the healed paralytic in Capernaum, from Heliopolis, and one of the women helping Jesus's ministry.

=== Atticus Aemilius Pulcher ===
Portrayed by Elijah Alexander, Atticus Aemilius Pulcher is one of the Roman cohortes urbanae sent from Rome to investigate the Zealots and then Jesus.

== Recurring characters ==
- The Blind Beggar (Andrew Flagg) The blind beggar is a miracle recipient of Jesus on the road in Capernaum.
- John the Baptizer (David Amito) John is an eccentric rabbi, a wandering preacher in the wilderness who baptizes in the Jordan River, and the cousin of Jesus. He is the son of Elizabeth and Zechariah, and a nephew of Mary. He is the former rabbi of Andrew and Philip and the rabbi of Avner and Nadab.
- Josiah (Steve Shermett) Josiah is a Pharisee in Capernaum.
- Salome of Capernaum (Nina Rose Leon) Salome is the wife of Zebedee, the mother of Big James and John, and one of the women helping Jesus's ministry.
- Dasha (Leticia Magana) Dasha is the mother-in-law of Simon Peter and the mother of Eden.
- Jesse (Dennis Apergis) Jesse is a former paralytic from Ashkelon, who is healed by Jesus at the Pool of Bethesda. He is the brother of Simon Z.
- Yanni (Wasim No'mani) Yanni is a leading Pharisee in Jerusalem.
- Madai (Tony Sears) Madai is a leading Pharisee in Wadi Kelt.
- Lamech (Sergio Lanza) Lamech is a Pharisee in Wadi Kelt.
- Alphaeus (Troy Caylak) Alphaeus is the father of Matthew.
- Jairus (Alessandro Colla) Jairus is the synagogue administrator in Capernaum, the husband of Michal, and the father of Nili. He is a secret disciple of Jesus.
- Barabbas (Michael Steger) Barabbas is a Zealot and a former comrade of Simon Z.
- Veronica (Zhaleh Vossough) Veronica is a woman from Caesarea Philippi, who has formerly suffered from a discharge of blood for twelve years and is healed by Jesus.
- Leander (Tom Connolly) Leander is one of the Greeks from Naveh in the Decapolis who seeks Jesus with the help of Andrew and Philip.
- Michal (Mel Mehrabian) Michal is the wife of Jairus and the mother of Nili.
- Nili (Ella McCain) Nili is the daughter of Jairus and Michal.
- Akiva (Philip Shahbaz) Akiva is a leading Pharisee in Capernaum.
- Fatiyah (Sonya Balmores) Fatiyah is a Nabataean who seeks Jesus with the help of Andrew and Philip.
- Dion (Andy Dispensa) Dion is a Syrophoenician who seeks Jesus with the help of Andrew and Philip.
- Argo (Greg Roman) Argo is a Gentile former deaf-mute from Abila in the Decapolis, who is healed by Jesus. He is the father of Telemachus.
- Telemachus (Kace Winfield) Telemachus is a boy from Abila in the Decapolis, who offers five loaves of bread and two fishes. He is the son of Argo.
- Ivo (Malachi Grayson) Ivo is the servant son of Gaius.
- Chuza (Nick Chinlund) Chuza is the household manager of King Herod Antipas and the husband of Joanna.
- Joanna (Amy Bailey) Joanna is the wife of the household manager Chuza, a woman who works in King Herod Antipas's court in Machaerus, and one of the women helping Jesus's ministry. She is a friend of Phoebe, a follower of Jesus.
- Herodias (Shereen Khan) Queen Herodias is the wife of King Herod Antipas and the mother of Salome. She has been formerly married to King Herod Antipas's brother, Philip.
- Herod Antipas (Paul Ben-Victor) King Herod Antipas is the tetrarch who serves as the client king of Galilee and Perea. The stepfather of Salome, he is the husband of Queen Herodias, who is his brother's, Philip's, former wife. He is the former husband of Phasaelis.
- Joseph Ben Caiaphas (Richard Fancy) Joseph Ben Caiaphas is a leading Sadducee in Jerusalem, the high priest of Israel, and the leader of the Sanhedrin. He is the son-in-law of the former high priest Annas, the brother-in-law of Ananus, and the husband of Shoshana.
- Zebadiah (Brad Culver) Zebadiah is a leading Pharisee in Jerusalem and a member of the Sanhedrin.
- Shammai (Ric Sarabia) Shammai is a leading Pharisee in Jerusalem and both a high-ranking member and the Av Beit Din of the Sanhedrin whose influential house opposes the House of Shimon, son of Hillel.
- David (Jorge Franco IV) King David is a shepherd, a poet, a musician playing the lyre, a psalmist, and the king of Israel. He is a former fugitive from the former king, Saul. The husband of Queen Bathsheba and Abigail, he is the father of Daniel. He is an ancestor of Jesus.
- Lazarus (Demetrios Troy) Lazarus is a businessman in Bethany, a childhood friend of Jesus, and the brother of Mary and Martha.
- Martha (Sophia Cameron Blum) Martha is a woman in Bethany, who is the sister of Lazarus and Mary, and one of the women helping Jesus's ministry.
- Mary of Bethany (Catherine Lidstone) Mary is a woman in Bethany, who is the sister of Lazarus and Martha, and one of the women helping Jesus's ministry.
- Gedera (Liche Ariza) Gedera is a leading Sadducee in Jerusalem and a member of the Sanhedrin.
- Malchus (Jonathan Togo) Malchus is the chief servant of Joseph Ben Caiaphas.
- Pontius Pilate (Andrew James Allen) Pontius Pilate is the Roman Procurator in Jerusalem and the governor of Judea. He is the husband of Claudia.
- Claudia (Sarah J. Bartholomew) Claudia is the wife of Pontius Pilate.
- Matthias (Jake Sidney Cohen) Matthias is a disciple of Jesus who watches closely at Jesus's ministry.
- Ozem (Ethan Flower) Ozem is a leading Pharisee in Jerusalem and a member of the Sanhedrin.
- Simon of Cyrene (Tony N. King) Simon is a vendor who sells birds as sacrificial offerings in Jerusalem from Cyrene of Jebel Akhdar in Libya.
- Shimon (Juri Henley-Cohn) Shimon is a leading Pharisee in Jerusalem and a high-ranking member of the Sanhedrin whose influential house opposes the House of Shammai. He is the son of Hillel.
- Tova (Camille Kasemsri) Tova is a servant girl of Joseph Ben Caiaphas under Malchus.
- John Mark (Nick Alvarez) John Mark is a young disciple of Jesus who attends to the Last Supper. He is the son of Jakim and Mary.

== Guest characters ==
- Joseph of Nazareth (Raj Bond) (seasons 1, 3, 5, and 6): Joseph is a carpenter from Nazareth, the deceased husband of Mary, and the earthly father of Jesus.
- The Master of the Banquet (Phil Mendoza) (season 1): The Master of the Banquet is the host of the wedding in Cana, where Jesus turns water into wine.
- The Leper on the Road (Stephen Hailo) (season 1): The leper on the road is a miracle recipient of Jesus on the way to Capernaum.
- Ethan (Noe de la Garza) (seasons 1–2): Ethan is a former paralytic in Capernaum, who is healed by Jesus. He is a friend of Tamar.
- Moses (Stelio Savante) (season 1): Moses is the leader of the Israelites, who delivers them out of Egypt, and the mentor of Joshua.
- Joshua (Advait Ghuge) (season 1): Joshua is the assistant of Moses.
- Photina (Vanessa DeSilvio) (seasons 1–2): Photina is a Samaritan woman in Sychar and the wife of Neriah.
- Jacob (Amato D'Apolito) (season 1): Jacob is one of the patriarchs, the grandson of Abraham, the son of Isaac, and the ancestor of Israel.
- Neriah (Maz Siam) (seasons 1–2): Neriah is the fifth husband of Photina.
- Melech (Nikhil Prakash) (season 2): Melech is a former Samaritan crippled robber who is healed by Jesus.
- Caleb / Belial (Anthony Michael Irizarry) (season 2): Caleb is a former demoniac in Jericho, who is formerly possessed by Belial, the spawn of Oriax and the Fifth Knight of Legion.
- Ahimelech (Marty Lindsey) (season 2): Ahimelech is the high priest in Nob, Israel during David's time and the father of Abiathar.
- Elam (Shaun Bedgood) (season 2): Elam is a synagogue congregant in Wadi Kelt, who formerly has a withered hand and is healed by Jesus.
- Abiathar (Major Dodge Jr.) (season 2): Abiathar is the son of Ahimelech.
- Avner (Ash Kahn) (seasons 3–5): Avner is a disciple of John the Baptizer and a former comrade of Andrew and Philip. Alongside Nadab, he is one of the two messengers John the Baptizer sends to Jesus.
- Nadab (Austen Parros) (season 3): Nadab is a disciple of John the Baptizer and a former comrade of Andrew and Philip. Alongside Avner, he is one of the two messengers John the Baptizer sends to Jesus.
- Matthew the Shepherd (Mike Saad) (season 3): Matthew is a shepherd in Bethlehem who resides in Capernaum. Alongside his fellow shepherd, Simon, he has witnessed the birth of Jesus.
- Asaph (Pezh Maan) (season 3): Asaph is a psalmist, a poet, and a choir director of King David. Alongside Jeduthun as the music composer, Asaph writes a Psalm.
- Bathsheba (Moriah Smallbone) (seasons 3–4): Bathsheba is a wife of King David and the Queen of Israel.
- Jeduthun (Moud Sabra) (season 3): Jeduthun is the chief musician and a choir director of King David. He composes the music for the Psalm of Asaph.
- Zechariah the Priest (Tony Amendola) (season 4): Zechariah is a priest in Jerusalem, the husband of Elizabeth, and the father of John the Baptizer.
- Elizabeth (K Callan) (season 4): Elizabeth is the wife of Zechariah, the mother of John the Baptizer, and a relative of Mary and Jesus.
- Salome of Machaerus (Briar Nolet) (season 4): Salome is the daughter of Queen Herodias and the stepdaughter of King Herod Antipas.
- Uzziah (Ryan Radis) (season 4): Uzziah is a former man born blind who is healed by Jesus.
- Father of Uzziah (J Santiago Suarez) (season 4): The father of Uzziah is the husband of the mother of Uzziah.
- Mother of Uzziah (Federica Estaba Rangel) (season 4): The mother of Uzziah is the wife of the father of Uzziah.
- Decanus (Konstantin Melikhov) (seasons 4–5): Decanus is a high-ranking Roman centurion who encounters John the Baptizer and Jesus in Judea.
- Zechariah of Bethphage (Iman Nazemzade) (season 4): Zechariah is the owner of the donkey on which Jesus rides into Jerusalem from Bethphage.
- Abigail (Angelica Amor) (season 4): Abigail is a wife of King David and the mother of Daniel.
- Daniel (Bryce Robin) (season 4): Daniel is the son of King David and Abigail.
- Dori (Tanya Kaur) (seasons 5-6): Dori is a servant girl of Joseph Ben Caiaphas under Malchus.
- Ananus (Laith Nakli) (season 5): Ananus is a leading Sadducee in Jerusalem, a son of Annas, a brother-in-law of Joseph Ben Caiaphas, and a brother of Shoshana.
- Shoshana (Ava Eisenson) (season 5): Shoshana is the wife of Joseph Ben Caiaphas, the daughter of Annas, and the sister of Ananus.
- Jakim (Fareed Ward) (season 5): Jakim is the father of John Mark, the husband of Mary, a discreet follower of Jesus, and the master of the house where the Upper Room is.
- Abraham (Shaun Toub) (season 5): Abraham is one of the patriarchs of Israel, the father of Isaac, and the grandfather of Jacob.
- Ezekiel (Kirk Taylor) (season 5): Ezekiel is a prophet of Israel during the Babylonian captivity. He is also called the "son of man".
- Isaac (Jai Renfro) (season 5): Isaac is one of the patriarchs of Israel, the son of Abraham, and the father of Jacob.
