= Matthew 8:12 =

- ← 8:11 8:13 →
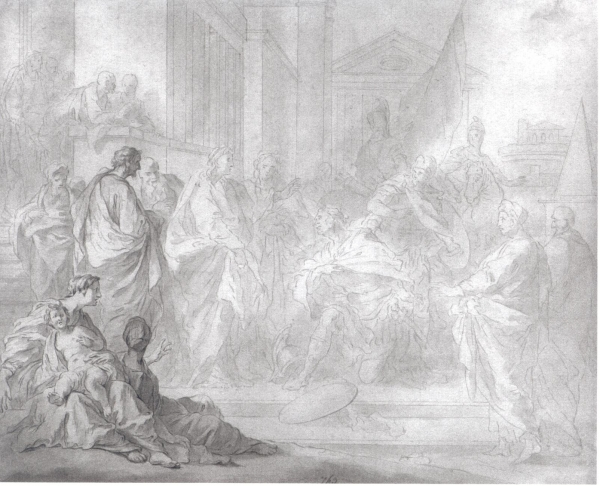
- "Centurion from Capernaum before Jesus", by Jean Jouvenet (17th century).
- Book: Gospel of Matthew
- Christian Bible part: New Testament

Matthew 8:12 is the twelfth verse of the eighth chapter of the Gospel of Matthew in the New Testament. This verse is part of the conclusion to the miracle story of healing the centurion's servant, the second of a series of miracles in Matthew. This verse warns that many Jews are lacking in faith after praising the Gentile Centurion in the previous verse for his.

== Content ==
In the original Greek according to Westcott-Hort this verse is:

οι δε υιοι της βασιλειας εκβληθησονται εις το σκοτος το
εξωτερον εκει εσται ο κλαυθμος και ο βρυγμος των οδοντων

In the King James Version of the Bible the text reads:

But the sons of the kingdom will be cast out into outer darkness.
There will be weeping and gnashing of teeth.”

The New International Version translates the passage as:

But the subjects of the kingdom will be thrown outside, into the
darkness, where there will be weeping and gnashing of teeth."

== Analysis ==
The previous verse describes the faithful being invited to a great banquet. This verse outlines the fate of those who are not invited. They are to be outside the place of celebration in a place of darkness and misery. The phrase weeping and gnashing of teeth makes its first appearance in this verse. It recurs four other times in Matthew and also appears in Luke 13:28. It remains a standard English expression for sorrow and torment. The place of punishment being one of darkness was a standard depiction in both Jewish and Christian writings of this period.

Sons of the kingdom is a reference to the Jewish people. This verse was commonly read to imply that many Jews would be excluded from salvation. Davies and Allison argue against this, noting that the text can be equally read as all or some of the subjects of the Kingdom and there are many depictions later in the Gospel of Jews accepting Jesus. This was a radical statement as it was believed that the sons of the kingdom, as the heirs of Abraham could not be excluded, but here Jesus is saying that salvation does not come via race or descent.

== Commentary from the Church Fathers ==
Augustine: As we see Christians called to the heavenly feast, where is the bread of righteousness, the drink of wisdom; so we see the Jews in reprobation. The children of the kingdom shall be cast into outer darkness, that is, the Jews, who have received the Law, who observe the types of all things that were to be, yet did not acknowledge the realities when present.

Jerome: Or the Jews may be called the children of the kingdom, because God reigned among them heretofore.

Chrysostom: Or, He calls them the children of the kingdom, because the kingdom was prepared for them, which was the greater grief to them.

Augustine: Moses set before the people of Israel no other God than the God of Abraham, Isaac, and Jacob, and Christ sets forth the very same God. So that so far was He from seeking to turn that people away from their own God, that He therefore threatened them with the outer darkness, because He saw them turned away from their own God. And in this kingdom He tells them the Gentiles shall sit down with Abraham, Isaac, and Jacob, for no other reason than that they held the faith of Abraham, Isaac, and Jacob. To these Fathers Christ gives His testimony, not as though they had been converted after death, or had received justification after His passion.

Jerome: It is called outer darkness, because he whom the Lord casts out leaves the light.

Haymo of Halberstadt: What they should suffer there, He shows when He adds, There shall be weeping and gnashing of teeth. Thus in metaphor He describes the sufferings of the tormented limbs; the eyes shed tears when filled with smoke, and the teeth chatter together from cold. This shows that the wicked in hell shall endure both extreme cold and extreme heat: according to that in Job, They shall pass from rivers of snow to the scorching heat. (Job 24:19.)

Jerome: Weeping and gnashing of teeth are a proof of bones and body; truly then is there a resurrection of the same limbs, that sank into the grave.

Rabanus Maurus: Or; The gnashing of teeth expresses the passion of remorse; repentance coming too late and self-accusation that he has sinned with such obstinate wickedness.

Remigius: Otherwise; By outer darkness, He means foreign nations; for these words of the Lord are a historical prediction of the destruction of the Jews, that they were to be led into captivity for their unbelief, and to be scattered over the earth; for tears are usually caused by heat, gnashing of teeth by cold. Weeping then is ascribed to those who should be dispersed into the warmer climates of India and Ethiopia, gnashing of teeth to those who should dwell in the colder regions, as Hyrcania and Seythia.

| Preceded by Matthew 8:11 | Gospel of Matthew; Chapter 8 | Succeeded by Matthew 8:13 |
