= Matthew 8:9 =

- ← 8:8 8:10 →
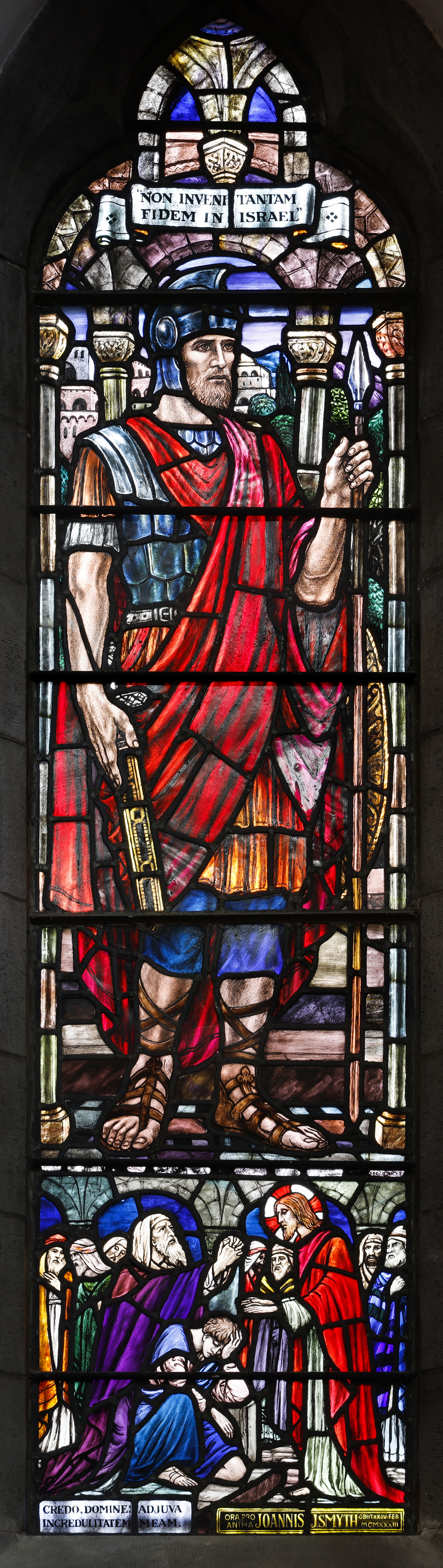
- Stained glass window by Alfred Ernest Child at St. Brendan's Cathedral, Loughrea, County Galway, Ireland, depicting the Centurion
- Book: Gospel of Matthew
- Christian Bible part: New Testament

Matthew 8:9 is the ninth verse of the eighth chapter of the Gospel of Matthew in the New Testament. This verse continues the miracle story of healing the centurion's servant, the second of a series of miracles in Matthew.

== Content ==
In the original Greek according to Westcott-Hort this verse is:

και γαρ εγω ανθρωπος ειμι υπο εξουσιαν [τασσομενος] εχων υπ εμαυτον
στρατιωτας και λεγω τουτω πορευθητι και πορευεται και αλλω ερχου και
ερχεται και τω δουλω μου ποιησον τουτο και ποιει

In the King James Version of the Bible the text reads:

For I am a man under authority, having soldiers under me:
and I say to this man, Go, and he goeth; and to another, Come,
and he cometh; and to my servant, Do this, and he doeth it.

The New International Version translates the passage as:

For I myself am a man under authority, with soldiers under me.
I tell this one, 'Go,' and he goes; and that one, 'Come,'
and he comes. I say to my servant, 'Do this,' and he does it."

For a collection of other versions see BibleHub Matthew 8:9.

== Analysis ==
This verse is almost identical to Luke 7:8 with only one word spelt differently.

In this verse the Centurion lists examples for how readily his orders are obeyed. The meaning of this verse is not explicit in either Matthew or Luke. One interpretation is that if even a junior officer can have the men under him obey his orders then Jesus with no authority above him can perform great miracles. The alternative is that as the Centurion's power derives from his place in the military ranks so do does Jesus power derive from place in the spiritual hierarchy. The opening of the verse can be translated as "I too am a man under authority" making that parallel between the Jesus and the Centurion more explicit. This interpretation that does not meet later Christology may explain why the Codex Sinaiticus has an altered version of this verse where the Centurion states that he is a "man who has authority." A scribe may have incorrectly copied the text to any confusion.

The words of the Centurion are obeyed by his subordinates so he merely needs to speak for action to happen. This is the same with Jesus who merely needs to speak to bring about miracles. The verse may imply that like with the Centurion Jesus' miracle will involve those below him performing the act, either his disciples or angels. The notion of the disciples performing miracles under Jesus' delegated authority does appear at Matthew 10:8 and 10:40.

== Commentary from the Church Fathers ==
Pseudo-Chrysostom: He knew that Angels stood by unseen to minister to Him, who turn every word of his into act; yea and should Angels fail, yet diseases are healed by His life-giving command.

Hilary of Poitiers: Also he therefore says that it needed only a word to heal his son, because all the salvation of the Gentiles is of faith, and the life of them all is in the precepts of the Lord; therefore he continues saying, For I am a man set under authority, having soldiers under me; and I say to this man, Go, and he goeth; to another, Come, and he cometh; and to my servant, Do this, and he doeth it.

Pseudo-Chrysostom: He has here developed the mystery of the Father and the Son, by the secret suggestion of the Holy Spirit; as much as to say, Though I am under the command of another, yet have I power to command those who are under me; so also Thou, though under the command of the Father, in so far as Thou art Man, yet hast Thou power over the Angels. But Sabellius perhaps affirms, seeking to prove that the Son is the same as the Father, that it is to be understood thus; ‘If I who am set under authority have yet power to command, how much more Thou who art under the authority of none.’ But the words will not bear this exposition; for he said not, ‘If I being a man under authority,’ but, ‘For I also am a man set under authority;’ clearly not drawing a distinction, but pointing to a resemblance in this respect between himself and Christ.

Augustine: If I who am under command have yet power to command others, how much more Thou whom all powers serve!

Glossa Ordinaria: Thou art able without Thy bodily presence, by the ministry of Thy Angels, to say to this disease, Go, and it will leave him; and to say to health, Come, and it shall come to him.

Haymo of Halberstadt: Or, we may understand by those that are set under the centurion, the natural virtues in which many of the Gentiles were mighty, or even thoughts good and bad. Let us say to the bad, Depart, and they will depart; let us call the good, and they shall come; and our servant, that is, our body, let us bid that it submit itself to the Divine will.

Augustine: What is here said seems to disagree with Luke's account, When the centurion heard concerning Jesus, he sent unto him elders of the Jews, beseeching him that he would come and heal his servant. (Luke 7:3.) And again, When he was come nigh to the house, the centurion sent friends unto him, saying, Lord, trouble not thyself, for I am not worthy that thou shouldest enter under my roof.

Chrysostom: But some say that these are two different occurrences; an opinion which has much to support it. Of Him in Luke it is said, He loveth our nation, and has built us a synagogue; but of this one Jesus says, I have not found so great faith in Israel; whence it might seem that the other was a Jew. But in my opinion they are both the same person. What Luke relates that he sent to Jesus to come to him, betrays the friendly services of the Jews. We may suppose that when the centurion sought to go to Jesus, he was prevented by the Jews, who offered to go themselves for the purpose of bringing him. But as soon as he was delivered from their importunity, then he sent to say, Do not think that it was from want of respect that I did not come, but because I thought myself unworthy to receive you into my house. When then Matthew relates, that he spoke thus not through friends, but in his own person, it does not contradict Luke's account; for both have only represented the centurion's anxiety, and that he had a right opinion of Christ. And we may suppose that he first sent this message to Him by friends as He approached, and after, when He was come thither, repeated it Himself. But if they are relating different stories, then they do not contradict each other, but supply mutual deficiencies.

Augustine: Matthew therefore intended to state summarily all that passed between the centurion and the Lord, which was indeed done through others, with the view of commending his faith; as the Lord spoke, I have not found so great faith in Israel. Luke, on the other hand, has narrated the whole as it was done, that so we might be obliged to understand in what sense Matthew, who could not err, meant that the centurion himself came to Christ, namely, in a figurative sense through faith.

Chrysostom: For indeed there is no necessary contradiction between Luke's statement, that he had built a synagogue, and this, that he was not an Israelite; for it was quite possible, that one who was not a Jew should have built a synagogue, and should love the nation.

Preceded by Matthew 8:8	Gospel of Matthew; Chapter 8	Succeeded by Matthew 8:10
