= Matthew 8:11 =

- ← 8:10 8:12 →
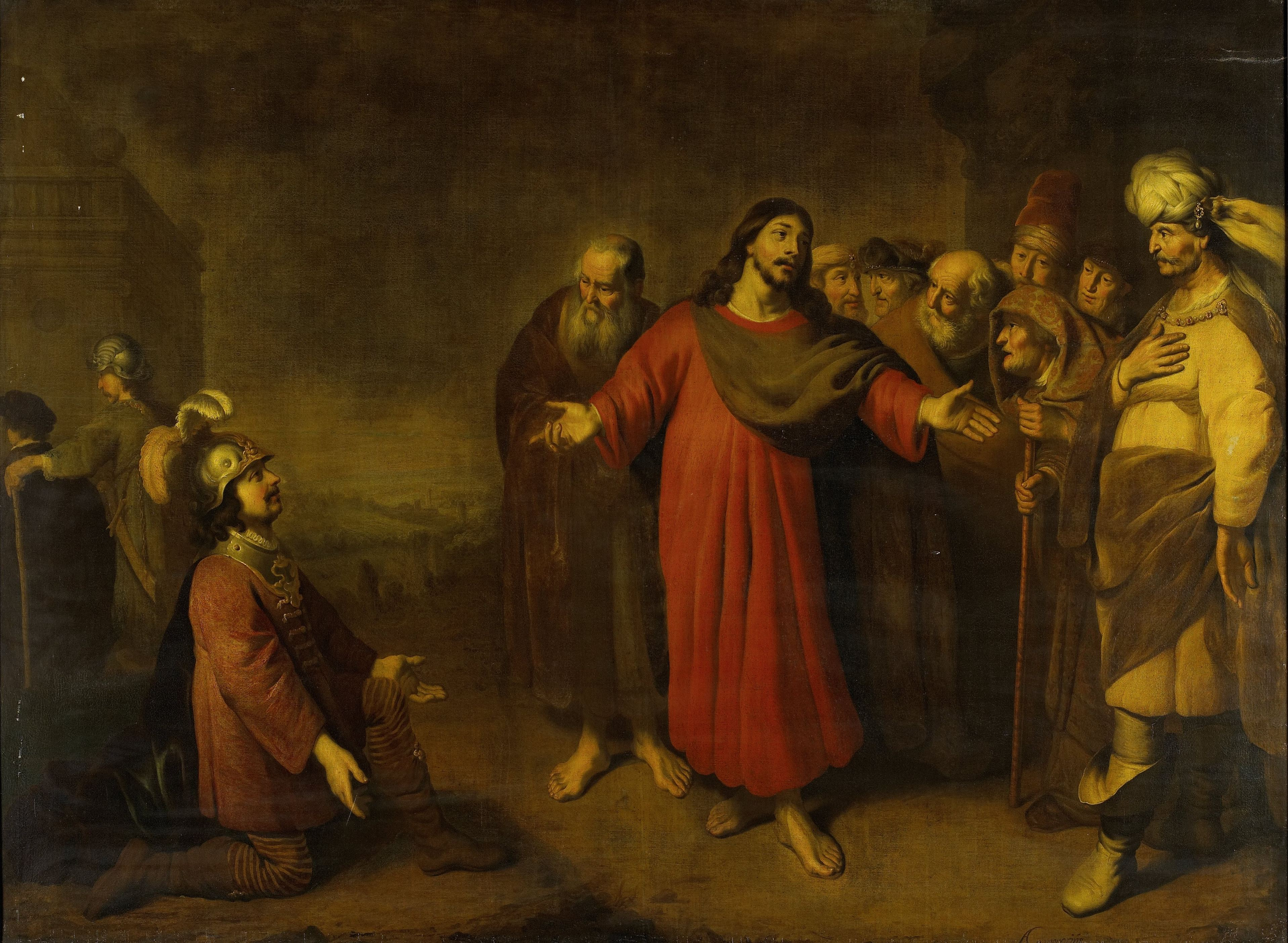
- "Christ and the Centurion of Capernaum", by Adam Camerarius (1644-1665).
- Book: Gospel of Matthew
- Christian Bible part: New Testament

Matthew 8:11 is the eleventh verse of the eighth chapter of the Gospel of Matthew in the New Testament. This verse is part of the miracle story of healing the centurion's servant, the second of a series of miracles in Matthew. After praising the Gentile Centurion's faith in the previous verse in this one Jesus prophesizes that many from around the world will follow him.

== Content ==
In the original Greek according to Westcott-Hort this verse is:

λεγω δε υμιν οτι πολλοι απο ανατολων και δυσμων ηξουσιν και ανακλιθησονται
μετα αβρααμ και ισαακ και ιακωβ εν τη βασιλεια των ουρανων

In the King James Version of the Bible the text reads:

And I say unto you, That many shall come from the east and west, and
shall sit down with Abraham, and Isaac, and Jacob, in the kingdom of heaven.

The New International Version translates the passage as:

I say to you that many will come from the east and the west, and will take their
places at the feast with Abraham, Isaac and Jacob in the kingdom of heaven. (Note: For a collection of other versions see BibleHub Matthew 8:11.)

== Analysis ==
This verse does not appear as part of the Centurion's miracle story in Luke 7. There is a similar passage in Luke 13:28-29 and it is possible the author of Matthew repurposed content from that section to add here.

Keener sees strong evidence that this is an authentic saying of Jesus as it contains Semitic expressions not found in Greek.

The word translated as sit in the KJV and take their place in the NIV literally translates as recline. The Greek and Roman culture was to recline at a formal banquet on couches known as klinai. The word recline in this verse shows the impact of Hellenization on the Palestine of the period. A divine banquet was a frequent metaphor for the afterlife in both Jewish and Greek culture of the period and is a motif that is found on tombstones of the period.

This verse is strongly eschatological predicting what will happen at the end times. A messianic banquet was a frequent concept in Jewish literature of the time. In attendance are three of the patriarchs of Israel Abraham, Isaac and Jacob. What role they are playing at the banquet is not clear, are they the hosts or fellow honoured guests? In Jewish literature of the period there are accounts of meeting one of the patriarchs after death.

That foreigners are coming from east and west to Israel at the end time, making clear that Israel will be the location of the end times. This aligns with the common Jewish belief of the time that Jerusalem would be the centre point of the end of the world. The verse is not clear if these people from the east and west are Gentiles, as contrasted with unfaithful Jews in the next verse. There were many Jews in lands to the east and west and the verse could be referring to them returning to Israel. Sharing a dinner table with a Gentile was in Jesus' time considered ritual defilement. If the foreigners are Gentiles, that the patriarchs themselves are sharing a table with the foreigners shows Jesus' rejection of these rules.

== Commentary from the Church Fathers ==
Jerome: Or perhaps in the person of the centurion the faith of the Gentiles is preferred to that of Israel; whence He proceeds, But I say unto you, Many shall come from the east and from the west.

Augustine: He says, not ‘all,’ I but many; yet these from the east and west; for by these two quarters the whole world is intended.

Haymo of Halberstadt: Or; From the east shall come they, who pass into the kingdom as soon as they are enlightened; from the west they who have suffered persecution for the faith even unto death. Or, he comes from the east, who has served God from a child; he from the west who in decrepit age has turned to God.

Adamantius (Pseudo-Origen): How then does He say in another place, that the chosen are few? Because in each generation there are few that are chosen, but when all are gathered together in the day of visitation they shall be found many. They shall sit down, not the bodily posture, but the spiritual rest, not with human food, but with an eternal feast, teeth Abraham, Isaac, and Jacob, in the kingdom of heaven, where is light, joy, glory, and eternal length of days.

Jerome: Because the God of Abraham, the Maker of heaven, is the Father of Christ, therefore also is Abraham in the kingdom of heaven, and with him will sit down the nations who have believed in Christ the Son of the Creator.

== Notes ==
Preceded by Matthew 8:10	Gospel of Matthew; Chapter 8	Succeeded by Matthew 8:12
