= Matthew 8:14 =

- ← 8:13 8:15 →
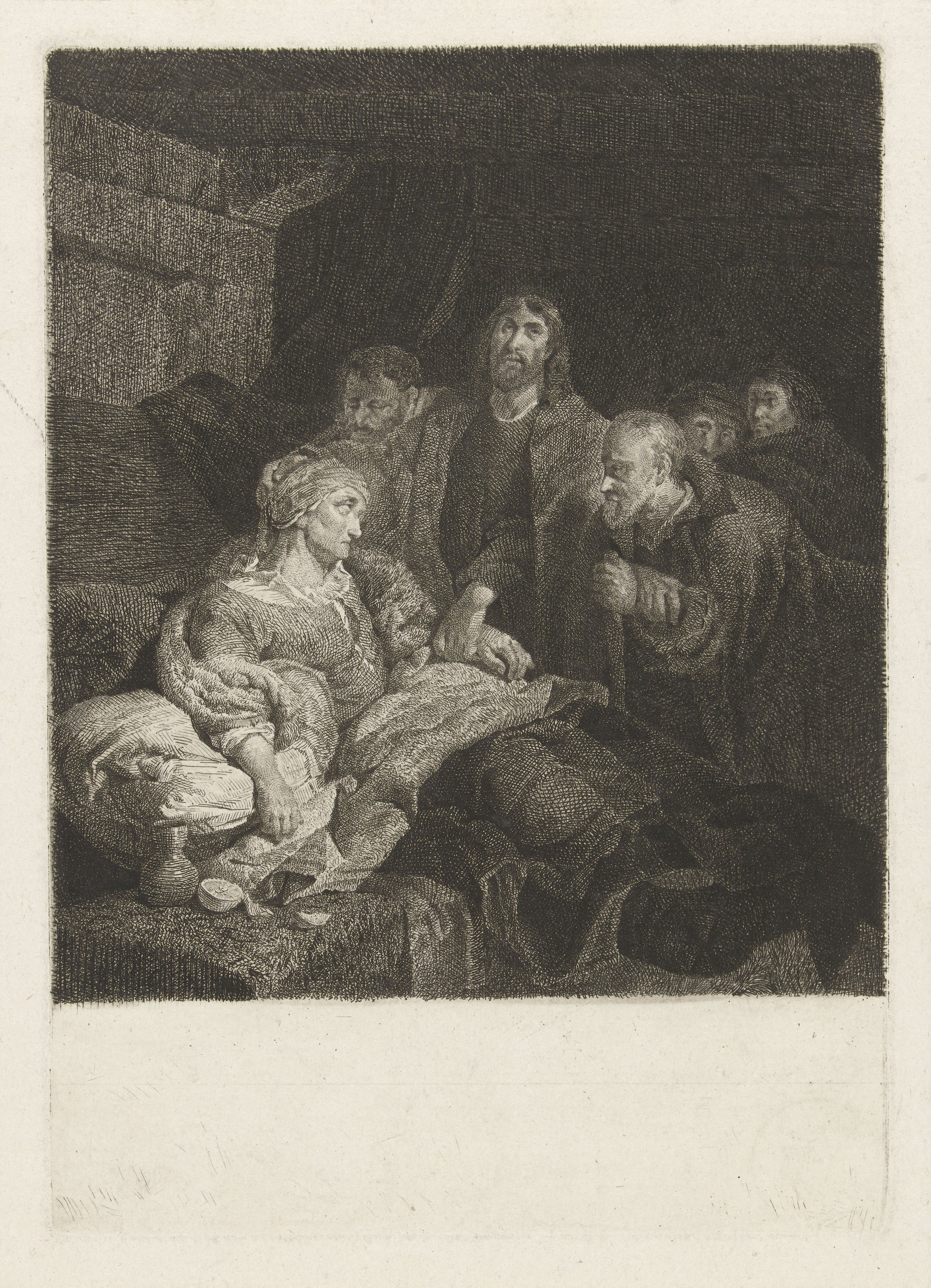
- "Christ heals Peter's mother-in-law", by Joost van Geel (1797).
- Book: Gospel of Matthew
- Christian Bible part: New Testament

Matthew 8:14 is the fourteenth verse of the eighth chapter of the Gospel of Matthew in the New Testament. This verse and the following verse constitute a "simple short story" in which Jesus heals Peter's mother-in-law.

== Content ==
In the original Greek according to Westcott-Hort this verse is:

Καὶ ἐλθὼν ὁ Ἰησοῦς εἰς τὴν οἰκίαν Πέτρου
εἶδεν τὴν πενθερὰν αὐτοῦ βεβλημένην καὶ πυρέσσουσαν

In the King James Version of the Bible the text reads:

And when Jesus was come into Peter's house,
he saw his wife's mother laid, and sick of a fever.

The New International Version translates the passage as:

When Jesus came into Peter's house,
he saw Peter's mother-in-law lying in bed with a fever.

For a collection of other versions see BibleHub Matthew 8:14.

== Analysis ==
This passage clearly indicates that the apostle Peter was married. Cornelius a Lapide notes that "none of the Apostles, except Peter, are spoken of in the Gospels as having a wife". It is said that he left his wife and daughter to follow Jesus.

Ancient commentaries say that "the fever of the soul is the fire of concupiscence, the burning heat of lust, of gluttony, of pride and of envy." Support for this comes from the words of St. Paul, "If they cannot contain, let them marry, for it is better to marry than to burn" (1 Cor 7:9). It is believed this account is related somewhat out of sequence since the other gospels place this account before the Sermon on the Mount. Only Matthew here places it after it.

== Commentary from the Church Fathers ==
Anselm of Canterbury: Matthew having in the leper shown the healing of the whole human race, and in the centurion's servant that of the Gentiles, now figures the healing of the synagogue in Peter's mother-in-law. He relates the case of the servant, first, because it was the greater miracle, and the grace was greater in the conversion of the Gentile; or because the synagogue should not be fully converted till the end of the age when the fulness of the Gentiles should have entered in. (Note: See Conversion of the Jews (future event)) Peter's house was in Bethsaida.

Chrysostom: Why did He enter into Peter's house? I think to take food; for it follows, And she arose, and ministered to them. For He abode with His disciples to do them honour, and to make them more zealous. Observe Peter's reverence towards Christ; though his mother-in-law lay at home sick of a fever, yet he did not force Him thither at once, but waited till His teaching should be completed, and others healed. For from the beginning he was instructed to prefer others to himself. Wherefore he did not even bring Him thither, but Christ went in of Himself; purposing, because the centurion had said, I am not worthy that thou shouldest come under my roof, to show what He granted to a disciple. And He did not scorn to enter the humble hut of a fisherman, instructing us in everything to trample upon human pride. Sometimes He heals by a word, sometimes He reaches forth His hand; as here, He touched her hand, and the fever left her. For He would not always work miracles with display of surpassing power, but would sometimes be hid. By touching her body He not only banished the fever, but restored her to perfect health. Because her sickness was such as art could cure, He showed his power to heal, in doing what medicine could not do, giving her back perfect health and strength at once; which is intimated in what the Evangelist adds, And she arose, and ministered to them.

Jerome: For naturally the greatest weakness follows fever, and the evils of sickness begin to be felt as the patient begins to recover; but that health which is given by the Lord's power is complete at once.

== Notes ==
Preceded by Matthew 8:13	Gospel of Matthew; Chapter 8	Succeeded by Matthew 8:15
