= Matthew 8:10 =

- ← 8:9 8:11 →
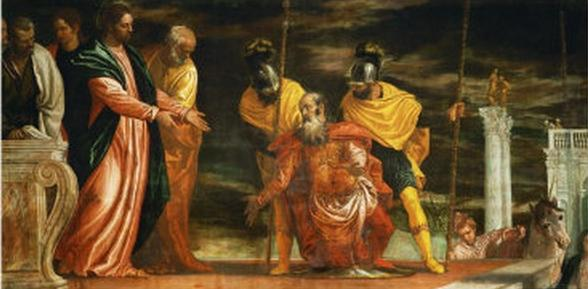
- Paolo Veronese's depiction of 'Jesus healing the servant of a Centurion'
- Book: Gospel of Matthew
- Christian Bible part: New Testament

Matthew 8:10 is the tenth verse of the eighth chapter of the Gospel of Matthew in the New Testament. This verse continues the miracle story of healing the centurion's servant, the second of a series of miracles in Matthew.

== Content ==
In the original Greek according to Westcott-Hort this verse is:

ακουσας δε ο ιησους εθαυμασεν και ειπεν τοις ακολουθουσιν αμην
λεγω υμιν παρ ουδενι τοσαυτην πιστιν εν τω ισραηλ ευρον

In the King James Version of the Bible the text reads:

When Jesus heard it, he marvelled, and said to them that followed,
Verily I say unto you, I have not found so great faith, no, not in Israel.

The New International Version translates the passage as:

When Jesus heard this, he was amazed and said to those following him,
"Truly I tell you, I have not found anyone in Israel with such great faith.

For a collection of other versions see BibleHub Matthew 8:9.

== Analysis ==
A variation of this verse also Luke 7:9 with the same content but many stylistic differences the strengthen the message in Matthew. His edits emphasizes one of Matthew's favourite themes, the unbelief of the Jews compared with the acceptance of Jesus by the Gentiles.

Jesus addresses his remarks to the crowd that has been following him since Matthew 8:1. This is the only time in Matthew where Jesus is amazed by anything, and one of the very mentions of Jesus' emotions in Matthew. The only other time in the gospels that Jesus is amazed is in Mark 6:6 where he is astonished by the unbelief of his hometown.

Israel can either refer to the Jewish people or to the land of Israel. No Kingdom of Israel existed in Jesus' time but it was still a common geographic reference. At this point in Matthew's narrative Jesus has not faced any rejection from the Jewish people. So far the story has been one of success in recruiting disciples and having great crowds come to hear his sermons. In Luke this verse appears after Jesus has encountered some rejection a fits better in that narrative.

πιστιν, translated as faith, is an important concept in the miracle stories of Matthew. The word makes its first of many appearances in Matthew in this verse. Throughout the Gospel miracles occur as a result of the strong faith in Jesus. When Jesus meets someone with great faith, even a Gentile, he will perform miraculous acts on their behalf.

== Commentary from the Church Fathers ==
Chrysostom: As what the leper had affirmed concerning Christ's power, If thou will, thou canst cleanse me, was confirmed by the mouth of Christ, saying, I will, be thou clean; so here He did not blame the centurion for bearing testimony to Christ's authority, but even commended him. Nay more; it is something greater than commendation that the Evangelist signifies in the words, But Jesus hearing marvelled.

Adamantius (Pseudo-Origen): Observe how great and what that is at which God the Only-begotten marvels! Gold, riches, principalities, are in His sight as the shadow or the flower that fadeth; in the sight of God none of these things is wonderful, as though it were great or precious, but faith only; this He wonders at, and pays honour to, this He esteems acceptable to Himself.

Augustine: But who was He that had created this faith in him, but only He who now marvelled at it? But even had it come from any other, how should He marvel who knew all things future? When the Lord marvels, it is only to teach us what we ought to wonder at; for all these emotions in Him are not signs of passion, but examples of a teacher.

Chrysostom: Wherefore He is said to have thus wondered in the presence of all the people, giving them an example that they also should wonder at Him; for it follows, And he said to them that followed, I have not found so great faith in Israel.

Augustine: He praises his faith, but gives no command to quit his profession of a soldier.

Jerome: This He speaks of the present generation, not of all the Patriarchs and Prophets of past ages.

Pseudo-Chrysostom: Andrew believed, but it was after John had said, Behold the Lamb of God; (John 1:36.) Peter believed, but it was at the preaching of Andrew; Philip believed, but it was by reading the Scriptures; and Nathanael first received a proof of His Divinity, and then spoke forth his confession of faith.

Adamantius (Pseudo-Origen): Jairus a prince in Israel, making request for his daughter, said not, ‘speak the word,’ but, ‘Come quickly.’ Nicodemus, hearing of the sacrament of faith, asks, How can these things be? (John 3:9.) Mary and Martha say, Lord, if thou hadst been here, my brother had not died; (John 11:21.) as though distrusting that God's power could be in all places at the same time.

Pseudo-Chrysostom: Or, if we would suppose that his faith was greater than even that of the Apostles, Christ's testimony to it must be understood as though every good in a man should be commended relatively to his character; as it were a great thing in a countryman to speak with wisdom, but in a philosopher the same would be nothing wonderful. In this way it may be said of the centurion, In none other have I found so great faith in Israel.

Chrysostom: For it is a different thing for a Jew to believe and for a Gentile.

| Preceded by Matthew 8:9 | Gospel of Matthew; Chapter 8 | Succeeded by Matthew 8:11 |
