= Matthew 8:13 =

- ← 8:12 8:14 →
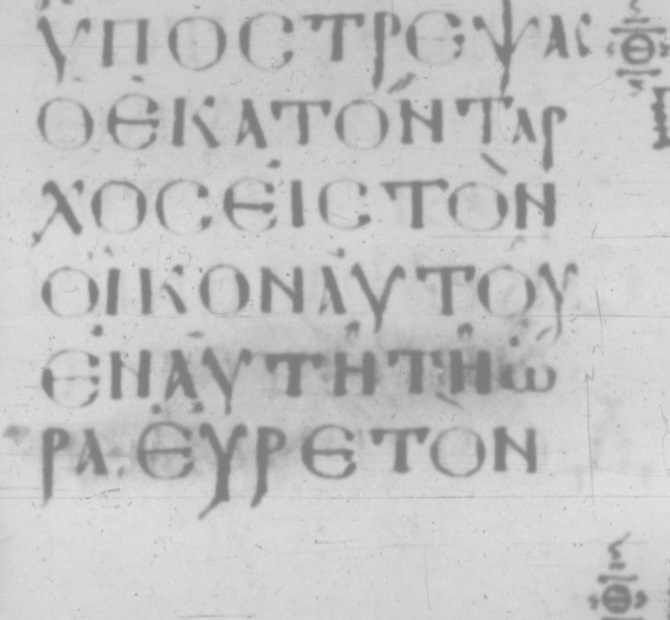
- Matthew 8:13 in Codex Nanianus (9th century).
- Book: Gospel of Matthew
- Christian Bible part: New Testament

Matthew 8:13 is the thirteenth verse of the eighth chapter of the Gospel of Matthew in the New Testament. This verse is the conclusion to the miracle story of healing the centurion's servant, the second of a series of miracles in Matthew.

== Content ==
In the original Greek according to Westcott-Hort this verse is:

και ειπεν ο ιησους τω εκατονταρχη υπαγε ως επιστευσας
γενηθητω σοι και ιαθη ο παις εν τη ωρα εκεινη

In the King James Version of the Bible the text reads:

And Jesus said unto the centurion, Go thy way; and as thou hast believed,
so be it done unto thee. And his servant was healed in the selfsame hour.

The New International Version translates the passage as:

Then Jesus said to the centurion, "Go! Let it be done just
as you believed it would." And his servant was healed at that moment.

For a collection of other versions see BibleHub Matthew 8:13.

== Analysis ==
This verse is very different from the final verse of this same miracle story at Luke 7:10. Luke has the men return to find the servant healed while Matthew has Jesus performing the miracle itself. The verses are different enough that Davies and Allison believe there is no way to reconstruct what the original ending to the Centurion story would have been in Q.

The healing used similar language as Matthew 8:3 and Matthew 9:6.

== Commentary from the Church Fathers ==
Chrysostom: But that none might suppose that these were nothing more than fair words, He makes them credible by the miracles following, And Jesus said to the centurion, Go, and be it done to thee as thou hast believed.

Rabanus Maurus: As though He had said, According to the measure of thy faith, so be thy grace. For the merit of the Lord may be communicated even to servants not only through the merit of their faith, but through their obedience to rule. It follows, And his servant was healed in the self-same hour.

Chrysostom: Wherein admire the speediness, showing Christ's power, not only to heal, but to do it in a moment of time.

Augustine: As the Lord did not enter the centurion's house with His body, but healed the servant, present in majesty, but absent in body; so He went among the Jews only in the body, but among other nations He was neither born of a Virgin, nor suffered, nor endured human sufferings, nor did divine wonders; and yet was fulfilled that which was spoken, A people that I have not known hath served me, and hath obeyed me by the hearing of the ear. (Ps. 18:43.) The Jews beheld, yet crucified Him; the world heard, and believed.

Preceded by Matthew 8:12	Gospel of Matthew; Chapter 8	Succeeded by Matthew 8:14
