= Matthew 8:8 =

- ← 8:7 8:9 →
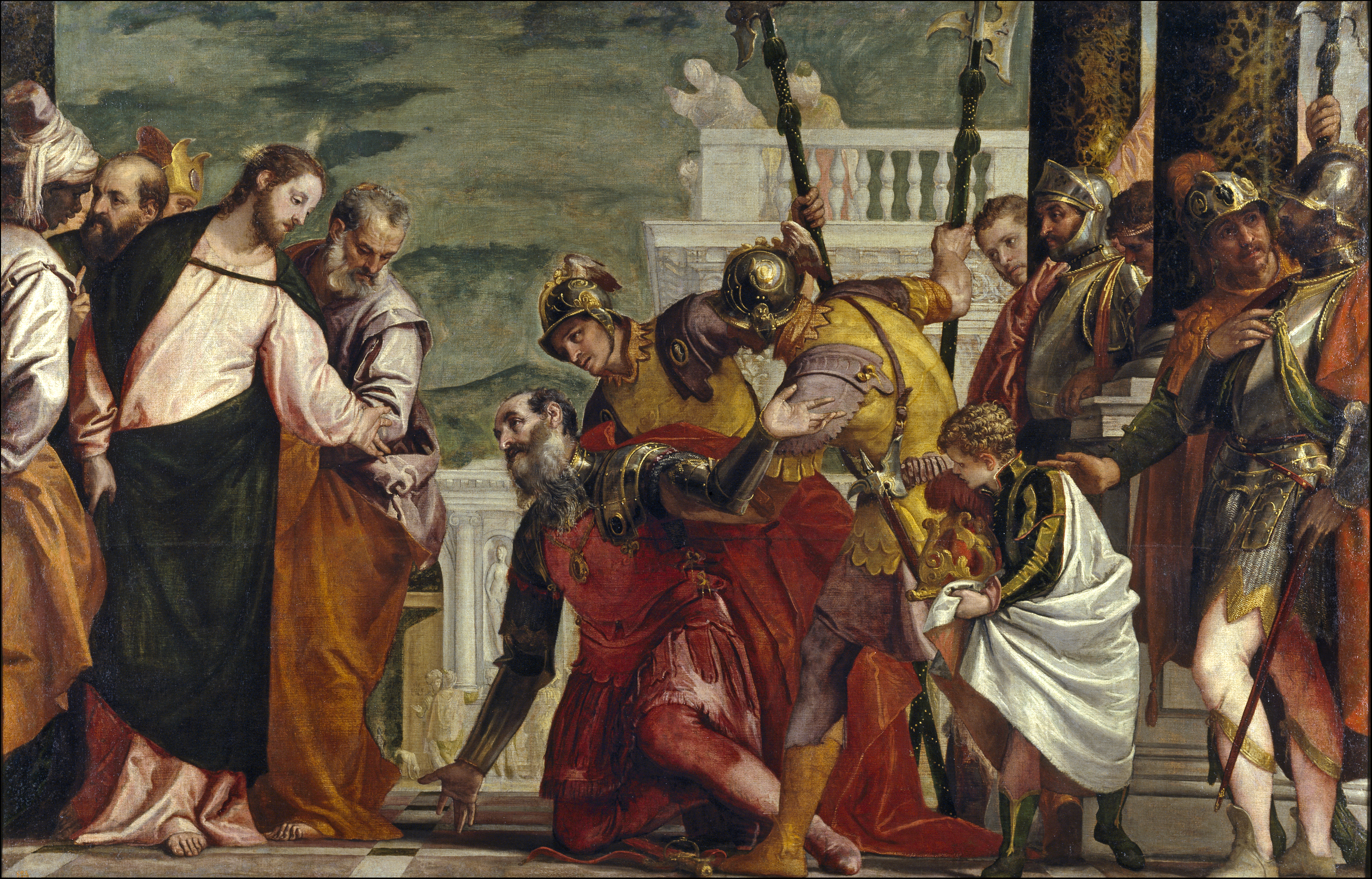
- Paolo Veronese's Renaissance depiction of Jesus and the Centurion
- Book: Gospel of Matthew
- Christian Bible part: New Testament

Matthew 8:8 is the eighth verse of the eighth chapter of the Gospel of Matthew in the New Testament. This verse continues the miracle story of healing the centurion's servant, the second of a series of miracles in Matthew.

== Content ==
In the original Greek according to Westcott-Hort this verse is:

αποκριθεις δε ο εκατονταρχος εφη κυριε ουκ ειμι ικανος ινα
μου υπο την στεγην εισελθης αλλα μονον ειπε
λογω και ιαθησεται ο παις μου

In the King James Version of the Bible the text reads:

The centurion answered and said, Lord, I am not worthy
that thou shouldest come under my roof: but speak the
word only, and my servant shall be healed.

The New International Version translates the passage as:

The centurion replied, "Lord, I do not deserve to
have you come under my roof. But just say the word,
and my servant will be healed.

== Analysis ==
This verse is closely paralleled at Luke 7:6, but Matthew drops the extra complication of the Centurion first sending friends to talk to Jesus.

The Centurion clearly acknowledges his subordinate position to Jesus, though the term translated as Lord does not necessitate the Centurion recognize Jesus as divine.

The concern about entering the house could be related to prohibitions on Jews entering the homes of Gentiles, but the gospel writer makes no mention of this. It is more likely the offer not to have to travel is an example of the supplication of the Centurion and the great power of Jesus.

Miracles at a distance were considered to be more difficult in contemporary writings of the time. This is the first mention in the Gospel of Jesus having this ability.

== Commentary from the Church Fathers ==
Jerome: As we commend the centurion's faith in that he believed that the Saviour was able to heal the paralytic; so his humility is seen in his professing himself unworthy that the Lord should come under his roof; as it follows, And the centurion answered and said into him, Lord, I am not worthy that thou shouldest come under my roof.

Rabanus Maurus: Conscious of his gentile life, he thought he should be more burdened than profited by this act of condescension from Him with whose faith he was indeed endued, but with whose sacraments he was not yet initiated.

Augustine: By declaring himself unworthy, he showed himself worthy, not indeed into whose house, but into whose heart, Christ the Word of God should enter. Nor could he have said this with so much faith and humility, had he not borne in his heart Him whom he feared to have in his house. And indeed it would have been no great blessedness that Jesus should enter within his walls, if He had not already entered into his heart.

Peter Chrysologus: Mystically, his house was the body which contained his soul, which contains within it the freedom of the mind by a heavenly vision. But God disdains neither to inhabit flesh, nor to enter the roof of our body.

Adamantius (Pseudo-Origen): And now also when the heads of Churches, holy men and acceptable to God, enter your roof, then in them the Lord also enters, and do you think of yourself as receiving the Lord. And when you eat and drink the Lord's Bodya, then the Lord enters under your roof, and you then should humble yourself, saying, Lord, I am not worthy. For where He enters unworthily, there He enters to the condemnation of him who receives Him.

Jerome: The thoughtfulness of the centurion appears herein, that he saw the Divinity hidden beneath the covering of body; wherefore he adds, But speak the word only, and my servant will be healed.

Preceded by Matthew 8:7	Gospel of Matthew; Chapter 8	Succeeded by Matthew 8:9
