= Matthew 8:15 =

- ← 8:14 8:16 →
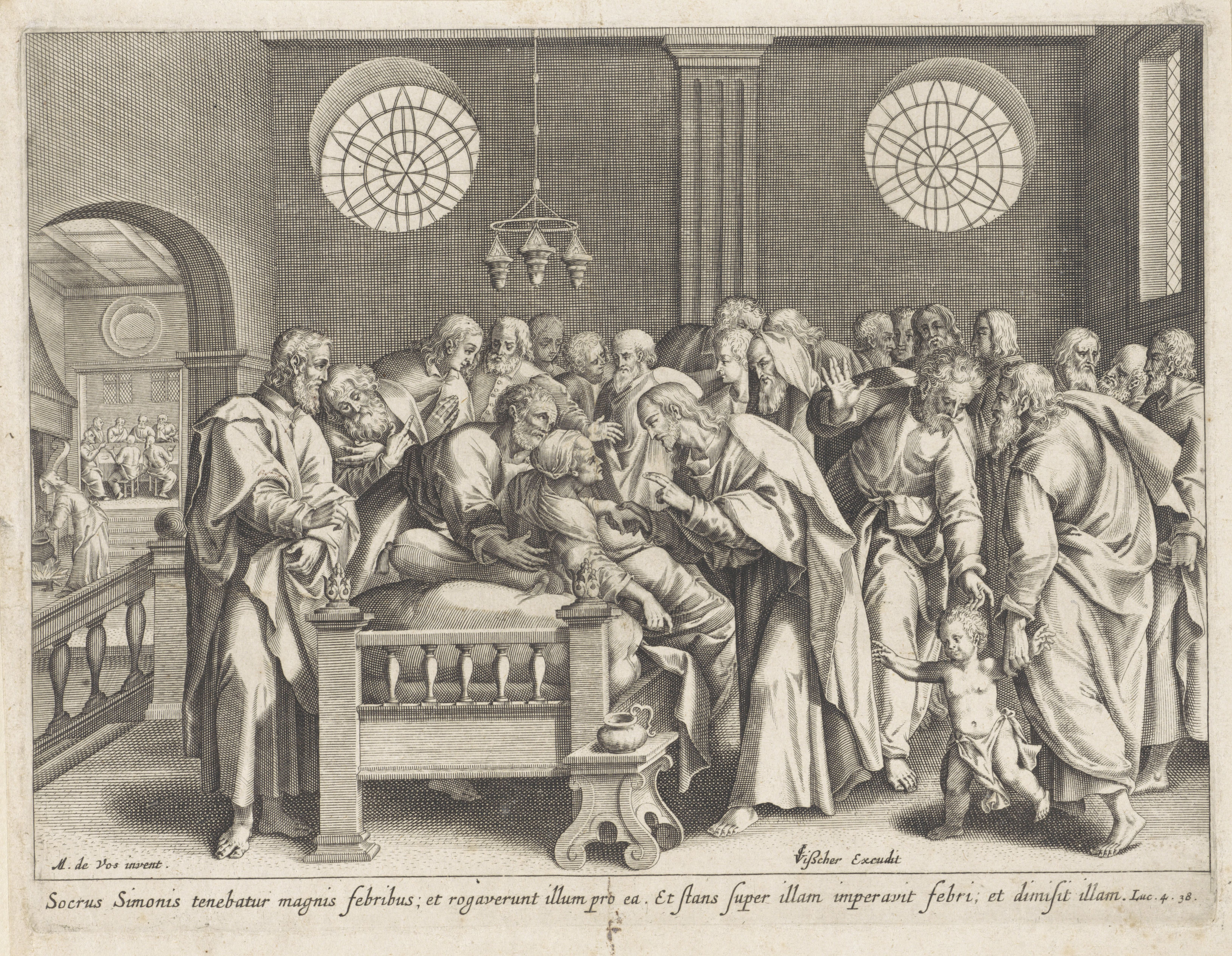
- "Christ heals Peter's mother-in-law". Claes Jansz. Visscher (II), Amsterdam (c. 1601-1652).
- Book: Gospel of Matthew
- Christian Bible part: New Testament

Matthew 8:15 is the fifteenth verse in the eighth chapter of the Gospel of Matthew in the New Testament which relates the Healing the mother of Peter's wife.

== Content ==
In the original Greek according to Westcott-Hort this verse is:

καὶ ἥψατο τῆς χειρὸς αὐτῆς, καὶ ἀφῆκεν αὐτὴν ὁ πυρετός· καὶ ἠγέρθη, καὶ διηκόνει αὐτοῖς.

In the King James Version of the Bible the text reads:

And he touched her hand, and the fever left her: and she arose, and ministered unto them.

The New International Version translates the passage as:

He touched her hand and the fever left her, and she got up and began to wait on him.

For a collection of other versions see BibleHub Matthew 8:15.

== Analysis ==
The accounts in the other gospels are quite similar: "He took her by the hand" (Mark 1:31), "standing over her" (Luke 4:39). The miracle is notable because she recovered so quickly, unlike most people who upon recovering from an illness are quite weak.

== Commentary from the Church Fathers ==
Glossa Ordinaria: "And it is not enough that she is cured, but strength is given her besides, for she arose and ministered unto them."

Chrysostom: "This, she arose and ministered unto them, shows at once the Lord’s power, and the woman’s feeling towards Christ."

Bede: "Figuratively; Peter’s house is the Law, or the circumcision, his mother-in-law the synagogue, which is as it were the mother of the Church committed to Peter. She is in a fever, that is, she is sick of zealous hate, and persecutes the Church. The Lord touches her hand, when He turns her carnal works to spiritual uses."

Saint Remigius: "Or by Peter’s mother-in-law may be understood the Law, which according to the Apostle was made weak through the flesh, i. e. the carnal understanding. But when the Lord through the mystery of the Incarnation appeared visibly in the synagogue, and fulfilled the Law in action, and taught that it was to be understood spiritually; straightway it thus allied with the grace of the Gospel received such strength, that what had been the minister of death and punishment, became the minister of life and glory."

Rabanus Maurus: "Or, every soul that struggles with fleshly lusts is sick of a fever, but touched with the hand of Divine mercy, it recovers health, and restrains the concupiscence of the flesh by the bridle of continence, and with those limbs with which it had served uncleanness, it now ministers to righteousness."

Hilary of Poitiers: "Or; In Peter’s wife’s mother is shown the sickly condition of infidelity, to which freedom of will is near akin, being united by the bonds as it were of wedlock. By the Lord’s entrance into Peter’s house, that is into the body, unbelief is cured, which was before sick of the fever of sin, and ministers in duties of righteousness to the Saviour."

Augustine: "When this miracle was done, that is, after what, or before what, Matthew has not said. For we need not understand that it took place just after that which it follows in the relation; he may be returning here to what he had omitted above. For Mark relates this after the cleansing of the leper, (Mark 1:30.) which should seem to follow the sermon on the mount, concerning which Mark is silent. Luke also follows the same order in relating this concerning Peter’s mother-in-law as Mark; also inserting it before that long sermon which seems to be the same with Matthew’s sermon on the mount. But what matters it in what order the events are told, whether something omitted before is brought in after, or what was done after is told earlier, so long as in the same story he does not contradict either another or himself? For as it is in no man’s power to choose in what order he shall recollect the things he has once known, it is likely enough that each of the Evangelists thought himself obliged to relate all in that order in which it pleased God to bring to his memory the various events. Therefore when the order of time is not clear, it cannot import to us what order of relation any one of them may have followed."

Preceded by Matthew 8:14	Gospel of Matthew; Chapter 8	Succeeded by Matthew 8:16
