= Matthew 8:17 =

- ← 8:16 8:18 →
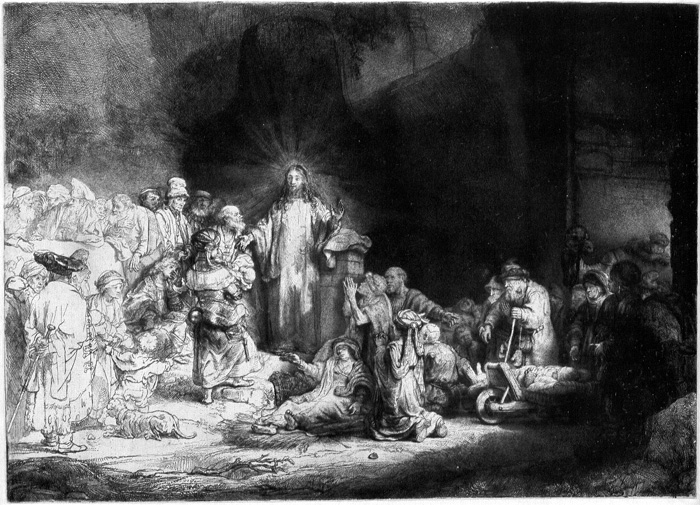
- "Christ Healing the Sick", by Rembrandt (c. 1646-1650).
- Book: Gospel of Matthew
- Christian Bible part: New Testament

Matthew 8:17 is the 17th verse in the eighth chapter of the Gospel of Matthew in the New Testament.

== Content ==
In the original Greek according to Westcott-Hort this verse is:

ὅπως πληρωθῇ τὸ ῥηθὲν διὰ Ἠσαΐου τοῦ προφήτου, λέγοντος, Αὐτὸς τὰς ἀσθενείας ἡμῶν ἔλαβε, καὶ τὰς νόσους ἐβάστασεν.

In the King James Version of the Bible the text reads:

That it might be fulfilled which was spoken by Esaias the prophet, saying, Himself took our infirmities, and bare our sicknesses.

The New International Version translates the passage as:

This was to fulfill what was spoken through the prophet Isaiah: "He took up our infirmities and carried our diseases."

For a collection of other versions see BibleHub Matthew 8:17.

== Analysis ==
This reference is from Isaiah 53:4, which, according to Lapide has a twofold meaning. The first is in regard to sins and their penalty, i.e. the diseases of the soul. This Christ took upon Himself, and abolished on the cross which is implied in the words "he carried." The second speaks of the diseases of the body, which were thought to spring from diseases of the soul. These Christ also bore, by being compassionate and healing the infirmities of the people.

== Commentary from the Church Fathers ==
Chrysostom: "Observe how great a multitude of cured the Evangelist here runs through, not relating the case of each, but in one word introducing an innumerable flood of miracles. That the greatness of the miracle should not raise unbelief that so much people and so various diseases could be healed in so short a space, he brings forward the Prophet to bear witness to the things that were done, That it might be fulfilled which was spoken by Esaias the Prophet, saying, Himself took our infirmities."

Rabanus Maurus: "Took them not that He should have them Himself, but that He should take them away from us; and bare our sicknesses, in that what we were too weak to bear. He should bear for us."

Saint Remigius: "He took the infirmity of human nature so as to make us strong who had before been weak."

Hilary of Poitiers: "And by the passion of His body, according to the words of the Prophet, He absorbed all the infirmities of human weakness."

Chrysostom: "The Prophet seems to have meant this of sins; how then does the Evangelist explain it of bodily diseases? It should be understood, that either he cites the text literally, or he intends to inculcate that most of our bodily diseases have their origin in sins of the soul; for death itself has its root in sin."

Jerome: "all the sick were healed not in the morning nor at noon, but rather about sunset; as a corn of wheat dies in the ground that it may bring forth much fruit."

Rabanus Maurus: "Sunset shadows forth the passion and death of Him Who said, While I am in the world, I am the light of the world. (John 9:5.) Who while He lived temporally in the flesh, taught only a few of the Jews; but having trodden under foot the kingdom of death, promised the gifts of faith to all the Gentiles throughout the world."

Preceded by Matthew 8:16	Gospel of Matthew; Chapter 8	Succeeded by Matthew 8:18
