= Matthew 8:18 =

- ← 8:17 8:19 →
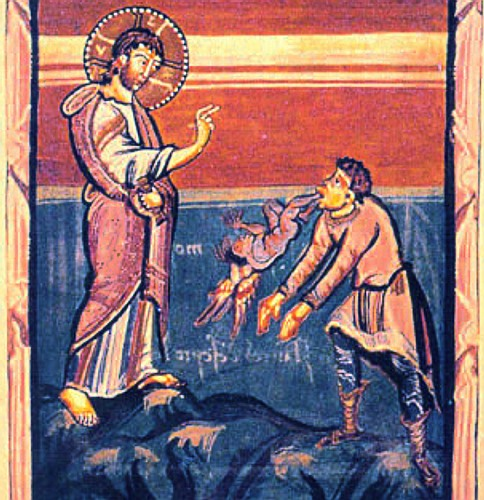
- A mediæval illustration of "Jesus healing the possessed person", Hidta-Codex.
- Book: Gospel of Matthew
- Christian Bible part: New Testament

Matthew 8:18 is the 18th verse in the eighth chapter of the Gospel of Matthew in the New Testament.

== Content ==
In the original Greek according to Westcott-Hort this verse is:

Ἰδὼν δὲ ὁ Ἰησοῦς πολλοὺς ὄχλους περὶ αὐτόν, ἐκέλευσεν ἀπελθεῖν εἰς τὸ πέραν.

In the King James Version of the Bible the text reads:

Now when Jesus saw great multitudes about him, he gave commandment to depart unto the other side.

The New International Version translates the passage as:

When Jesus saw the crowd around him, he gave orders to cross to the other side of the lake.

For a collection of other versions see BibleHub Matthew 8:18.

== Analysis ==
Irish Archbishop John MacEvilly believes that Christ wished to avoid the crowds, which His miraculous cures had attracted, in order to give an example of disregarding human praise. The same account is mentioned in Mark 1:35 and Luke 4:42.

== Commentary from the Church Fathers ==
Chrysostom: "Because Christ not only healed the body, but purified the soul also, He desired to show forth true wisdom, not only by curing diseases, but by doing nothing with ostentation; and therefore it is said, Now when Jesus saw great multitudes about him, he commanded his disciples to cross over to the other side. This He did at once teaching us to be lowly, softening the ill-will of the Jews, and teaching us to do nothing with ostentation."

Saint Remigius: "Or; He did this as one desiring to shun the thronging of the multitude. But they hung upon Him in admiration, crowding to see Him. For who would depart from one who did such miracles? Who would not wish to look upon His open face, to see His mouth that spoke such things? For if Moses’ countenance was made glorious, and Stephen's as that of an Angel, gather from this how it was to have been supposed that their common Lord must have then appeared; of whom the Prophet speaks, Thy form is fair above the sons of men. (Ps. 45:2.)"

Hilary of Poitiers: "The name disciples is not to be supposed to be confined to the twelve Apostles; for we read of many disciples besides the twelve."

Augustine: "It is clear that this day on which they went over the lake was another day, and not that which followed the one on which Peter’s mother-in-law was healed, on which day Mark and Luke relate that He went out into the desert."

Chrysostom: "Observe that He does not dismiss the multitudes, that He may not offend them. He did say to them, Depart ye, but bade His disciples go away from thence, thus the crowds might hope to be able to follow."

Saint Remigius: "What happened between the command of the Lord given, and their crossing over, the Evangelist purposes to relate in what follows; And one of the Scribes came to him and said, Master, I will follow thee whithersoever thou goest".

Preceded by Matthew 8:17	Gospel of Matthew; Chapter 8	Succeeded by Matthew 8:19
