= Matthew 8:20 =

- ← 8:19 8:21 →
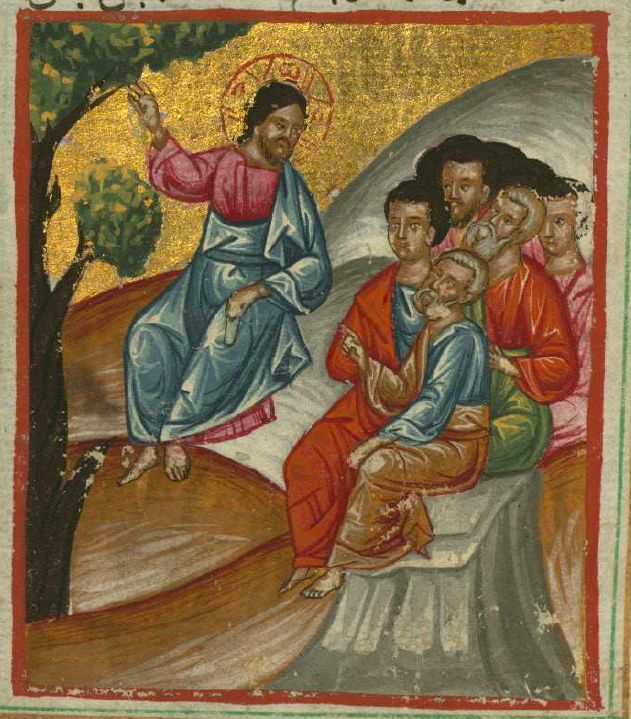
- "Jesus teaching his disciples". From a 1684 Arabic manuscript of the Gospels.
- Book: Gospel of Matthew
- Christian Bible part: New Testament

Matthew 8:20 is the 20th verse in the eighth chapter of the Gospel of Matthew in the New Testament of the Christian Bible. It reveals the homelessness of Jesus and his followers.

== Content ==
In the original Greek according to Westcott-Hort this verse is:

Καὶ λέγει αὐτῷ ὁ Ἰησοῦς, Αἱ ἀλώπεκες φωλεοὺς ἔχουσι, καὶ τὰ πετεινὰ τοῦ οὐρανοῦ κατασκηνώσεις· ὁ δὲ υἱὸς τοῦ ἀνθρώπου οὐκ ἔχει ποῦ τὴν κεφαλὴν κλίνῃ.

In the King James Version of the Bible the text reads:

And Jesus saith unto him, The foxes have holes, and the birds of the air have nests; but the Son of man hath not where to lay his head.

The New International Version translates the passage as:

Jesus replied, "Foxes have holes and birds of the air have nests, but the Son of Man has no place to lay his head."

For a collection of other versions see BibleHub Matthew 8:20.

== Analysis ==
Jesus makes it plain to the inquiring man that worldly honours and riches were not to be expected. MacEvilly notes on the examples, that 1) "foxes" are generally hunted down, and 2) birds take no care for their provisions. A movement in the early church called Apostolic concluded from this passage that absolute poverty was required for salvation. This movement was labelled heretical. Many monks and nuns are required to take vows of poverty (see: Religious vows) even though they collectively may possess property and wealth.

Why Christ uses the title "Son of Man" rather than "Son of God" is open to dispute. Lapide notes that some believe that he was born from the seed of Joseph, not the Holy Spirit, contrary to the New Testament witness. Others think that man is used in a gender-neutral sense and thus refers to the Virgin Mary. Some think it is because he is from the line of David, Abraham and the other men listed in his genealogy in Matthew 1. Some believe that because he is, in a sense, a son of Adam, which in Hebrew means man. However, among Christian scholars the consensus is that it is a reference to Daniel 7:13-14, and is thus a claim to divinity. This is supported by the fact that it is Jesus' self reference to this verse before Caiaphas, the high priest, that results in the charge of blasphemy.

== Church Father commentary ==
Chrysostom: "So Christ answers him not so much to what he had said, but to the obvious purpose of his mind. Jesus saith unto him, The foxes have holes, and the birds of the air have nests, but the Son of man hath not where to lay his head; as though He had said;"

Jerome: "Why do you seek to follow Me for the sake of the riches and gain of this world, when My poverty is such that I have neither lodging nor home of My own?"

Chrysostom: "This was not to send him away, but rather to convict him of evil intentions; at the same time permitting him if he would to follow Christ with the expectation of poverty."

Augustine: "Otherwise; The Son of man hath not where to lay his head; that is, in your faith. The foxes have holes, in your heart, because you are deceitful. The birds of the air have nests, in your heart, because you are proud. Deceitful and proud follow Me not; for how should guile follow sincerity?"

Gregory the Great: "Otherwise; The fox is a crafty animal, lying hid in ditches and dens, and when it comes abroad never going in a straight path, but in crooked windings; birds raise themselves in the air. By the foxes then are meant the subtle and deceitful dæmons, by the birds the proud dæmons; as though He had said; Deceitful and proud dæmons have their abode in your heart; but my lowliness finds no rest in a proud spirit."

Augustine: "He was moved to follow Christ because of the miracles; this vain desire of glory is signified by the birds; but he assumed the submissiveness of a disciple, which deceit is signified by the foxes.

Rabanus Maurus: "Heretics confiding in their art are signified by the foxes, the evil spirits by the birds of the air, who have their holes and their nests, that is, their abodes in the heart of the Jewish people. Another of his disciples saith unto him, Lord, suffer me first to go and bury my father."

Preceded by Matthew 8:19	Gospel of Matthew; Chapter 8	Succeeded by Matthew 8:21
