= Matthew 8:16 =

- ← 8:15 8:17 →
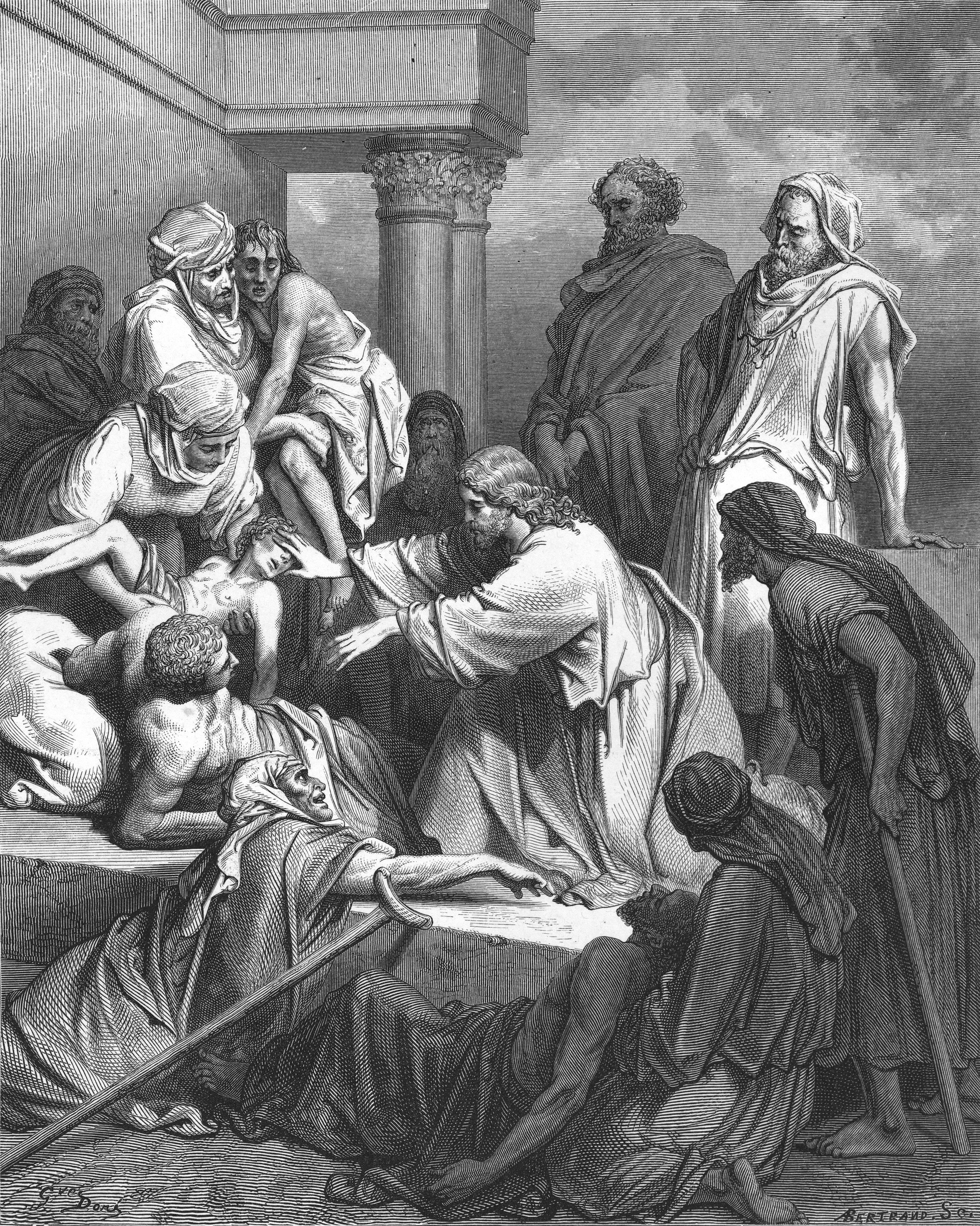
- "Jesus healing the sick", by Gustave Dore (19th century).
- Book: Gospel of Matthew
- Christian Bible part: New Testament

Matthew 8:16 is the 16th verse in the eighth chapter of the Gospel of Matthew in the New Testament which relates Jesus exorcising at sunset.

== Content ==
In the original Greek according to Westcott-Hort this verse is:

Ὀψίας δὲ γενομένης προσήνεγκαν αὐτῷ δαιμονιζομένους πολλούς· καὶ ἐξέβαλε τὰ πνεύματα λόγῳ, καὶ πάντας τοὺς κακῶς ἔχοντας ἐθεράπευσεν·

In the King James Version of the Bible the text reads:

When the even was come, they brought unto him many that were possessed with devils: and he cast out the spirits with his word, and healed all that were sick:

The New International Version translates the passage as:

When evening came, many who were demon-possessed were brought to him, and he drove out the spirits with a word and healed all the sick.

For a collection of other versions see BibleHub Matthew 8:16.

== Analysis ==
MacEvilly draws a comparison between St. Peter's house and the Church saying, "How many spiritual cures have been performed, even to the present day, in Peter's house, which is God's holy Church." He also believes that the late hour of the day is mentioned to convey that Jesus was never inconvenienced, but did good "whenever an opportunity presented itself."

== Commentary from the Church Fathers ==
Chrysostom: "Because the multitude of believers was now very great, they would not depart from Christ, though time pressed; but in the evening they bring unto Him the sick. When it was evening, they brought unto him many that had dœmons."

Augustine: "The words, Now when it was evening, show that the evening of the same day is meant. This would not have been implied, had it been only when it was evening."

Saint Remigius: "Christ the Son of God, the Author of human salvation, the fount and source of all goodness, furnished heavenly medicine, He cast out the spirits with a word, and healed all that were sick. Dæmons and diseases He sent away with a word, that by these signs, and mighty works, He might show that He was come for the salvation of the human race."

Preceded by Matthew 8:15	Gospel of Matthew; Chapter 8	Succeeded by Matthew 8:17
