= Haimo of Auxerre =

Haimo of Auxerre (died c. 865) was a member of the Benedictine Abbey of Saint-Germain d'Auxerre. Although he was the author of numerous Biblical commentaries and theological texts, little of his life is known today.

Haimo defended the real presence of Christ in the Eucharist and condemned those who considered that the Eucharist was just a "sign". This realism applied also to his ecclesiology. His exegetical commentary was an important source for Adso of Montier-en-Der's letter on the life of the Antichrist.

Several texts, including those published in the Patrologia Latina, previously attributed to Haymo of Halberstadt, are now believed to be his work. Haimo's exegetical writings are indexed as part of Burton Van Name Edwards's project, "The Manuscript Transmission of Carolingian Biblical Commentaries".

== Editions ==
- Ed. Abbé Migne, Patrologia Latina, 116, 117, 131, à consulter sur Documenta Catholica Omnia
- Ed. R. Gryson, Haymo Autissiodorensis. Annotatio libri Isaiae prophetae (= Corpus Christianorum. Continuatio Mediaevalis, 135C), Turnhout: Brepols Publishers, 2014 (ISBN 978-2-503-55219-4).
- Ed. R. Gryson, Haymo Autissiodorensis. Annotatio libri Iezechielis imperfecta (= Corpus Christianorum. Continuatio Mediaevalis, 135E), Turnhout: Brepols Publishers, 2015 (ISBN 978-2-503-55702-1).
