= Homelessness of Jesus =

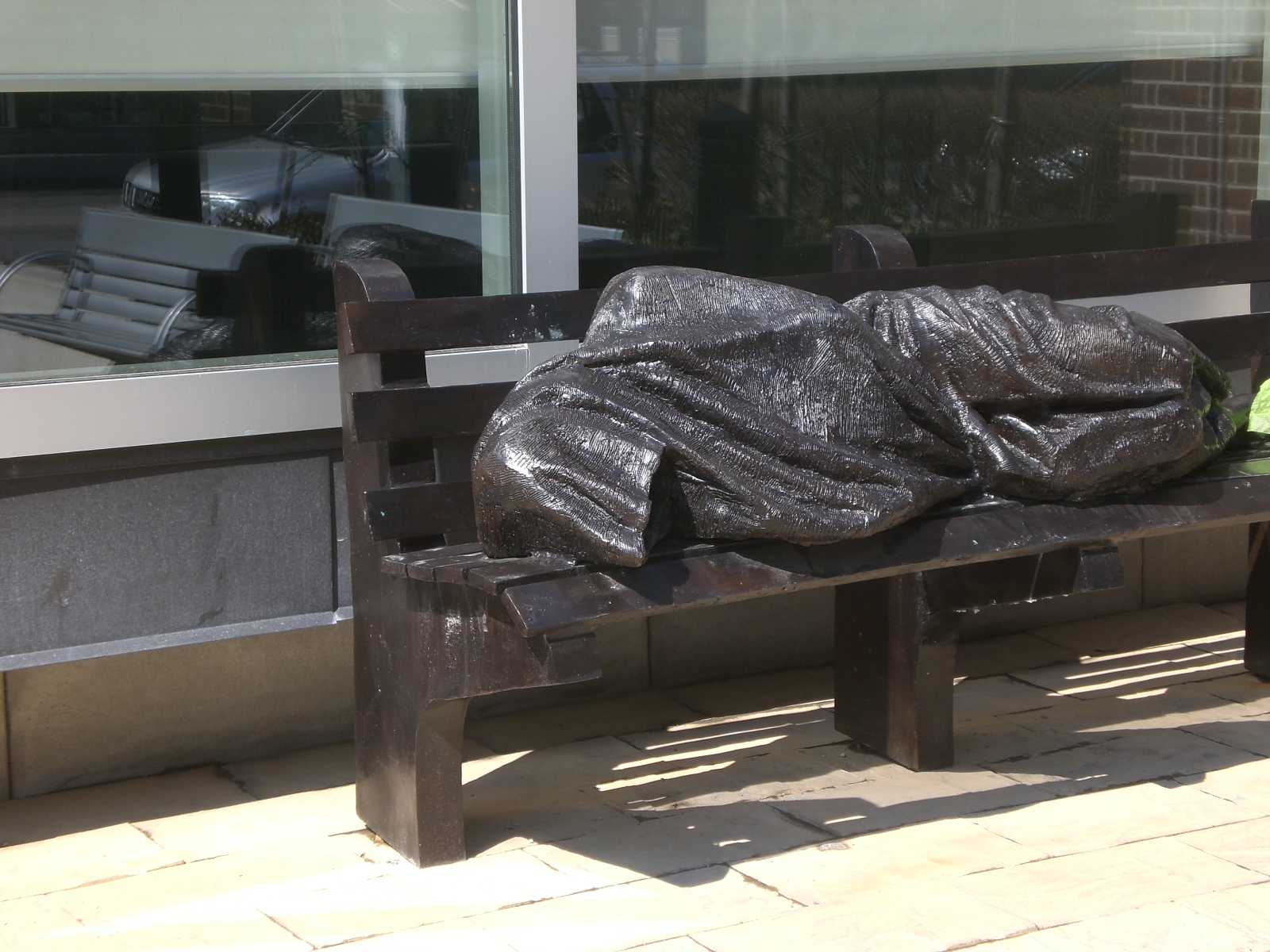
Canadian sculptor Tim Schmalz's 2013 sculpture Jesus the Homeless

The gospels suggest that Jesus lacked a permanent home during the period of public ministry that occupied his last years. He left the economic security he had as an artisan and the reciprocity he had with his family and wandered Judaea depending on charity. Many of the people on whom he depended for charity were women. Because his ministry took place in the vicinity of his disciples' hometowns, it is likely that the group often slept at the homes of the disciples' family members.

== Scriptural analysis ==
Of the Four Evangelists, Luke emphasizes Jesus' homelessness the most. Matthew 8:20 and Luke 9:58 both record a statement by Jesus in which he describes his homelessness by saying that "foxes have holes and the birds of the air have nests, but the son of man has nowhere to lay his head". The implication is that the scribe who has just offered to become a follower of Jesus should also expect the same. Theologian John Gill noted a parallel between this saying and the Jews' expectation of the Messiah: "if he (the Messiah) should come, 'there's no place in which he can sit down'.

== Interpretation ==
Sophiologists interpreted Jesus' homelessness as the homelessness of Sophia. New Monastic writer Shane Claiborne refers to Jesus as "the homeless rabbi". Catholic theologian Rosemary Radford Ruether discusses Jesus' homelessness in relation to the concept of kenosis, the voluntary renunciation of power in order to submit to the will of God. In a book length study on the Gospel of Matthew, Robert J. Myles has argued that the homelessness of Jesus is often romanticized in biblical interpretation in a way that obscures the destitution and lack of agency that would have likely accompanied the situation.

=== Representation in Art and Literature ===
==== Contemporary Art ====
Canadian sculptor Tim Schmalz created Jesus the Homeless, a 2013 bronze sculpture of Jesus lying on a park bench covered in a blanket with his wounded feet protruding.

==== Contemporary Literature ====
Books addressing this issue are following:

- The Homeless Jesus in the Gospel of Matthew. A provocative look at the Gospel of Matthew that explores the dysfunction between Jesus and the homeless.
- Jesus Among the Homeless. A book that identifies the problem of homelessness and applies strategies based on scriptural principles as a solution.
- Meeting Homeless Jesus: A Journey From Believing to Knowing. A collection of true stories with a message about the Christian faith.

== Bibliography ==
- Becker, Jürgen (1998). Jesus of Nazareth. Walter de Gruyter. ISBN 978-3110157727.
- Claiborne, Shane (2010). Follow Me to Freedom: Leading and Following as an Ordinary Radical. ReadHowYouWant. ISBN 978-1459607033.
- Denaux, Adelbert (2010). Studies in the Gospel of Luke: Structure, Language and Theology. LIT Verlag. ISBN 978-3643900609.
- Fiensy, David A. (2007). Jesus the Galilean: Soundings in a First Century Life. Gorgias Press. ISBN 978-1593333133.
- Jackson, Al (2010). Adam Greenway; Chuck Lawless (eds.). The American Dream or the Great Commission Resurgence?. pp. 245–264. ISBN 978-1433672163.
- Myles, Robert J. (2014). The Homeless Jesus in the Gospel of Matthew. Sheffield Phoenix Press.
- Perkins, Robert L. (2004). Practice in Christianity. Mercer University Press. ISBN 978-0865549302.
- Ryken, Philip Graham (2012). Grace Transforming. Good News Publishers. ISBN 978-1433534034.
- Stanton, Graham (2013). Studies in Matthew and Early Christianity. Mohr Siebeck. ISBN 978-3161525438.
- Theissen, Gerd (2009). James H. Charlesworth; Petr Pokorny (eds.). Jesus as an Itinerant Preacher: Reflections from Social History on Jesus' Roles. ISBN 978-0802863539.
