= Matthew 8:21 =

- ← 8:20 8:22 →
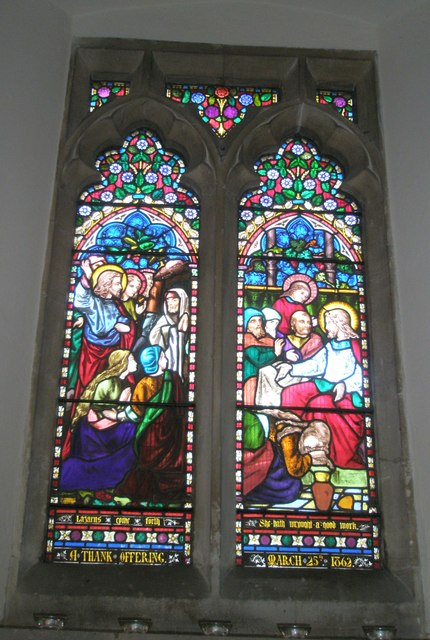
- Stained glass window showing Jesus with his disciples at St Nicholas, Wickham (2009).
- Book: Gospel of Matthew
- Christian Bible part: New Testament

Matthew 8:21 is the 21st verse in the eighth chapter of the Gospel of Matthew in the New Testament of the Christian Bible.

== Content ==
In the original Greek according to Westcott-Hort this verse is:

Ἕτερος δὲ τῶν μαθητῶν αὐτοῦ εἶπεν αὐτῷ, Κύριε, ἐπίτρεψόν μοι πρῶτον ἀπελθεῖν καὶ θάψαι τὸν πατέρα μου.

In the King James Version of the Bible the text reads:

And another of his disciples said unto him, Lord, suffer me first to go and bury my father.

The New International Version translates the passage as:

Another disciple said to him, "Lord, first let me go and bury my father."

For a collection of other versions see BibleHub Matthew 8:21.

== Analysis ==
From this passage, it is clear that all the disciples did not attach themselves to Jesus constantly. Thus, also was the case with Joseph of Arimathea, who from fear of the ruling Jews, remained aloof. He uses more reverence and obedience in his question saying κυριε (lord) and "suffer me / let me" unlike the scribe in the previous verse. Whether the father here mentioned is dead or alive is open to debate. Some would phrase the request "suffer me to remain and help my father, who is now old, then I will follow You." Others believe the father is dead.

== Commentary from the Church Fathers ==
Jerome: "In what one thing is this disciple like the Scribe? The one called Him Master, the other confesses Him as his Lord. The one from filial piety asks permission to go and bury his father; the other offers to follow, not seeking a master, but by means of his master seeking gain for himself."

Hilary of Poitiers: "The disciple does not ask whether he shall follow Him; for he already believed that he ought to follow, but prays to be suffered first to bury his father."

Preceded by Matthew 8:20	Gospel of Matthew; Chapter 8	Succeeded by Matthew 8:22
