= Matthew 8:19 =

- ← 8:18 8:20 →
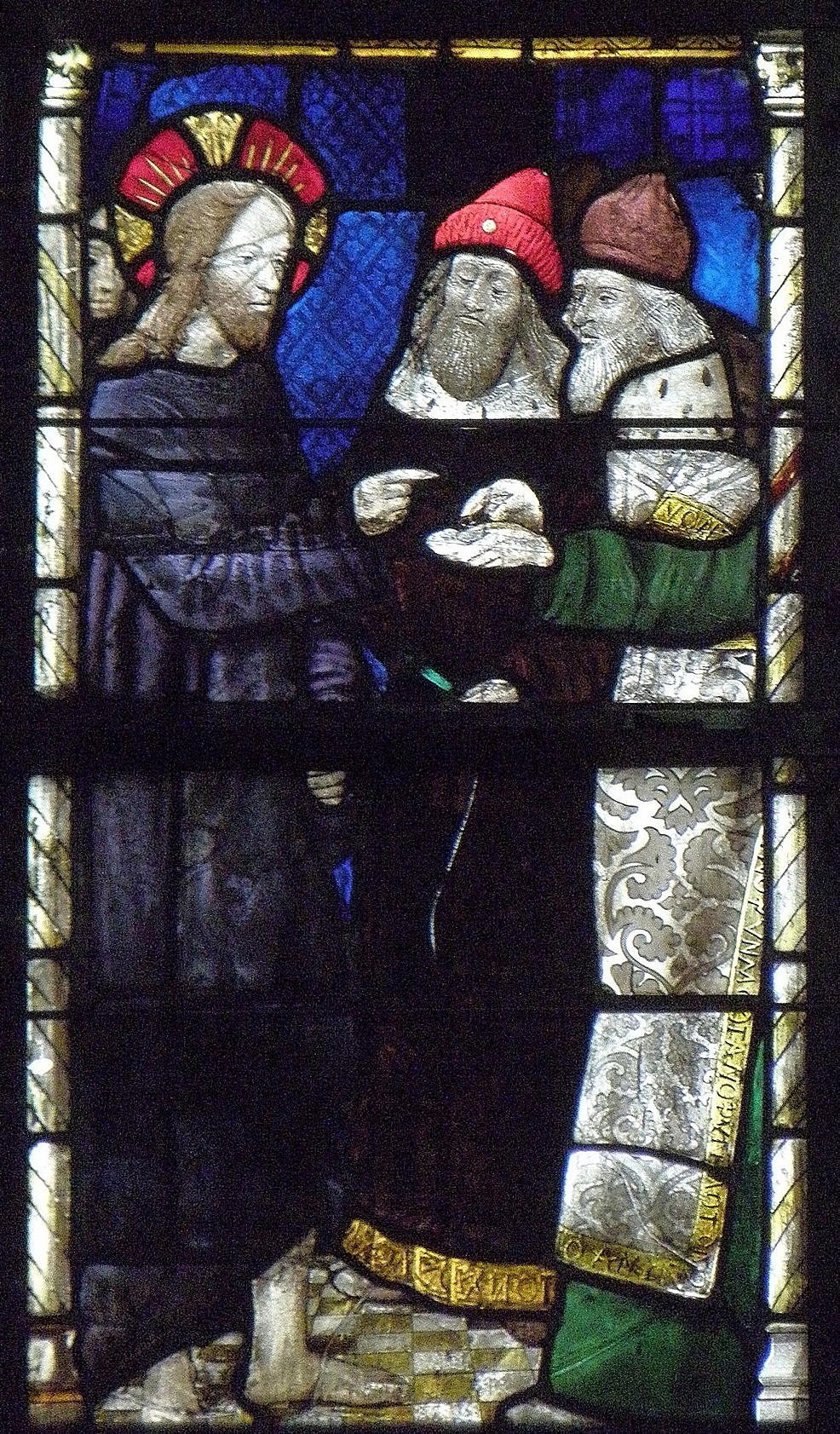
- Jesus with the scribes and the Pharisee. l'église Saint-Germain de Rennes
- Book: Gospel of Matthew
- Christian Bible part: New Testament

Matthew 8:19 is the 19th verse in the eighth chapter of the Gospel of Matthew in the New Testament of the Christian Bible.

== Content ==
In the original Greek according to Westcott-Hort this verse is:

Καὶ προσελθὼν εἷς γραμματεὺς εἶπεν αὐτῷ, Διδάσκαλε, ἀκολουθήσω σοι ὅπου ἐὰν ἀπέρχῃ.

In the King James Version of the Bible the text reads:

And a certain scribe came, and said unto him, Master, I will follow thee whithersoever thou goest.

The New International Version translates the passage as:

Then a teacher of the law came to him and said, "Teacher, I will follow you wherever you go."

For a collection of other versions see BibleHub Matthew 8:19.

== Analysis ==
When Jesus was on His way to the lake, this scribe or doctor of the law, offered to become a disciple. He was likely moved to do so by Jesus' preaching and miracles.

== Commentary from the Church Fathers ==
Jerome: "This Scribe of the Law who knew but the perishing letter, would not have been turned away had his address been, ‘Lord, I will follow Thee.’ But because he esteemed the Saviour only as one of many masters, and was a 1man of the letter (which is better expressed in Greek, γραμματεὺς) not a spiritual hearer, therefore he had no place where Jesus might lay His head. It is suggested to us that he sought to follow the Lord, because of His great miracles, for the sake of the gain to be derived from them; and was therefore rejected; seeking the same thing as did Simon Magus when he would have given Peter money."

Chrysostom: "Observe also how great his pride; approaching and speaking as though he disdained to be considered as one of the multitude; desiring to show that he was above the rest."

Hilary of Poitiers: "Otherwise; This Scribe being one of the doctors of the Law, asks if he shall follow Him, as though it were not contained in the Law that this is He whom it were gain to follow. Therefore He discovers the feeling of unbelief under the diffidence of his enquiry. For the taking up of the faith is not by question but by following."

| Preceded by Matthew 8:18 | Gospel of Matthew; Chapter 8 | Succeeded by Matthew 8:20 |
