= Messengers from John the Baptist =

Deputation sent by John the Baptist to meet with Jesus

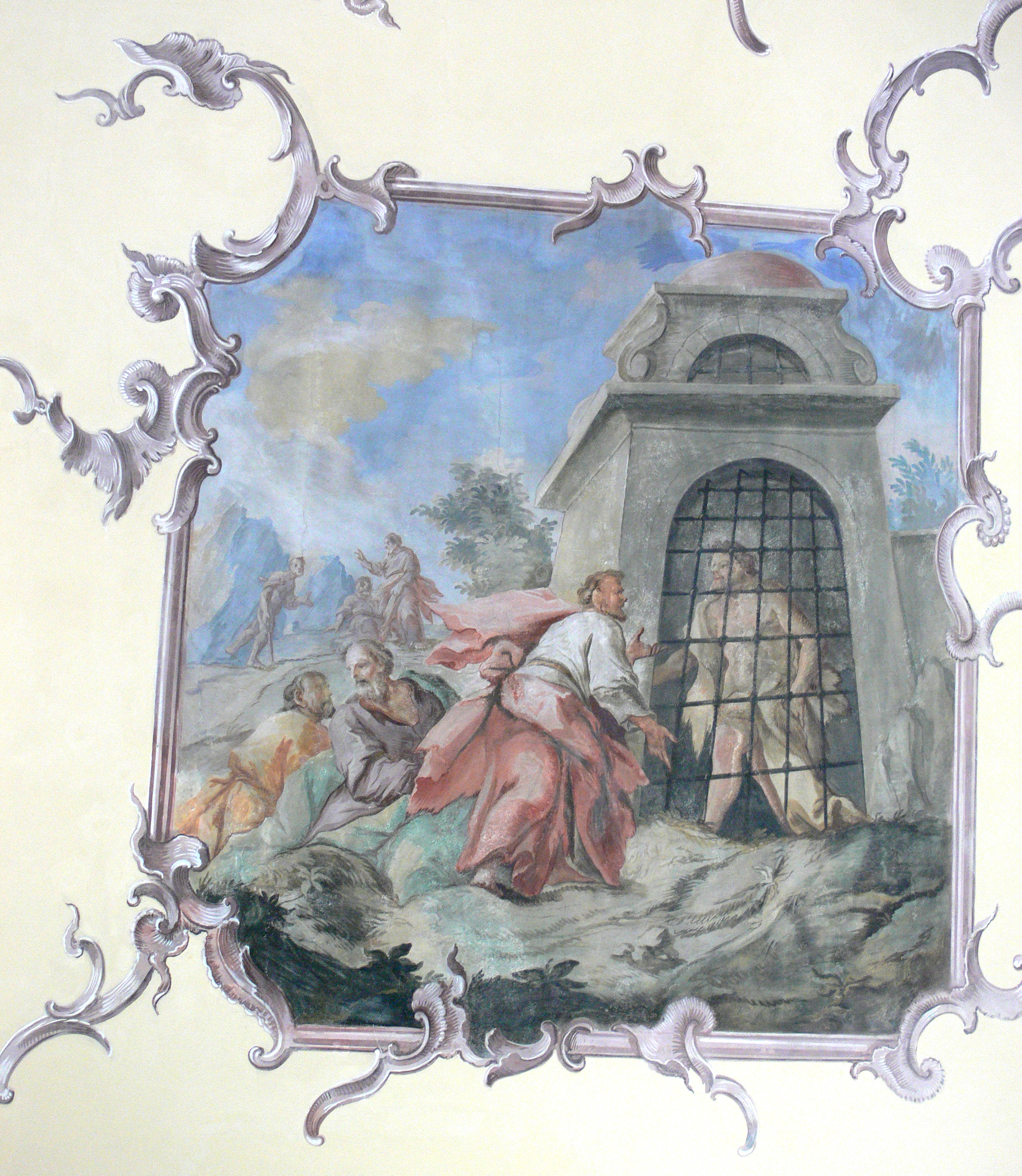
John the Baptist in prison, by Josef Anton Hafner, 1750.

In the New Testament, the messengers who came from John the Baptist to Jesus are referred to in Matthew 11:2–6 and Luke 7:18–23.

Their deputation to meet with Jesus is recounted some time after the Baptism of Jesus, when John is in prison in the fort of Machaerus and hears of the works performed by Jesus. He seeks confirmation as to whether Jesus is the prophesied Messiah of the Old Testament. John sends (two of) his disciples as messengers to ask a question from Jesus: "Are you the one to come after me or shall we wait for another?" Jesus replied back to John through the messengers to take note of all the miraculous works he has done as described in Luke 7:22.

According to the Gospel of Matthew:

When John heard in prison what Christ was doing, he sent his disciples to ask him, "Are you the one who was to come, or should we expect someone else?" Jesus replied, "Go back and report to John what you hear and see: The blind receive sight, the lame walk, those who have leprosy are cured, the deaf hear, the dead are raised, and the good news is preached to the poor. Blessed is the man who does not fall away on account of me."

Eric Franklin suggests that John's question is motivated by his perception of a difference between Jesus' conduct of his ministry and John's expectations. John had announced that one "mightier than he" would come in judgment, with "his winnowing fork ... in his hand, to clear his threshing floor and to gather the wheat into his barn, but the chaff he [would] burn with unquenchable fire", but, instead, had heard reports of one who "sat loose to the law" and "embraced a way of surrender".

The "best manuscript authorities" state that John sent word δια των μαθητων αυτου, dia tōn mathētōn autou, i.e. by means of his disciples, although δύο τῶν μαθητῶν αὐτοῦ, duo tōn mathētōn autou, meaning two of his disciples, appears in the Textus Receptus. Biblical commentator Marvin Vincent argues that "the correct reading is διά". Luke's text also refers to "two of his disciples".

Following this episode, Jesus begins to speak to the crowds about John the Baptist, according to the reports of Matthew 11:7–11 and Luke 7:24–28.

== See also ==
- Chronology of Jesus
- Gospel harmony
- Mandaeans
