= Jordan Walker Ross =

American actor (born 1990)

Jordan Walker Ross (born 1990) is an American actor best known for portraying Little James in the Christian historical drama television series The Chosen.

== Early life ==
Walker Ross was born in Arlington, Texas in 1990. He was born two months premature. As a result, he has cerebral palsy, scoliosis and asthma. He was homeschooled and enrolled in public school in the ninth grade. He finished KD conservatory college of film and dramatic arts in 2010.

== Career ==
Walker Ross' first role was that of Tiny Tim in the local staging of Charles Dickens' A Christmas Carol. He played Mikel in Paramount+ western miniseries 1883 (2021-2022). He played Captain La Force in a historical feature film Washington's Armor: The Journey (2022). He said that his role of Little James in The Chosen came at the perfect time because he didn't have a job for at least four years. He had a role in the Christian science fiction thriller film The Shift (2023), written and directed by Brock Heasley. Jordan is the host of the podcast What’s Your Limp?.

== Personal life ==
Walker Ross is married to Stacy Ross. The couple has three children. He has a cerebral palsy, scoliosis and asthma, which he testified about in the media. According to his words, he was a subject of bullying. His health condition negatively affected his acting career. He said that he was surprised when Dallas Jenkins asked him to make his own disability part of the The Chosen character. Since then, he advocates for visibility of disabilities and tries to inspire others. Jordan is the grandson of actor Barry Corbin.
