= Wife of Peter the Apostle =

Woman mentioned in the Bible

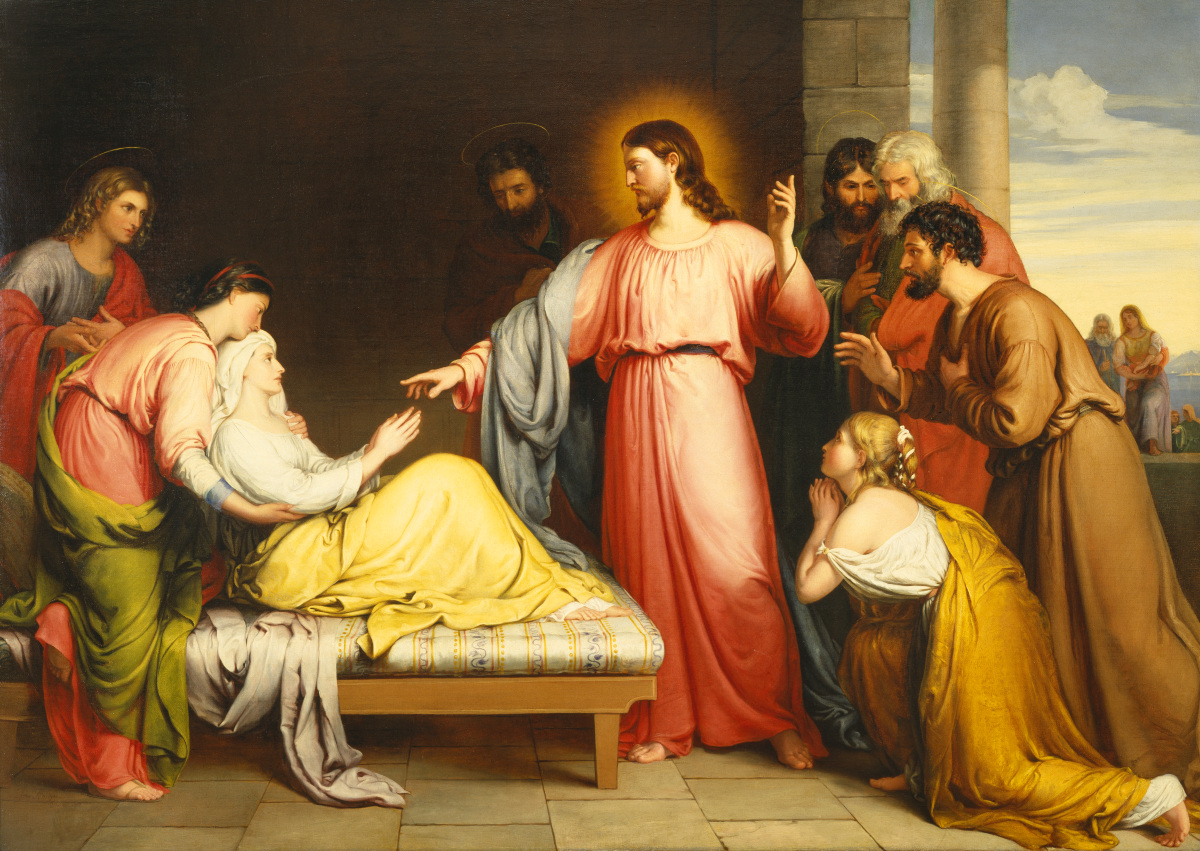
1839 painting of the healing of Peter's mother-in-law

The wife of the apostle Peter is a figure mentioned in the Bible. Her existence and role in ministry has been discussed in church history for its implications about celibacy, especially in leadership, and about women's participation in missionary journeys.

== Bible ==
- Matthew 8:14–15, Mark 1:29–31, and Luke 4:38–39 tell of an episode where Jesus heals Peter’s mother-in-law, implying that he has a wife.
- In 1 Corinthians 9:5, Paul asks, 'Do we not have the right to be accompanied by a believing wife, as do the other apostles and the brothers of the Lord and Cephas?'

== Early church writing ==
- Clement of Alexandria (d. c. 215) presents Peter and his wife as an exemplary married couple. He writes that they had children together and that Peter's wife and the other apostles' wives were 'fellow-ministers' with their husbands who entered women's houses and taught them the gospel. Clement also records a tradition that Peter's wife was martyred. He used this in his argument against the Encratites, who were opposed to marriage.
- Tertullian (d. 220) writes that he can see that Peter was married because of his mother-in-law.
- Origen (d. 253) writes that Peter might have been thinking of his wife when he said that he had left everything to follow Jesus (Matthew 19:27).
- Basil of Caesarea (d. 379) mentions that Peter was married.
- Ambrosiaster (c. 366–84) points out that being married did not prevent Peter being leader of the apostles.
- John Chrysostom (d. 407) uses Peter’s marriage to support his point that the apostles were 'men like us', with family lives. He says, 'Where there is a mother-in-law, there is a wife; where there is a wife, there is a marriage.'
- Jerome (d. 419/420) writes that Peter 'had a mother-in-law at the time he believed and that he did not have a wife anymore'. He describes his wife as being among the things Peter left, with his nets and his boat, to follow Christ.

== Apocrypha ==
- Coptic fragments in The Acts of Peter, Acts of Philip and Acts of Saints Nereus and Achilleus include further tradition about Peter's wife and their children, including a daughter, Petronilla.

== Modern interpretations ==
Some modern commentators have highlighted her role in travelling with Peter for his missionary journeys, as mentioned in 1 Corinthians 9:5. It has sometimes been suggested that she could be the woman who sends her greetings in 1 Peter 5:13.

Peter's wife is portrayed by Lara Silva in the 2017 TV series The Chosen. In that series, she is called Eden.
