= Haymo of Halberstadt =

German Benedictine monk, bishop and author

Haymo (or Haimo) (died 27 March 853) was a German Benedictine monk who served as bishop of Halberstadt, and was a noted author.

== Biography ==
The exact date and place of Haymo's birth are unknown. He entered the Order of St. Benedict at Fulda as a youth, where the celebrated Rabanus Maurus was one of his fellow students. He went together with him to the Monastery of St. Martin at Tours to profit by the lessons of its great teacher, Alcuin.

After a brief sojourn at Tours, both friends came back to the Benedictine house at Fulda, and there they spent most of their life previous to their promotion to the episcopal dignity. Haymo became chancellor to the monastery, as is proved by his records of its transactions, which are still extant. It is probable that owing to his great learning he was also entrusted with the teaching of theology in the same monastery, but there is no positive proof of this.

He had been living for only a short while in the Benedictine monastery at Hersfeld, perhaps as its abbot, when in the last weeks of 840 he was nominated to the Bishopric of Halberstadt. Hearing of Haymo's promotion, Rabanus Maurus, his old friend, gave him at great length—in a work entitled "De Universo" and divided into 22 books—advice that would help him in the discharge of the episcopal office.

In compliance with Rabanus's suggestions, Haymo stood aloof from the Court of King Louis the German, did not entangle himself in the affairs of the State, preached often and lived solely for the welfare of his diocese. The only public assembly which he attended was the Council of Mainz, held in 847 for the maintenance of the ecclesiastical rights and immunities. Haymo died on 26 March 853.

== Writings ==
There is no doubt that Haymo of Halberstadt was a prolific writer, although a number of works, particularly those of Haimo of Auxerre, have been wrongly ascribed to him. Most of his genuine works are commentaries on Holy Writ, the following of which have been printed: "In Psalmos explanatio"; "In Isaiam libri tres"; "In XII Prophetas"; "In Epistolas Pauli omnes" and "In Apocalypsim libri septem". As might be naturally expected from the exegetical methods of his day, Haymo is not an original commentator; he simply repeats or abridges the Scriptural explanations which he finds in patristic writings. As a pious monk, and a faithful observer of Rabanus's recommendations, he writes almost exclusively about the moral and mystical senses of the sacred text.

He is also the author of an Epitome of Eusebius's Ecclesiastical History, of a large number of sermons, and of a spiritual work, De amore coelestis patriae.

His works are contained in volumes cxvi-cxviii of Migne, Patrologia Latina.

Some homilies once attributed to Haymo of Halberstadt are now to be attributed to Haymo of Auxerre.

== Sources ==
- Herbermann, Charles, ed. (1913). "Haymo". Catholic Encyclopedia. New York: Robert Appleton Company.

Catholic Church titles
Preceded by Thiatgrim	Bishop of Halberstadt; 840–853	Succeeded by Hildegrim II
