= Healing the mother of Peter's wife =

Miracle carried out by Jesus according to the Bible

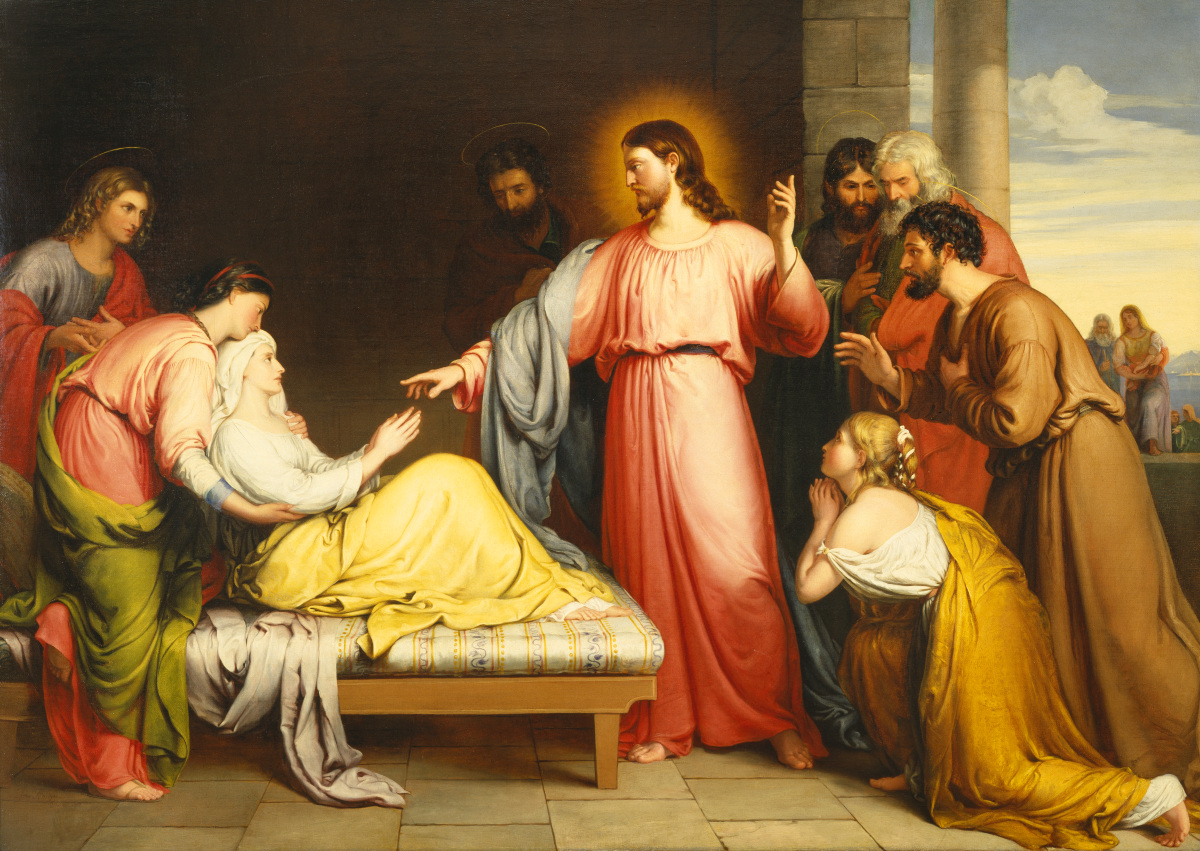
Healing Peter's mother-in-law by John Bridges, 19th century

The healing of the mother of Peter's wife is one of the miracles of Jesus in the Gospels, reported in Matthew 8:14–15, Mark 1:29–31, and Luke 4:38–39.

== Narrative ==
In the Gospels of Mark and Luke, this episode takes place after Jesus had been preaching at the synagogue of Capernaum. Jesus goes to Peter's house, where he sees the mother of Peter's wife lying in bed with a high fever. Jesus touches her hand and the fever leaves her, and she gets up and begins to wait on him. In Matthew's gospel the event is the third in a series of healings recorded in chapter 8 which take place following Jesus's Sermon on the Mount.

== Commentary ==
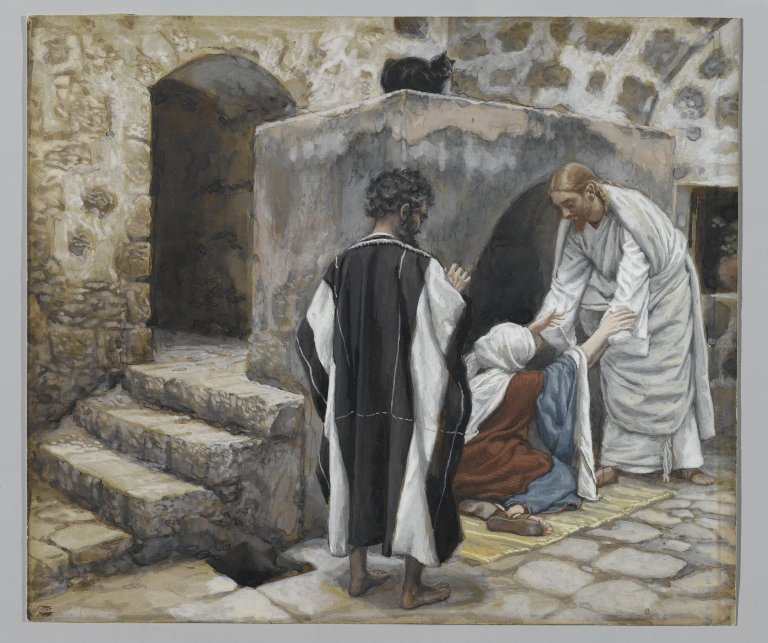
1880s/1890s painting of the healing of Peter's mother-in-law by James Tissot

Peter's wife's mother was sick with fever. In the Talmud, fever is described as a fire. The original Greek implies that she was seriously ill. Those present mention her illness to Jesus. He walked over to her, took her hand, and helped her up. Then the fever left her and she waited on them.

Silas Henderson notes that in Mark's gospel, the Greek word translated as "helped her up" is the same used later in Mark 16:6 by the angel at the tomb when he tells the women that Jesus "has been raised". Henderson views this as Mark making a connection to the Resurrection, suggesting that a woman grievously ill has been restored to new life demonstrated by service to others.

In the majority of readings of Matthew 8:15, she began to wait upon "him" (i.e. Jesus) but in the Textus Receptus she began to wait upon "them" (Greek: αὐτοῖς, autois). Mark and Luke both refer to "them"; Johann Bengel therefore argues that in Matthew's gospel, "him" is the correct reading and "them" is an "erroneous reading ... introduced from the other Evangelists".

Following this event, the Gospels report that at sunset, "the people brought to Jesus all who had various kinds of sickness or were demon-possessed, and laying his hands on each one, Jesus healed them and cast demons out of them" (Matthew 8:16–18).

Biblical commentator Matthew Henry used the incident to argue that "Christ ... showed that he approved of the married state, by being thus kind to Peter's wife's relations".

Ambrose of Milan writes that, "the fever of the soul is the fire of concupiscence, the burning heat of lust, of gluttony, of pride, of envy, etc."

== Commentary from the Church Fathers ==
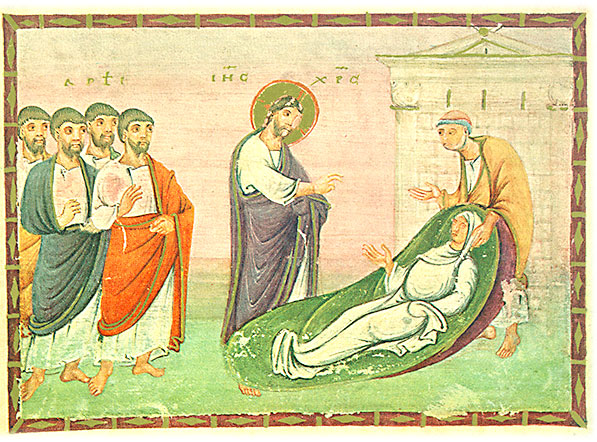
Healing of Peter's mother-in-law depicted in the 10th-century Codex Egberti

Glossa Ordinaria: And it is not enough that she is cured, but strength is given her besides, for she arose and ministered unto them.

Chrysostom: This, she arose and ministered unto them, shows at once the Lord's power, and the woman's feeling towards Christ.

Bede: Figuratively; Peter's house is the Law, or the circumcision, his mother-in-law the synagogue, which is as it were the mother of the Church committed to Peter. She is in a fever, that is, she is sick of zealous hate, and persecutes the Church. The Lord touches her hand, when He turns her carnal works to spiritual uses.

Saint Remigius: Or by Peter's mother-in-law may be understood the Law, which according to the Apostle was made weak through the flesh, i. e. the carnal understanding. But when the Lord through the mystery of the Incarnation appeared visibly in the synagogue, and fulfilled the Law in action, and taught that it was to be understood spiritually; straightway it thus allied with the grace of the Gospel received such strength, that what had been the minister of death and punishment, became the minister of life and glory.

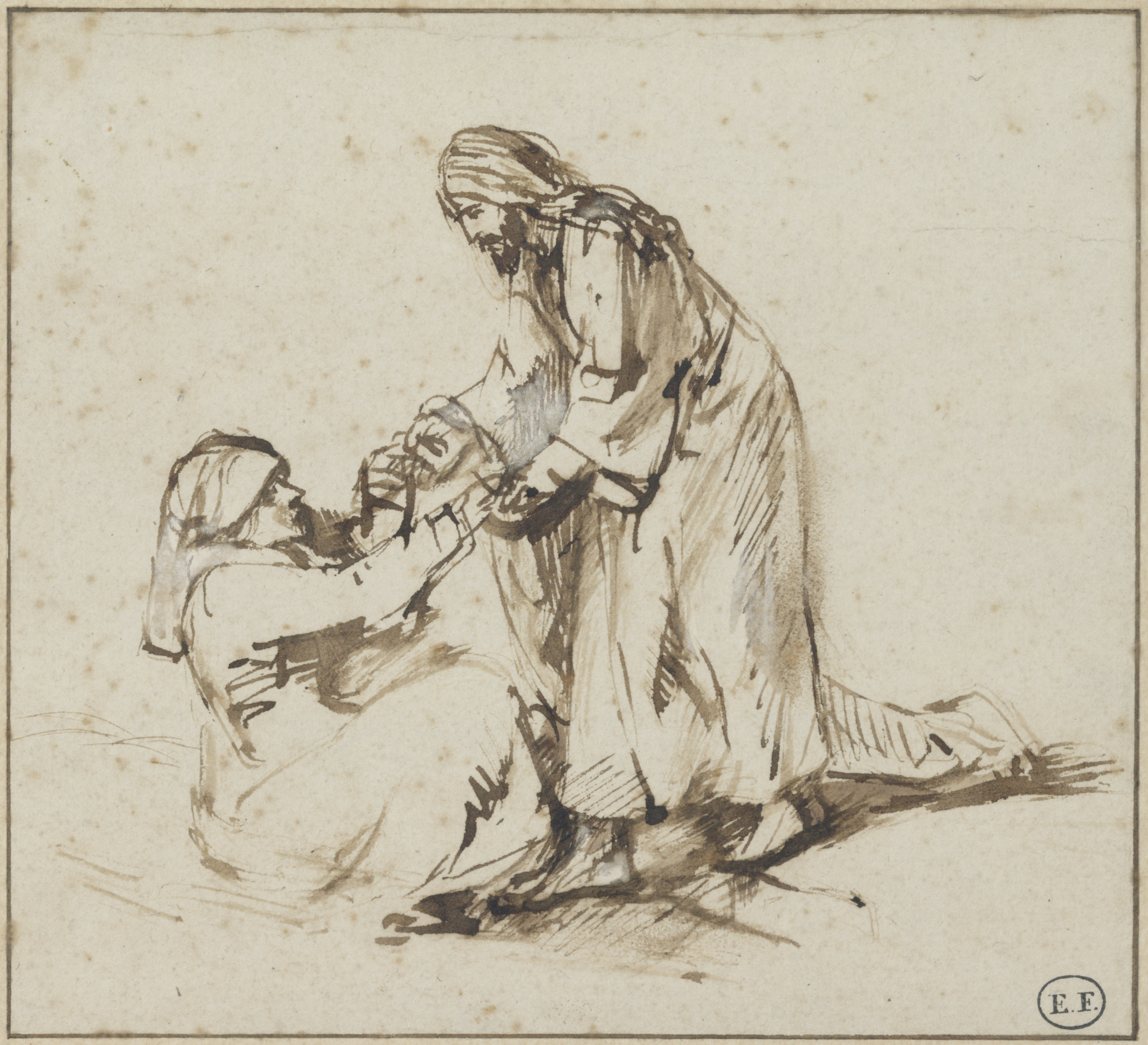
Sketch of the healing of Peter's mother-in-law by Rembrandt

Rabanus Maurus: Or, every soul that struggles with fleshly lusts is sick of a fever, but touched with the hand of Divine mercy, it recovers health, and restrains the concupiscence of the flesh by the bridle of continence, and with those limbs with which it had served uncleanness, it now ministers to righteousness.

Hilary of Poitiers: Or; In Peter's wife's mother is shown the sickly condition of infidelity, to which freedom of will is near akin, being united by the bonds as it were of wedlock. By the Lord's entrance into Peter's house, that is into the body, unbelief is cured, which was before sick of the fever of sin, and ministers in duties of righteousness to the Saviour.

== See also ==
- Life of Jesus in the New Testament
- Ministry of Jesus
- Parables of Jesus
