= Healing of the centurion's servant =

Miracle carried out by Jesus according to the Bible

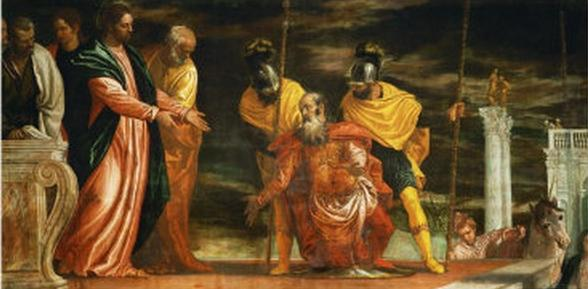
Jesus healing the servant of a Centurion, by the Venetian artist Paolo Veronese, 16th century

The healing of the centurion's servant is one of the miracles performed by Jesus of Nazareth as related in the Gospel of Matthew and the Gospel of Luke (both part of the Christian biblical canon).

According to these accounts, a Roman centurion asks Jesus for his help because his servant is ill. Jesus offers to go to the centurion's house to perform a healing, but the centurion hesitates because he understands he is not worthy for Jesus to enter under his roof. He suggests that Jesus' word of authority would be sufficient in healing. Impressed, Jesus comments approvingly at the strong religious faith displayed by the soldier (despite not being a Jew) and grants the request, which results in the servant being healed the same day.

== Sources ==
=== Scriptural sources ===
The story of the centurion appears both in the Gospel of Matthew and that of Luke:

When Jesus had entered Capernaum, a centurion came to him, asking for help. "Lord," he said, "my servant lies at home paralyzed, suffering terribly." Jesus said to him, "Shall I come and heal him?" The centurion replied, "Lord, I do not deserve to have you come under my roof. But just say the word. For I myself am a man under authority, with soldiers under me. I tell this one, 'Go,' and he goes; and that one, 'Come,' and he comes. I say to my servant, 'Do this,' and he does it." When Jesus heard this, he was amazed and said to those following him, "Truly I tell you, I have not found anyone in Israel with such great faith. I say to you that many will come from the east and the west, and will take their places at the feast with Abraham, Isaac and Jacob in the kingdom of heaven. But the subjects of the kingdom will be thrown outside, into the darkness, where there will be weeping and gnashing of teeth." Then Jesus said to the centurion, "Go! Let it be done just as you believed it would." And his servant was healed at that very hour.

— Matthew 8:5–13

When Jesus had finished saying all this to the people who were listening, he entered Capernaum. There a centurion's servant, whom his master valued highly, was sick and about to die. The centurion heard of Jesus and sent some elders of the Jews to him, asking him to come and heal his servant. When they came to Jesus, they pleaded earnestly with him, "This man deserves to have you do this, because he loves our nation and has built our synagogue." So Jesus went with them. He was not far from the house when the centurion sent friends to say to him: "Lord, don't trouble yourself, for I do not deserve to have you come under my roof. That is why I did not even consider myself worthy to come to you. But say the word, and my servant will be healed. For I myself am a man under authority, with soldiers under me. I tell this one, 'Go,' and he goes; and that one, 'Come,' and he comes. I say to my servant, 'Do this,' and he does it." When Jesus heard this, he was amazed at him, and turning to the crowd following him, he said, "I tell you, I have not found such great faith even in Israel." Then the men who had been sent returned to the house and found the servant well.

— Luke 7:1–10

=== Origins ===
The story of the centurion is not mentioned in the Gospel of Mark, the earliest of the four gospels. Craig Keener suggests that Matthew and Luke’s material came from a source "Q"; this passage would then be an anomaly as the story of the centurion includes background detail. It would also be the only miracle story that originated in Q. One possibility for Keener is that only the dialogue was in Q, and the evangelists added the details from a shared oral history. Since the late twentieth century alternative hypotheses that posit use of Matthew by Luke or vice versa without Q are growing.

The basic problem is the difference between the two accounts. Since Luke does not say that the centurion himself came to Christ, but only sent to Him, first Jews, and then his friends. St. John Chrysostom, Theophylact of Ohrid, and Euthymius, all hold that these events in Luke happened first and then last of all the centurion came to Christ. He did this "either for the sake of doing Him honour, or because of the urgency of the disease, and the imminent peril of death." St. Augustine and Bede are of the opinion that the centurion never came to Jesus but only came in the sense of sending his friends as emissaries.

=== John's Gospel ===
The Gospel of John does narrate the account of Jesus healing the son of a royal official at Capernaum at a distance in John 4:46–54. Some modern commentators treat them as the same event. Mark Goodacre argues that John’s healing is a version of the centurion’s boy story. Hugo Mendez views the story in John as an adaptation of the Synoptics while being just different enough for a reader to interpret it as a separate event. However, in his analysis of Matthew, R. T. France presents linguistic arguments against the equivalence of pais and son and considers these two separate miracles. Merrill C. Tenney in his commentary on John and Orville Daniel in his Gospel harmony also consider them to be two different incidents.

== Interpretations ==
According to I. Howard Marshall, there were no Roman forces in Galilee prior to AD 44; therefore, the soldier was probably a member of Herod Antipas's troops, which modeled Roman organization. Either way, although his nationality is not given, he is clearly a gentile.

=== Meaning of "servant" ===
Luke 7:2 and 7:10 refer to the person to be healed as δοῦλος (doûlos), unambiguously meaning "slave" (interpretatively translated as "servant") but has the centurion himself call him παῖς (pais) – which has a number of more ambiguous meanings including "boy", "child" (e.g., Matt 2:16), "son" (John 4:51), "slave", and "servant" (Luke 15:26, Acts 4:25).

=== Meaning of "such faith" ===
Christ says "He did not find such faith in all Israel", which, according to John McEvilly implies that he was a Pagan soldier, most likely Roman. He further states that this statement must have excluded those who "from the very nature of things, and the well-known evidence of facts, were excepted". This exception would include the Virgin Mary, John the Baptist, the Patriarchs and Prophets of the Old Testament, the Apostles, etc. This is clear when Jesus refers to John the Baptist, saying, "No greater arose among the born of women." (Matt 11:11) And of course he would have excluded himself.

=== Gnostic interpretation ===
In his Against Heresies, Irenaeus conveys that some Gnostics believed the story to be metaphorical, with the centurion being merely a symbol of the demiurge. According to this interpretation, the demiurge tells Jesus that he has tried all he could to save the servant (humanity) but his laws have not succeeded in healing humanity or offering it a proper means towards spiritual development. Accordingly, the demiurge urges Jesus to say a word (spread gnosis) to offer true salvation to humanity.

=== Homosexual interpretation ===
Daniel A. Helminiak, an American Catholic priest, theologian and author of What the Bible Really Says about Homosexuality, states that the word pais, used for the servant, could have a sexual meaning. Theodore W. Jennings Jr. and Tat-Siong Benny Liew, also authors of various Christian books, further write that Roman historical data about patron-client relationships and about same-sex relations among soldiers support the view that the pais in Matthew's account is the centurion's "boy-lover", and that the centurion, therefore, did not want Jesus to enter his house for fear perhaps that the boy would be enamoured of Jesus instead. The Roman military historian D.B. Saddington writes that while he does not exclude the possibility, the evidence the two put forward supports "neither of these interpretations".

== Liturgical use ==
The statements of the centurion are used in the Prayer of Humble Access contained in many Anglican, Methodist, Presbyterian, and other Christian Eucharist liturgies. His words are also used in the Communion rite of the Mass in the Roman Rite of the Catholic Church.

== See also ==
- Homosexuality in the New Testament
- Life of Jesus in the New Testament
- Ministry of Jesus
- Parables of Jesus
