= Matthew 8:4 =

- ← 8:3 8:5 →
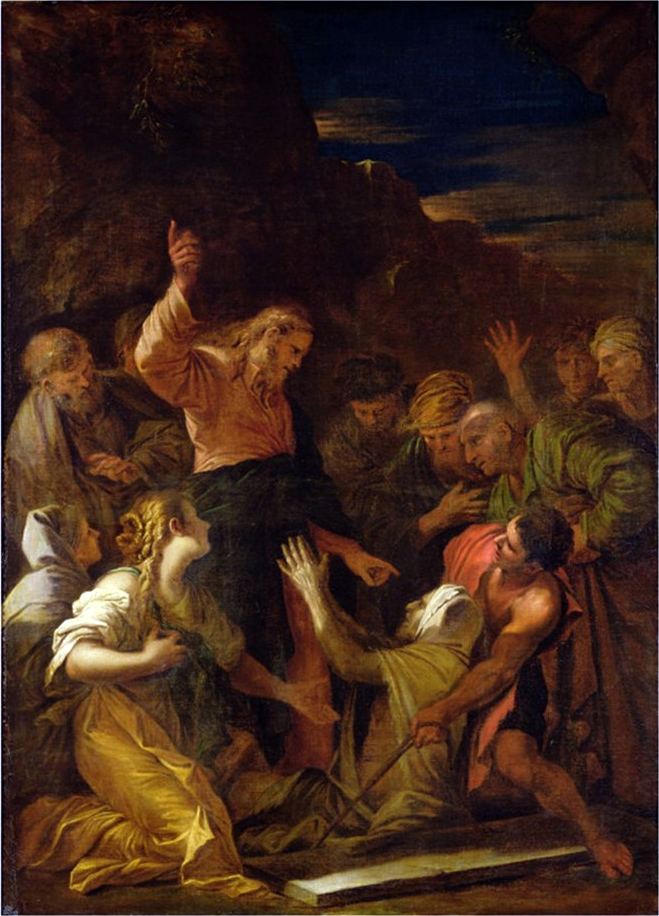
- A nineteenth century depiction of Jesus healing the leper by Jean-Marie Melchior Doze
- Book: Gospel of Matthew
- Christian Bible part: New Testament

Matthew 8:4 is the fourth verse of the eighth chapter of the Gospel of Matthew in the New Testament. This verse concludes the miracle story of Jesus cleansing a leper, the first of a series of miracles in Matthew.

== Content ==
In the original Greek according to Westcott-Hort this verse is:

καὶ λέγει αὐτῷ ὁ Ἰησοῦς ὅρα μηδενὶ εἴπῃς ἀλλὰ ὕπαγε σεαυτὸν δεῖξον
τῷ ἱερεῖ καὶ προσένεγκον τὸ δῶρον ὃ προσέταξεν Μωυσῆς εἰς μαρτύριον αὐτοῖς

In the King James Version of the Bible the text reads:

And Jesus saith unto him, See thou tell no man; but go thy way, shew thyself
to the priest, and offer the gift that Moses commanded, for a testimony unto them.

The English Standard Version translates the passage as:

And Jesus said to him, “See that you say nothing to anyone, but go, show yourself
to the priest and offer the gift that Moses commanded, for a proof to them.”

== Analysis ==
One issue with this verse is that Matthew 8:1 has large crowds surrounding Jesus, which seems to contradict the pledge to secrecy. This verse is paralleled at Mark 1:44-45, but Mark does not begin his narrative with crowds present and the author of Matthew may not have reconciled the verses when copying from Mark. The Messianic Secret is an ongoing theme in the Gospel of Mark, but Matthew seems to care less about this issue, dropping several of the commands to secrecy from his narrative.

Leviticus 13 and 14 regulate that it is a priest who may pronounce someone clean or unclean. The visit to a priest is necessary after being cleansed for the leper to be readmitted to society. Local priests were found throughout the Jewish areas, but to make sacrifice the leper would have to travel to the Temple in Jerusalem.

Early commentators, such as John Chrysostom, read the leper providing evidence of the miracle as an attack on the Jewish establishment, defiant proof of Jesus' divinity to the establishment. More likely the verse is meant as positive proof that the leper is healed and that he is following the proper laws.

== Commentary from the Church Fathers ==
Chrysostom: Jesus when healing his body bids him tell no man; Jesus saith unto him, See thou tell no man. Some say that He gave this command that they might not through malice distrust his cure. But this is said foolishly, for He did not so cure him as that his purity should be called in question; but He bids him tell no man, to teach that He does not love ostentation and glory. How is it then that to another to whom He had healed He gives command to go and tell it? What He taught in that was only that we should have a thankful heart; for He does not command that it should be published abroad, but that glory should be given to God. (Mark 5:19.) He teaches us then through this leper not to be desirous of empty honour; by the other, not to be ungrateful, but to refer all things to the praise of God.

Jerome: And in truth what need was there that he should proclaim with his mouth what was evidently showed in his body?

Hilary of Poitiers: Or that this healing might be sought rather than offered, therefore silence is enjoined.

Jerome: He sends him to the Priests, first, because of His humility that He may seem to defer to the Priests; secondly, that when they saw the leper cleansed they might be saved, if they would believe on the Saviour, or if not that they might be without excuse; and, lastly, that He might not seem, as He was often charged, to be infringing the Law.

Chrysostom: He neither every were broke, nor everywhere observed, the Law, but sometimes the one, sometimes the other. The one was preparing the way for the wisdom that was to come, the other was silencing the irreverent tongue of the Jews, and condescending to their weakness. Whence the Apostles also are seen sometimes observing, sometimes neglecting, the Law.

Adamantius (Pseudo-Origen): Or, He sends him to the Priests that they might know that he was not cleansed according to the manner of the Law, but by the operation of grace.

Jerome: It was ordained in the Law, that those that had been cleansed of a leprosy should offer gifts to the Priests; as it follows, And offer thy gift as Moses commanded for a testimony to them.

Pseudo-Chrysostom: Which is not to be understood, Moses commanded it for a testimony to them; but, Go thou and offer for a testimony.

Chrysostom: For Christ, knowing beforehand that they would not profit by this, said not, ‘for their amendment,’ but, for a testimony to them; that is, for an accusation of them, and in attestation that all things that should have been done by Me, have been done. But though He thus knew that they would not profit by it, yet He did not omit any thing that behoved to be done; but they remained in their former ill-will. Also He said not, ‘The gift that I command,’ but, that Moses commanded, that in the meantime He might hand them over to the Law, and close the mouths of the unjust. That they might not say that He usurped the honour of the Priests, He fulfilled the work of the Law, and made a trial of them.

Adamantius (Pseudo-Origen): Or; offer thy gift, that all who see may believe the miracle.

Pseudo-Chrysostom: Or; He commands the oblation, that should they afterwards seek to put him out, he might be able to say, You have received gifts on my cleansing, how do ye now cast me out as a leper?

Hilary of Poitiers: Or we may read, Which Moses commanded for a testimony; inasmuch as what Moses commanded in the Law is a testimony, not an effect.

Bede: Should any be perplexed how, when the Lord seems here to approve Moses’ offering, the Church does not receive it, let him remember, that Christ had not yet offered His body for a holocaust. And it behoved that the typical sacrifices should not be taken away, before that which they typified was established by the testimony of the Apostles’ preaching, and by the faith of the people believing. By this man was figured the whole human race, for he was not only leprous, but, according to the Gospel of Luke, is described as full of leprosy. For all have sinned, and need glory of God; (Rom. 3:23.) to wit, that glory, that the hand of the Saviour being stretched out, (that is, the Word being made flesh,) and touching human nature, they might be cleansed from the vanity of their former ways; and that they that had been long abominable, and cast out from the camp of God's people, might be restored to the temple and the priest, and be able to offer their bodies a living sacrifice to Him to whom it is said, Thou art a Priest for ever. (Ps. 110:4.)

Saint Remigius: Morally; by the leper is signified the sinner; for sin makes an unclean and impure soul; he falls down before Christ when he is confounded concerning his former sins; yet he ought to confess, and to seek the remedy of penitence; so the leper shows his disease, and asks a cure. The Lord stretches out His hand when He affords the aid of Divine mercy; whereupon follows immediately remission of sin; nor ought the Church to be reconciled to the same, but on the sentence of the Priest.

Preceded by Matthew 8:3	Gospel of Matthew; Chapter 8	Succeeded by Matthew 8:5
