= Matthew 8:2 =

- ← 8:1 8:3 →
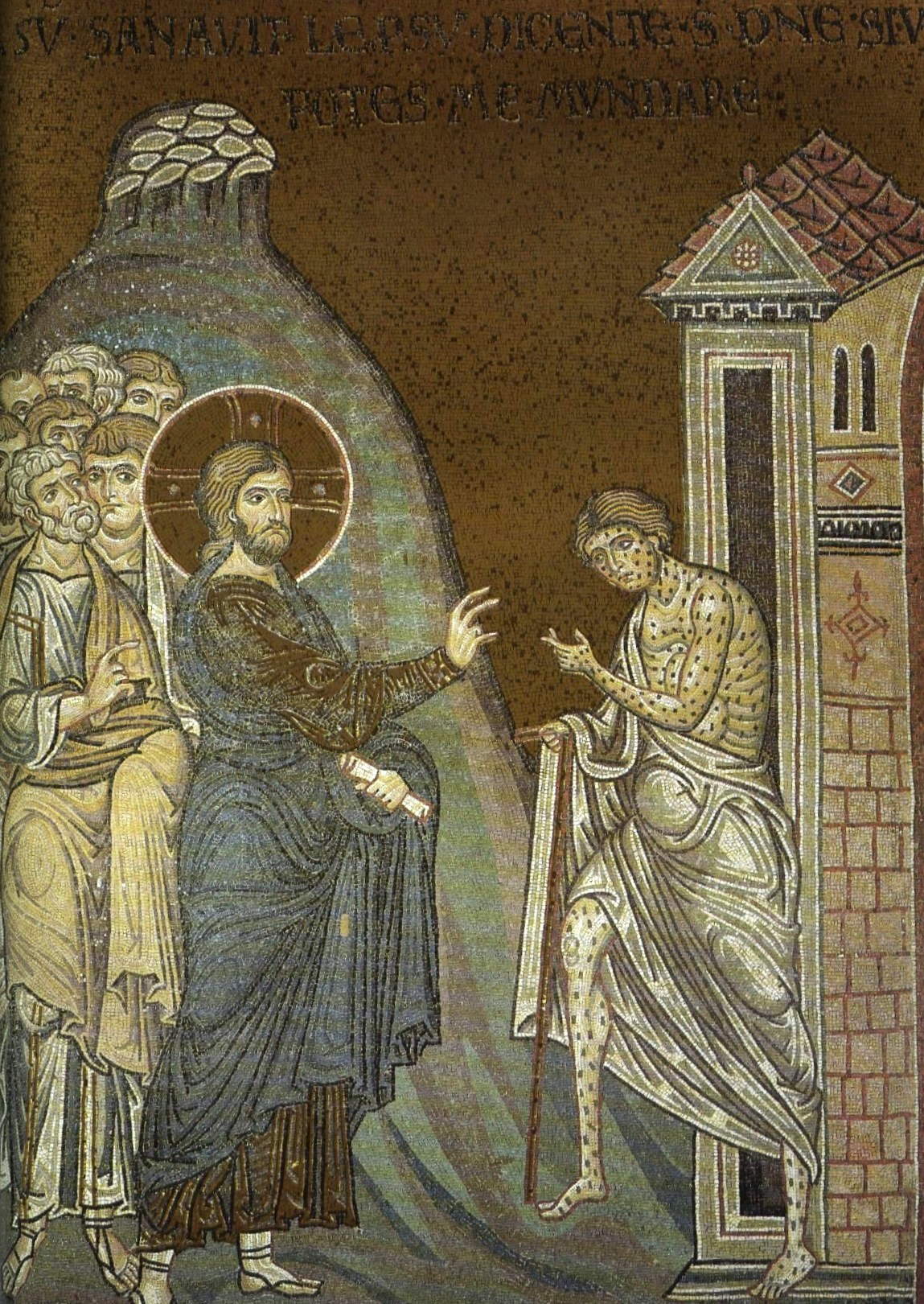
- A medieval mosaic of Christ and the Leper
- Book: Gospel of Matthew
- Christian Bible part: New Testament

Matthew 8:2 is the second verse of the eighth chapter of the Gospel of Matthew in the New Testament. This verse begins the miracle story of Jesus cleansing a leper, the first of a series of miracles in Matthew.

== Content ==
In the original Greek according to Westcott-Hort this verse is:

καὶ ἰδοὺ λεπρὸς προσέλθων προσεκύνει αὐτῷ
λέγων κύριε ἐὰν θέλῃς δύνασαί με καθαρίσαι

In the King James Version of the Bible the text reads:

And, behold, there came a leper and worshipped him,
saying, Lord, if thou wilt, thou canst make me clean.

The English Standard Version translates the passage as:

And behold, a leper came to him and knelt before him,
saying, “Lord, if you will, you can make me clean.”

== Analysis ==
This verse provides a rapid introduction to the story of the miracle. Where and when it is happening is not told, nor is any information on the leper, including his name. This is a common structure in miracle literature of the time. While the disease is universally translated as leprosy, it does not refer to the disease as today defined, but rather to any skin condition. Those with such conditions were generally shunned and excluded from society.

"And behold" is a phrase that Matthew uses often to emphasize the importance of a section, often using it to begin miracles. Matthew also adds lord to his version, again emphasizing the importance of Jesus. Lord in Matthew is only used by disciples and followers of Jesus, it was not a term of general politeness.

This story of the Leper occurs in both Mark and Luke, with this verse being paralleled by both Mark 1:40 and Luke 5:12. Of much interest to scholars is that Lord appears in both Matthew and Luke, but not in Mark. This contradicts the generally accepted Two-source hypothesis. These matching changes imply that Luke was working from Matthew, or that they both may have been working from an edition of Mark that differs from the standard one now extant. Davies and Allison don't put much weight on this evidence, noting that both Matthew and Luke add the word Lord to their narratives, and may very well have coincidentally done so here.

Kneeling before someone or something in scripture is a regular motif for worship and adoration, and Matthew has 41 other figures do so over the course of the gospel. It implies that Jesus is a figure for adoration, on a level equal with the Temple. The leper does not ask Jesus to ask God to heal him, but rather asks Jesus himself, evidence the advanced Christology in Matthew.

== Commentary from the Church Fathers ==
Pseudo-Chrysostom: Among others who were not able to ascend into the mount was the leper, as bearing the burden of sin; for the sin of our souls is a leprosy. And the Lord came down from the height of heaven, as from a mountain, that He might purge the leprousness of our sin; and so the leper as already prepared meets Him as He came down.

Adamantius (Pseudo-Origen): He works the cures below, and does none in the mount; for there is a time for all things under heaven, a time for teaching, and a time for healing. On the mount He taught, He cured souls, He healed hearts; which being finished, as He came down from the heavenly heights to heal bodies, there came to Him a leper and made adoration to Him; before he made his suit, he began to adore, showing his great reverence.

Pseudo-Chrysostom: He did not ask it of Him as of a human physician, but adored Him as God. For faith and confession make a perfect prayer; so that the leprous man in adoring fulfilled the work of faith, and the work of confession in words, he made adoration to him, saying;

Adamantius (Pseudo-Origen): Lord, by Thee all things were made, Thou therefore, if thou will, canst make me clean. Thy will is the work, and all works are subject to Thy will. Thou of old cleansedst Naaman the Syrian of his leprosy by the hand of Elisha, and now, if thou will, thou canst make me clean.

Chrysostom: He said not, If Thou wilt ask of God, or, If Thou wilt make adoration to God; but, If thou wilt. Nor did he say, Lord, cleanse me; but left all to Him, thereby making Him Lord, and attributing to Him the power over all.

Pseudo-Chrysostom: And thus he rewarded a spiritual Physician with a spiritual reward; for as physicians are gained by money, so He with prayer. We offer to God nothing more worthy than faithful prayer. In that he says, If thou wilt, there is no doubt that Christ's will is ready to every good work; but only doubt whether that cure would be expedient for him, because soundness of body is not good for all. If thou wilt then is as much as to say, I believe that Thou wiliest whatever is good, but I know not if this that I desire for myself is good.

Preceded by Matthew 8:1	Gospel of Matthew; Chapter 8	Succeeded by Matthew 8:3
