= Matthew 8:3 =

- ← 8:2 8:4 →
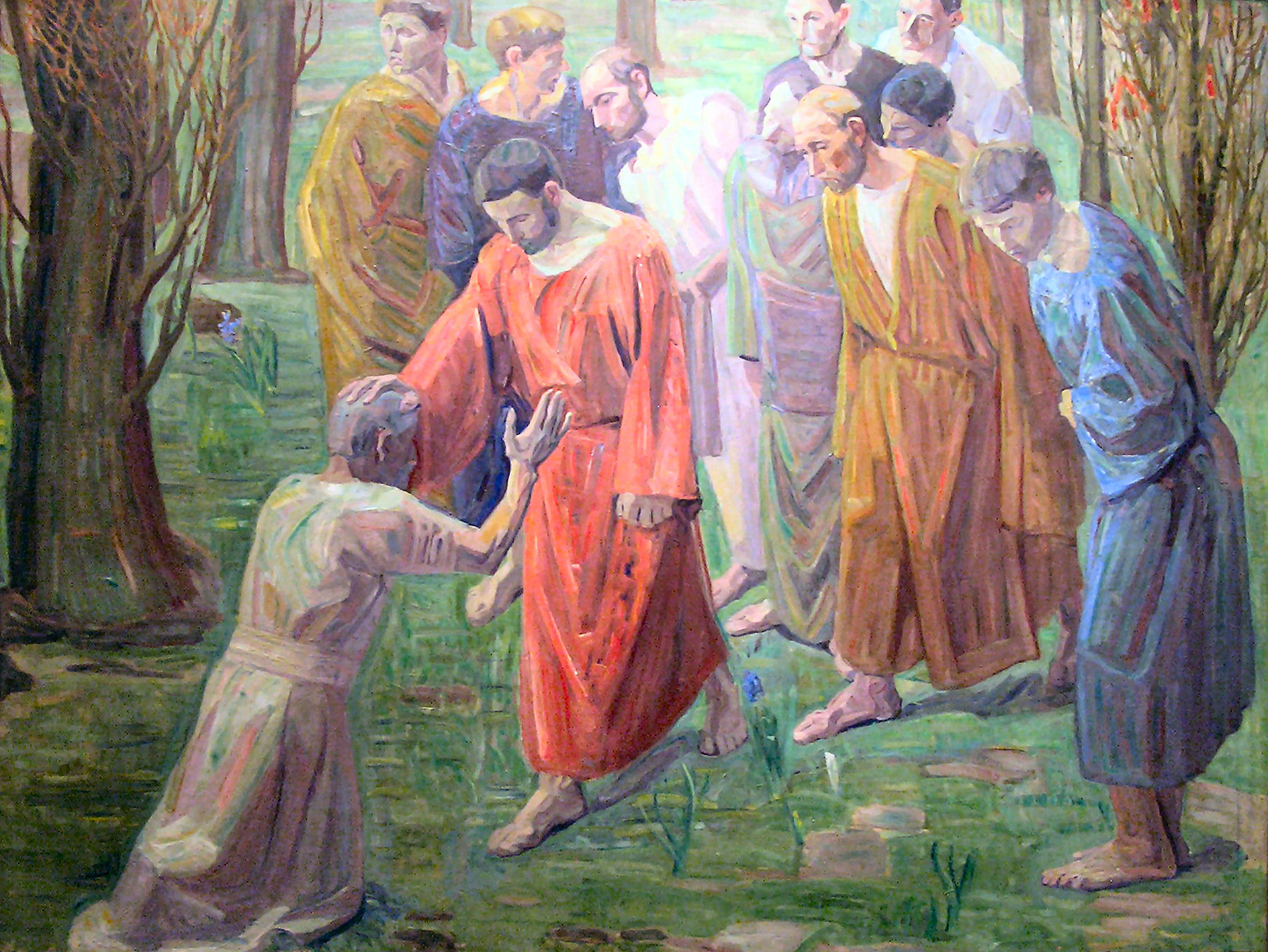
- Niels Larsen Stevns's 1913 depiction of Jesus curing the leper
- Book: Gospel of Matthew
- Christian Bible part: New Testament

Matthew 8:3 is the third verse of the eighth chapter of the Gospel of Matthew in the New Testament. This verse continues the miracle story of Jesus cleansing a leper, the first of a series of miracles in Matthew.

== Content ==
In the original Greek according to Westcott-Hort this verse is:

καὶ ἐκτείνας τὴν χεῖρα ἥψατο αὐτοῦ λέγων θέλω
καθαρίσθητι καὶ εὐθέως ἐκαθαρίσθη αὐτοῦ ἡ λέπρα

In the King James Version of the Bible the text reads:

And Jesus put forth his hand, and touched him, saying, I will;
be thou clean. And immediately his leprosy was cleansed.

The English Standard Version translates the passage as:

And Jesus stretched out his hand and touched him, saying, "I will;
be clean." And immediately his leprosy was cleansed.

For a collection of other versions see BibleHub Matthew 8:3.

== Analysis ==
The events in this verse are paralleled in Mark 1:41, with the notable change that Mark has Jesus acting because he pitied the leper. Matthew removes the emotional motivation, throughout his gospel Jesus' emotions are only rarely mentioned, reducing the references to the humanity of Jesus. Davies and Allison reject the idea that growing reverence caused the author of Matthew to limit Jesus' emotions, and the later Gospel of John makes frequent reference to Jesus' feelings.

Stretching out a hand is an expression that occurs some 80 times in the LXX version of the Hebrew Bible, and the standard physical expression of healing and causing miracles. Pope Francis quotes this incident as an example of Jesus' preference, when he was healing someone, to do so "not from a distance but in close proximity". Touching the leper is seemingly in defiance of Leviticus 5:3 and touching an unclean leper would have made Jesus himself unclean. Keener argues that this is not a violation of the law, as Jesus is fulfilling it by his act of cleansing the leper.

Bede used this verse as a compact criticism of various heresies he perceived. "I will" disproves Photinus' view that Jesus is not divine; "be Clean" counters Arianism; and "touched him" denies the Manichaeism rejection of Jesus' physicality.

== Commentary from the Church Fathers ==
Chrysostom: He was able, to cleanse by a word, or even by mere will, but He put out His hand, He stretched forth his hand and touched him, to show that He was not subject to the Law, and that to the pure nothing is impure. Elisha truly kept the Law in all strictness, and did not go out and touch Naaman, but sends him to wash in Jordan. But the Lord shows that He does not heal as a servant, but as Lord heals and touches; His hand was not made unclean by the leprosy, but the leprous body was made pure by the holy hand. For He came not only to heal bodies, but to lead the soul to the true wisdom. As then He did not forbid to eat with unwashen hands, so here He teaches us that it is the leprosy of the soul we ought only to dread, which is sin, but that the leprosy of the body is no impediment to virtue.

Pseudo-Chrysostom: But though He transgressed the letter of the Law, He did not transgress its meaning. For the Law forbade to touch leprosy, because it could not hinder that the touch should not defile; therefore it meant not that lepers should not be healed, but that they that touched should not be polluted. So He was not polluted by touching the leprosy, but purified the leprosy by touching it.

John of Damascus: For He was not only God, but man also, whence He wrought Divine wonders by touch and word; for as by an instrument so by His body the Divine acts were done.

Chrysostom: But for touching the leprous man there is none that accuses Him, because His hearers were not yet seized with envy against Him.

Pseudo-Chrysostom: Had He healed him without speaking, who would know by whose power he had been healed? So the will to heal was for the sake of the leprous man; the word was for the sake of them that beheld, therefore He said, I will, be thou clean.

Jerome: It is not to be read, as most of the Latins think, ‘I will to cleanse thee;’ but separately, He first answers, I will, and then follows the command, be thou clean. The leper has said, If thou wilt; the Lord answers, I will; he first said, Thou canst make me clean; the Lord spake, Be thou clean.

Chrysostom: Nowhere else do we see Him using this word though He be working ever so signal a miracle; but He here adds, I will, to confirm the opinion of the people and the leprous man concerning His power. Nature obeyed the word of the Purifier with proper speed, whence it follows, and straight his leprosy was cleansed. But even this word straightway is too slow to express the speed with which the deed was done.

Adamantius (Pseudo-Origen): Because he was not slow to believe, his cure is not delayed; he did not linger in his confession, Christ did not linger in His cure.

Augustine: Luke has mentioned the cleansing of this leper, though not in the same order of events, but as his manner is to recollect things omitted, and to put first things that were done later, as they were divinely suggested; so that what they had known before, they afterwards set down in writing when they were recalled to their minds.

Preceded by Matthew 8:2	Gospel of Matthew; Chapter 8	Succeeded by Matthew 8:4
