= Mark 1 =

- ← Matthew 28 Mark 2 →
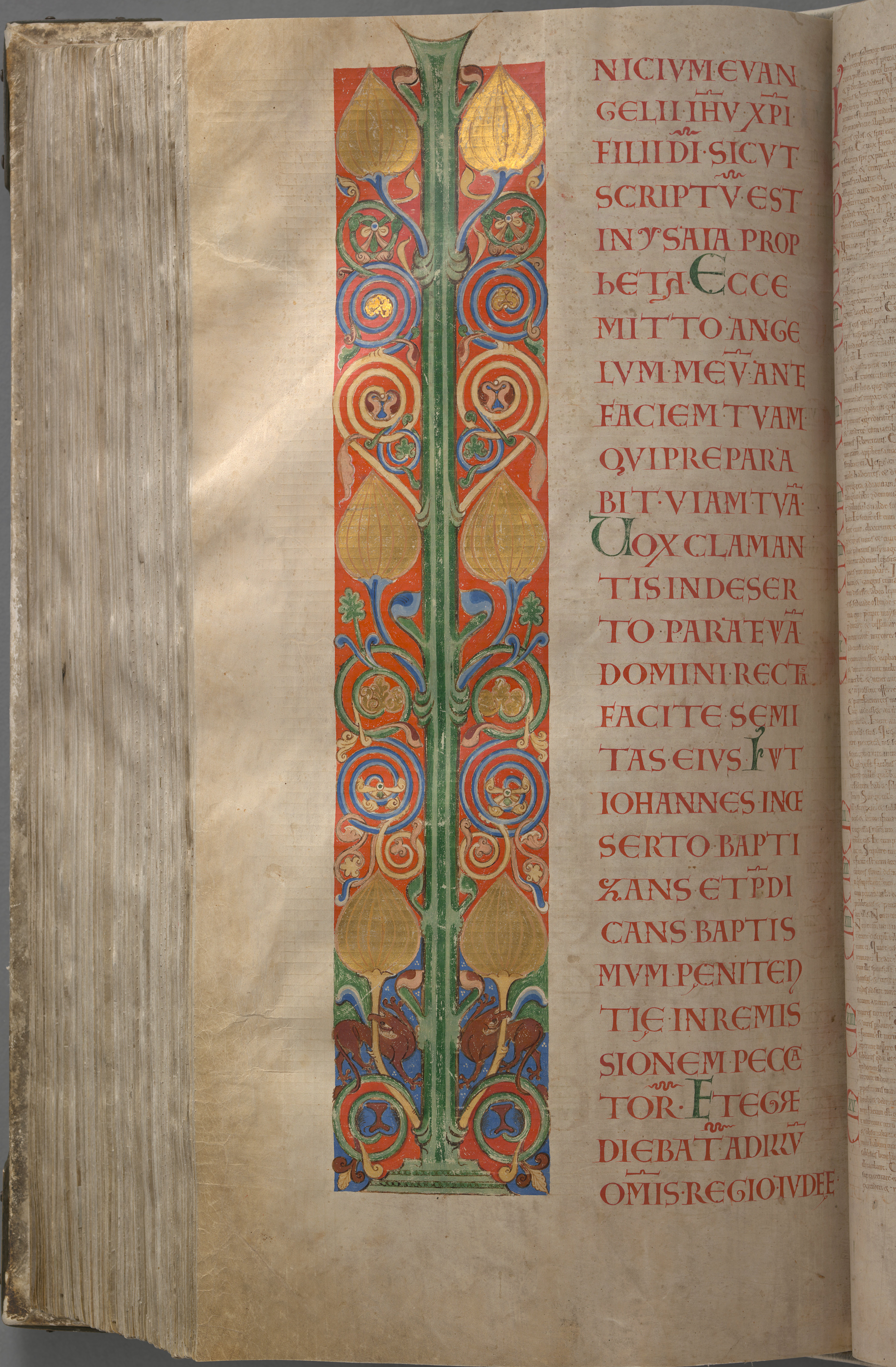
- Mark 1:1–5 (Latin) in Codex Gigas (13th century)
- Book: Gospel of Mark
- Category: Gospel
- Christian Bible part: New Testament
- Order in the Christian part: 2

Mark 1 is the first chapter of the Gospel of Mark in the New Testament of the Christian Bible. It recounts the proclamation of John the Baptist, the baptism of Jesus Christ, his temptations and the beginning of his ministry in Galilee.

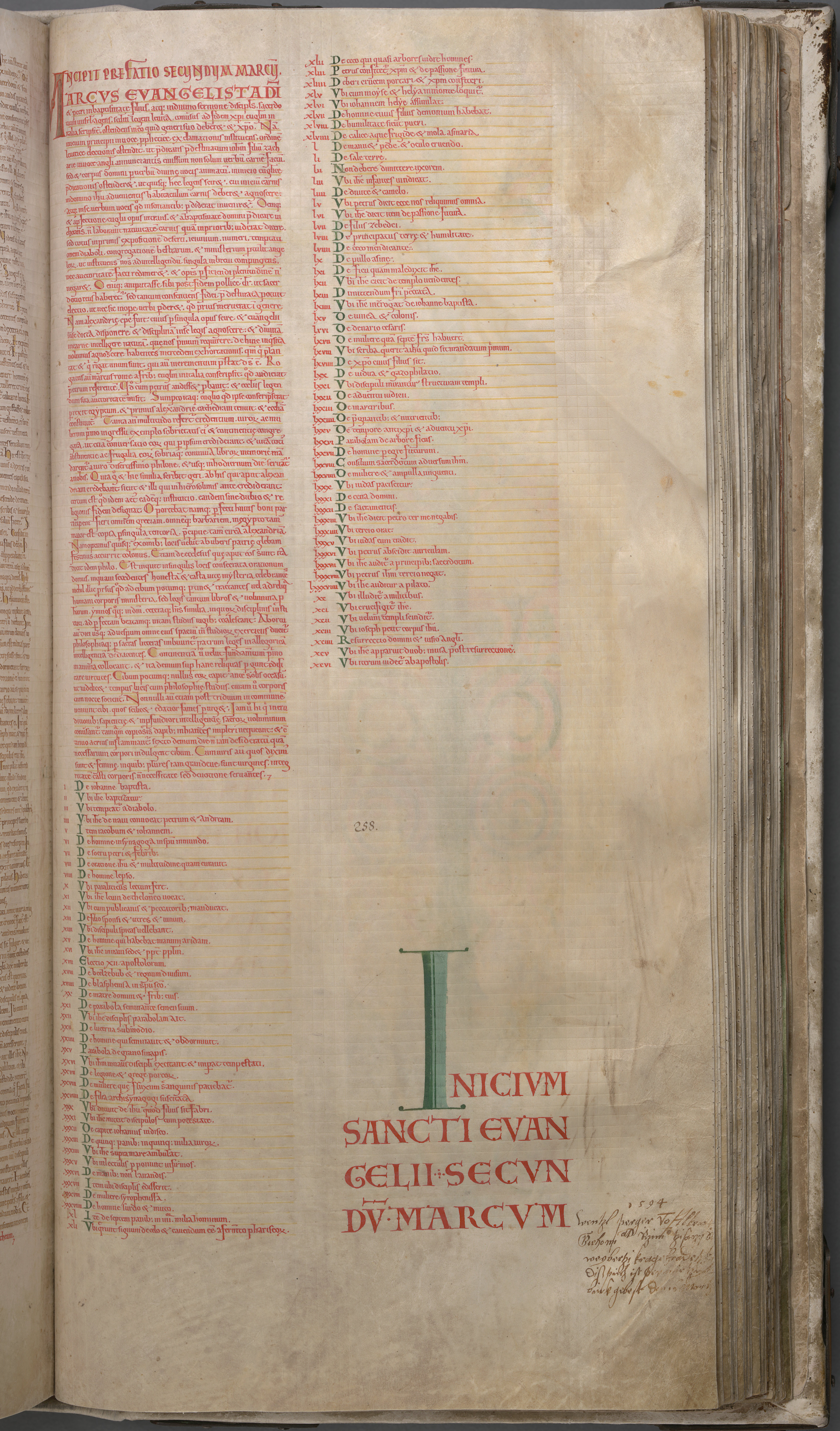
The preface of the Gospel of Mark in Codex Gigas (13th century)

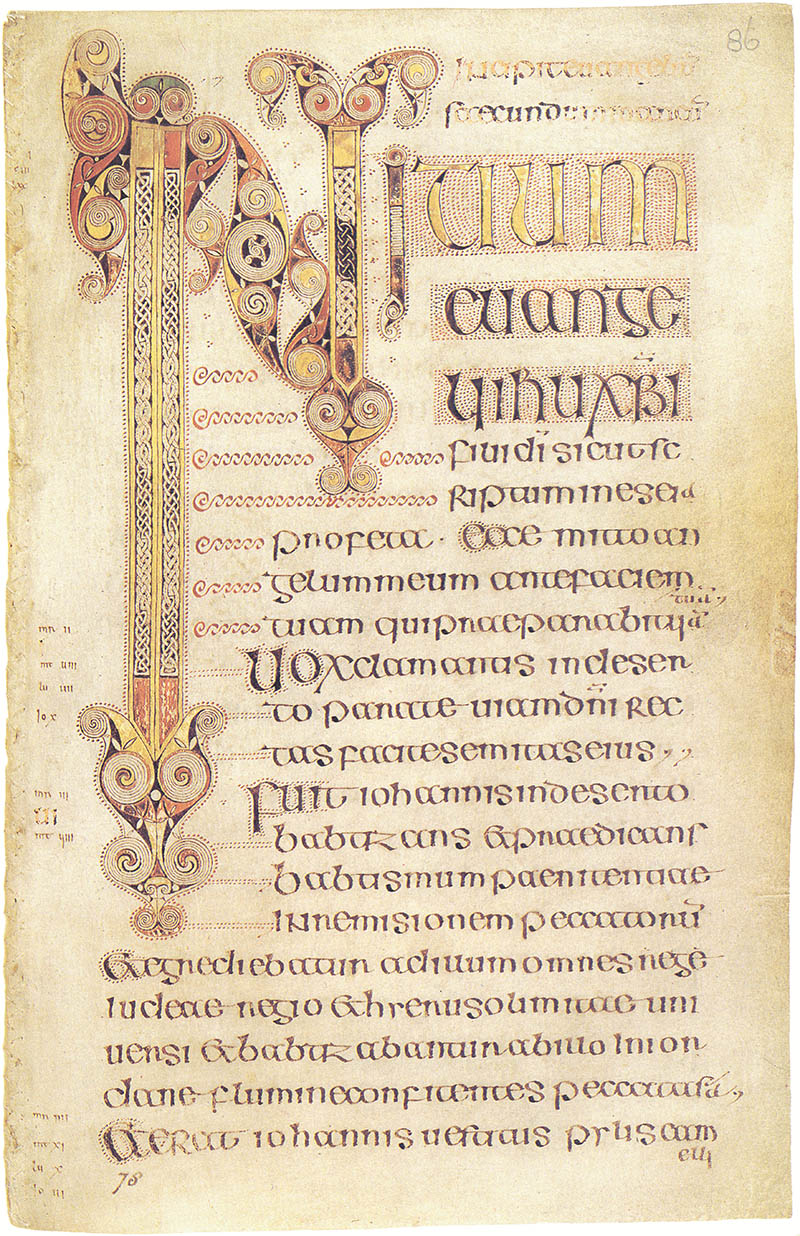
Image of page from the 7th century Book of Durrow, from The Gospel of Mark. Trinity College Dublin.

== Text ==
The original text was written in Koine Greek. This chapter is divided into 45 verses.

=== Textual witnesses ===
Some early manuscripts containing the text of this chapter are:

- Papyrus 137 (2nd/3rd century; extant verses 7–9, 16–18)
- Codex Vaticanus (325–350; complete)
- Codex Sinaiticus (330–360; omit verse 33)
- Codex Bezae (~400; complete)
- Codex Washingtonianus (~400; complete)
- Codex Alexandrinus (400–440; complete)
- Codex Ephraemi Rescriptus (~450; extant verses 18–45)

== Opening (verse 1) ==
The beginning of the gospel of Jesus Christ, the Son of God;

The opening verse of the Gospel of Mark sets out Mark's belief right from the start: Anglican Bishop Tom Wright describes this verse as "a great way to start". American academic Robert J. Miller translates it as "The good news of Jesus the Anointed", on the basis that χριστοῦ means "anointed" and the phrase υἱοῦ τοῦ θεοῦ is not present in some early manuscripts. Some older manuscripts (such as Codex Koridethi (Θ; 038), Minuscule 28) omit "Son of God", but Swedish theologian Tommy Wasserman through research concludes that the omission was accidental.

The "beginning" could refer to the beginning of the book, or the next verse, or the beginning of the story of Jesus, as Mark is only beginning to tell the reader about Jesus' life, not writing his entire biography.

By saying he is the anointed, Mark is declaring Jesus the Messiah, the successor to King David. Mark always uses "Christ" which is derived from the Greek translation, he never uses "Messias" (Strong's G3323 – Μεσσίας) which is derived from the Greek transliteration of the Aramaic word for "Messiah". "Son of God" can be seen as synonymous with a political messiah, in this case the King of the Jews, but can also be seen as expressing divinity, as in the phrase "God the Son". Only the demonic opponents of Jesus call him this in Mark until the centurion in Mark 15:39. The "good news" could refer to the news about Jesus or from Jesus or Jesus as the good news or a combination of them all.

Henry Barclay Swete's Introduction to the Old Testament in Greek, pages 456–457 states:

"Εὐαγγέλιον [Good news or Gospel] in the LXX occurs only in the plural, and perhaps only in the classical sense of 'a reward for good tidings' (2 Samuel 4:10 [also 18:20, 18:22, 18:25–27, 2 Kings 7:9]); in the NT it is from the first appropriated to the Messianic good tidings (Mark 1:1, 1:14), probably deriving this new meaning from the use of εὐαγγέλίζεσθαι in Isaiah 40:9, 52:7, 60:6, 61:1."

St Bede remarks on the contrast between Mark's opening verse and Matthew's first verse, where Jesus is described as "Jesus Christ, the Son of David, the Son of Abraham". Here he is called "the Son of God", but "from both we must understand one Lord Jesus Christ, Son of God, and of man".

== Announcement of the prophets ==
=== Verses 2–3 ===
^{2}As it is written in the Prophets:

"Behold, I send My messenger before Your face,
Who will prepare Your way before You."
^{3}"The voice of one crying in the wilderness:
"Prepare the way of the Lord;
Make His paths straight.'"

In the Greek texts of Mark edited by Westcott and Hort, Samuel Prideaux Tregelles and the Society of Biblical Literature, the prophecies quoted are described as being written "ἐν τῷ Ἠσαΐᾳ τῷ προφήτῃ" (en tō Ēsaia tō prophētē, "in the prophet Isaiah"), as they are in manuscripts B, D, L, Δ and א, whereas the Textus Receptus reads "ἐν τοῖς προφήταις" (en tois prophētais, "in the prophets") in line with many other ancient manuscripts and patristic writings.

Some think this might indicate that Mark did not use a complete Jewish Bible but instead used a general collection of quotations from them. Protestant theologian Heinrich Meyer suggests that the reference to Isaiah is authentic but it was a "mistake of memory". The quote appears to be a composite from the books of Exodus (23:20), Malachi (3:1) and Isaiah (40:3), linking the gospel of Jesus with a fulfillment of the "Old Testament". Mark assumes they refer to John the Baptist or applies them to him.

The passage from Malachi describes one who will prepare the way of God for God. Mark has changed the statement of Malachi, which refers to Elijah returning to prepare God's way, to one in which John is seen as Elijah, because the spirit of Elijah rested on him and "my" way has been changed to "your" way, i.e. Jesus' way. Mark thus might be equating Jesus with God.

In more detail, it appears Mark has taken part of Exodus 23:20 of the Septuagint: ἰδοὺ ἐγὼ ἀποστέλλω τὸν ἄγγελόν μου πρὸ προσώπου σου (Brenton Ex 23:20: "behold, I send my angel before thy face") and combined it with part of Malachi 3:1 of the Septuagint: ἐπιβλέψεται ὁδόν (Brenton Mal 3:1: "survey the way") to create Mark 1:2 in the Westcott-Hort Greek NT: ἰδοὺ ἀποστέλλω τὸν ἄγγελόν μου πρὸ προσώπου σου ὃς κατασκευάσει τὴν ὁδόν σου. The significant differences are ἐπιβλέψεται ("survey" – Brenton) is replaced with κατασκευάσει ("prepare" – NRSV) and a final σου ("your" – NRSV) has been added: "See, I am sending my messenger ahead of you, who will prepare your way" (Mark 1:2 in the NRSV). The following quote of Isaiah 40:3 is specifically from the Septuagint, compare Brenton Isa 40:3: "The voice of one crying in the wilderness, Prepare ye the way of the Lord, make straight the paths of our God." to the Masoretic Text 40:3: "Hark! one calleth: 'Clear ye in the wilderness the way of the LORD, make plain in the desert a highway for our God." or the NRSV 40:3: "A voice cries out: ‘In the wilderness prepare the way of the Lord, make straight in the desert a highway for our God." or the new JPS Tanakh (1985) 40:3: "A voice rings out: Clear in the desert A road for the Lord! Level in the wilderness A highway for our God!"

All four gospels use the quote from Septuagint Isaiah: it is in Luke in Luke 3:4–6, Matthew in Matthew 3:3, and John in John 1:23. This section of Isaiah is about the return journey home from the Babylonian captivity and was a passage Jews often used as a way of expressing the help of God. Isaiah probably uses this passage symbolically to describe moral cleansing and renewal. Thus John is linked to Isaiah as well and once again Mark equates the lord of this passage, Yahweh, with Jesus.

== John the Baptist ==
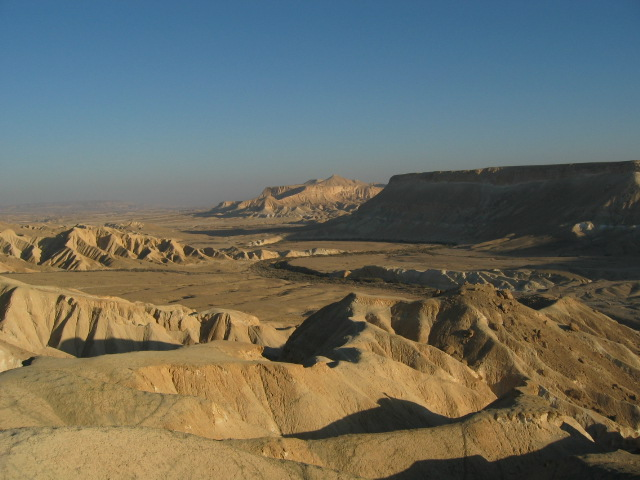
Sand Mountains in the Negev

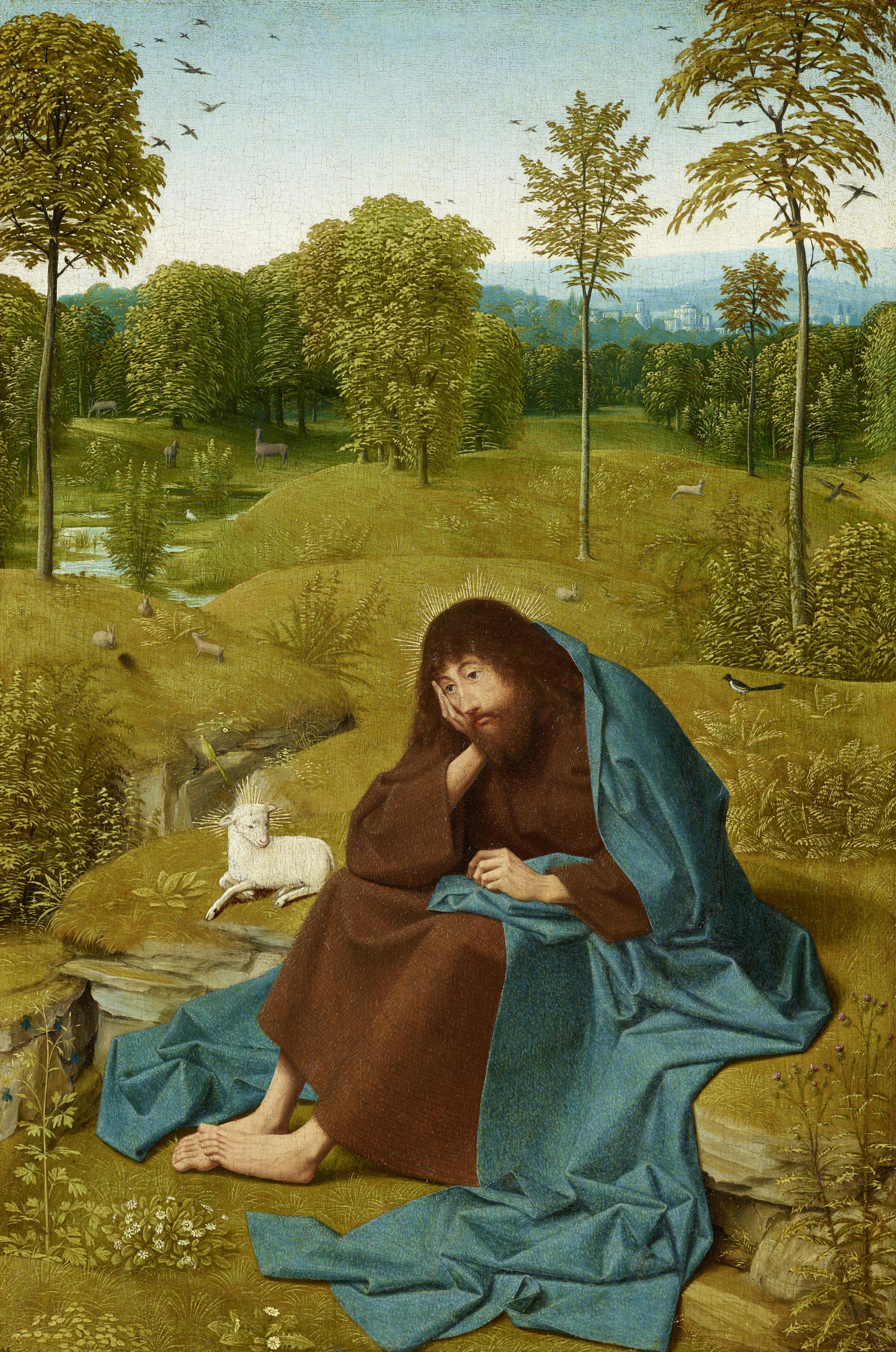
John the Baptist in the Wilderness by Geertgen tot Sint Jans

Mark describes John's activities, preaching repentance and forgiveness of sins and baptising in the Jordan River. He says he wore camel hair, a leather belt, and survived on locusts and wild honey. His clothes resemble Elijah's as described in 2 Kings 1:8. There is also the prophecy of true prophet's clothing in the Book of Zechariah 13:4. His diet may have been his attempt at purity. There has been much speculation that John was an Essene, perhaps also Jesus, but there is no hard evidence either way. According to Luke, Jesus and John were relatives (Luke 1:36) and John is described as being a Nazarite from birth (Luke 1:15). All portraits of him paint him as certainly an ascetic, but also as a popular and respected preacher.

This portrait of John is somewhat the same but somewhat different from the one Josephus gives us. Josephus states that John baptized, but not for the forgiveness of sins and that he was a great leader of the people, making no mention of Jesus regarding John. This difference might show how Mark views John, as a representative of Elijah and merely the herald of who Mark deems the more important, Jesus. According to the Q hypothesis John baptising was also found at the beginning of that book as well. John is revered in Mandaeism.

Many people from Judea and (or 'including') Jerusalem come to confess their sins and be baptised by John. Lutheran pietist Johann Bengel makes the point that "capital cities are [often] not readily wont to follow a new institution [a new mode of life preached for the first time]".

John tells them, "After me will come one more powerful than I, the thongs of whose sandals I am not worthy to stoop down and untie. I baptize you with water, but he will baptize you with the Holy Spirit." Untying someone's sandals was a task commonly done by someone's slave. What baptising with the Holy Spirit refers to, as Jesus never baptises in Mark, is uncertain if one only considers Mark. John 4:1–3 has Jesus' disciples (but not Jesus) baptising at the same time as John the Baptist. (See also Paraclete, Acts 1:5, 1:8, 2:4, 2:38). Matthew 3:11 and Luke 3:16 specify baptism with holy spirit and fire.

=== Verse 7 ===
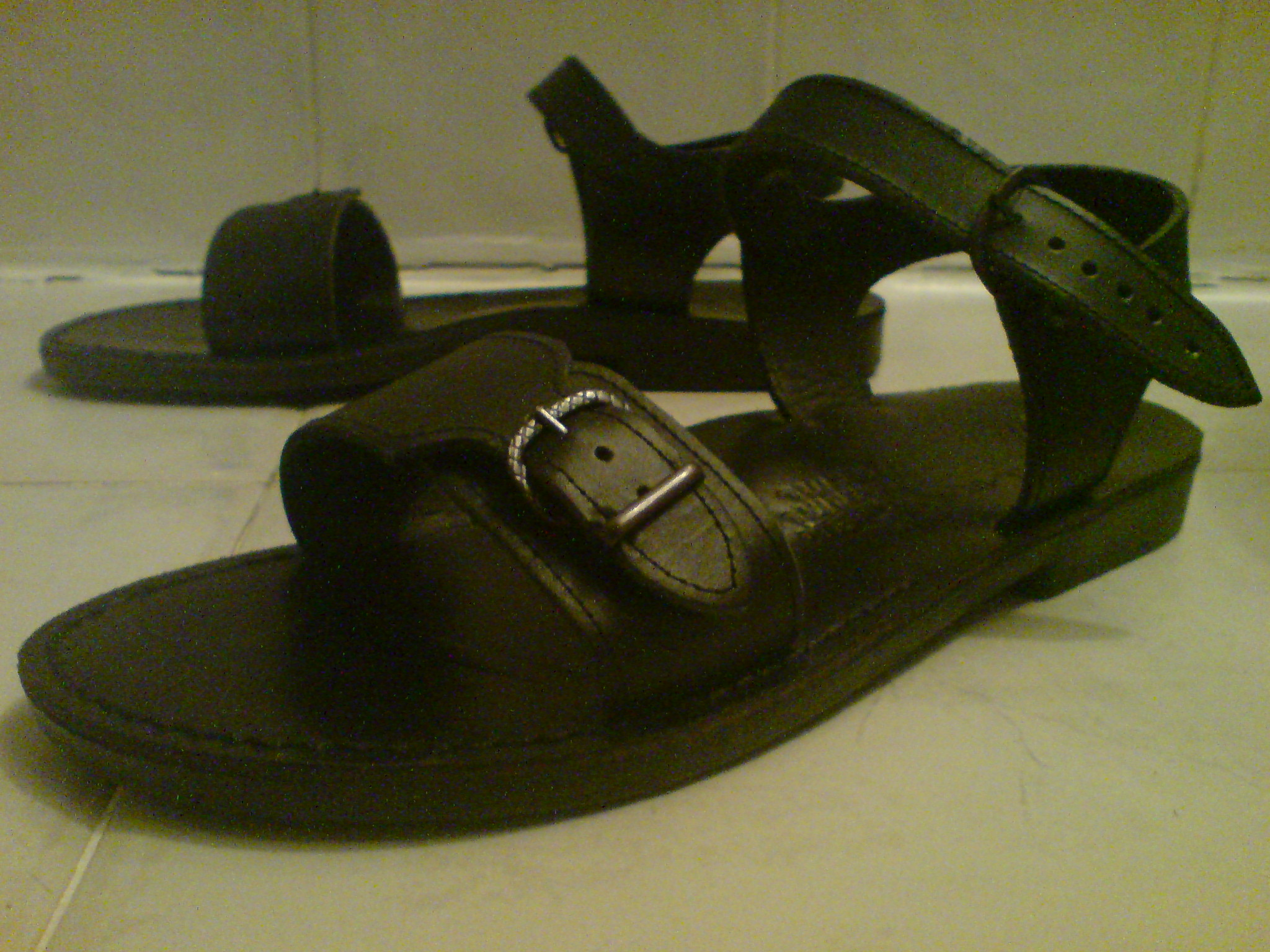
Sandals with modern straps, but of a similar style to the sandals worn in Roman times

And he preached, saying,

"There comes One after me who is mightier than I, whose sandal strap I am not worthy to stoop down and loose."

This expression "to stoop down" is peculiar to Mark's Gospel.

=== Verse 8 ===
"I indeed baptized you with water, but He will baptize you with the Holy Spirit."

Some see John's statement patterned on the Book of Exodus, in Exodus 23:20. Other books used this pattern to describe other prophets, such as Hosea in Hosea 2:14 and 12:9. John refers to his baptism in the past tense (aorist), Greek: ἐγὼ ἐβάπτισα ὑμᾶς, but some versions translate this statement in the present tense, I baptize you.

A 1980's theological collaboration called the Jesus Seminar concluded that this was one of the authentic ("red") acts of Jesus, recorded in Mark 1:1–8, Matthew 3:1–12, Luke 3:1–20, Gospel of the Ebionites 1, and which it calls "A voice in the wilderness".

== Jesus' baptism and temptation ==
Appearance of Christ to the People, by Alexander Ivanov, 1837–57

Jesus is one of the many who come to be baptised, in his case from Nazareth in Galilee. Since John, according to Mark, baptised repentance for the forgiveness of sins (Mark 1:4) some have argued Jesus also is coming to be forgiven for his sins; but Mark notes that John says that he is unworthy (Mark 1:7–8). Mark also has John's function as preparing the way for Jesus, and some argue this baptism is meant to forward the fulfillment of Jesus' plan. John 1:31 has John say his baptism was his method of revealing Jesus to Israel. Perhaps Jesus is doing this to embrace the doctrine of baptism and repentance of sins and his oneness with those who embrace it. The Epistle to the Hebrews, in Hebrews 4:15, says Jesus was "just as we are — yet was without sin" and 1 John 3:4–5 states: "...sin is lawlessness; ... and in him there is no sin".

Mark introduces Jesus without a history or a description, suggesting the intended reader already has heard of him. Mark, like the other Gospels, gives no physical description of Jesus, unlike the short previous description of John. Mark's readers are assumed already to know about the two of them.

John baptizes him and Jesus then sees a theophany. He sees "heaven being torn open" (Greek: σχιζομένους, schizomenous, rent open), "and the spirit descending on him like a dove", and hears a voice telling him that he is God's son, whom God loves, and with whom God is well pleased. The vision could be related to Psalm 2:7, as well as Isaiah 42:1. The "opening of the heavens" is often seen as the union and beginning of communication between God and the world. Whether anyone else besides Jesus saw this has been often debated: Luke 3:22 says the Spirit descended in "bodily" form; John 1:32–34 says John said he saw the Spirit descend onto Jesus. Some have speculated that this event may have been a story that has its origins in the Early Christian practice of baptism, although Franciscan theologian Robert J. Karris argues that this is unlikely.

Some have argued that since Mark begins his story here, at the baptism, this could be seen as a form of adoption, as it is God's action which changed Jesus' life, although Mark is probably confirming their preexistent relationship. Jesus is never declared as God's adopted son anywhere in the book, but Mark does not exactly state how or when Jesus became God's son. Both Matthew and Luke use their infancy narratives to show that Jesus was God's son from the moment of conception, and John 1:1 has him as the word of God from the moment of creation.

The voice from heaven calls Jesus "beloved". Some see a relationship between this description and that of Isaac in Genesis 22, where Abraham had shown his devotion to God by being willing to sacrifice his son, so God shows his love for humanity by actually sacrificing his son, see also Substitutionary atonement. There is also the possible link with this and the beloved servant of God in Isaiah 42:1–7, 49:1–6, 50:4–11, and 52:13–53:12.

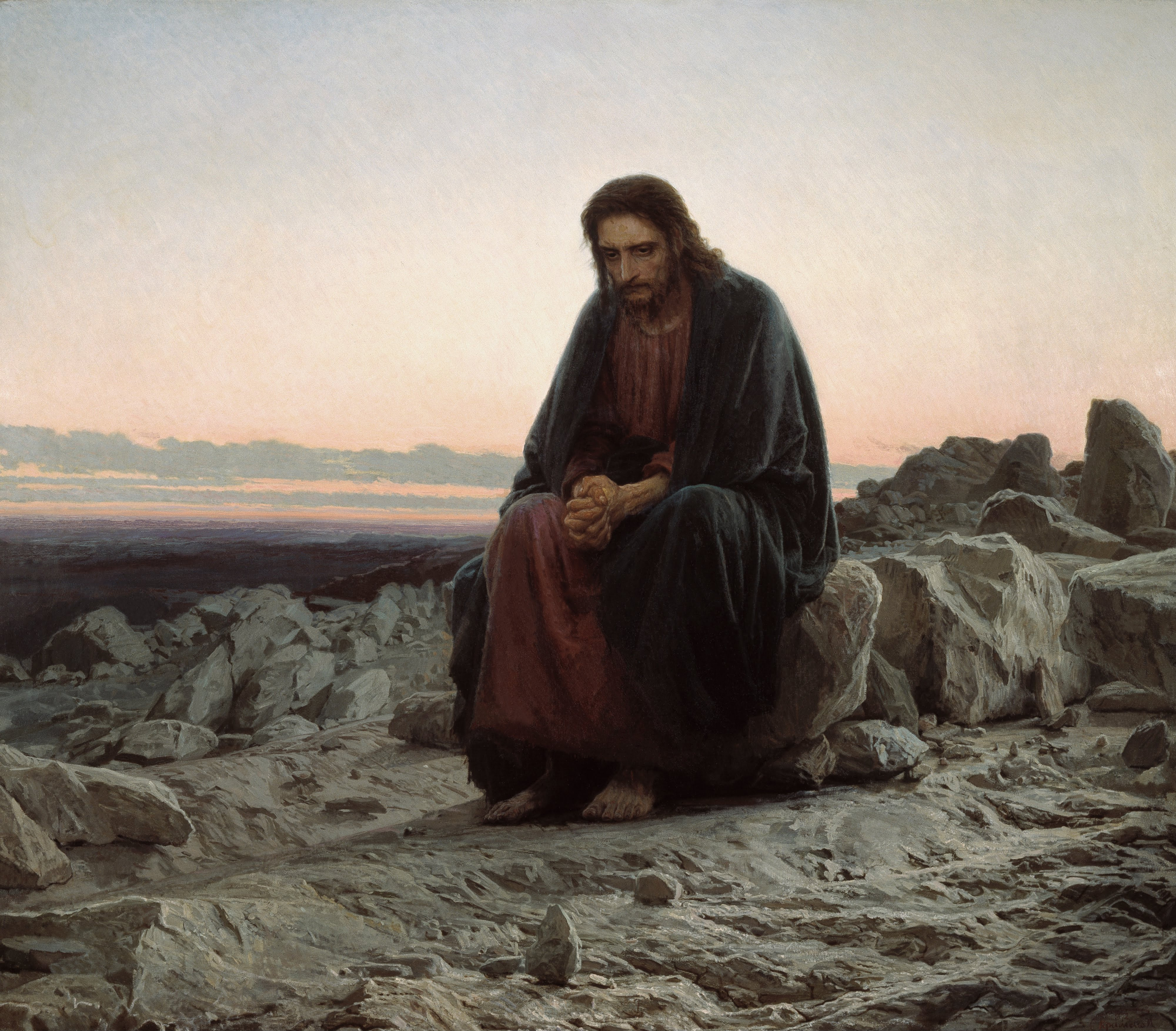
Christ in the desert by Ivan Kramskoi

The spirit then "at once", kai euthys, sends him out into the desert to be tempted by Satan for forty days. Forty is a common numerological device in the Bible, such as the forty days of the flood in Genesis 7 and the forty years of the Israelites wandering in the desert in Exodus. Elijah also spent forty days and nights travelling to Mount Horeb in 1 Kings 19:8. Unlike Matthew 4:1–11 and Luke 4:1–13 the number of temptations or what they were are not described. Mark does say that Angels came to minister to him. Karris argues that the angels and the wilderness are related to Psalm 91:11–13.

John is put into prison, presumably by Herod Antipas. Mark uses the term paradothēnai to describe John being "turned over", which Mark also uses to describe Jesus being arrested during his Passion. Mark has already highlighted two themes, Jesus' power from and favor of God, contrasted with his confrontation with Satan and John being arrested, showing his power and mission have already encountered the most extreme challenges both from the authorities of this world and supernatural powers.

The Jesus Seminar concluded that parts of these accounts were authentic ("red") acts of Jesus, specifically: "John baptizes Jesus": Mark 1:9–11, Matthew 3:13–17, Luke 3:21–22, Gospel of the Ebionites 4; and "Jesus proclaims the gospel": Mark 1:14–15.

== Calling of the four disciples ==
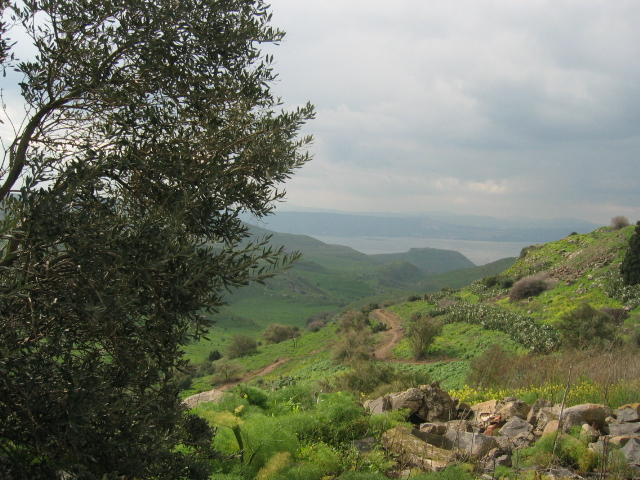
Landscape in northern Israel

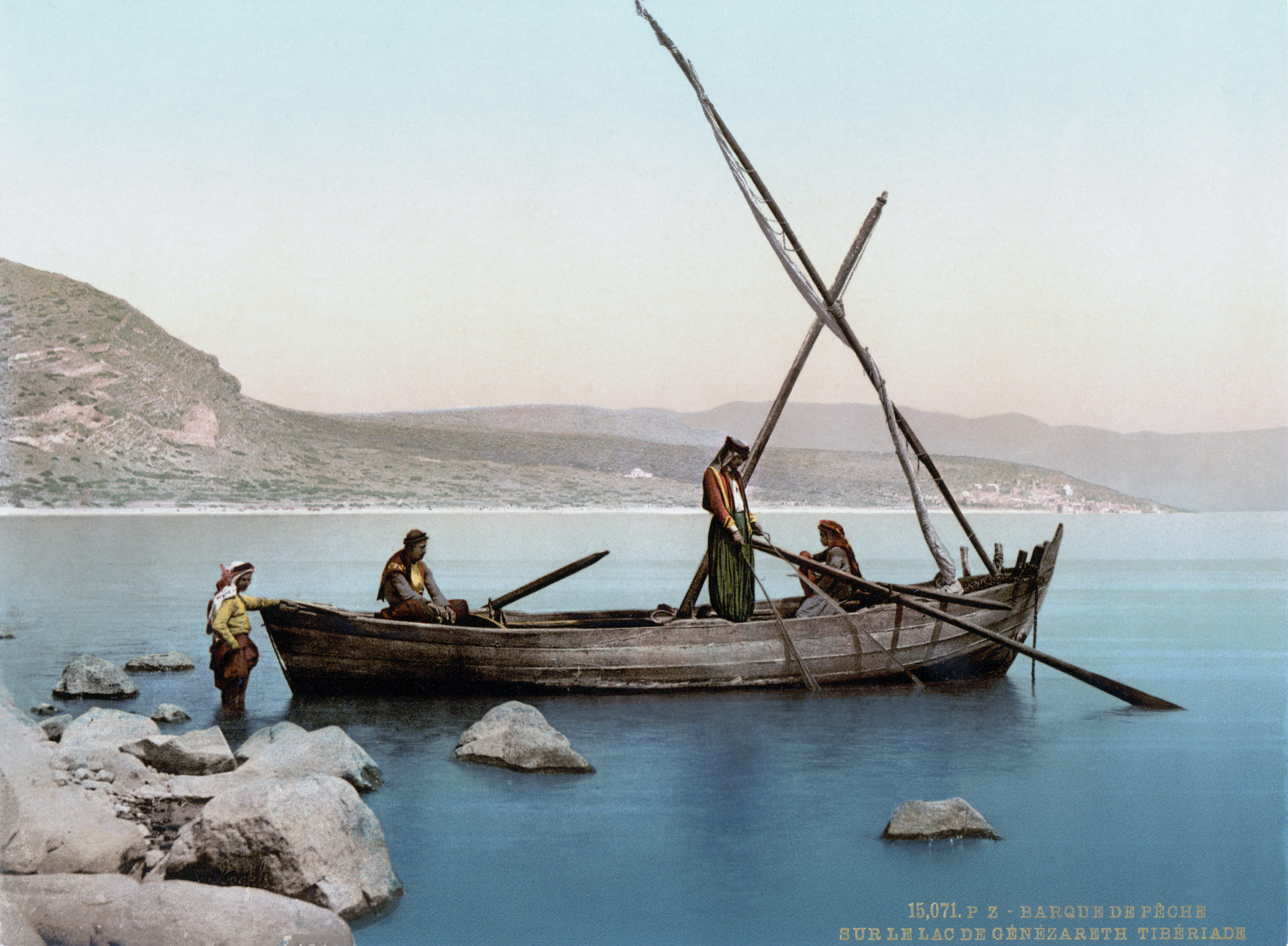
Fisherman in the Sea of Galilee, 1890–1900

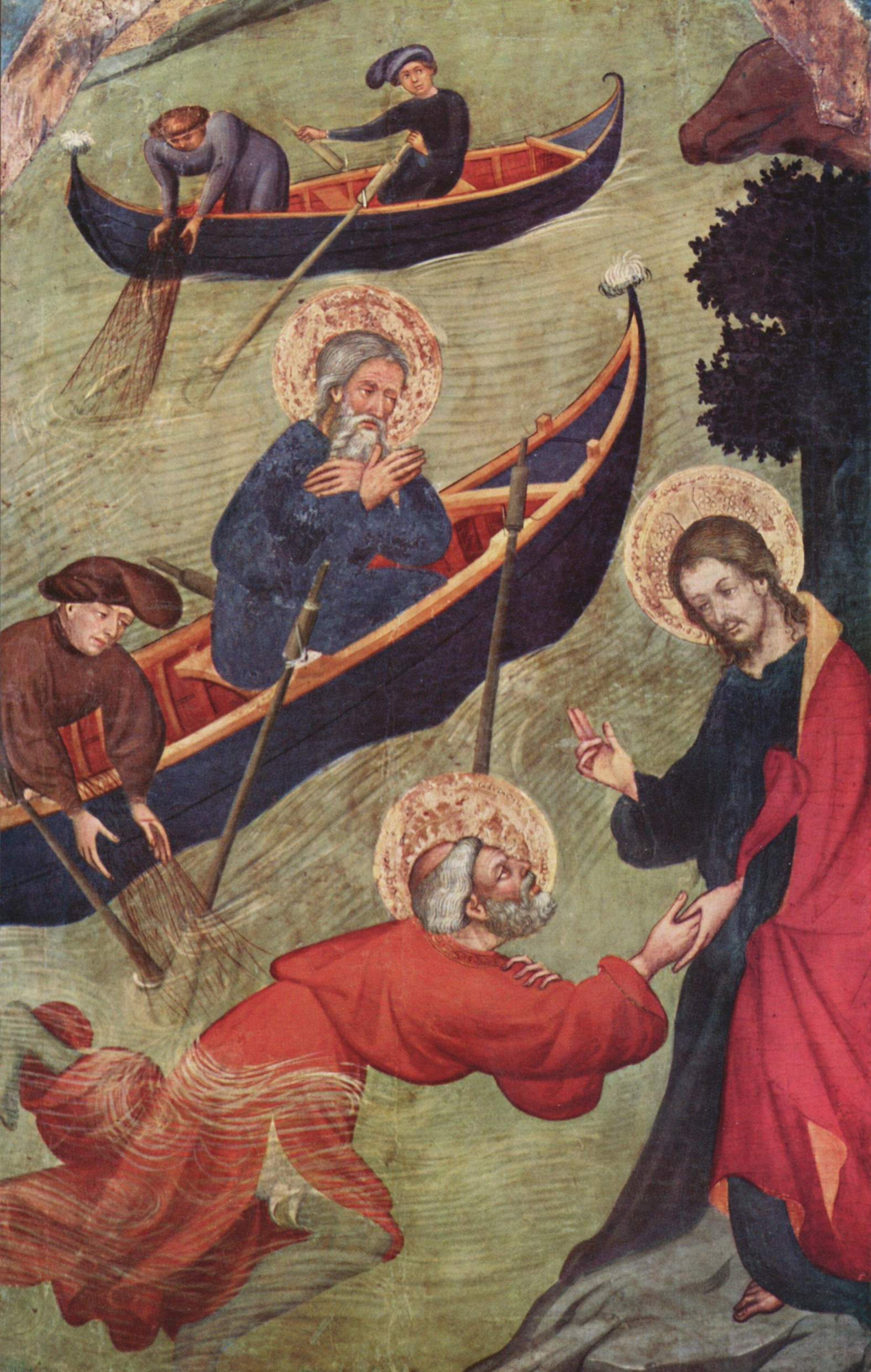
Petrusaltar: Jesus stutzt Petrus auf dem Wasser, Luis Borrassá, c. 1400

=== Verses 14–15 ===
^{14} Now after John was put in prison, Jesus came to Galilee, preaching the gospel of the kingdom of God,
^{15} and saying, "The time is fulfilled, and the kingdom of God is at hand. Repent, and believe in the gospel."

Mark explains the circumstances of John's imprisonment in Mark 6:17–18.

Jesus then goes into Galilee, preaching "The kingdom of God is near (ēngiken). Repent and believe in the gospel (euangelion)!" The "kingdom of God" is a major theme of Jesus' teaching and of subsequent debate among interpreters and scholars, with discussion often 'centering around the nature of the kingdom (whether earthly, heavenly, or both) and the kingdom's arrival (present, future, or both)', as well as the relationship between the kingdom of God and Jesus himself. The words "is at hand" may be read as "has drawn near" (NKJV), or "has come near" (ESV). The kingdom can be seen as a physical or spiritual place. It could also be translated as "God's imperial rule", indicating the power of God over all things. The gospel is seen as not just God's message but God's actions. Jesus here links the coming of God with the term ēngiken (Strong's G1448), which some see as meaning "near" as in "upcoming in the future" but others argue it means "near" as in Jesus himself is near and the coming of God has arrived. These are then linked with repentance, a change of heart, and then belief. Belief and repentance are thus what Jesus says God desires. See also Justification (theology).

Jesus goes to the Sea of Galilee and finds Simon (whom he will name Rock (Peter) in 3:16) and his brother Andrew. They are fishing, a large business then in Galilee. He speaks the famous phrase: "Come, follow me,...and I will make you fishers of men." Some have argued their status as fishermen is metaphorical, based perhaps on Jeremiah 16:16, but Karris argues that their occupations as fishermen was historical and related by Mark to show the costliness of being a disciple, as they had to leave a presumably thriving business. Andrew was a disciple of John the Baptist according to John. He only appears three times in Mark, here, and in Mark 3:18 and Mark 13:3. They follow him and then soon come upon James and John (whom he will name the Sons of Thunder in 3:17), who also quickly join the group, "they left their father Zebedee in the boat with the hired men". Peter, James, and John will play a prominent part in several incidents in the Gospel. Mark does not relate that Jesus convinced them to follow him in any way: he simply has them follow him without question. Kilgallen argues that historically this calling was not so sudden, with perhaps a prior meeting, but Mark has shortened it for extra effect to emphasize total devotion to Jesus. John's Gospel relates Jesus convincing Nathanael to join this group in John 1:43–51.

Mark says they had nets in Mark 1:16 and they and their father, Zebedee, employed other men in Mark 1:20. Karris argues this shows they had money and a high probability of being educated, with a knowledge of the Jewish Bible. Others point to Acts 4:13 to show that they were unschooled, but Karris argues against reading this too literally.

John 1:35–51 has Andrew and someone else who are with John the Baptist follow Jesus after John calls him the Lamb of God. They then bring Simon to Jesus, who gives him the Aramaic name Cephas, meaning Rock (Peter). Philip and Nathanael are then called secondly, not James and John. The calling of disciples is also found in Luke 5:1–11 and Matthew 4:18–22.

=== Verse 16 ===
And as He walked by the Sea of Galilee, He saw Simon and Andrew his brother casting a net into the sea; for they were fishermen.

Theologian Richard Bauckham makes several observations pertaining to the prominence of Simon Peter's name in the Gospel of Mark:

- The name is first mentioned in this verse.
- It is also the first among disciples' name to be noted
- Mark consistently uses 'Simon' until 3:16 when Jesus changes the name to 'Peter', which is since used more often until the last mention in Mark 16:7
- The appearance of 'Simon' (first time) in this verse and 'Peter' (last time) in Mark 16:7 form a literary inclusio of eyewitness testimony to indicate Peter as the main eyewitness source.

== Jesus in Capernaum and the tour of Galilee ==
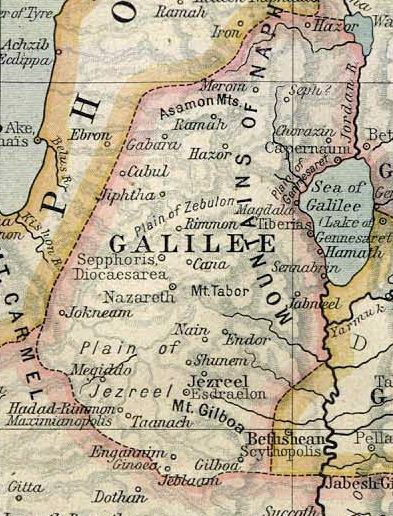
A 1923 map showing Galilee c. 50 AD. Capernaum is in the upper right while Nazareth is towards the centre.

Jesus and the four go to Capernaum, which Mark presents as Jesus's center of activity, and Jesus teaches in the synagogue on the sabbath. Eventually, at Mark 9:5, in recording the Transfiguration of Jesus, Mark uses the technical term ῥαββί, rhabbi, "rabbi", meaning a Jewish teacher of Mosaic Law (see also Rabboni). Gathering disciples (students) and teaching are thus the first part of what Jesus does to proclaim the kingdom of God. Mark does not relate what Jesus taught, which could mean he left it out because he did not deem it important enough for his book or because he did not know what Jesus taught there.

Some archaeologists believe a synagogue in Capernaum that has been excavated lies on top of the synagogue that existed at this time that would have been the one Jesus would have gone to. Anyone who showed a sufficient knowledge of the scriptures could preach in the synagogue. Mark says the people thought Jesus taught with "authority", which the scribes did not. The scribes would answer questions in a traditional, official manner, see also Pharisaic Principles and Values. Jesus in Mark operates on no authority but his own judgement. According to John 2 Jesus attended the Marriage at Cana before going to Capernaum.

He then performs an exorcism on a demon possessed man. Curing people, especially possessed people, will be another major method Jesus uses in his mission in Mark. The demon recognizes Jesus as "the Holy one of God", the first time Jesus' supernatural opponents are shown to know his true identity. Jesus simply says "Be quiet, and come out of him!", healing the man with words alone. The people are amazed. This follows a path Mark often uses, that of a description of the affliction, Jesus' cure of the affliction, and then a demonstration of the cure to others. The power of Jesus' word over the demon might be Mark's way of trying to show to his audience, perhaps under the threat of persecution, that Jesus' message will overcome evil. By showing Jesus' teaching first before his exorcism Mark might be placing emphasis on Jesus' teachings as more important that any miracle he could perform.

There were several people who were claimed to have the ability to perform exorcisms in the ancient world and many ancient opponents of Christianity dismissed Jesus as just another magician. Most descriptions of exorcisms at the time tended to involve the exorcist tricking the spirit or demon into leaving the victim by convincing them the exorcist had more power than the being, not a method Jesus employs. Parallels in Hellenistic cultural stories of exorcisms differ in that they usually involve an associated disease, which is not the case here. John P. Meier sees a clear distinction between these incidents and descriptions of magicians at the time.

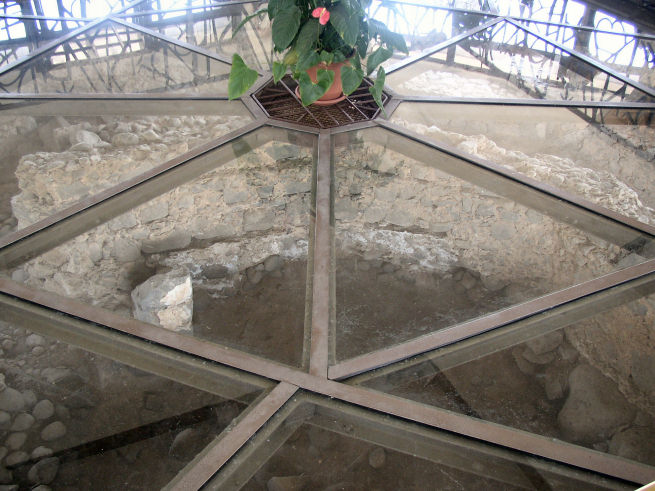
Alleged ruins of house of St. Peter under the Catholic Church in Capernaum, historical Judea

They go to Peter and Andrew's house and Jesus cures Peter's sick mother-in-law. The house was presumably near the synagogue. She then gets up and helps Jesus and his companions. Attending to her guests would have been her social duty in the Jewish culture. Mark uses the term ēgeiren, "to lift up", to describe Jesus' cure of her, followed by diēkonei, "she served", which some have seen as a theological message about Jesus' power requiring service. Karris argues for this event's historicity, perhaps based on an eyewitness. A story about Peter's mother-in-law might have survived due to the popularity of Peter among early Christians.

Peter is clearly listed here as having a wife, as Jesus healed his mother-in-law. Paul says that other Apostles, Cephas (Peter), and Jesus' brothers have wives, but not him, in 1 Corinthians 9:5. See also Clerical celibacy.

It is now night. Mark says "That evening after sunset …", one of his examples of redundancy as evening and after sunset are really the same thing repeated. Neither Luke and Matthew retain this redundancy. By this time word has spread and the people have brought the sick and possessed for Jesus to heal, which he does. Mark says the "whole city" came to see Jesus, which is probably an exaggeration. Both Luke and Matthew just state there were many people. The demons leaving the possessed people are not allowed to tell people who Jesus is, a common theme of Mark called the Messianic Secret. Jesus is able to cure every affliction of the people who come to see him.

He then leaves town very early in the morning for solitary prayer. Mark says πρωι εννυχον λιαν (prōi ennycha lian, "very early, it being yet night", a complicated description of time employing three adverbs). His disciples find him and tell him that everyone is looking for him. He says "Let us go somewhere else", to the nearby villages and he will preach to them there also. He says "That is why I have come", using the word εξηλθον (exēlthon), with its ex- prefix focusing on the place from which he has come, which some see as meaning a statement about Jesus' divine mandate or possibly a rejection of Capernaum: there is no general agreement on these points. He then travels over all of Galilee, preaching and healing.

He cures a leper who comes to him asking for a cure and tells him to show the priests and offer the cleaning sacrifices Moses had commanded (Leviticus 13–14), but not to tell people that Jesus had done it. Jesus here seems to stress the importance of the Mosaic law, see also Expounding of the Law. This episode is also recorded in the Egerton Gospel 2:1–4. People have seen Jesus telling the man to be quiet about what had happened as related to the Messianic Secret, although it could be Jesus just telling the man to immediately go to the priests. Leprosy could mean many skin diseases, such as favus or psoriasis. Mark says Jesus had "compassion" for the man, although a few manuscripts (the Codex Bezae and three others in old Latin) say he was angry, and some have argued that angry was the original word intentionally changed to make Jesus look less angry, as he is described as giving a "stern", embrimēsamenos, warning to the man in verse 43. Mark however also shows Jesus' anger in many other places, such as Mark 3:5 and the incident at the Temple, see also Expounding of the Law#Anger. Bruce Metzger's Textual Commentary on the Greek NT postulates a possible "confusion" between similar words in Aramaic (compare Syriac ethraham, "he had pity", with ethra'em, "he was enraged")". See also Aramaic primacy. Perhaps more likely, H. A. G. Houghton from the University of Birmingham speculated in "The Latin New Testament: A Guide to its Early History, Texts, and Manuscripts" that the mistake stemmed from a copyist misreading of the Latin word "miseratus", which means "pity", as "iratus", which means "anger". The man then seems to disobey and spreads the news, increasing Jesus' popularity even more. Whether or not he ever made it to the priests Mark does not say. This is the first of many times in Mark that Jesus unsuccessfully tries to conceal his workings by telling people to keep what he has done a secret. Karris argues that one could also read it as Jesus "spreading the news", not the man.

== Verse 45 ==
The chapter ends with Jesus returning to the "deserted" or "lonely" places, (Ancient Greek: επ ερημοις τοποις, ep eremois topois), which have been mentioned throughout the chapter (Mark 1:3–4, 12–13, 35, 45), but the people follow him there too.

Matthew records these events in Matthew 3–4 without an explicit mention of the exorcism and the curing of Peter's mother-in-law. The curing of the leper then appears in Matthew 8:1–4 after the Sermon on the Mount, along with the healing of Peter's mother-in-law in Matthew 8:14–17.

Luke largely has the same order as Mark in Luke 3–5:16 except that Jesus calls his disciples after meeting Peter and curing his mother-in-law. Luke also has Jesus going to Nazareth after his temptation and arguing with the people there. Matthew says he left Nazareth and went to Galilee, but does not relate what happened there.

John records Jesus' baptism and calling of disciples in John 1. John also has Jesus' disciples baptising at the same time as John the Baptist and so has more occur before John's arrest than in the synoptic accounts.

== See also ==
- John the Baptist

== Sources ==
- Bauckham, Richard (2017). Jesus and the Eyewitnesses (2nd ed.). Wm. B. Eerdmans Publishing. ISBN 9780802874313.
- Bauer, Walter et al. A Greek-English Lexicon of the New Testament and Other Early Christian Literature University Of Chicago Press; 3rd edition (January 15, 2001). ISBN 0-226-03933-1.
- Brown, Raymond E. (1997). An Introduction to the New Testament. Doubleday. ISBN 0-385-24767-2.
- Brown, Raymond E.; Fitzmyer, Joseph A.; Murphy, Roland Edmund (1990). The New Jerome Biblical Commentary. Prentice Hall. ISBN 0-13-614934-0.
- Kilgallen, John J. (1989). A Brief Commentary on the Gospel of Mark. Paulist Press. ISBN 0-8091-3059-9.
- Metzger, Bruce M. (June 1994). Textual Commentary on the Greek New Testament (2nd ed.). Deutsche Bibelgesellschaft. ISBN 3-438-06010-8.
- Miller, Robert J., ed. (1994). The Complete Gospels. Polebridge Press. ISBN 0-06-065587-9.
- Nestle, Eberhard; Nestle, Erwin; Åland, Kurt; Novum Testamentum Graece American Bible Society; 27th edition (June 1993). ISBN 3-438-05100-1.

Preceded by Matthew 28	Chapters of the Bible; Gospel of Mark	Succeeded by Mark 2
