= Matthew 8:6 =

- ← 8:5 8:7 →
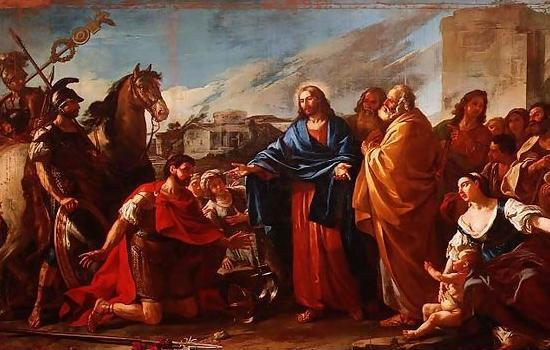
- Joseph-Marie Vien's 1752 depiction of Jesus and the Centurion
- Book: Gospel of Matthew
- Christian Bible part: New Testament

Matthew 8:6 is the sixth verse of the eighth chapter of the Gospel of Matthew in the New Testament. This verse continues the miracle story in which a centurion's servant is healed, the second of a series of miracles in Matthew.

== Content ==
In the original Greek according to Westcott-Hort this verse is:

και λεγων κυριε ο παις μου βεβληται εν
τη οικια παραλυτικος δεινως βασανιζομενος

In the King James Version of the Bible, the text reads:

And saying, Lord, my servant lieth at home
sick of the palsy, grievously tormented.

The English Standard Version translates the passage as:

“Lord, my servant is lying paralyzed
at home, suffering terribly.”

== Analysis ==
A similar story to this occurs in Luke 7. An important difference between the accounts is that Matthew uses παις as opposed to Luke's mix of both παις and δουλος. δουλος can mean either servant or slave, while παις can mean either servant or son. It is the same word used for children in Matthew 2:16. Thus while both writers could be referring to the Centurion's servant, Matthew may believe the sufferer is his son. Another change is the ailment. Luke has the servant near death from an unspecified malady. In Mark's Gospel the cleansing of the leper is immediately followed by the healing the paralytic at Capernaum, and the author of Matthew may attach the illness from the later to this narrative.

A servant would have been a slave, but slaves were a legal part of a Roman family. As Roman Centurions were barred from marrying, the slave may likely have been the Centurion's only family. There would also have been a financial consideration as a slave would be a large part of the wealth of a minor officer.

== Commentary from the Church Fathers ==
Pseudo-Chrysostom: This centurion was the first-fruits of the Gentiles, and in comparison of his faith, all the faith of the Jews was unbelief; he neither heard Christ teaching, nor saw the leper when he was cleansed, but from hearing only that he had been healed, he believed more than he heard; and so he mystically typified the Gentiles that should come, who had neither read the Law nor the Prophets concerning Christ, nor had seen Christ Himself work His miracles. He came to Him and besought Him, saying, Lord, my servant lieth at home sick of the palsy, and is grievously afflicted. Mark the goodness of the centurion, who for the health of his servant was in so great haste and anxiety, as though by his death he should suffer loss, not of money, but of his well-being. For he reckoned no difference between the servant and the master; their place in this world may be different, but their nature is one. Mark also his faith, in that he said not, Come and heal him, because that Christ who stood there was present in every place; and his wisdom, in that he said not, Heal him here on this spot, for he knew that He was mighty to do, wise to understand, and merciful to hearken, therefore he did but declare the sickness, leaving it to the Lord, by His merciful power to heal. And he is grievously afflicted; this shows how he loved him, for when any that we love is pained or tormented, though it be but slightly, yet we think him more afflicted than he really is.

Rabanus Maurus: All these things he recounts with grief, that he is sick, that it is with palsy; that he is grievously afflicted therewith, the more to show the sorrow of his own heart, and to move the Lord to have mercy. In like manner ought all to feel for their servants, and to take thought for them.

Chrysostom: But some say that he says these things in excuse of himself, as reasons why he did not bring the sick man himself. For it was impossible to bring one in a palsy, in great torment, and at the point to die. But I rather think it a mark of his great faith; inasmuch as he knew that a word alone was enough to restore the sick man, he deemed it superfluous to bring him.

Hilary of Poitiers: Spiritually interpreted, the Gentiles are the sick in this world, and afflicted with the diseases of sin, all their limbs being altogether unnerved, and unfit for their duties of standing and walking. The sacrament of their salvation is fulfilled in this centurion's servant, of whom it is sufficiently declared that he was the head of the Gentiles that should believe. What sort of head this is, the song of Moses in Deuteronomy teaches, He set the bounds of the people according to the number of the Angels. (Deut. 32:8.)

Saint Remigius: Or, in the centurion are figured those of the Gentiles who first believed, and were perfect in virtue. For a centurion is one who commands a hundred soldiers; and a hundred is a perfect number. Rightly, therefore, the centurion prays for his servant, because the first-fruits of the Gentiles prayed to God for the salvation of the whole Gentile world.

| Preceded by Matthew 8:5 | Gospel of Matthew; Chapter 8 | Succeeded by Matthew 8:7 |
