= Matthew 8:7 =

- ← 8:6 8:8 →
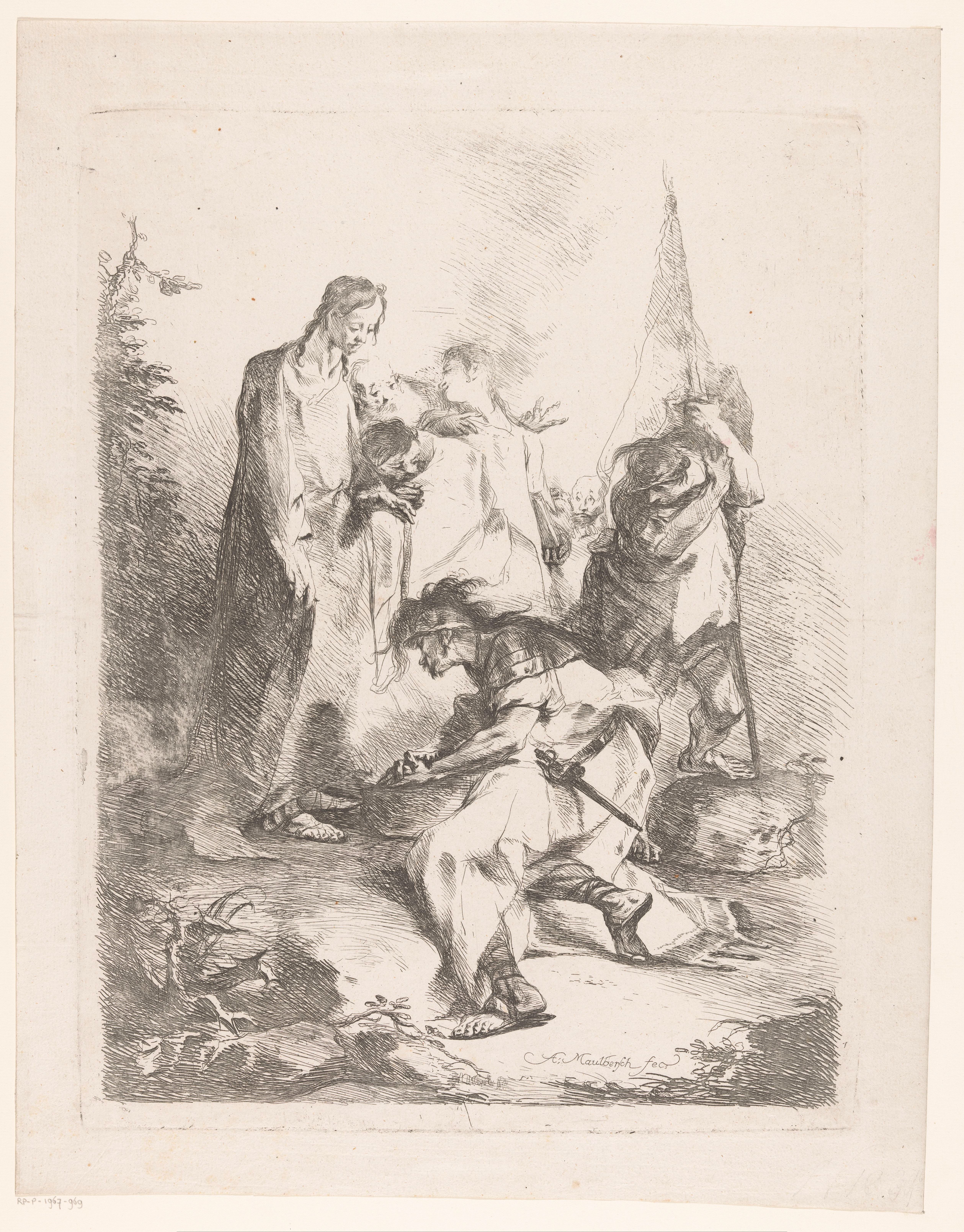
- "Christ and the Centurion of Capernaum". Franz Anton Maulbertsch (1734-1796).
- Book: Gospel of Matthew
- Christian Bible part: New Testament

Matthew 8:7 is the seventh verse of the eighth chapter of the Gospel of Matthew in the New Testament. This verse continues the miracle story of healing the centurion's servant, the second of a series of miracles in Matthew.

== Content ==
In the original Greek according to Westcott-Hort this verse is:

λεγει αυτω εγω ελθων θεραπευσω αυτον

In the King James Version of the Bible the text reads:

And Jesus saith unto him, I will come and heal him.

The English Standard Version translates the passage as:

And he said to him, “I will come and heal him.”

The New International Version translates the passage as:

Jesus said to him, “Shall I come and heal him?”

For a collection of other versions see BibleHub Matthew 8:7.

== Analysis ==
In the previous verse, a Centurion had asked Jesus to come and heal his paralyzed servant. Modern translations offer two different versions of this verse. Some, like the ESV, translate it as a declaration that Jesus will go and heal the servant. Others, like the NIV, have Jesus questioning whether he should come and help.

The original Greek is ambiguous, and both versions can be reconciled with the narrative. Jesus' initial questioning response parallels his interaction with the Canaanite woman in Matthew 15. Initially, Gentiles are met with rejection, and most demonstrate their piety before Jesus acknowledges them. Jesus' initial reluctance may also be related to prohibitions against entering a Gentile's home. However, Gundry argues that if entering the home was the issue, the focus would be on that, rather than on the healing.

== Commentary from the Church Fathers ==
Jerome: The Lord seeing the centurion's faith, humbleness, and thoughtfulness, straightway promises to go and heal him; Jesus saith unto him, I will come and heal him.

Chrysostom: Jesus here does what He never did; He always follows the wish of the supplicant, but here He goes before it, and not only promises to heal him, but to go to his house. This He does, that we may learn the worthiness of the centurion.

Pseudo-Chrysostom: Had not He said, I will come and heal him, the other would never have answered, I am not worthy. It was because it was a servant for whom he made petition, that Christ promised to go, in order to teach us not to have respect to the great, and overlook the little, but to honour poor and rich alike.

Preceded by Matthew 8:6	Gospel of Matthew; Chapter 8	Succeeded by Matthew 8:8
