= Matthew 8:5 =

- ← 8:4 8:6 →
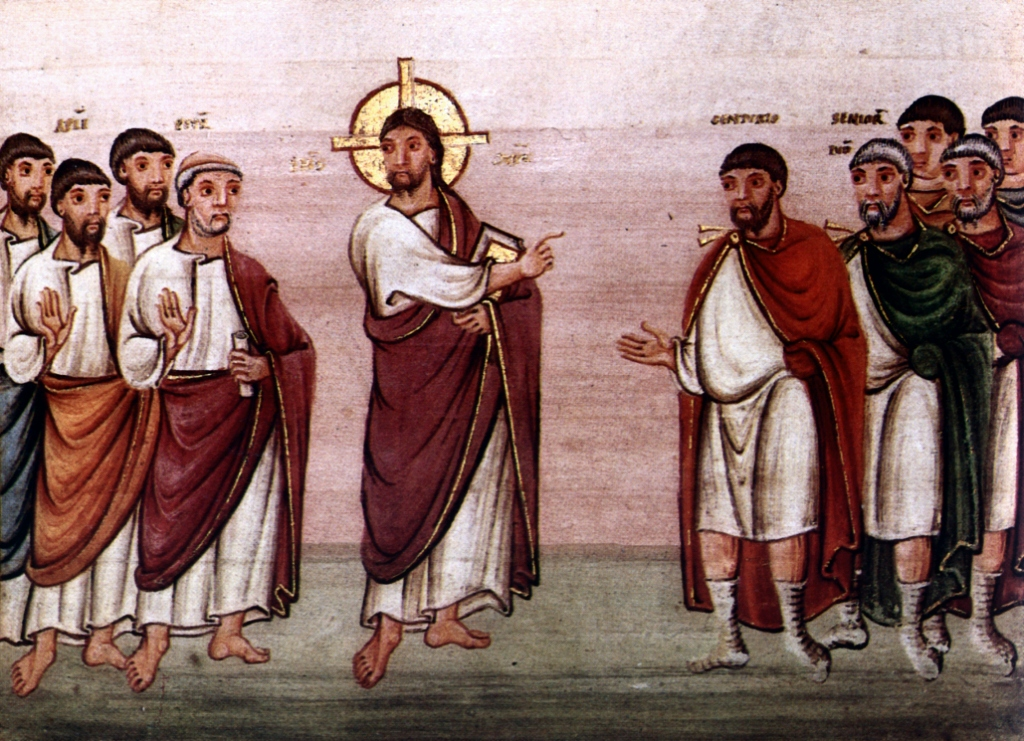
- Jesus and the centurion in Capernaum (Matthew 8:5), miniature, Codex Egberti,
- Book: Gospel of Matthew
- Christian Bible part: New Testament

Matthew 8:5 is the fifth verse of the eighth chapter of the Gospel of Matthew in the New Testament. This verse begins the miracle story in which a centurion's servant is healed, the second of a series of miracles reported in Matthew.

== Content ==
In the original Greek according to Westcott-Hort this verse is:

εισελθοντος δε αυτου εις καφαρναουμ
προσηλθεν αυτω εκατονταρχος παρακαλων αυτον

In the King James Version of the Bible, the text reads:

And when Jesus was entered into Capernaum,
there came unto him a centurion, beseeching him,

The English Standard Version translates the passage as:

When he had entered Capernaum, a centurion
came forward to him, appealing to him.

This verse has a parallel in Luke 7:1.

== Analysis ==
Jesus returns to Capernaum in Galilee, which Matthew 4:13 had noted as Jesus' home. Centurion was a rank in the Roman Army, low level officer in command of 100 infantry. At the time the area was ruled by Herod Antipas, not directly under Roman rule, so one question is why a Roman Centurian would be present. New Testament scholar Robert Gundry presents three possibilities: as a border town there may still well have been a Roman garrison; the Centurion may have travelled from a directly administered region like Roman Syria; or Herod's forces may have used ranks similar to the Roman army and the Centurion may be from those local forces. Carr, in the Cambridge Bible for Schools and Colleges, also suggests that "[the] centurion was probably an officer in the army of Herod Antipas, which would be modelled after the Roman fashion". Craig Keener adds the possibility that he could have been a retired Centurion who had been granted land in the area.

As a member of the Roman military, the centurion would have been mandated to perform cult rites including emperor worship. The centurions would have been the Roman officers local people would most often have had dealings with.

This centurion is one of several appearing in the New Testament, with most of them being presented positively. In Luke's account the centurion is described as being influential with the local Jewish elders.

== Commentary from the Church Fathers ==
Pseudo-Chrysostom: The Lord having taught His disciples on the mount, and healed the leper at the foot of the mount, came to Capharnaum. This is a mystery, signifying that after the purification of the Jews He went to the Gentiles.

Haymo of Halberstadt: For Capharnaum, which is interpreted, The town of fatness, or, The field of consolation, signifies the Church, which was gathered out of the Gentiles, which is replenished with spiritual fatness, according to that, That my soul may be filled with marrow and fatness, (Ps. 63:5.) and under the troubles of the world is comforted concerning heavenly things, according to that, Thy consolations hare rejoiced my soul. (Ps. 94:19.) Hence it is said, When he had entered into Capharnaum the centurion came to him.

Augustine: This centurion was of the Gentiles, for Judæa had already soldiers of the Roman empire.

Preceded by Matthew 8:4	Gospel of Matthew; Chapter 8	Succeeded by Matthew 8:6
