= Matthew 7:29 =

- ← 7:28 8:1 →
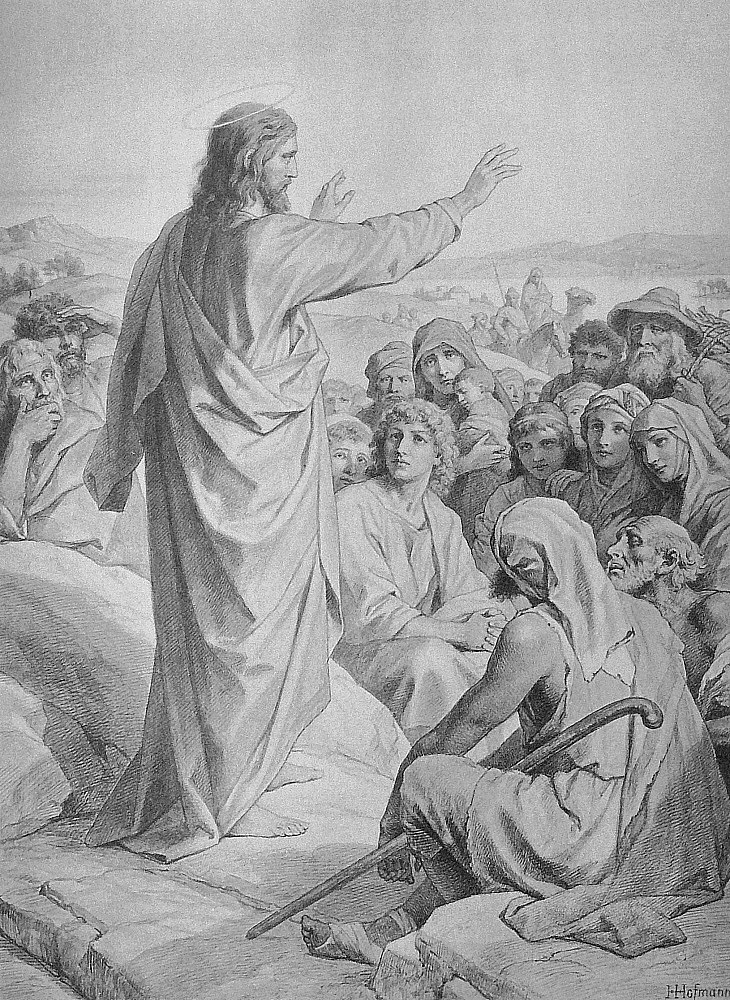
- "Christ preaching to the Multitude" by Heinrich Hofmann.
- Book: Gospel of Matthew
- Christian Bible part: New Testament

Matthew 7:29 is the twenty-ninth (and the last) verse in the seventh chapter of the Gospel of Matthew in the New Testament. It ends a two verse conclusion following the Sermon on the Mount.

== Content ==
In the Westcott-Hort edition of the original Greek, this verse reads:

ην γαρ διδασκων αυτους ως εξουσιαν
εχων και ουχ ως οι γραμματεις αυτων

In the King James Version of the Bible, the text reads:

For he taught them as one having
authority, and not as the scribes.

The English Standard Version translates the passage as:

for he was teaching them as one who
had authority, and not as their scribes.

For a collection of other versions see BibleHub Matthew 7:29.

== Analysis ==
In the previous verse, the crowd of onlookers were described as astonished at Jesus' sayings (Greek: τους λογους τουτους, tous logous toutous) which complete Matthew's narrative known as the "Sermon on the Mount", and this verse explains why. The final phrase is a verbatim copy of Mark 1:22, set in a very different context. Mark's Gospel simply asserts Jesus' authority; Matthew uses it as a concluding argument after presenting the Sermon on the Mount as evidence.

In some translations this verse refers to their scribes. Ulrich Luz suggests that this is a clear indicator that Jesus' followers saw themselves as separate from the mainstream Jewish community at the time this gospel was written. Scribes refers to the trained rabbis who would quote scribal authorities, and makes clear that Jesus is greater than the most important rabbi. A sermon by the rabbis would have been replete with references to scripture to validate each teaching. The contrast presented by Matthew is that Jesus speaks based on his own authority, not that of past figures.

A few authorities add "... and the Pharisees" (e.g. Wycliffe's Bible, the Vulgate Latin, the Syriac, the Persic versions, and the Hebrew edition of Matthew by Munster). The Pulpit Commentary suggests that this "may either be derived from Luke 5:30 or be an independent gloss due to the fact that the Pharisees were looked upon as the typical Jewish teachers".

== Commentary from the Church Fathers ==
Jerome: For as the God and Lord of Moses himself, He of His own free will either added such things as seemed omitted in the Law, or even changed some; as above we read, It was said by them of old.… But I say unto you. But the Scribes only taught the people what was written in Moses and the Prophets.

Gregory the Great: Or, Christ spoke with especial power, because He did no evil from weakness, but we who are weak, in our weakness consider by what method in teaching we may best consult for our weak brethren.

Hilary of Poitiers: Or; They measure the efficacy of His power, by the might of His words.

Preceded by Matthew 7:28	Gospel of Matthew; Chapter 7	Succeeded by Matthew 8:1
