= Matthew 7:28 =

- ← 7:27 7:29 →
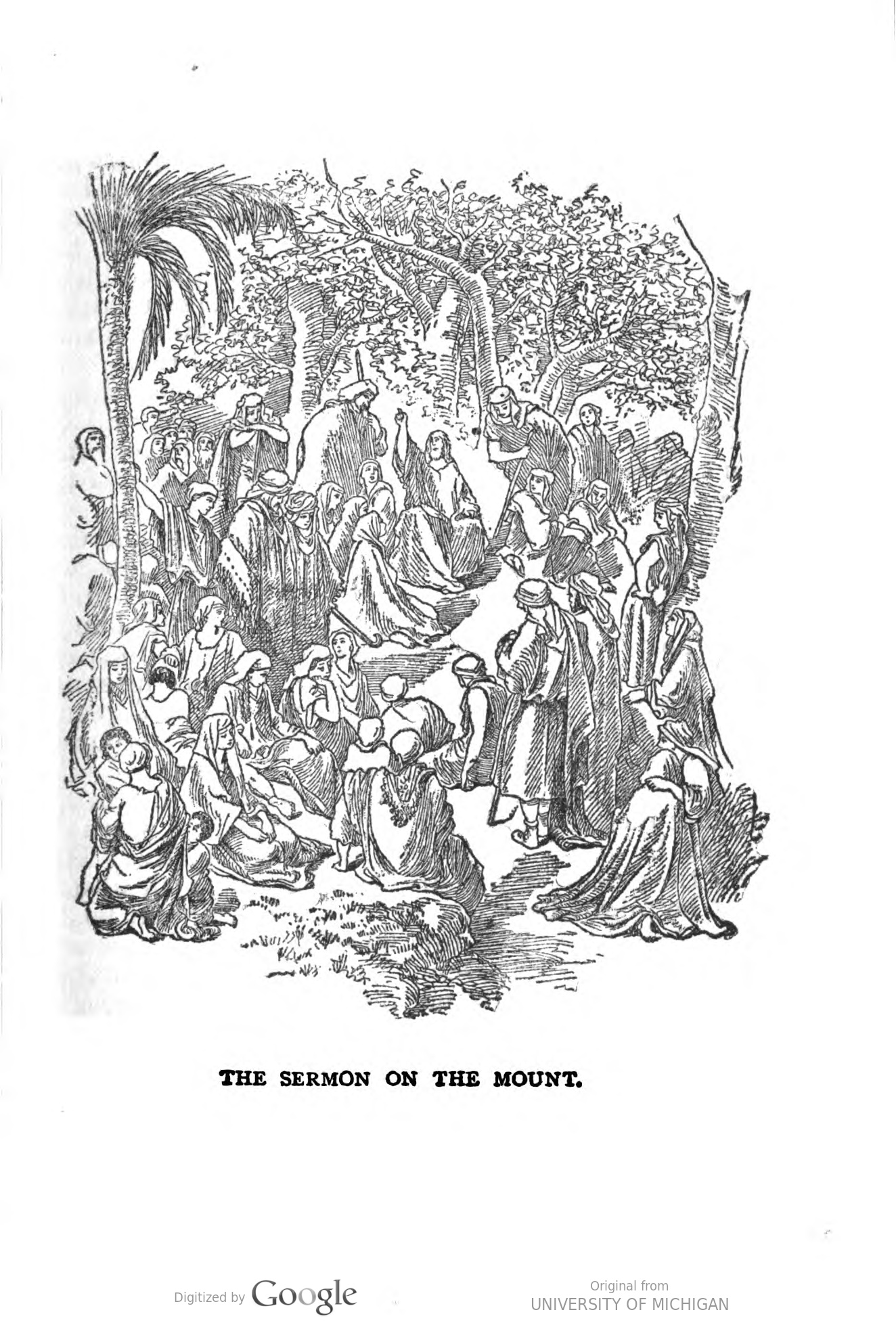
- "The sermon on the mount". From: The story of the Bible for young people (1910).
- Book: Gospel of Matthew
- Christian Bible part: New Testament

Matthew 7:28 is the twenty-eighth verse of the seventh chapter of the Gospel of Matthew in the New Testament. It forms the first part of a two verse conclusion following the Sermon on the Mount.

== Content ==
In the original Greek according to Westcott-Hort this verse is:

και εγενετο οτε ετελεσεν ο ιησους τους λογους
τουτους εξεπλησσοντο οι οχλοι επι τη διδαχη αυτου

In the King James Version of the Bible the text reads:

And it came to pass, when Jesus had ended these
sayings, the people were astonished at his doctrine:

The World English Bible translates the passage as:

When Jesus had finished saying these things,
the multitudes were astonished at his teaching,

For a collection of other versions see BibleHub Matthew 7:28.

== Analysis ==
This verse parallels portions of Luke 4:32 and Luke 7:1, with one of the Gospel writers greatly modifying the source material. It also links back the Matthew 5:1, the first verse of the Sermon on the Mount.

"Finished saying theses things" is a standard phrase used by Matthew to end a discourse by Jesus, also being found at Matthew 11:1, 13:53, 19:1, and 26:1. It makes clear that the Gospel is concluding a section. The term may be based on Old Testament sources. Another common Matthean feature is his mention of the crowds or multitudes. Matthew adds crowds of followers in several verses that are lacking them in Luke. The word translated as astonished can mean both amazed with wonder and overwhelmed with fear, though this verse could very well intend both meanings.

== Commentary from the Church Fathers ==
Glossa Ordinaria: Having related Christ's teaching, he shows its effects on the multitude, saying, And it came to pass, when Jesus had ended these words, the multitude wondered at his doctrine.

Rabanus Maurus: This ending pertains both to the finishing the words, and the completeness of the doctrines. That it is said that the multitude wondered, either signifies the unbelieving in the crowd, who were astonished because they did not believe the Saviour's words; or is said of them all, in that they reverenced in Him the excellence of so great wisdom.

Pseudo-Chrysostom: The mind of man when satisfied reasonably brings forth praise, but when overcome, wonder. For whatever we are not able to praise worthily, we admire. Yet their admiration pertained rather to Christ's glory than to their faith, for had they believed on Christ, they would not have wondered. For wonder is raised by whatever surpasses the appearance of the speaker or actor; and thence we do not wonder at what is done or said by God, because all things are less than God's power. But it was the multitude that wondered, that is the common people, not the chief among the people, who are not wont to hear with the desire of learning; but the simple folk heard in simplicity; had others been present they would have broken up their silence by contradicting, for where the greater knowledge is, there is the stronger malice. For he that is in haste to be first, is not content to be second.

Augustine: From that which is here said, He seems to have left the crowd of disciples—those out of whom He chose twelve, whom He called Apostles—but Matthew omits to mention it. For to His disciples only, Jesus seems to have held this Sermon, which Matthew recounts, Luke omits. That after descending into a plain He held another like discourse, which Luke records, and Matthew omits. Still it may be supposed, that, as was said above, He delivered one and the same Sermon to the Apostles, and the rest of the multitude present, which has been recorded by Matthew and Luke, in different words, but with the same truth of substance; and this explains what is here said of the multitude wondering.

Chrysostom: He adds the cause of their wonderment, saying, He taught them as one having authority, and not as the Scribes and Pharisees. But if the Scribes drove Him from them, seeing His power shown in works, how would they not have been offended when words only manifested His power? But this was not so with the multitude; for being of benevolent temper, it is easily persuaded by the word of truth. Such however was the power wherewith He taught them, that it drew many of them to Him, and caused them to wonder; and for their delight in those things which were spoken they did not leave Him even when He had done speaking; but followed Him as He came down from the mount. They were mostly astonished at His power, in that He spoke not referring to any other as the Prophets and Moses had spoken, but every where showing that He Himself had authority; for in delivering each law, He prefaced it with, But I say unto you.

Preceded by Matthew 7:27	Gospel of Matthew; Chapter 7	Succeeded by Matthew 7:29
