= Matthew 8:1 =

- ← 7:29 8:2 →
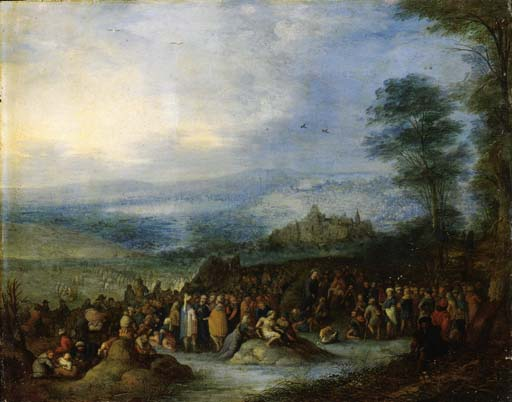
- "Christ preaching to the Multitude" by Joseph van Bredael (1688–1739).
- Book: Gospel of Matthew
- Christian Bible part: New Testament

Matthew 8:1 is the first verse of the eighth chapter of the Gospel of Matthew in the New Testament. The Sermon on the Mount has been concluded in the previous chapter and this verse opens a section focusing on Jesus' miracles, which continue into Matthew 9.

== Content ==
In the original Greek according to Westcott-Hort, this verse is:

καταβάντος δὲ αὐτοῦ ἀπὸ τοῦ ὄρους ἠκολούθησαν αὐτῷ ὄχλοι πολλοί

In the King James Version of the Bible, the text reads:

When he was come down from the mountain, great multitudes followed him.

The English Standard Version translates the passage as:

When he came down from the mountain, great crowds followed him.

Richard Weymouth presents a slightly different interpretation:

Upon descending from the hill country, He was followed by immense crowds.

== Analysis ==
The first part of this verse has no parallel in either Luke or Mark, but does have clear links with the repeated scriptural mentions of Moses descending from Mount Sinai.

The reference to great crowds following Jesus is a common motif in the Gospel of Matthew, but one which theologian Robert Gundry thinks is unlikely to be historically accurate. The term followed him, as in English, has a double meaning of literally travelling after him and also metaphorically becoming followers of his teachings.

Preceded by Matthew 7:29	Gospel of Matthew; Chapter 8	Succeeded by Matthew 8:2
