= Jesus cleansing a leper =

Miracle carried out by Jesus according to the Bible

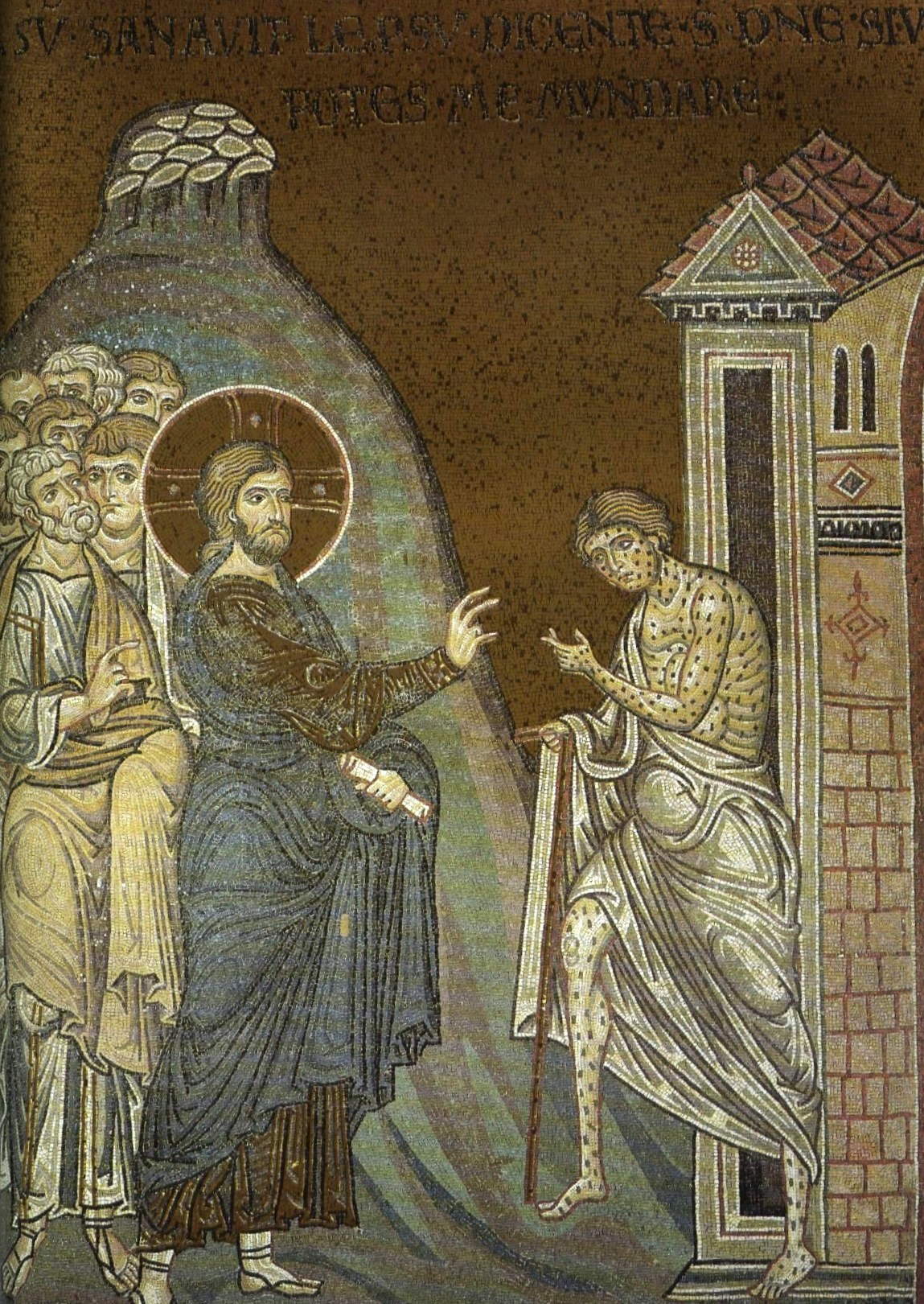
Christ and leper man, a Monreale Cathedral mosaic

Jesus cleansing a leper is one of the miracles of Jesus. The story is found in all three of the Synoptic Gospels: Matthew 8:1–4, Mark 1:40–45 and Luke 5:12–16.

== Biblical narrative ==
According to the Gospel of Matthew, when Jesus Christ came down from the mountain after the Sermon on the Mount, large multitudes followed him. A man full of leprosy came and knelt before him and inquired him saying, "Lord, if you are willing, you can make me clean." Mark and Luke do not connect the verse to the Sermon.

Jesus Christ reached out his hand and touched the man. "I am willing," he said. "Be clean!" Instantly he was healed of his leprosy. Then Jesus said to him, "See that you don't tell anyone. But go, show yourself to the priest and offer the gift Moses commanded, as a testimony to them."

In Mark and Luke the healed man instead went out and began to talk freely, spreading the news. As a result, Jesus could no longer enter a town openly but stayed outside in lonely places. Yet the people still came to him from everywhere.

== Leviticus 13 ==
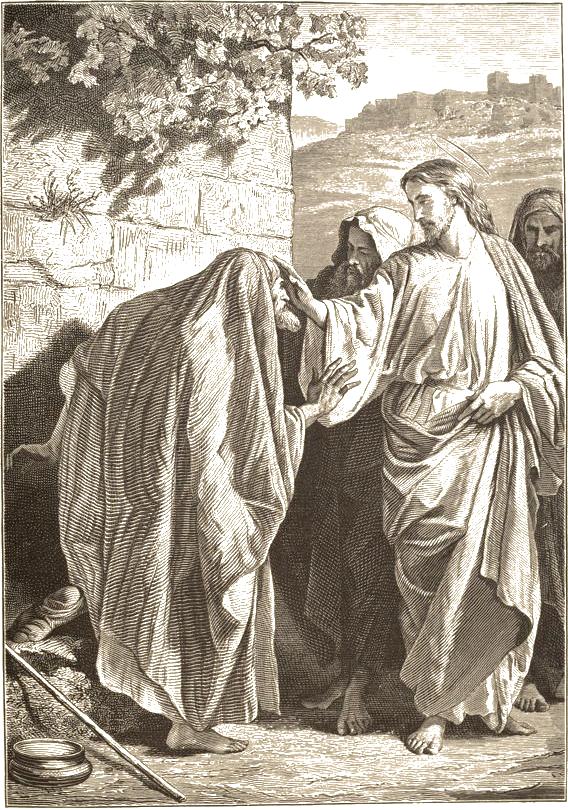
Jesus heals the leper by Alexandre Bida

There is some speculation as to whether the illness now called Hansen's disease is the same described in Biblical times as leprosy. As the disease progresses, pain turns to numbness, and the skin loses its original color and becomes thick, glossy and scaly. Sores and ulcers develop, especially around the eyes and ears, and the skin begins to bunch up with deep furrows between the swelling so that the face of the afflicted individual looks similar to that of a lion. Since the disease attacks the larynx also, the voice becomes hoarse and acquires a grating quality.

Leviticus 13 outlines specific procedures for dealing with a person suspected of being infected with leprosy. A priest would have to inspect the lesion, and after a period of monitoring and observation, if the condition did not improve, the person would be declared ritually "unclean".

Leprosy was considered a sort of curse from God, of profound impurity. To be declared unclean because of leprosy meant that the unfortunate person had to tear his clothes and put a covering upon his upper lip and cry, "unclean, unclean." As the Jews were concerned that the condition was contagious, such individuals were to live separated outside the camp. Ostracized from the community, they were left homeless without the support structure of family and friends. In approaching Jesus, the man was in violation of Levitical law. In touching the leper, Jesus also defies Levitical law.

When the Son sent forth the disciples with instructions to heal the sick, cleansing the lepers was specifically mentioned in Matthew 10:8.

== Commentary ==
British Baptist preacher Charles Haddon Spurgeon preached a sermon likening the condition of a person afflicted with leprosy to that of someone in a state of sin. Leprosy symbolizes the defilement of sin which results in separation from God and the community.

Cornelius a Lapide notes that Jesus touched him so "that He might show that He was above the law, which forbade contact with the leper", since in Jesus' case there was no danger of such contamination, but rather "the certainty of healing the leper". So although Christ broke the letter of the law, he fulfilled the spirit of the law in general.

== See also ==
- Cleansing ten lepers
- Ministry of Jesus
- Miracles of Jesus
- Parables of Jesus
- Tzaraath
