= De recta in Deum fide =

De recta in Deum fide ('On the Orthodox Faith in God'), also known as the Dialogue of Adamantius, is an anonymous Christian dialogue in Greek from the late 3rd or early 4th century. It was probably written in Asia Minor or Syria. It is a defence of Christian orthodoxy against the heresies of Marcionism and Gnosticism.

The orthodox protagonist in the dialogue is named Adamantius, and this has been taken as the name of the author. In chapter 24 of the Philocalia, a collection of the works of Origen, the latter is identified with Adamantius. Although the Philocalia was originally compiled in the 4th century by Basil the Great and Gregory Nazianzus, the authenticity of chapter 24 is suspect and the identification of Origen as the author of De recta is not accepted today, although the author is commonly called Pseudo-Origen. Internal evidence suggests that the work was composed in two stages, or possibly that there was a first and a second edition.

De recta in Deum fide is divided into five books covering a series of three disputations. In the first debate, Adamantius faces off against two disciples of Marcion, Megethius and Marcus. In the second, he debates a disciple of Bardaisan named Marinus. In the third, he debates two Valentinians, Droserius and Valens. The debates are judged by a pagan named Eutropius, who declares Adamantius the winner at the end of the second book and again at the end of the fifth. In the end, Eutropius wishes to convert to Christianity.

De recta was translated into Latin by Rufinus of Aquileia in the 4th century. Although it has been little studied, it is an important witness to the diversity of opinion among heretics and to the texts of the Marcionites.
