= Messianic Secret =

Motif in the Gospel of Mark

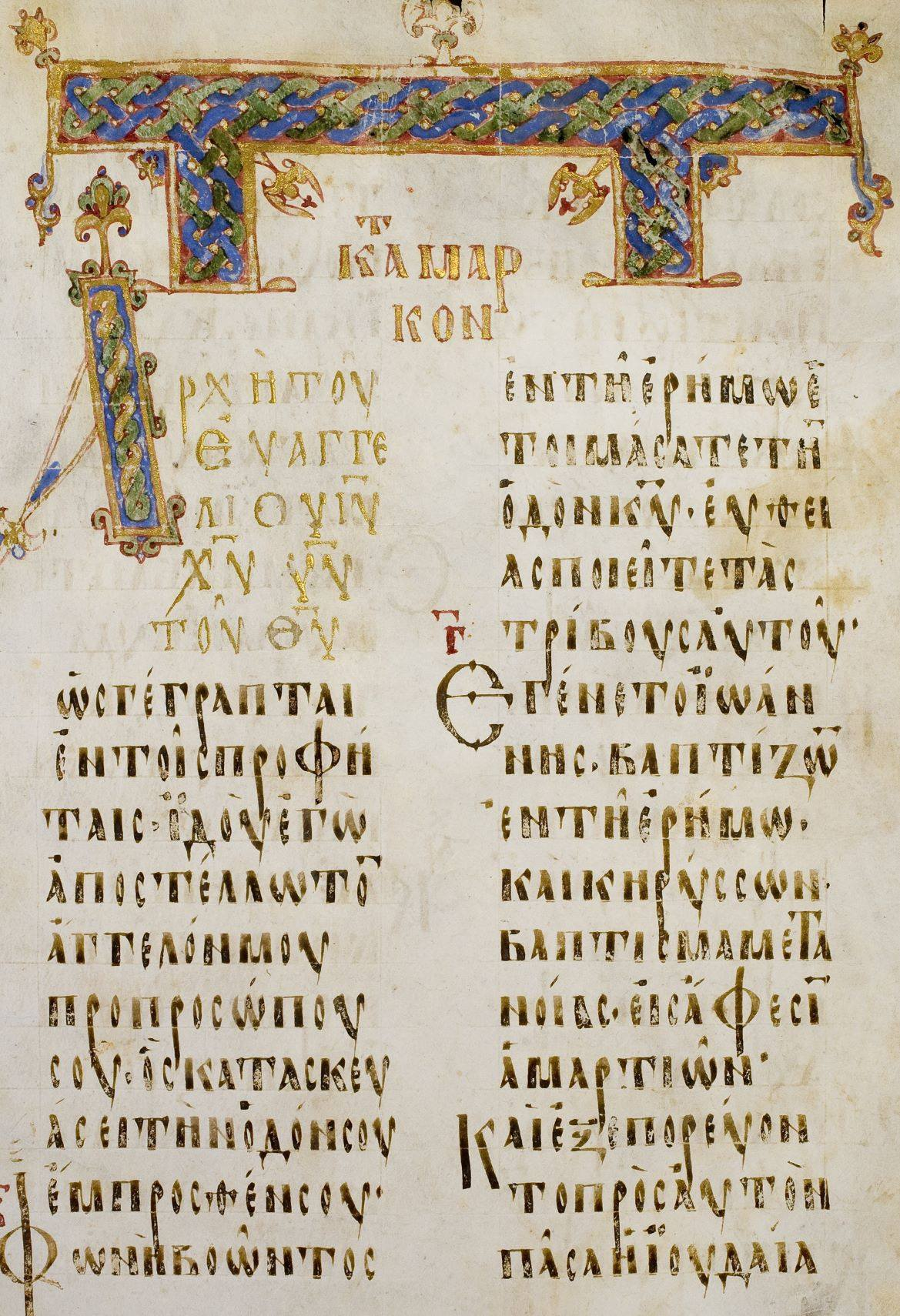
A 9th-century Gospel of Mark, from the Codex Boreelianus

The Messianic Secret is a motif in the Gospel of Mark, in which Jesus is portrayed as commanding his followers to maintain silence about his Messianic mission. Attention was first drawn to this motif in 1901 by William Wrede.

Part of Wrede's theory involved statements in the New Testament by Jesus to demons who recognize his divine nature as well as to his followers not to reveal to others that he is the Messiah. Wrede suggested that this theme was not historical but was an addition by the author of Mark. Wrede's broad concept of the Messianic Secret also involved the use of parables by Jesus.

Wrede's theory had an inherent inter-relationship with the hypothesis of Markan priority, which Wrede eventually abandoned, but some of his followers accepted. The theory of the Messianic secret was strongly criticized in the first years of the 20th century, then gained acceptance in the 1920s. It eventually began to lose support and by the 1970s it no longer existed as Wrede had proposed it. Since Wrede, attempts to decipher Mark's characterization of the disciples and the "Messianic Secret" have been centerstage. (Note: The latest scholarship: Bibliowicz Abel M., Jewish-Christian Relations - The First Centuries (Mascarat, 2019); Neufeld, Dietmar Mockery and Secretism in the Social World of Mark's Gospel (2014), Iverson, Kelly R. Wherever the Gospel Is Preached': The Paradox of Secrecy in the Gospel of Mark in Kelly R. Iverson and Christopher W. Skinner eds. Mark as Story: Retrospect and Prospect (2011) 181–209; Watson, David F. Honor among Christians: The Cultural Key to the Messianic Secret (2010))

== New Testament examples ==
In the New Testament, Jesus commands silence in many instances. There are three relevant biblical texts:Mark 8:29–30, Matthew 16:16, 20 and Luke 9:20–21

And he asked them, "But who do you say that I am?" Peter said to him in reply, "You are the Messiah." Then he warned them not to tell anyone about him.

Jesus also issues commands of silence after miracles and healings, e.g. in Mark 1:43–45 in the cleansing of a leper:

Then, warning him sternly, he dismissed him at once.

Then he said to him, "See that you tell no one anything, but go, show yourself to the priest and offer for your cleansing what Moses prescribed; that will be proof for them."

The man went away and began to publicize the whole matter. He spread the report abroad so that it was impossible for Jesus to enter a town openly. He remained outside in deserted places, and people kept coming to him from everywhere.

The part "See that you tell no one anything" is missing from the 2nd century Egerton Gospel.

The concept, as Wrede used it, also included parables and secrets of the Kingdom of God as in Mark 4:11:

He answered them, "The mystery (secret/hidden knowledge) of the kingdom of God has been granted to you. But to those outside everything comes in parables."

The word mystery is from the Greek μυστήριον mystērion meaning secret or hidden information as opposed to the modern English usage.

== Wrede's theory ==
Wrede proposed that the author of Mark invented the notion of secrecy to explain a question early Christians might have raised about Jesus: if Jesus was the Messiah, as they believed, then why did he not proclaim and make it part of his ministry? In Wrede's theory, the secrecy is a literary strategy meant to head off this objection while steering a middle course between two points of view in early Christianity about Jesus's role as messiah: that Jesus only became the messiah starting at the crucifixion (Phillipians 2:6-11), or that his role had been fully filled and preordained since the beginning of time (John 1:1).

Wrede's notion of secrecy did not simply rely on the commands of Jesus but also involved the "Markan parable theory" of why Jesus spoke in parables. The secrecy encompasses Jesus's teaching and miracles, and is frequently violated so as to give the gospel's audience a foreshadowing of the passion and resurrection.

Wrede recognized the inherent inter-relationship of his approach with the hypothesis of Markan priority – namely that Mark was written first and influenced the other Gospels. However, after re-examining his initial theory, Wrede suggested that his theory would work best if the Markan priority hypothesis turned out to be false and wrote: "it would be 'most highly desirable' if such a gospel as Mark were not the oldest gospel". Yet, the followers of the Messianic Secret hypothesis were later forced to assume Markan priority – an issue that has resulted in various forms of criticism by other scholars.

== Analysis and interpretation ==
=== Criticism ===
Soon after the appearance of the theory in 1901, theologians such as William Sanday and Albert Schweitzer reacted negatively to it. Initially, scholarship was strictly divided, although suggestions to bridge a gap between the opposing views were made. Wrede's broad concept of the Messianic Secret also involved the use of parables by Jesus, and in his criticism Schweitzer called it the weakest element of Wrede's approach.

Wrede's theory enjoyed its highest level of acceptance in the 1920s, and support for it began to decline thereafter as criticisms of the theory were provided based on multiple new arguments. In the 1960s, Ulrich Luz posited that the commands of silence which Jesus gave to healed persons belonged to a different category from those issued to his disciples. By the mid-1970s the Messianic Secret theory was no longer credited by scholars in the form that Wrede had proposed it.

Late in the 20th century, criticism of both the motif and the theory continued from a number of other perspectives, e.g. Daniel J. Harrington, a former professor at the Weston Jesuit School of Theology, argued that even the term "Messianic Secret" is a misnomer, has lumped together multiple issues and some of the Biblical terms used have been confused. G. E. Ladd, a former Baptist professor at Fuller Theological Seminary, stated that the Messianic Secret "is a clever theory, but utterly lacking in evidence".

=== Other explanations ===
Other explanations regarding the commands of secrecy issued by Jesus have been proposed, e.g. philological explanations based on mistranslations. An example is the explanation suggested by the Exegetic School of Madrid based on the Aramaic primacy that Jesus never expressed those ideas, and that they were added as a result of mistranslation of what Jesus said. However, there is no extant copy of this alleged Aramaic original to support this proposal.

The historical explanations generally assume that the Gospel of Mark is historical and that Jesus issued the commands. Based on that assumption, various additional theories have been proposed, e.g. that Jesus issued the commands in order not to become a "celebrity" and be able to move about with ease.

The theological explanation was proposed by Wrede: it was not yet the proper time for him to be revealed as such. He knew when he had to go to the court and then be crucified. In Mark 8:30 Jesus, "Then strictly warned them that they should tell no one about Him." Jesus' messianic mission cannot be understood apart from the cross, which the disciples did not yet understand (vs. 31–33 and ch. 9 vs. 30–32). This theological explanation is supported by Matthew's explicit link between Pharisaic conspiracy to "destroy" (Note: Matthew 12:14) Jesus and the latter's command to his followers "not to make him known." (Note: Matthew 12:16) Aware of the plot against him, Jesus "withdrew from there" and continued his healing ministry. (Note: Matthew 12:15) Matthew goes one step ahead and claims that Jesus' conscious decision to fulfil his ministry by avoiding untimely conflict was a fulfilment of Isaiah's prophecy, (Note: Isaiah 42:1–4)

Behold, my servant whom I have chosen, my beloved with whom my soul is well pleased. ... He will not quarrel or cry aloud, nor will anyone hear his voice in the streets; a bruised reed he will not break, and a smoldering wick he will not quench, until he brings justice to victory; and in his name the Gentiles will hope. (Note: Matthew 12:18–21)
