= Matthew 8 =

- ← chapter 7 chapter 9 →
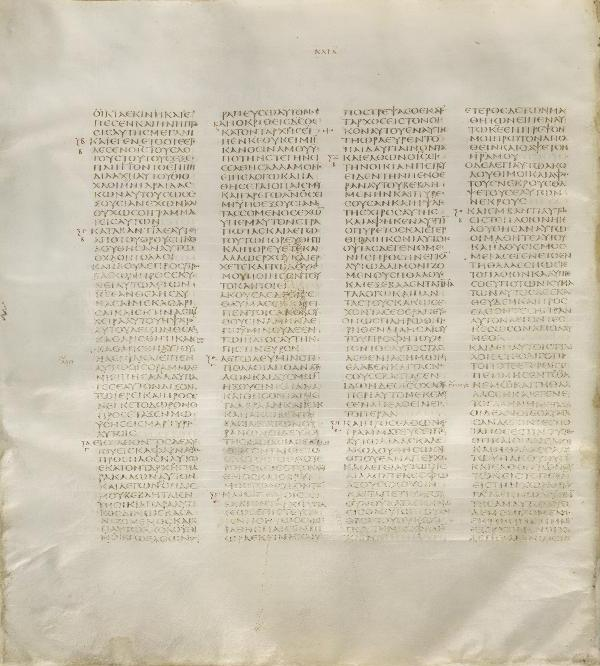
- Matthew 7:27–8:28 on Codex Sinaiticus (AD 330–60)
- Book: Gospel of Matthew
- Category: Gospel
- Christian Bible part: New Testament
- Order in the Christian part: 1

Matthew 8 is the eighth chapter of the Gospel of Matthew in the New Testament and continues the narrative about Jesus's ministry in Galilee previously described in Matthew 4:23–25. It follows on from the Sermon on the Mount, noting in its opening verse that Jesus had come down from the mountain where he had been teaching. There is a renewed focus in this chapter on Jesus's ministry of healing.

== Text ==
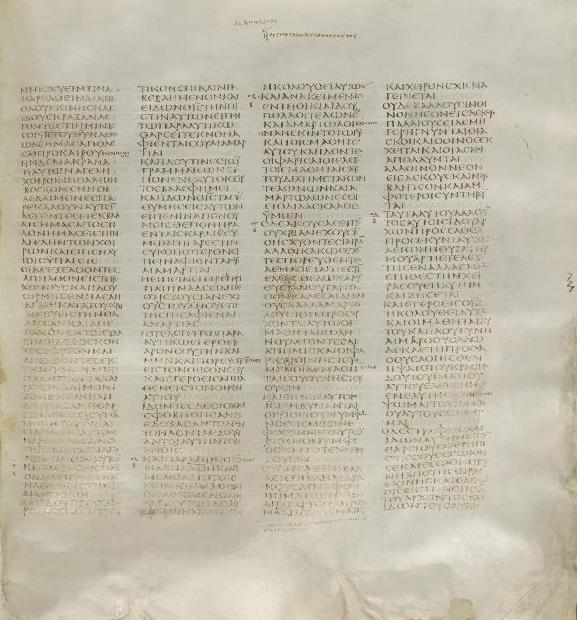
Codex Sinaiticus (AD 330–60), Matthew 8:28–9:23

The original text was written in Koine Greek. This chapter is divided into 34 verses.

=== Textual witnesses ===
Some early manuscripts containing the text of this chapter are:

- Codex Vaticanus (AD 325–50)
- Codex Sinaiticus (330–60)
- Codex Bezae (c. 400)
- Codex Washingtonianus (c. 400)
- Codex Ephraemi Rescriptus (c. 450; complete)

== Structure ==
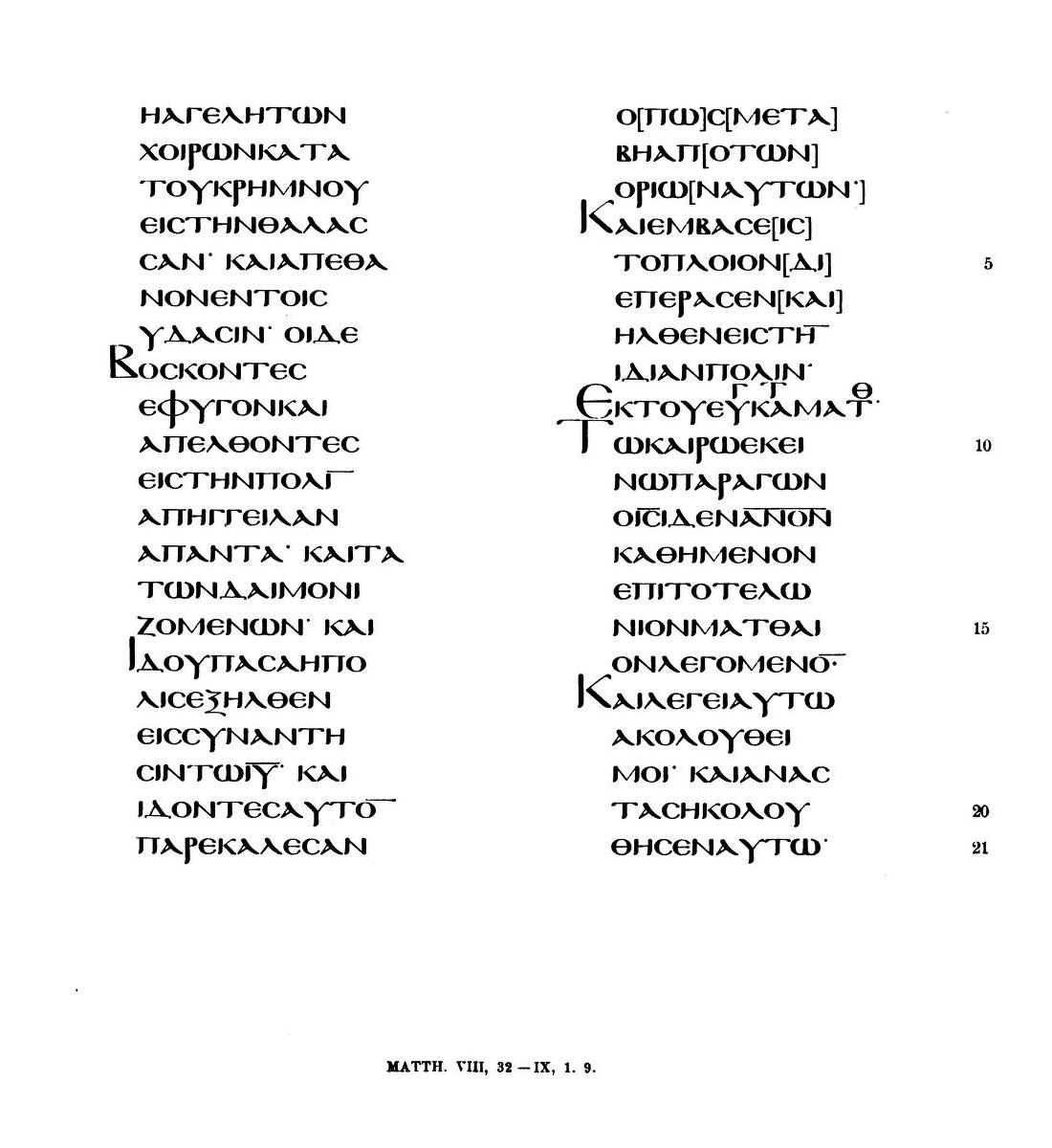
Matthew 8:32–9:1,9 in Lectionary 269

This chapter can be grouped (with cross references to parallel texts in the other canonical gospels):

- Matthew 8:1–4, where Jesus cleanses a leper, parallels Mark 1:40–45 and Luke 13:1–23
- Matthew 8:5–13, where Jesus heals the centurion's servant, parallels Luke 7:1–10 and John 4:46–53
- Matthew 8:14–15, where Jesus heals the mother of Peter's wife, parallels Mark 1:29–31 and Luke 4:38–39
- Matthew 8:16–17, where Jesus exorcises many people at sunset, parallels Mark 1:32–34 and Luke 4:40–41
- Matthew 8:18–20, in its illustration of the cost of discipleship, parallels Luke 9:57–58
- The phrase "let the dead bury their own dead" found in Matthew 8:21–22 parallels Luke 9:59–62
- Matthew 8:23–27, where Jesus calms the storm on the Sea of Galilee, parallels Mark 4:35–41 and Luke 8:22–25
- Matthew 8:28–34, where Jesus exorcises the Gerasene or Gergesene demoniacs, parallels Mark 5:1–20 and Luke 8:26–39

== Analysis ==
E. H. Plumptre, in Anglican bishop Charles Ellicott's Commentary for English Readers, commented that the events reported "are common to St. Mark and St. Luke, but are not narrated [...] in the same order". Free Church minister William Robertson Nicoll suggested that "this collection is not arranged in chronological order. The connection is topical, not temporal." In his opinion these stories "are an integral part of the self-revelation of Jesus by word and deed; they are demonstrations not merely of His power, but above all, of His spirit".

New Testament scholar Dale Allison notes that these "merciful deeds" performed by Jesus, along with those recorded in chapter 9, are all undertaken for the benefit of "people from the margins of Jewish society or without status". Henry Alford describes these deeds as a "solemn procession of miracles", whose record confirms "the authority with which our Lord had spoken".

The Jerusalem Bible notes that the ten miracles recorded in chapters 8 and 9 demonstrate the power of Jesus over nature, sickness, death and devils.

== See also ==
- Book of Leviticus
- Leper
- Moses
- Related Bible parts: Leviticus 14, Joshua 10, Isaiah 53, Mark 1, 4 and 5, Luke 4, 5, 7, 8 and 9, John 4
