= Matthew 6:30 =

- ← 6:29 6:31 →
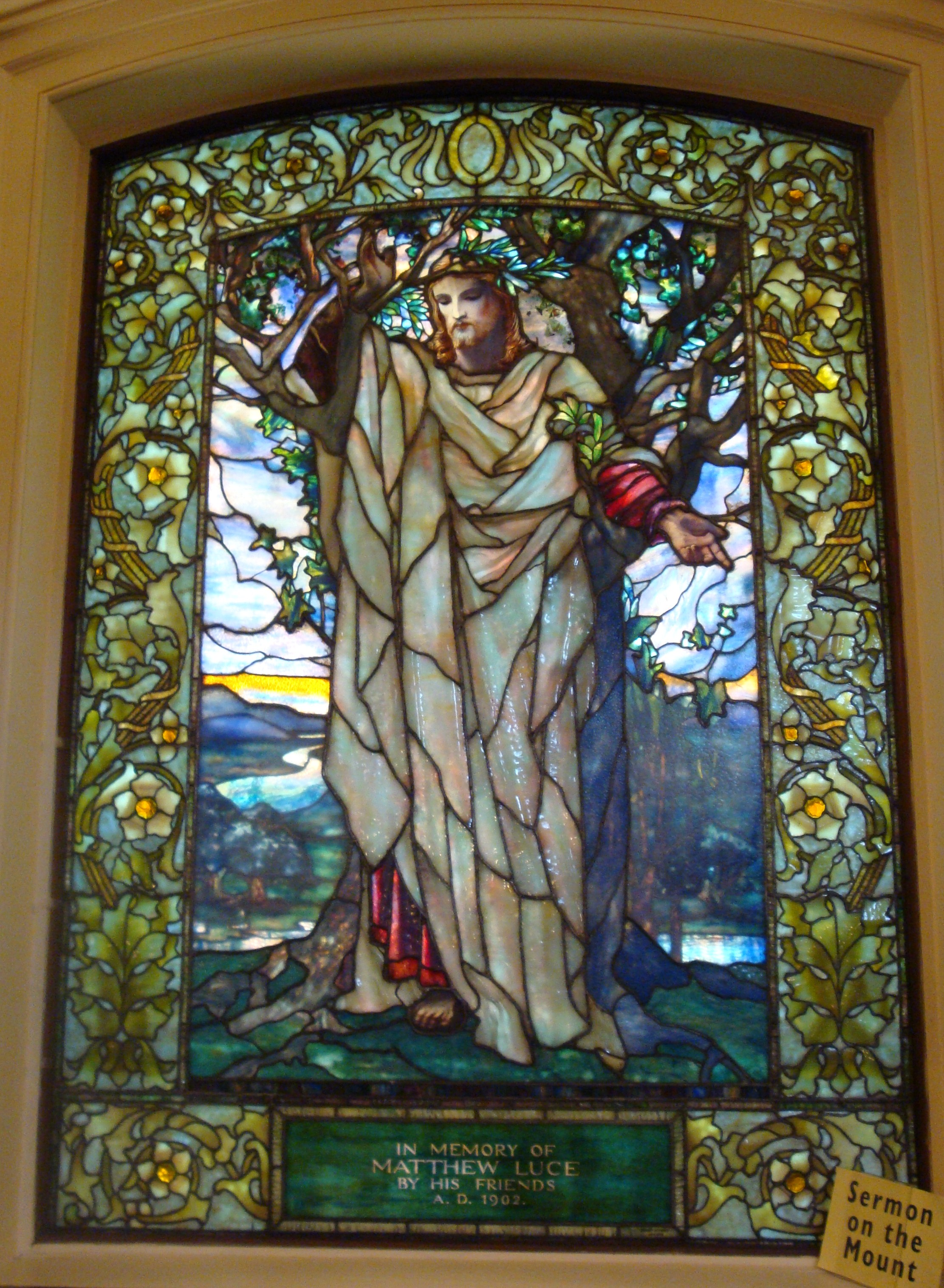
- "The Sermon on the Mount". Stained glass window created by Louis Comfort Tiffany in Arlington Street Church (Boston).
- Book: Gospel of Matthew
- Christian Bible part: New Testament

Matthew 6:30 is the thirtieth verse of the sixth chapter of the Gospel of Matthew in the New Testament and is part of the Sermon on the Mount. This verse continues the discussion of worry about material provisions.

== Content ==
In the King James Version of the Bible the text reads:

Wherefore, if God so clothe the grass of the field,
which to day is, and to morrow is cast into the oven,
shall he not much more clothe you, O ye of little faith?

The World English Bible translates the passage as:

But if God so clothes the grass of the field, which
today exists, and tomorrow is thrown into the oven,
won’t he much more clothe you, you of little faith? (Note: For a collection of other versions see BibleHub: Matthew 6:30)

The Novum Testamentum Graece text is:

εἰ δὲ τὸν χόρτον τοῦ ἀγροῦ σήμερον ὄντα
καὶ αὔριον εἰς κλίβανον βαλλόμενον ὁ Θεὸς οὕτως ἀμφιέννυσιν,
οὐ πολλῷ μᾶλλον ὑμᾶς, ὀλιγόπιστοι;

== Analysis ==
Jesus has been discussing the lilies in the field, and how even these simple flowers are more finely clothed than Solomon. In this verse he states that if God clothes the lowly flowers so grandly, he will certainly ensure that his human followers are properly clad. This is very similar to Matthew 6:26, with lilies and clothes in place of birds and food.

The grass of the field of this verse is presumed to be the lilies of Matthew 6:27, implying that Jesus was speaking of the abundant wild flowers that will fill local fields. Wood has always been in short supply in Palestine and the burning of grasses was an important source of fuel. William Barclay states that they were typically thrown into the clay ovens of the region when it was necessary to rapidly increase the heat. These ovens would be used to bake the bread the populace subsisted on.

There are two lessons generally read into this verse. The first is that beauty and the physical are fleeting: what is splendid one day can be thrown into the fire the next. This perhaps links with Matthew 6:20, where Jesus contrasts the impermanence of physical things with the eternal nature of the spiritual. Harrington links this verse to Isaiah 40:6–8, which also discussed the fleeting nature of grass and flowers. Secondly it shows how unimportant these flowers are. They are commonly sacrificed en masse for the simple task of baking bread, yet God provides them with beautiful raiments. If God provides for such lowly flowers, he would surely do so for the humans made in his image.

The Gospel of Thomas contains a version of this verse, but it comes to a very different conclusion, arguing that clothing is useless and should be dispensed with.

The noun of address "O ye of little faith", ολιγοπιστοι (oligopistoi), appears several times in the Gospels. Matthew uses the same phrase in verses 8:26 and 16:8, and it also appears in Luke 12:28. It is one of Jesus' strongest admonitions of his disciples.

== Commentary from the Church Fathers ==
Jerome: To-morrow [sic] in Scripture is put for time future in general. Jacob says, So shall my righteousness answer for me to-morrow. (Genesis 30:33.) And in the phantasm of Samuel, the Pythoness says to Saul, To-morrow shalt thou be with me. 1 Samuel 28:19.)

Glossa Ordinaria: Some copies have into the fire, or, into an heap, which has the appearance of an oven.

Chrysostom: He calls them no more lilies, but the grass of the field, to show their small worth; and adds moreover another cause of their small value; which to-day is. And He said not, and to-morrow [sic] is not, but what is yet greater fall, is cast into the oven. In that He says How much more you, is implicitly conveyed the dignity of the human race, as though He had said, You to whom He has given a soul, for whom He has contrived a body, to whom He has sent Prophets and gave His Only-begotten Son.

Glossa Ordinaria: He says, of little faith, for that faith is little which is not sure of even the least things.

Hilary of Poitiers: Or, under the signification of grass the Gentiles are pointed to. If then an eternal existence is only therefore granted to the Gentiles, that they may soon be handed over to the judgment fires; how impious it is that the saints should doubt of attaining to eternal glory, when the wicked have eternity bestowed on them for their punishment.

Saint Remigius: Spiritually, by the birds of the air are meant the Saints who are born again in the water of holy Baptism; and by devotion raise themselves above the earth and seek the skies. The Apostles are said to be of more value than these, because they are the heads of the Saints. By the lilies also may be understood the Saints, who without the toil of legal ceremonies pleased God by faith alone; of whom it is said, My Beloved, who feedeth among the lilies. (Cant. 2:16.) Holy Church also is understood by the lilies, because of the whiteness of its faith, and the odour of its good conversation, of which it is said in the same place, As the lily among the thorns. By the grass are denoted the unbelievers, of whom it is said, The grass hath dried up, and the flowers thereof faded. (Is. 40:7.) By the oven eternal damnation; so that the sense be, If God bestows temporal goods on the unbelievers, how much more shall He bestow on you eternal goods!

== See also ==
- Tomorrow (time)

== Notes ==
Preceded by Matthew 6:29	Gospel of Matthew; Chapter 6	Succeeded by Matthew 6:31
