= Matthew 6:31–32 =

- ← 6:30 6:33 →
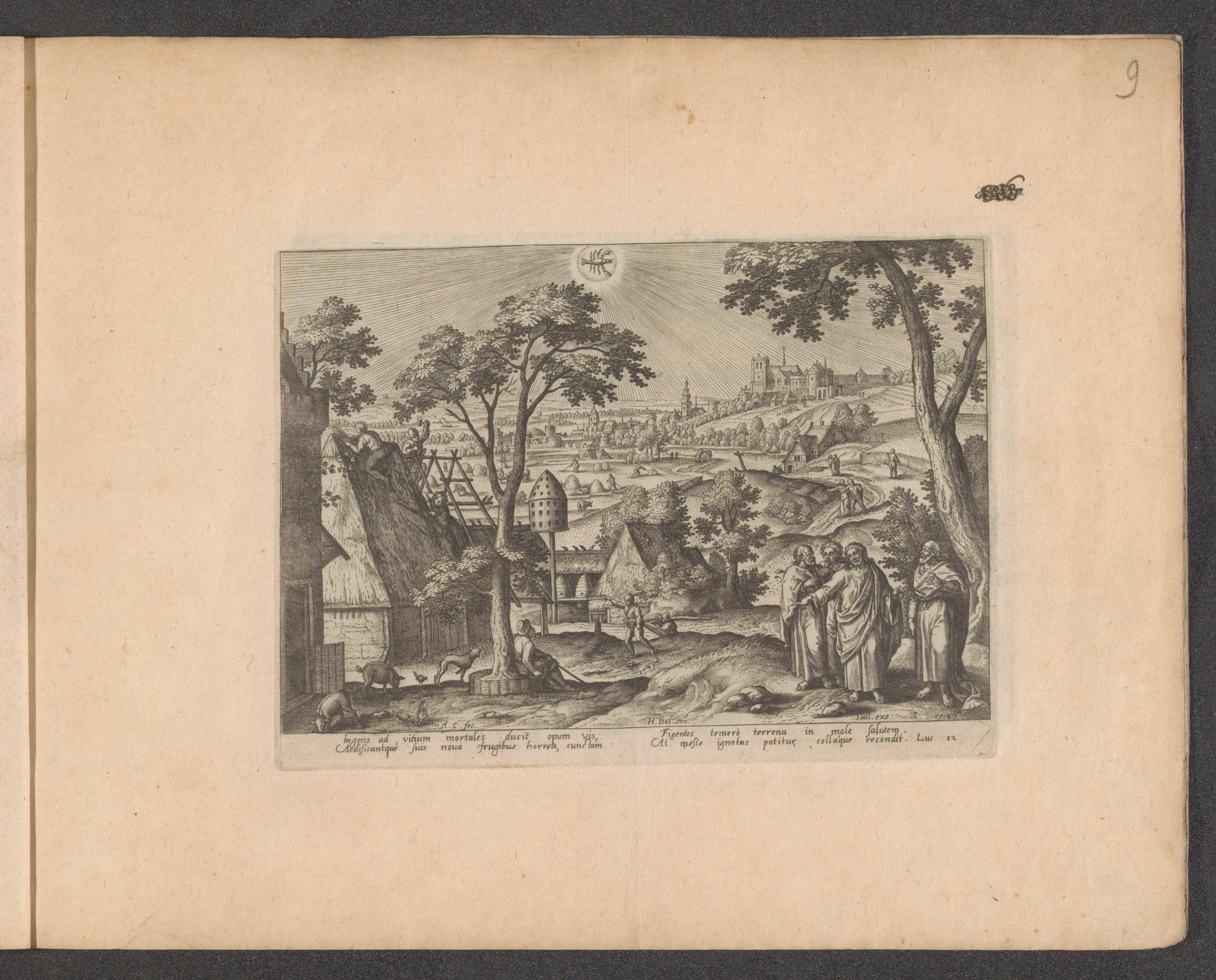
- Christ teaches his disciples not to worry about earthly things. Illustration by Adriaen Collaert (1585).
- Book: Gospel of Matthew
- Christian Bible part: New Testament

Matthew 6:31 and Matthew 6:32 are the thirty-first and thirty-second verses of the sixth chapter of the Gospel of Matthew in the New Testament and is part of the Sermon on the Mount. This verse continues the discussion of worry about material provisions.

== Content ==
In the King James Version of the Bible the text reads:

31 Therefore take no thought, saying, :What shall we eat? or,
What shall we drink? or, Wherewithal shall we be clothed?
32 (For after all these things do the Gentiles seek:) for your
heavenly Father knoweth that ye have need of all these things.

The World English Bible translates the passage as:

31 “Therefore don’t be anxious, saying, ‘What will we eat?’,
‘What will we drink?’ or, ‘With what will we be clothed?’
32 For the Gentiles seek after all these things; for your
heavenly Father knows that you need all these things.

The Novum Testamentum Graece text is:

31 μὴ οὖν μεριμνήσητε λέγοντες· Τί φάγωμεν;
ἤ· Τί πίωμεν; ἤ· Τί περιβαλώμεθα;
32 πάντα γὰρ ταῦτα τὰ ἔθνη ἐπιζητοῦσιν
οἶδεν γὰρ ὁ Πατὴρ ὑμῶν ὁ οὐράνιος ὅτι χρῄζετε τούτων ἁπάντων.

For a collection of other versions see BibleHub Matthew 6:31-32

== Analysis ==
Jesus has just been explaining why one need not be anxious, in Matthew 6:26 he presented an argument for why one need not worry about food, and in Matthew 6:28-30 he presents a similar one about clothing. After giving these explanations Jesus in this verse issues the clear command not to be anxious.

The Gentiles had earlier been presented as a bad example in Matthew 6:7. In this case Fowler notes that Gentiles might not be referring to non-Jews, but to all outside Jesus' group of disciples. In this verse Jesus mentions that such anxiety might be natural for the Gentiles, who have no God that provides for them, or who believe in capricious or unpredictable gods. Barclay rephrases this verse as stating that anxiety is impious as it represents doubt in God. For the true follower of God there should be no worry as God is aware of their needs and will meet them. Morris notes that the verse refers to God meeting the needs of his followers, not their desires, an important distinction.

== Commentary from the Church Fathers ==
Glossa Ordinaria: Having thus expressly cut off all anxiety concerning food and raiment, by an argument drawn from observation of the inferior creation, He follows it up by a further prohibition; Be not ye therefore careful, saying, What shall we eat, what shall we drink, or wherewithal shall we be clothed?

Saint Remigius: The Lord repeated this, that He might show how highly necessary this precept is, and that He might inculcate it more strongly on our hearts.

Rabanus Maurus: It should be observed that He does not say, Do not ye seek, or be thoughtful for, food, drink, and raiment, but what ye shall eat, what ye shall drink, or wherewithal ye shall be clothed. Wherein they seem to me to be convicted, who, using themselves the usual food and clothing, require of those with whom they live either greater sumptuousness, or greater austerity in both.

Glossa Ordinaria: There is also a further needless solicitude wherein men sin, when they lay by of produce or money more than necessity requires, and leaving spiritual things, are intent on these things, as though despairing of the goodness of God; this is what is forbidden; for after all these things do the Gentiles seek.

Pseudo-Chrysostom: Since their belief is that it is Fortune and not Providence that has place in human affairs, and think not that their lives are directed by God’s counsel, but follow the uncertain chance, they accordingly fear and despair, as having none to guide them. But he who believes that he is guided by God’s counsel, entrusts his provision of food to God’s hand; as it follows, for your Father knoweth that ye have need of these things.

Chrysostom: He said not ‘God knoweth,’ but, Your Father knoweth, in order to lead them to higher hope; for if He be their Father, He will not endure to forget his children, since not even human fathers could do so. He says, That ye have need of all these things, in order that for that very reason, because they are necessary, ye may the more lay aside all anxiety. For he who denies his son bare necessaries, after what fashion is he a father? But for superfluities they have no right to look with the like confidence.

Augustine: God did not gain this knowledge at any certain time, but before all time, without beginning of knowledge, foreknew that the things of the world would be, and among others, both what and when we should ask of Him.

Augustine: As to what some say that these things are so many that they cannot be compassed by the knowledge of God; they ought with like reason to maintain further that God cannot know all numbers which are certainly infinite. But infinity of number is not beyond the compass of His understanding, who is Himself infinite. Therefore if whatever is compassed by knowledge, is bounded by the compass of him that has the knowledge, then is all infinity in a certain unspeakable way bounded by God, because it is not incomprehensible by His knowledge.

== See also ==
- Divine filiation

Preceded by Matthew 6:30	Gospel of Matthew; Chapter 6	Succeeded by Matthew 6:33
