= Mammon =

Wealth or an entity that promises wealth

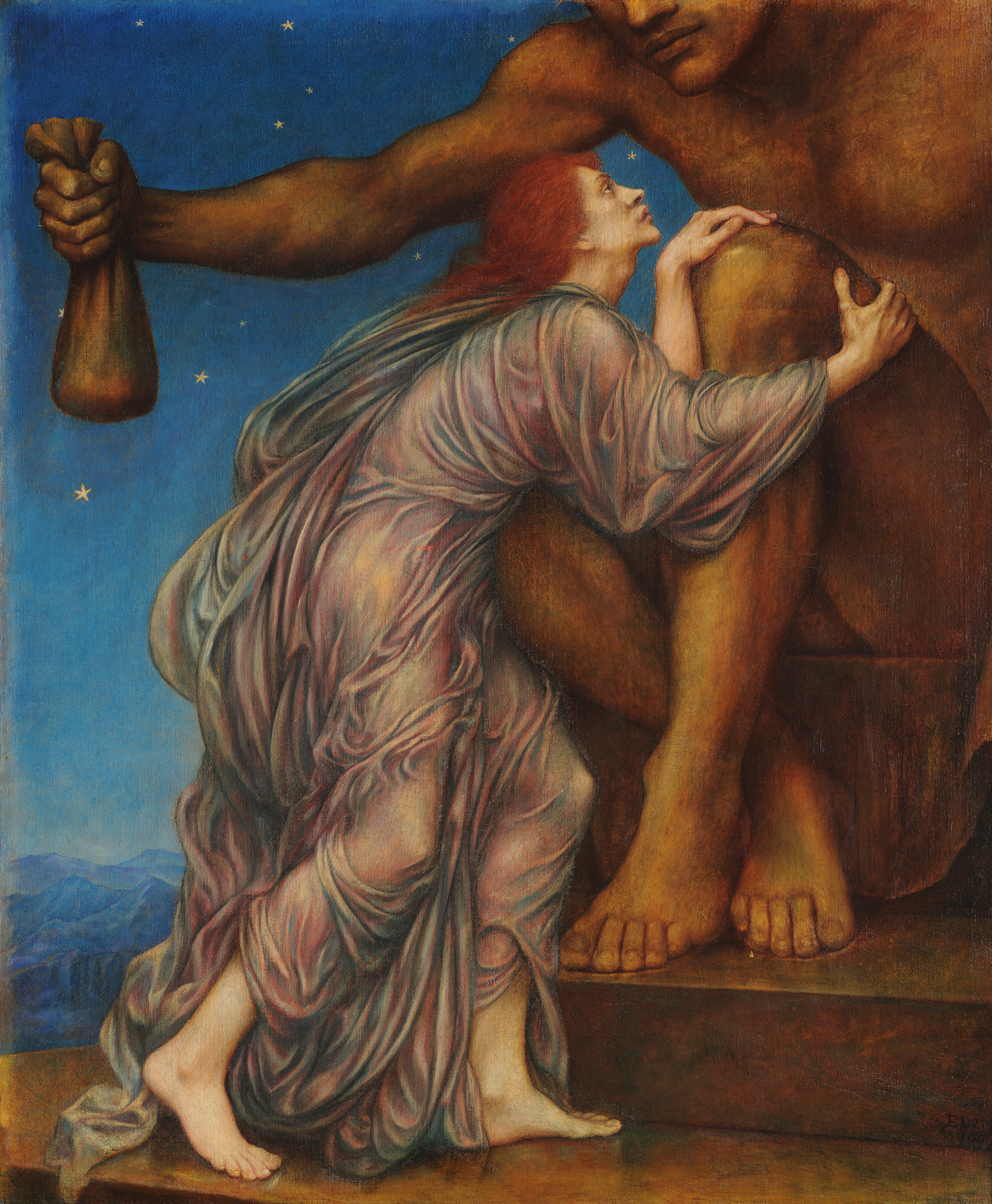
1909 painting The Worship of Mammon by Evelyn De Morgan

Cruikshank's The Worship of Wealth

Mammon (Aramaic: מָמוֹנָא, māmōnā) in the New Testament is commonly thought to mean money, material wealth, or any entity that promises wealth, and is associated with the greedy pursuit of gain. The Gospel of Matthew and the Gospel of Luke both quote Jesus using the word in a phrase often rendered in English as "You cannot serve both God and mammon."

In the Middle Ages, it was often personified and sometimes included in the seven princes of Hell, depicting greed. Mammon in Hebrew (ממון) means 'money'. The word was adopted to modern Hebrew to mean wealth.

== Etymology ==
The word Mammon comes into English from post-classical Latin mammona 'wealth', used most importantly in the Vulgate Bible (along with Tertullian's mammonas and pseudo-Jerome's mammon). This was in turn borrowed from Hellenistic Greek μαμωνᾶς (mamōnas), which appears in the New Testament, borrowed from Aramaic מָמוֹנָא māmōnā, an emphatic form of the word māmōn 'wealth, profit', perhaps specifically from the Syriac dialect. The spelling μαμμωνᾷ refers to "a Syrian deity, god of riches; Hence riches, wealth"; μαμωνᾶς is transliterated from Aramaic [ממון] and also means "wealth". However, it is not clear what the earlier history of the Aramaic form was. The word may have been present throughout the Canaanite languages: the word is unknown in Old Testament Hebrew, but has been found in the Qumran documents; post-biblical Hebrew attests to māmōn; and, according to Augustine of Hippo, Punic included the word mammon 'profit'. It has been suggested that the Aramaic word māmōn was a loanword from Mishnaic Hebrew ממון (mamôn) meaning money, wealth, or possessions; although it may also have meant "that in which one trusts".

According to the Textus Receptus of the New Testament, the Greek word translated "Mammon" is spelt in the dative case as [οὐ δύνασθε θεῷ δουλεύειν καὶ] μαμμωνᾷ in the Sermon on the Mount at Matthew 6:24, while in the Parable of the Unjust Steward at Luke 16, it appears respectively as [ἐκ τοῦ] μαμωνᾶ (genitive case) in verse 9, [ἐν τῷ ἀδίκῳ] μαμωνᾷ (dative case) in verse 11, and [οὐ δύνασθε θεῷ δουλεύειν καὶ] μαμωνᾷ (dative case) in verse 13. The 28th edition of the popular Critical Text of the New Testament has the same readings as the TR, except in Matthew: μαμωνᾷ. The LSJ has a listing for only [nominative:] μαμωνᾶς, [genitive ending:] ᾶ, with entry "wealth. Ev.Luc 16.9, al. (Aramaic word)," without any entry for the -μμ- form. The Authorised Version uses "Mammon" for both Greek spellings; John Wycliffe uses richessis.

The Revised Standard Version of the Bible says it is "a Semitic word for money or riches". The International Children's Bible (ICB) uses the wording "You cannot serve God and money at the same time".

Christians began to use "mammon" as a term that was used to describe gluttony, excessive materialism, greed, and unjust worldly gain.

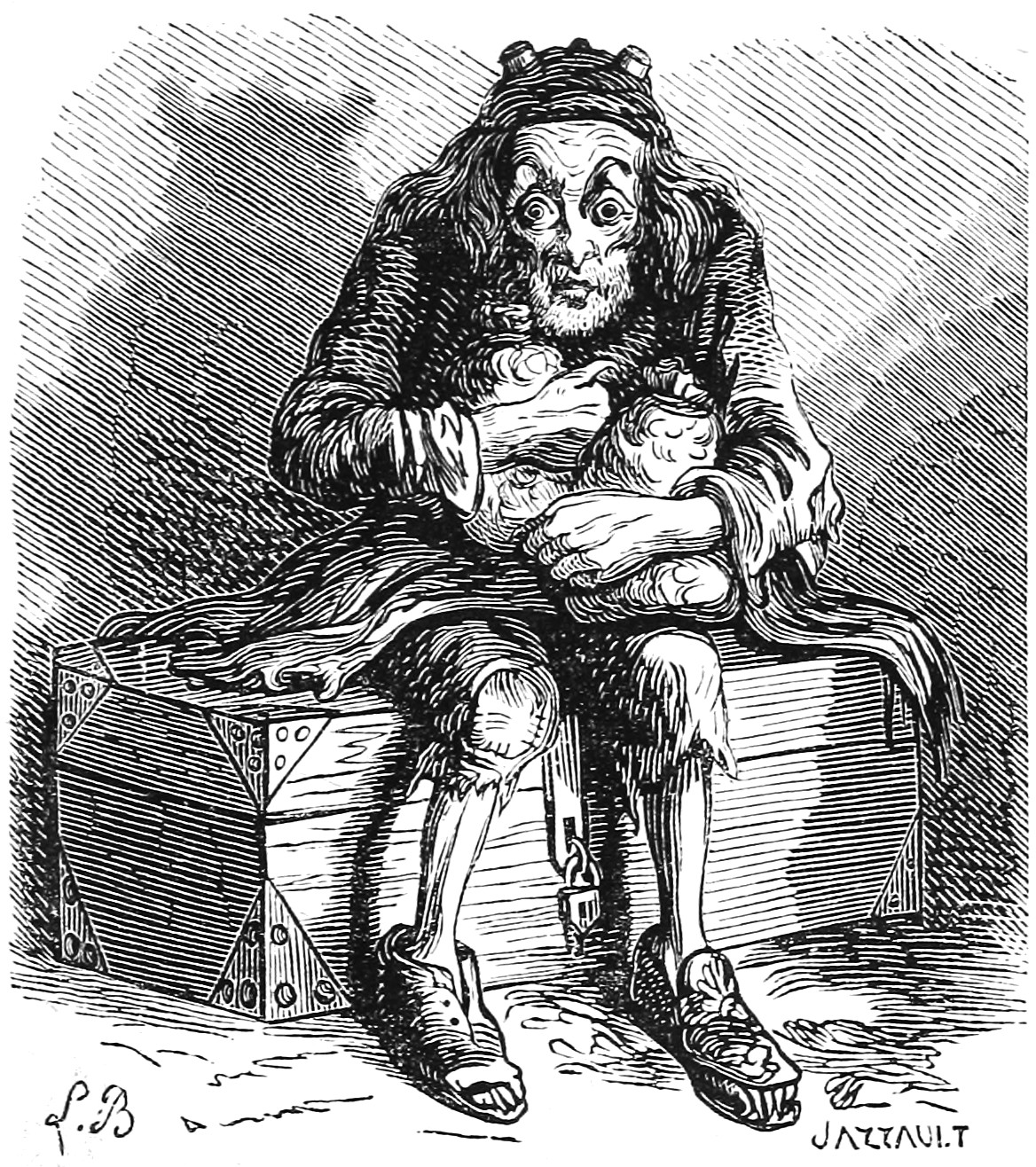
Mammon from Collin de Plancy's Dictionnaire Infernal

Lay not up for yourselves treasures upon earth, where moth and rust doth corrupt, and where thieves break through and steal: But lay up for yourselves treasures in heaven, where neither moth nor rust doth corrupt, and where thieves do not break through nor steal: For where your treasure is, there will your heart be also. No man can serve two masters: for either he will hate the one, and love the other; or else he will hold to the one, and despise the other. Ye cannot serve God and mammon.

— Matthew 6:19–21, 24 (KJV)

Early mentions of Mammon allude to the Gospels, e.g., Didascalia, "De solo Mammona cogitant, quorum Deus est sacculus" (lit. They think only of Mammon, whose God is the purse); and Saint Augustine, "Lucrum Punice Mammon dicitur" (lit. "Riches is called Mammon by the Phoenicians" (Sermon on the Mount, ii).

== Personifications ==
Gregory of Nyssa also asserted that Mammon was another name for Beelzebub.

In the 4th century Cyprian and Jerome relate Mammon to greed and greed as an evil master that enslaves, and John Chrysostom even personifies Mammon as greed.

During the Middle Ages, Mammon was commonly personified as the demon of wealth and greed. Thus Peter Lombard (II, dist. 6) says, "Riches are called by the name of a devil, namely Mammon, for Mammon is the name of a devil, by which name riches are called according to the Syrian tongue." Piers Plowman also regards Mammon as a deity. Nicholas de Lyra, commenting on the passage in Luke, says: "Mammon est nomen daemonis" (Mammon is the name of a demon).

Albert Barnes in his Notes on the New Testament states that Mammon was a Syriac word for an idol worshipped as the god of riches, similar to Plutus among the Greeks, but he cited no authority for the statement.

No trace, however, of any Syriac god of such a name exists, and the common literary identification of the name with a god of covetousness or avarice likely stems from Spenser's The Faerie Queene, where Mammon oversees a cave of worldly wealth. Milton's Paradise Lost describes a fallen angel who values earthly treasure over all other things. Later occultist writings such as Jacques Collin de Plancy's Dictionnaire Infernal describe Mammon as Hell's ambassador to England. For Thomas Carlyle in Past and Present (1843), the "Gospel of Mammonism" became simply a metaphoric personification for the materialist spirit of the 19th century.

Mammon is somewhat similar to the Greek god Plutus, and the Roman Dis Pater, in his description, and it is likely that he was at some point based on them; especially since Plutus appears in The Divine Comedy as a wolf-like demon of wealth, wolves having been associated with greed in the Middle Ages. Thomas Aquinas metaphorically described the sin of Avarice as "Mammon being carried up from Hell by a wolf, coming to inflame the human heart with Greed".

Under the influence of the Social Gospel movement, American populists, progressives and "muck-rakers" during the generation of 1880–1925 used "Mammon" with specific reference to the consolidated wealth and power of the banking and corporate institutions headquartered on Wall Street and their predatory activities nationwide.

== In various countries ==
- "Mamona" (sometimes "Mamuna") is a synonym for mammon among Slavs. In the 21st century, the word mamona is used figuratively and derogatorily in Polish as a synonym of money. In Slovak the word mamonár is sometimes used to refer to a greedy person.
- The word "mammona" is quite often used in the Finnish and Estonian languages as a synonym of material wealth.
- In German, the word Mammon is a colloquial and contemptuous term for "money", usually as a phrase in combination with the adjective schnöde ("der schnöde Mammon" = the contemptible mammon).

== In literature ==
The 1409 Lollard manuscript titled Lanterne of Light associated Mammon with the deadly sin of greed.

In Past and Present (1843), Thomas Carlyle describes Victorian England's worship of money as the "Gospel of Mammonism".

== In popular culture ==
Numerous characters and demons are named Mammon in books, film, television, and games

== See also ==
- Asceticism
- Christian demons in popular culture
- Christian views on poverty and wealth
- Evangelical counsels
- Jewish views of poverty, wealth and charity
- Prosperity theology
- Seven deadly sins
- Vow of poverty
