= Matthew 6:25 =

- ← 6:24 6:26 →
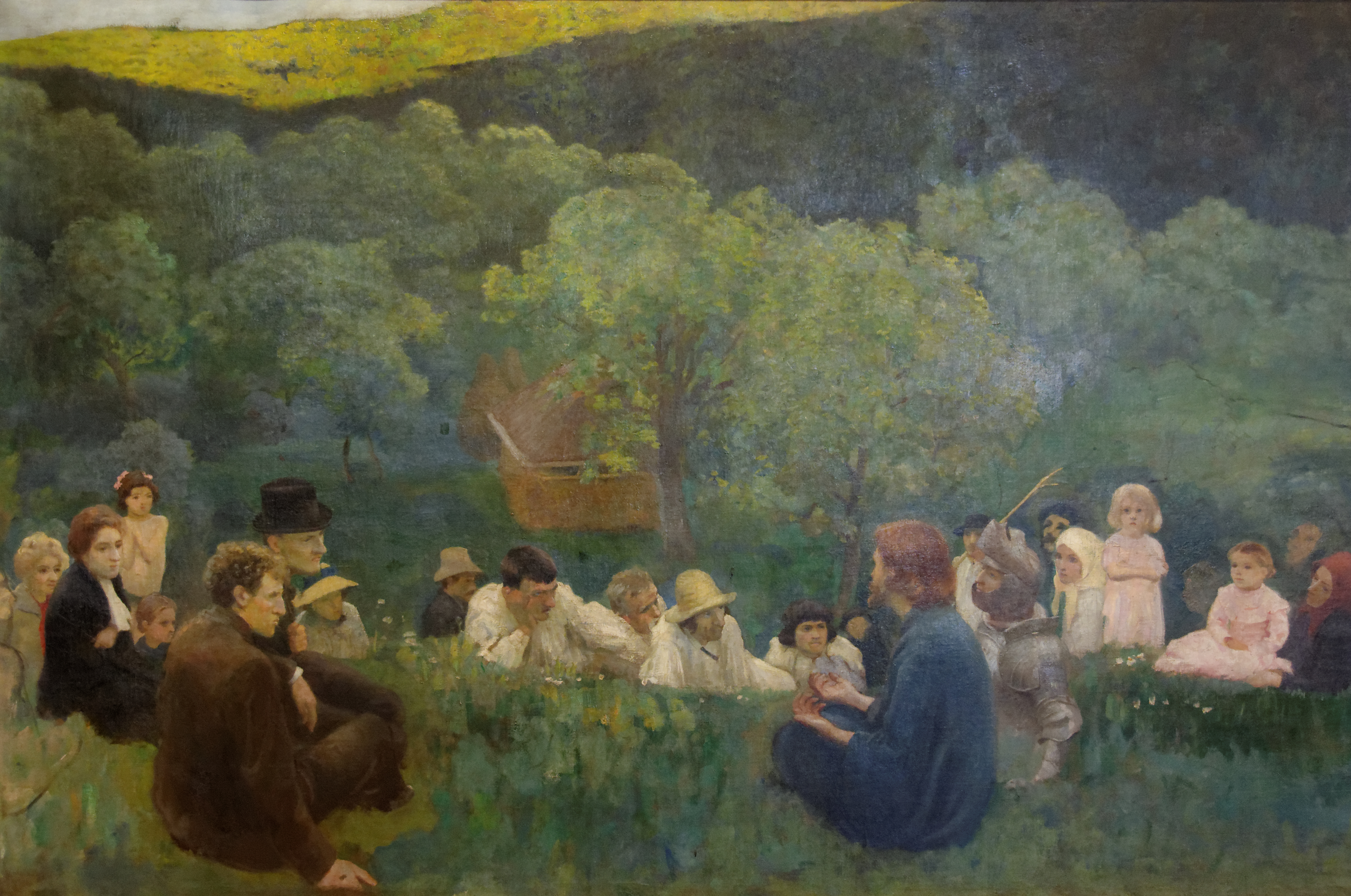
- "Sermon on the Mountain" (1896) by Károly Ferenczy (1862–1917).
- Book: Gospel of Matthew
- Christian Bible part: New Testament

Matthew 6:25 is the twenty-fifth verse of the sixth chapter of the Gospel of Matthew in the New Testament and is part of the Sermon on the Mount. This verse shifts the discussion from one of money to one of worry.

== Content ==
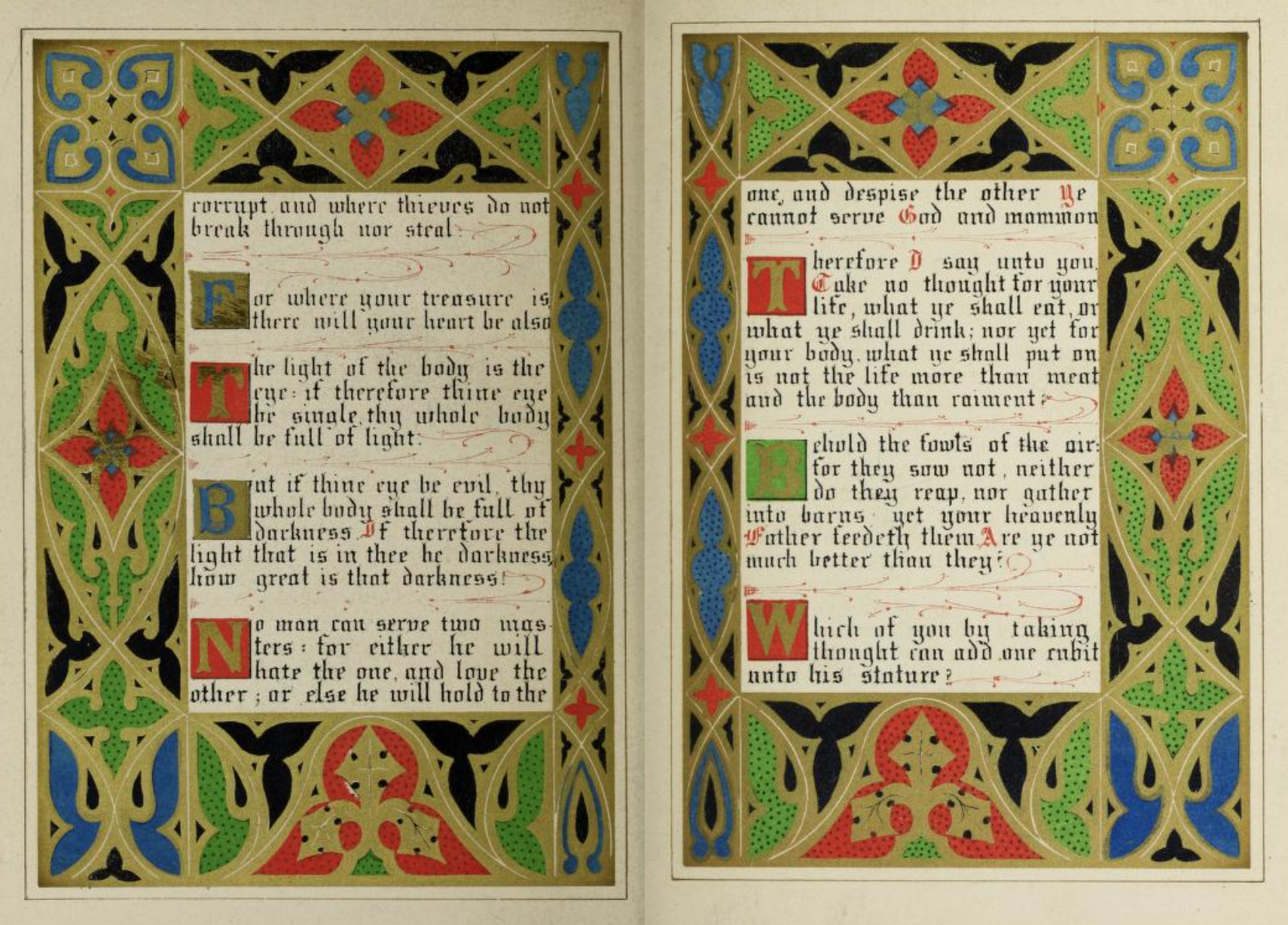
Matthew 6:21–27 from the 1845 illuminated book of The Sermon on the Mount, designed by Owen Jones.

In Koine Greek it reads:

Διὰ τοῦτο λέγω ὑμῖν, μὴ μεριμνᾶτε τῇ ψυχῇ ὑμῶν τί φάγητε ἢ τί πίητε, μηδὲ τῷ σώματι ὑμῶν τί ἐνδύσησθε· οὐχὶ ἡ ψυχὴ πλεῖόν ἐστιν τῆς τροφῆς καὶ τὸ σῶμα τοῦ ἐνδύματος;
Dia touto legō hymin, mě merimnate tē psychē hymōn ti phagēte ē ti piēte, mēde tō sōmati hymōn ti endysēsthe. Ouchi hē psychē pleion estin tēs trophēs kai to sōma tou endymatos?

In the King James Version of the Bible the text reads:

Therefore I say unto you, Take no thought for
your life, what ye shall eat, or what ye shall drink;
nor yet for your body, what ye shall put on. Is not
the life more than meat, and the body than raiment?

The World English Bible translates the passage as:

Therefore, I tell you, don’t be anxious for your life:
what you will eat, or what you will drink; nor yet
for your body, what you will wear. Isn’t life more
than food, and the body more than clothing?

The Novum Testamentum Graece text is:

Διὰ τοῦτο λέγω ὑμῖν, μὴ μεριμνᾶτε τῇ ψυχῇ ὑμῶν
τί φάγητε, ἢ τί πίητε μηδὲ τῷ σώματι ὑμῶν τί ἐνδύσησθε
οὐχὶ ἡ ψυχὴ πλεῖόν ἐστιν τῆς τροφῆς
καὶ τὸ σῶμα τοῦ ἐνδύματος;

For a collection of other versions see BibleHub Matthew 6:25

== Analysis ==
Jesus has just told his followers that it is impossible to serve both God and wealth. In this verse he begins a discussion of why one should not be over anxious about all material things. The word “more than” in this context means that the first object being compared exists even without the second. Thus “life (or the soul — see below) continues even without sustenance” including after death according to both Greek and Jewish beliefs in an eternal soul, and “the body continues even without clothes,” that is you can live even naked. With the second phrase explaining the first, this is the lesson: it is against reason to worry about non-essential things (sustenance and clothes) and neglect the essential (the body and its health, and the soul and its obedience to God).

Fowler notes that the early manuscripts are divided on whether the verse includes the question "what will you drink." The absence of this question would make a clearer parallel with later verses, as while the questions about food and clothing are answered, this one is not.

The word translated as life could also refer to the soul, but writers of the period did not see a distinction between the two concepts. So when Jesus states that one should not be anxious about one's soul, it is likely that this is meant in the Jewish sense of vitality or vigor, rather than the Christian theological idea of the soul. Thus the soul, which in this verse is portrayed as both eating or drinking, is more accurately translated as life. The word translated in this verse as eat is the same word frequently translated as rust in Matthew 6:19.

== Commentary from the Church Fathers ==
Augustine: The Lord had taught above, that whoso desires to love God, and to take heed not to offend, should not think that he can serve two masters; lest though perhaps he may not look for superfluities, yet his heart may become double for the sake of very necessaries, and his thoughts bent to obtain them. Therefore, I say unto you, Be not ye careful for your 1life what ye shall eat, or for your body what ye shall put on.

Chrysostom: He does not hereby mean that the 1spirit needs food, for it is incorporeal, but He speaks according to common usage, for the soul cannot remain in the body unless the body be fed.

Augustine: Or we may understand the soul in this place to be put for the animal life.

Jerome: Some MSS. add here, nor what ye shall drinkb. That which belongs naturally to all animals alike, to brutes and beasts of burden as well as to man, from all thought of this we are not freed. But we are bid not to be anxious what we should eat, for in the sweat of our face we earn our bread; the toil is to be undergone, the anxiety put away. This Be not careful, is to be taken of bodily food and clothing; for the food and clothing of the spirit it becomes us to be always careful.

Augustine: There are certain heretics called Euchitæc, who hold that a monk may not do any work even for his support; who embrace this profession that they may be freed from necessity of daily labour.

Chrysostom: Or we may connect the context otherwise; When the Lord had inculcated contempt of money, that none might say, How then shall we be able to live when we have given up our all? He adds, Therefore, I say unto you, Take no thought for your life.

Glossa Ordinaria: That is, Be not withdrawn by temporal cares from things eternal.

Jerome: The command is therefore, not to be anxious what we shall eat. For it is also commanded, that in the sweat of our face we must eat bread. Toil therefore is enjoined, carking forbidden,

Pseudo-Chrysostom: Bread may not be gained by carefulness of spirit, but by toil of body; and to them that will labour it abounds, God bestowing it as a reward of their industry; and is lacking to the idle, God withdrawing it as punishment of their sloth. The Lord also confirms our hope, and descending first from the greater to the less, says, Is not the life more than meat, and the body than raiment?

Jerome: He who has given the greater, will He not also give the less?

Pseudo-Chrysostom: For had He not willed that that which was should be preserved, He had not created it; but what He so created that it should be preserved by food, it is necessary that He give it food, as long as He would have it to be preserved.

Hilary of Poitiers: Otherwise; Because the thoughts of the unbelievers were ill-employed respecting care of things future, cavilling concerning what is to be the appearance of our bodies in the resurrection, what the food in the eternal life, therefore He continues, Is not the life more than food? He will not endure that our hope should hang in care for the meat and drink and clothing that is to be in the resurrection, lest there should be affront given to Him who has given us the more precious things, in our being anxious that He should also give us the lesser.

Preceded by Matthew 6:24	Gospel of Matthew; Chapter 6	Succeeded by Matthew 6:26
