= Mamona =

Mamona may refer to:

- Patrícia Mamona (born 1988), Portuguese triple jumper.
- Mammon, a demon or deity of greed or material wealth
- Mamona, or ternera a la llanera, a traditional type of Colombian and Venezuelan barbecue.
- Mamona, a name used in South America for Ricinus or castor oil plant
