= Matthew 6:23 =

- ← 6:22 6:24 →
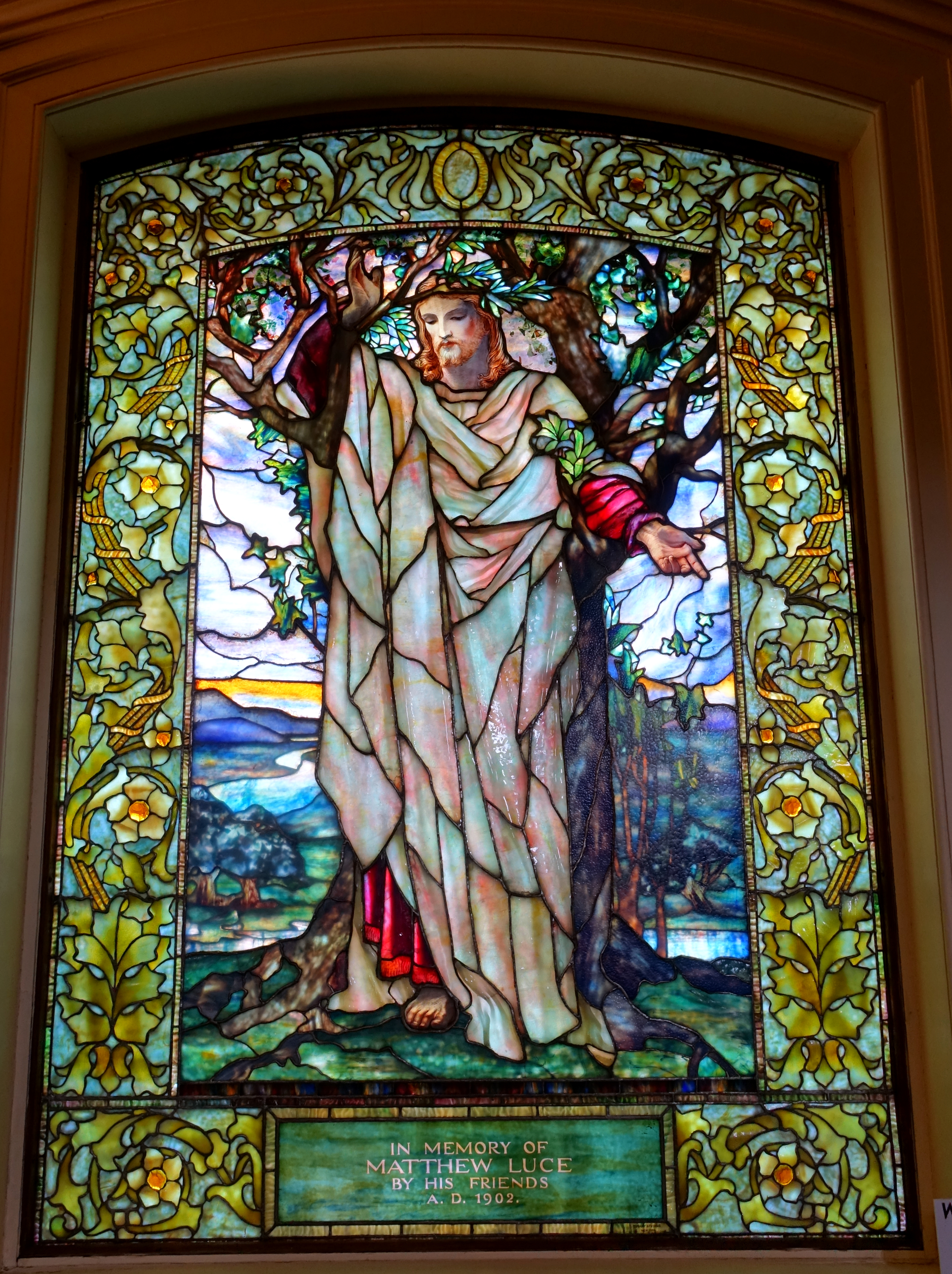
- "Sermon on the Mount". Tiffany stained glass window in the Arlington Street Church, Boston, Massachusetts.
- Book: Gospel of Matthew
- Christian Bible part: New Testament

Matthew 6:23 is the twenty-third verse of the sixth chapter of the Gospel of Matthew in the New Testament and is part of the Sermon on the Mount.

== Content ==
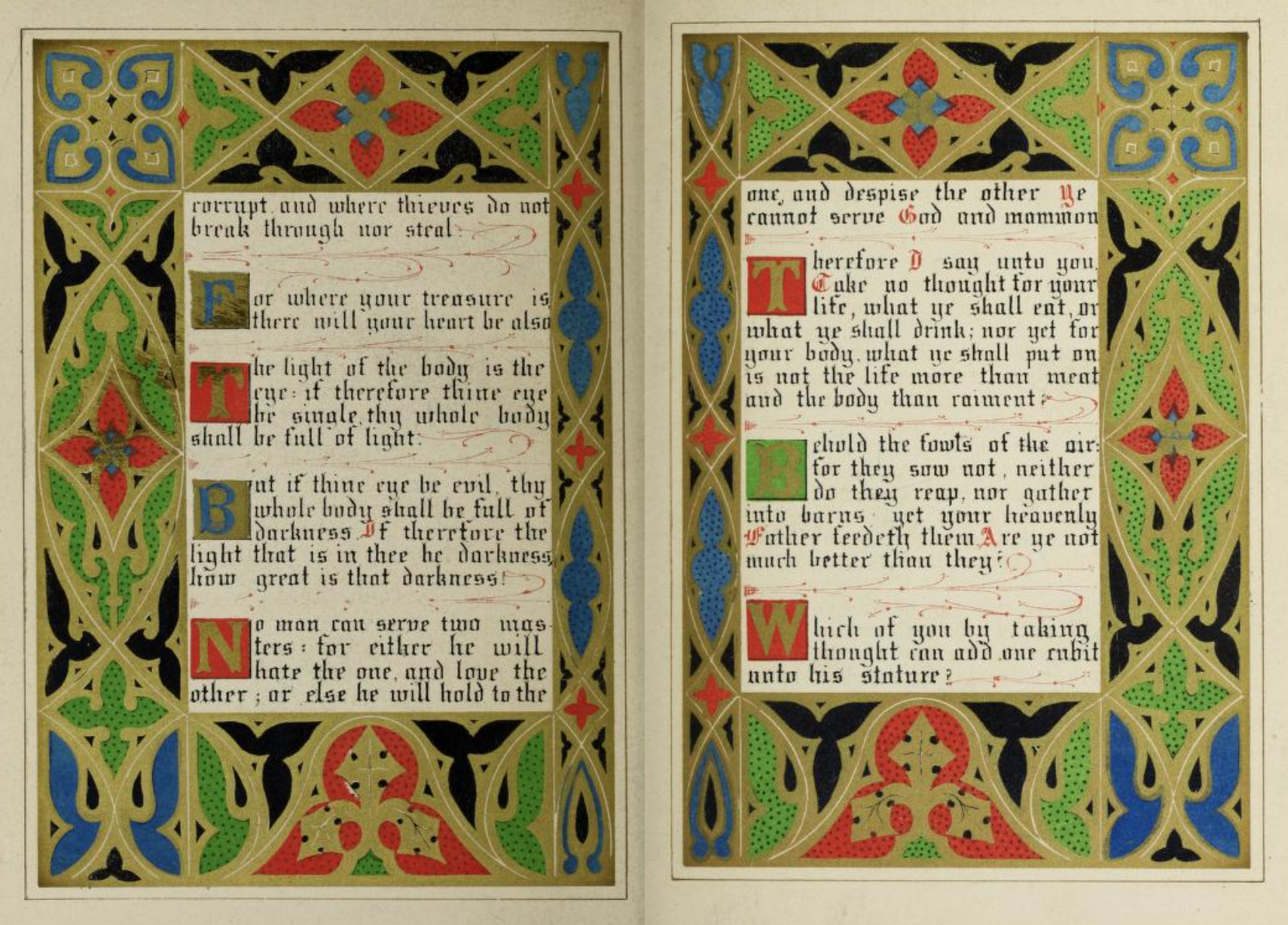
Matthew 6:21–27 from the 1845 illuminated book of The Sermon on the Mount, designed by Owen Jones.

In the King James Version of the Bible the text reads:

But if thine eye be evil, thy whole body shall
be full of darkness. If therefore the light that is in
thee be darkness, how great is that darkness!

The World English Bible translates the passage as:

But if your eye is evil, your whole body will be
full of darkness. If therefore the light that is in you
is darkness, how great is the darkness!

The Novum Testamentum Graece text is:

ἐὰν δὲ ὁ ὀφθαλμός σου πονηρὸς ᾖ,
ὅλον τὸ σῶμά σου σκοτεινὸν ἔσται.
εἰ οὖν τὸ φῶς τὸ ἐν σοὶ σκότος ἐστίν, τὸ σκότος πόσον.

For a collection of other versions see BibleHub Matthew 6:23.

== Analysis ==
The previous verse established a somewhat ambiguous metaphor of the generous/undivided eye being the source of light in the body. This verse presents the opposite stating that an evil eye plunges one into darkness. The evil eye was both an expression of jealousy and stinginess (cf. Matthew 20:15).

The verse puts great emphasis on the depth of darkness that a poor spiritual eye will place a person in, because placing too much focus on wealth or possessions can distort judgment. Morris feels that it implies that those who are so blinded cannot even realize that they are in darkness. John Phillips suggests that here Jesus teaches the possibility of having a "spiritual astigmatism" (failing to converge vision in one focal point), and urges the disciples to have a "single" eye to "see through the folly of laying up treasure on earth and keeps the next world in proper focus".

The metaphor of light as holiness and darkness as evil is also found in the Qumran literature and the Gospel of John.

== Commentary from the Church Fathers ==
Augustine: But acts which are known to be in themselves sins, are not to be done as with a good purpose; but such works only as are either good or bad, according as the motives from which they are done are either good or bad, and are not in themselves sins; as to give food to the poor is good if it be done from merciful motives, but evil if it is done from ostentation. But such works as are in themselves sins, who will say that they are to be done with good motives, or that they are not sins? Who would say, Let us rob the rich, that we may have to give to the poor?

Gregory the Great: Otherwise; if the light that is in thee, that is, if what we have begun to do well, we overcloud with evil purpose, when we do things which we know to be in themselves evil, how great is the darkness!

Saint Remigius: Otherwise; faith is likened to a light, because by it the goings of the inner man, that is, action, are lightened, that he should not stumble according to that, Thy word is a light to my feet. (Ps. 119:105.) If that then be pure and single, the whole body is light; but if defiled, the whole body will be dark. Yet otherwise; by the light may be understood the ruler of the Church, who may be well called the eye, as he it is that ought to see that wholesome things be provided for the people under him, which are understood by the body. If then the ruler of the Church errs, how much more will the people subject to him err?

== Sources ==
- Hill, David. The Gospel of Matthew. Grand Rapids: Eerdmans, 1981

Preceded by Matthew 6:22	Gospel of Matthew; Chapter 6	Succeeded by Matthew 6:24
