= Singleness of heart =

Singleness of heart (also called singleheartedness) is the ideal of having sole devotion to a task or endeavour. It is normally employed in a religious or spiritual context. In antiquity it was thought of as a counteraction to the divisive effects of civilization on the soul. It is especially associated with the practices of Christian monasticism.

Jesus, as recorded by Matthew 6:22, said:

^{22} The light of the body is the eye: if therefore thine eye be single, thy whole body shall be full of light.

Johann Bengel argues that the Pharisees in Luke's Gospel, who derided Jesus' teaching on singleness of heart, also considered themselves "accomplished" in the skills of serving two masters.

Referring to the desert landscape inhabited by the earliest Christian monks, Peter Brown, in A History of Private Life, explains:

The bleak, asocial landscape of the desert was a distant image of Paradise – the first, the true home of humankind, where Adam and Eve had dwelt in full majesty, before the subtle and overpowering onset of the doublehearted cares of human life in settled society, before marriage, physical greed, the labor of the earth, and the grinding cares of present human society robbed them of their original serenity. Totally singlehearted, therefore joined with the angelic hosts in unfailing and undivided praise of God, the life of the monk mirrored on earth the life of the angels. (Paul Veyne, editor. Harvard: 1987. Volume I, p. 289)

Søren Kierkegaard expressed a similar concept in his maxim "Purity of heart is to will one thing" and his sermon-form essay bearing that title.
