= Matthew 6:28 =

- ← 6:27 6:29 →
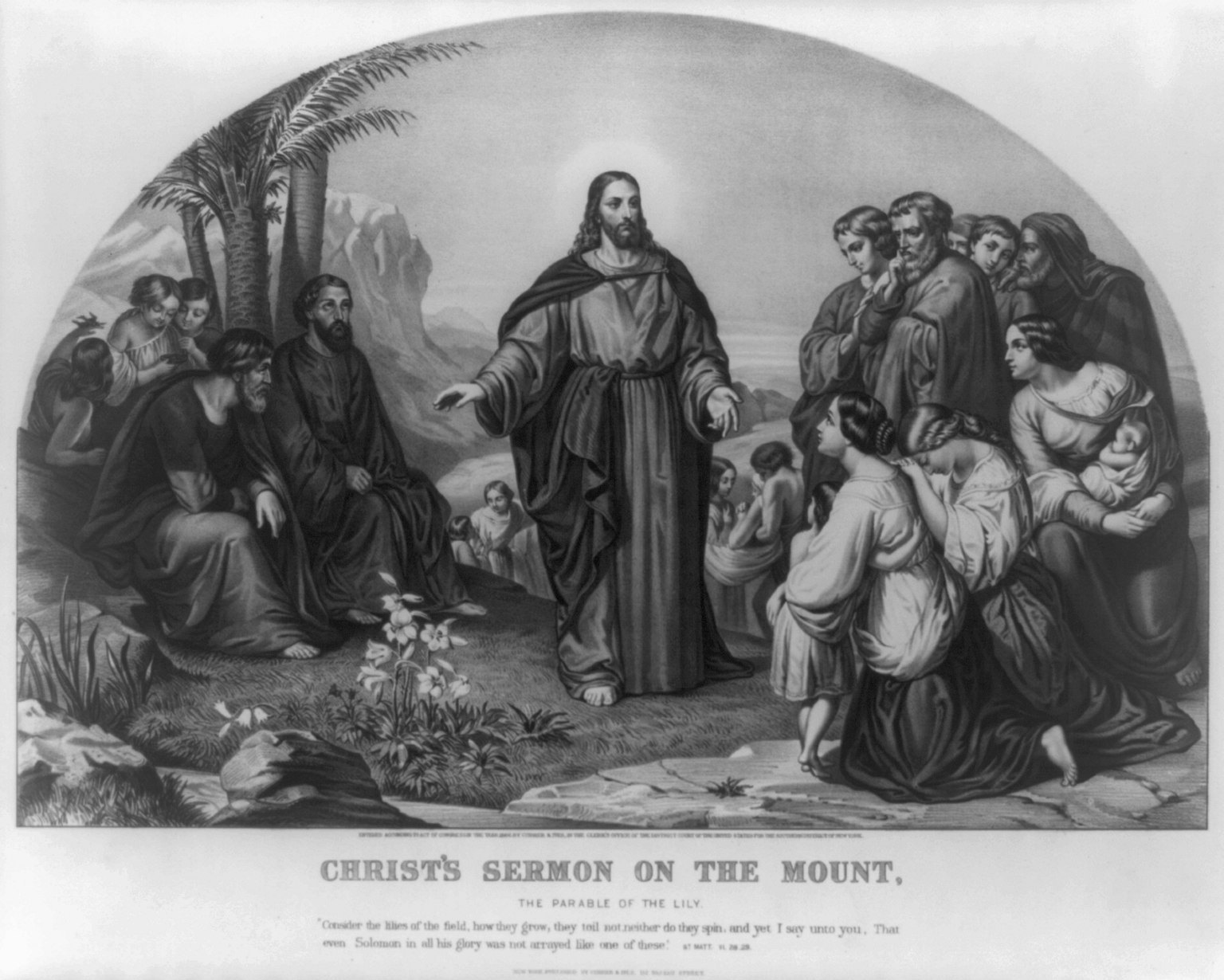
- Christ's sermon on the mount: The parable of the lily (1866).
- Book: Gospel of Matthew
- Christian Bible part: New Testament

Matthew 6:28 is the twenty-eighth verse of the sixth chapter of the Gospel of Matthew in the New Testament and is part of the Sermon on the Mount. This verse continues the discussion of worry about material provisions.

== Content ==
In the King James Version of the Bible the text reads:

And why take ye thought for raiment?

Consider the lilies of the field, how they grow;

they toil not, neither do they spin:

The World English Bible translates the passage less poetically as:

Why are you anxious about clothing?
Consider the lilies of the field, how they grow.
They don't toil, neither do they spin.

The Novum Testamentum Graece text is:

καὶ περὶ ἐνδύματος τί μεριμνᾶτε;
καταμάθετε τὰ κρίνα τοῦ ἀγροῦ πῶς αὐξάνουσιν
οὐ κοπιῶσιν οὐδὲ νήθουσιν

A similar passage appears in Luke 12:27, which in the King James Version reads:

Consider the lilies how they grow: they toil not, they spin not; and yet I say unto you, that Solomon in all his glory was not arrayed like one of these.

== Commentary ==
Two verses earlier, in Matthew 6:26, Jesus told his followers not to worry about food, because even the birds are provided for by God. In this verse Jesus presents the example of the lilies, who also do no labour. Spin in this verse is a reference to spinning thread, a labour-intensive but necessary part of making clothing. Spinning was traditionally women's work, something made explicit in Luke's version of this verse. This then is one of the few pieces of evidence that Jesus' message is meant equally for women as for men.

Pope Francis sees Jesus' consideration of the lilies as an example of "the sensitivity of Jesus before the creatures of his Father".

Many varieties of flowers grow wild in abundance in Galilee. The translation of lilies is traditional, but far from certain. Modern scholars have proposed a number of different flowers that Jesus could be here referring to (the Greek word is κρίνον, krinon), according to Fowler these include the autumn crocus, scarlet poppy, Turk's cap lily, Anemone coronaria, the narcissus, the gladiolus, and the iris. Another candidate is the autumn-flowering Sternbergia lutea, one of the English common names of which is 'lily-of-the field'. France notes that flowers were less specifically defined in that era, and lily could be a word referring to any showy variety. The verse could also just mean flowers in general, rather than a specific variety. "In the field" implies that these are the wildflowers growing in the fields, rather than the cultivated ones growing in gardens. Harrington notes that some have read this verse as originally referring to beasts rather than flowers.

== Cultural references ==
This verse is quite a well known one, appearing frequently in art and literature. Keats' "Ode on Indolence" quotes it. P.G. Wodehouse humorously uses the phrase "lilies of the field" to refer to the idle rich who do no labour. Other writers such as Edith Wharton and A.M. Klein have also directed the phrase at the rich and idle. There is also a famous movie by this name.

Other uses:

- In the 1963 feature film Lilies of the Field Sidney Poitier's character, Homer Smith, tries to persuade the mother superior to pay him by quoting Luke 10:7, "The laborer is worthy of his hire." Mother Maria Marthe (Lilia Skala, called "Mother Maria"), responds by asking him to read another Bible verse from the Sermon on the Mount: "Consider the lilies of the field, how they grow; they toil not, neither do they spin. And yet I say unto you that even Solomon in all his glory was not arrayed like one of these.”
- In "The Trouble with Tribbles", the 44th episode of the American science fiction television series Star Trek (episode first aired December 29, 1967), Mr. Spock, referring to the tribbles, which were small furry un-sentient creatures that did nothing but eat and procreate, says "They remind me of the lilies of the field. They toil not, neither do they spin. But they seem to eat a great deal. I see no practical use for them."
- In Ray Bradbury's Fahrenheit 451, Guy Montag attempted to memorize this verse while on a subway. He was unsuccessful due to the loud advertisements for Denham's Dentifrice.
- In a season 4 episode of The Rockford Files a wealthy heiress chides Rockford for his attitude towards her by saying, "I toil not and neither do I spin and that just bugs the hell out of you, doesn't it?"
- In Monty Python's satirical take on religious teachings, meanings and misunderstandings, Life of Brian's main character (portrayed by Graham Chapman) tries to give an impassioned impromptu sermon to a sceptical, heckling crowd who take the allegorical "Consider the lilies-" line literally, and take him to task for it.
- The song "I Have Considered the Lilies" by singer-songwriter Connie Converse takes direction from this verse. She introduces it by saying, "This has a biblical text," and the lyrics expound upon her admiration for the lily lifestyle.

== Commentary from the Church Fathers ==
Chrysostom: Having shown that it is not right to be anxious about food, He passes to that which is less; (for raiment is not so necessary as food;) and asks, And why are ye careful wherewith ye shall be clothed? He uses not here the instance of the birds, when He might have drawn some to the point, as the peacock, or the swan, but brings forward the lilies, saying, Consider the lilies of the field. He would prove in two things the abundant goodness of God; to wit, the richness of the beauty with which they are clothed, and the mean value of the things so clothed with it.

Augustine: The things instanced are not to be allegorized so that we enquire what is denoted by the birds of the air, or the lilies of the field; they are only examples to prove God's care for the greater from His care for the less.

Pseudo-Chrysostom: For lilies within a fixed time are formed into branches, clothed in whiteness, and endowed with sweet odour, God conveying by an unseen operation, what the earth had not given to the root. But in all the same perfectness is observed, that they may not be thought to have been formed by chance, but may be known to be ordered by God's providence. When He says, They toil not, He speaks for the comfort of men; Neither do they spin, for the women.

Chrysostom: He forbids not labour but carefulness, both here and above when He spoke of sowing.

Glossa Ordinaria: And for the greater exaltation of God's providence in those things that are beyond human industry, He adds, I say unto you, that Solomon in all his glory was not arrayed like one of these.

Jerome: For, in sooth, what regal purple, what silk, what web of diverse colours from the loom, may vie with flowers? What work of man has the red blush of the rose? the pure white of the lily? How the Tyrian dye yields to the violet, sight alone and not words can express.

Preceded by Matthew 6:27	Gospel of Matthew; Chapter 6	Succeeded by Matthew 6:29
