= Matthew 6:22 =

- ← 6:21 6:23 →
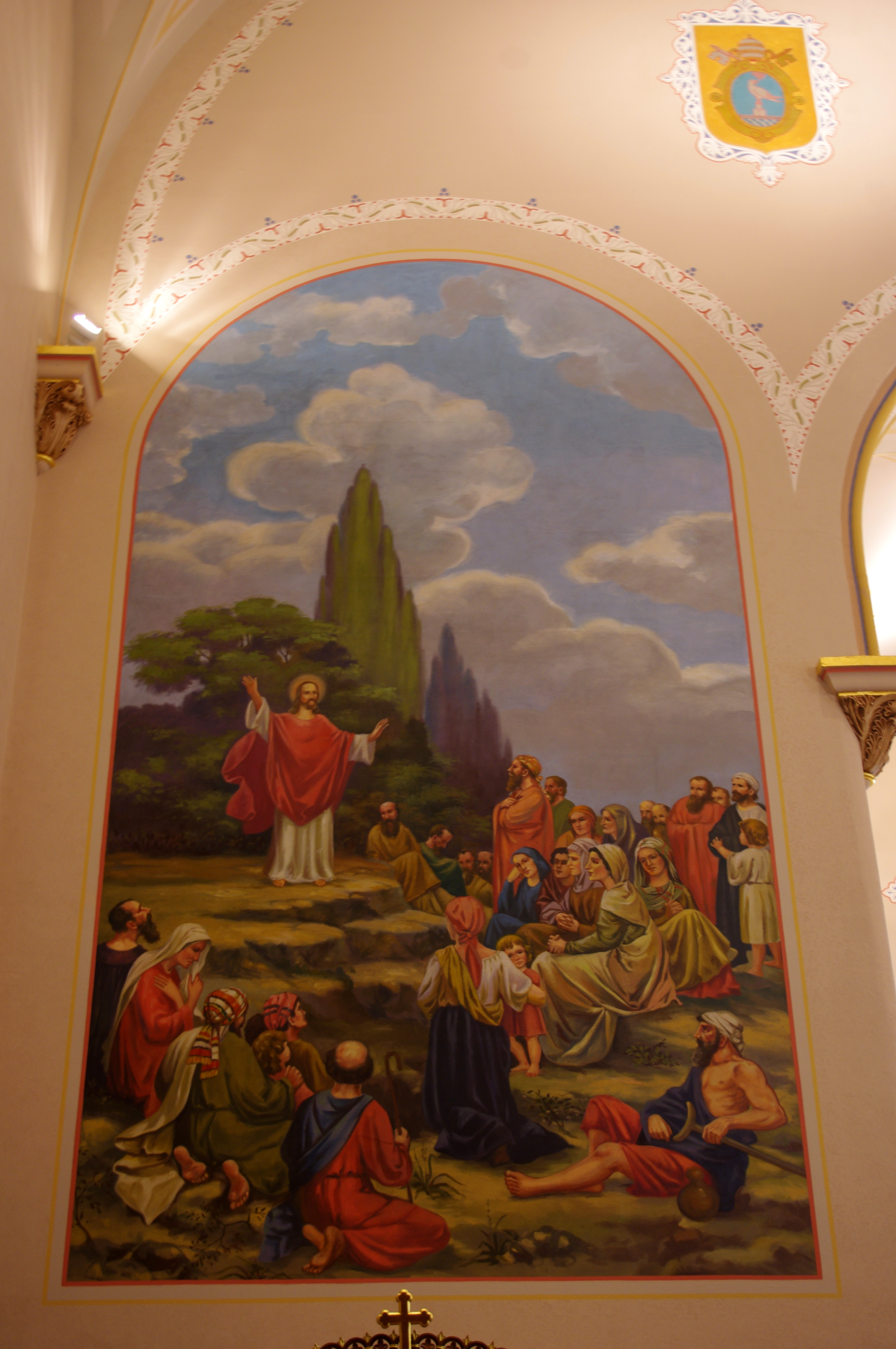
- "The Sermon on the Mount". Immaculate Conception Catholic Church (Celina, Ohio) - interior, mural.
- Book: Gospel of Matthew
- Christian Bible part: New Testament

Matthew 6:22 is the twenty-second verse of the sixth chapter of the Gospel of Matthew in the New Testament, and is part of the Sermon on the Mount.

== Content ==
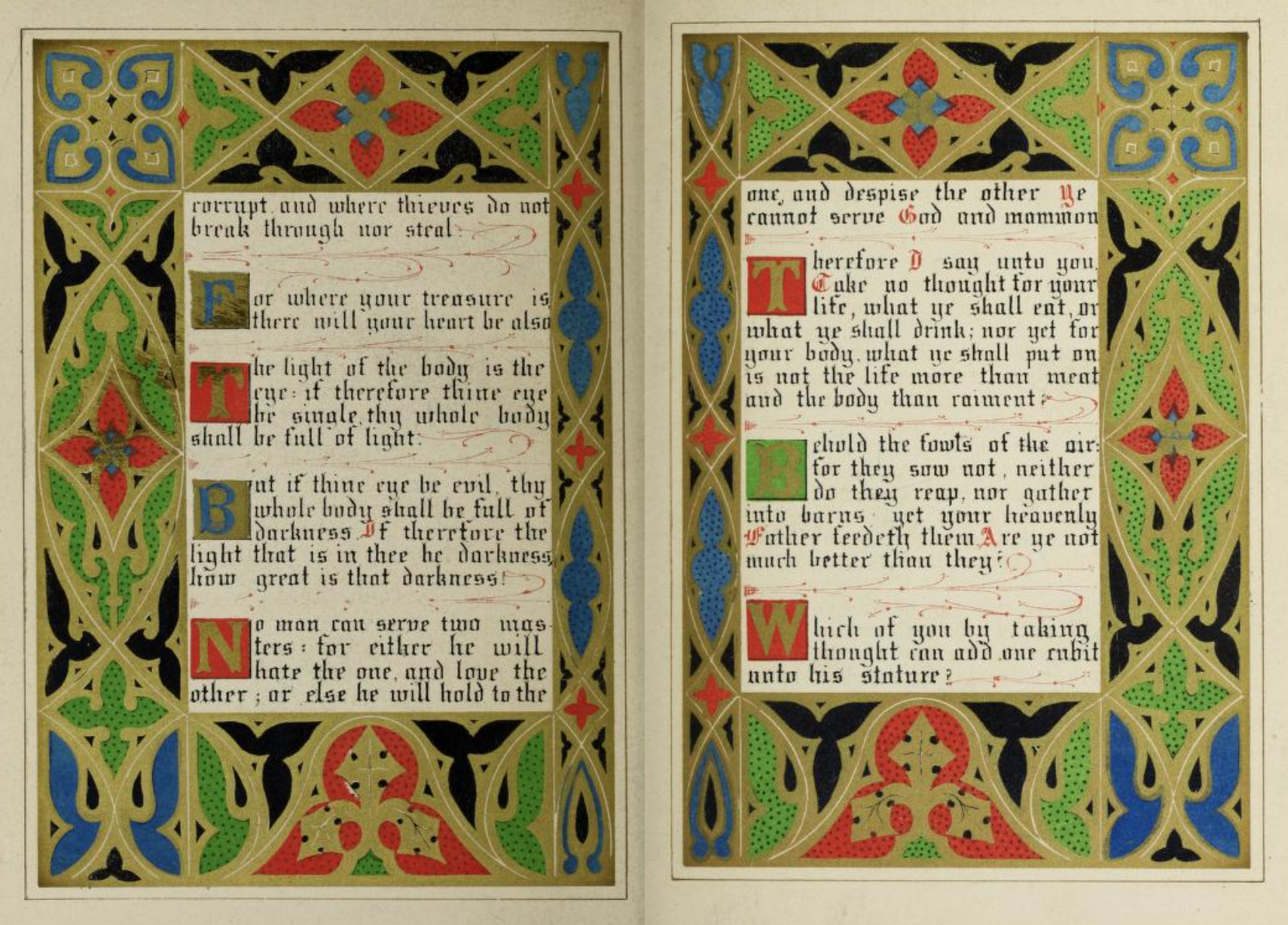
Matthew 6:21–27 from the 1845 illuminated book of The Sermon on the Mount, designed by Owen Jones.

In the King James Version of the English Bible the text reads:

The light of the body is the eye:
if therefore thine eye be single,
thy whole body shall be full of light.

The World English Bible translates the passage as:

The lamp of the body is the eye.
If therefore your eye is sound, your
whole body will be full of light.

The Novum Testamentum Graece text is:

Ὁ λύχνος τοῦ σώματός ἐστιν ὁ ὀφθαλμός
ἐὰν οὖν ᾖ ὁ ὀφθαλμός σου ἁπλοῦς,
ὅλον τὸ σῶμά σου φωτεινὸν ἔσται

For a collection of other versions see Matthew 6:22 in the Bible gateway.

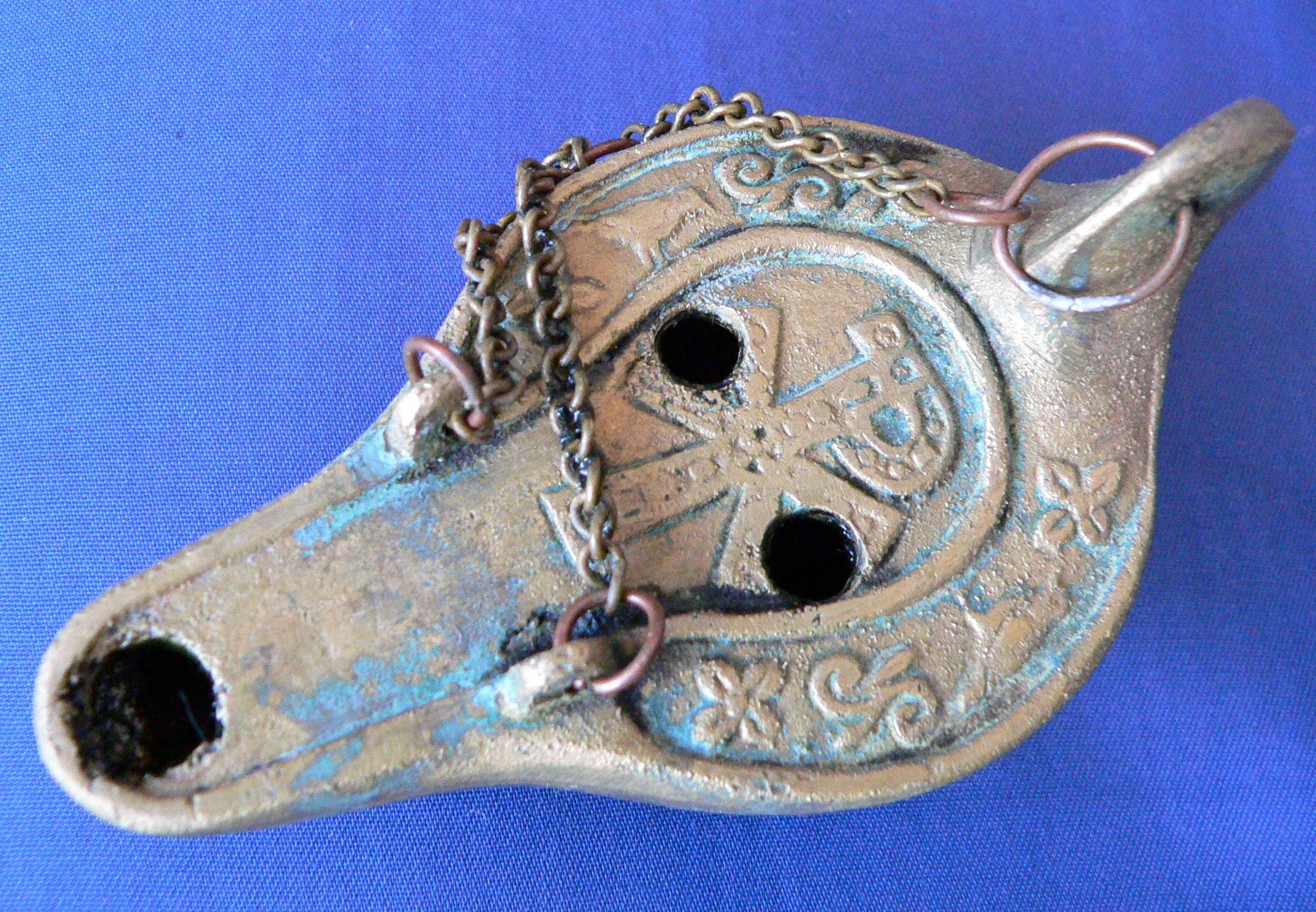
Antique bronze oil lamp with the "Chi Rho", a Christian symbol (replica)

== Translation ==
The Greek: λυχνος, lychnos, is generally translated as "lamp", but in the King James Version, the Geneva Bible and Calvin's Commentary it was translated as "light".

== Interpretation ==
By lamp, this verse may mean that the eye is a metaphorical window by which light enters the body. Alternatively the lamp might not be meant as a source of light, but rather as a guide through darkness, just as the eye is a guide through life. In this case the verse is almost certainly speaking of a spiritual eye rather than the literal organ. Harold Fowler suggests that in this verse eye is a metaphor for the conscience and moral vision of the individual, both of which serve as guiding lights.

What is meant by the word ἁπλοῡς, haplous, translated as single in the KJV and sound in the WEB, is uncertain. This term can mean generous, and its opposite in the next verse clearly means miserly. This verse can thus mean one is "full of light" if one's eye, i.e. conscience, is generous. This wording links this verse to the idea of the evil eye, which was often termed the "ungenerous eye". By this interpretation the good spiritual eye is one that is generous and can perceive God, and thus allows illumination into the entire body. However, in the Septuagint, haplous is used to translate the Hebrew term for Singleness of heart or "singleness of purpose". If the author of Matthew was using this translation this verse would be extolling the eye that is solely focused on one thing, i.e. God. This second interpretation as Singleness of heart links closely with the neighbouring sections where Jesus is warning his followers not to deviate from their focus on God by concerning themselves with worldly things. Both Fowler and R. T. France speculate that this ambiguity is deliberate, and that the verse is speaking about both generosity and single mindedness, as both ideas are discussed in this part of Jesus' sermon.

According to David Hill, some scholars believe that the metaphor of being filled with light is a reference to the soul, but he notes that this was not a standard metaphor for the soul in Jewish literature of the period.

== Commentary from the Church Fathers ==
Chrysostom: Having spoken of the bringing the understanding into captivity because it was not easy to be understood of many, He transfers it to a sensible instance, saying, The light of thy body is thy eye. As though He had said, If you do not know what is meant by the loss of the understanding, learn a parable of the bodily members; for what the eye is to the body, that the understanding is to the soul. As by the loss of the eyes we lose much of the use of the other limbs, so when the understanding is corrupted, your life is filled with many evils.

Jerome: This is an illustration drawn from the senses. As the whole body is in darkness, where the eye is not single, so if the soul has lost her original brightness, every sense, or that whole part of the soul to which sensation belongs, will abide in darkness. Wherefore He says, If then the light which is in thee be darkness, how great is that darkness! that is, if the senses which are the soul's light be darkened by vice, in how great darkness do you suppose the darkness itself will be wrapped?

Pseudo-Chrysostom: It seems that He is not here speaking of the bodily eye, or of the outward body that is seen, or He would have said, If thine eye be sound, or weak; but He says, single, and, evil. But if one have a benign yet diseased eye, is his body therefore in light? Or if an evil yet a sound, is his body therefore in darkness?

Jerome: Those who have thick eye-sight see the lights multiplied; but the single and clear eye sees them single and clear.

Chrysostom: Or; The eye He speaks of is not the external but the internal eye. The light is the understanding, through which the soul sees God. He whose heart is turned to God, has an eye full of light; that is, his understanding is pure, not distorted by the influence of worldly lusts. The darkness in us is our bodily senses, which always desire the things that pertain to darkness. Whoso then has a pure eye, that is, a spiritual understanding, preserves his body in light, that is, without sin; for though the flesh desires evil, yet by the might of divine fear the soul resists it. But whoever has an eye, that is, an understanding, either darkened by the influence of the malignant passions, or fouled by evil lusts, possesses his body in darkness; he does not resist the flesh when it lusts after evil things, because he has no hope in Heaven, which hope alone gives us the strength to resist desire.

Hilary of Poitiers: Otherwise; from the office of the light of the eye, He calls it the light of the heart; which if it continue single and brilliant, will confer on the body the brightness of the eternal light, and pour again into the corrupted flesh the splendor of its origin, that is, in the resurrection. But if it be obscured by sin, and evil in will, the bodily nature will yet abide subject to all the evils of the understanding.

Augustine: Otherwise; by the eye here we may understand our purpose; if that be pure and right, all our works which we work according thereto are good. These He here calls the body, as the Apostle speaks of certain works as members; Mortify your members, fornication and uncleanness. (Col. 3:5.) We should look then, not to what a person does, but with what mind he does it. For this is the light within us, because by this we see that we do with good intention what we do. For all which doth make manifest is light. (Eph. 5:13.) But the deeds themselves, which go forth to men's society, have a result to us uncertain, and therefore He calls them darkness; as when I give money to one in need, I know not what he will do with it. If then the purport of your heart, which you can know, is defiled with the lust of temporal things, much more is the act itself, of which the issue is uncertain, defiled. For even though one should reap good of what you do with a purport not good; it will be imputed to you as you did it, not as it resulted to him. If however our works are done with a single purport, that is with the aim of charity, then are they pure and pleasing in God's sight.

Preceded by Matthew 6:21	Gospel of Matthew; Chapter 6	Succeeded by Matthew 6:23
