= Matthew 6:24 =

- ← 6:23 6:25 →
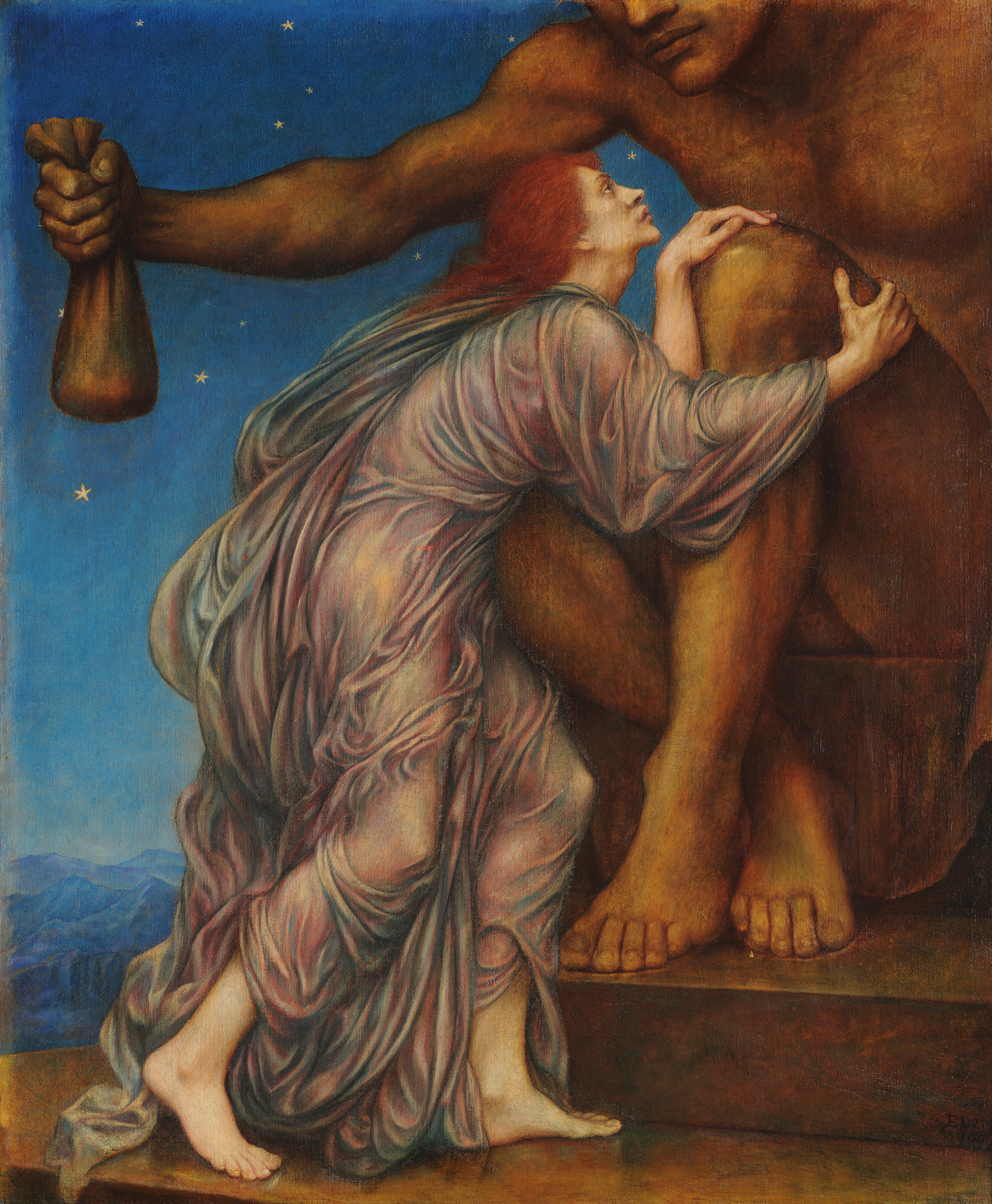
- 1909 painting The Worship of Mammon by Evelyn De Morgan.
- Book: Gospel of Matthew
- Christian Bible part: New Testament

Matthew 6:24 is the twenty-fourth verse of the sixth chapter of the Gospel of Matthew in the New Testament and is part of the Sermon on the Mount.

== Content ==
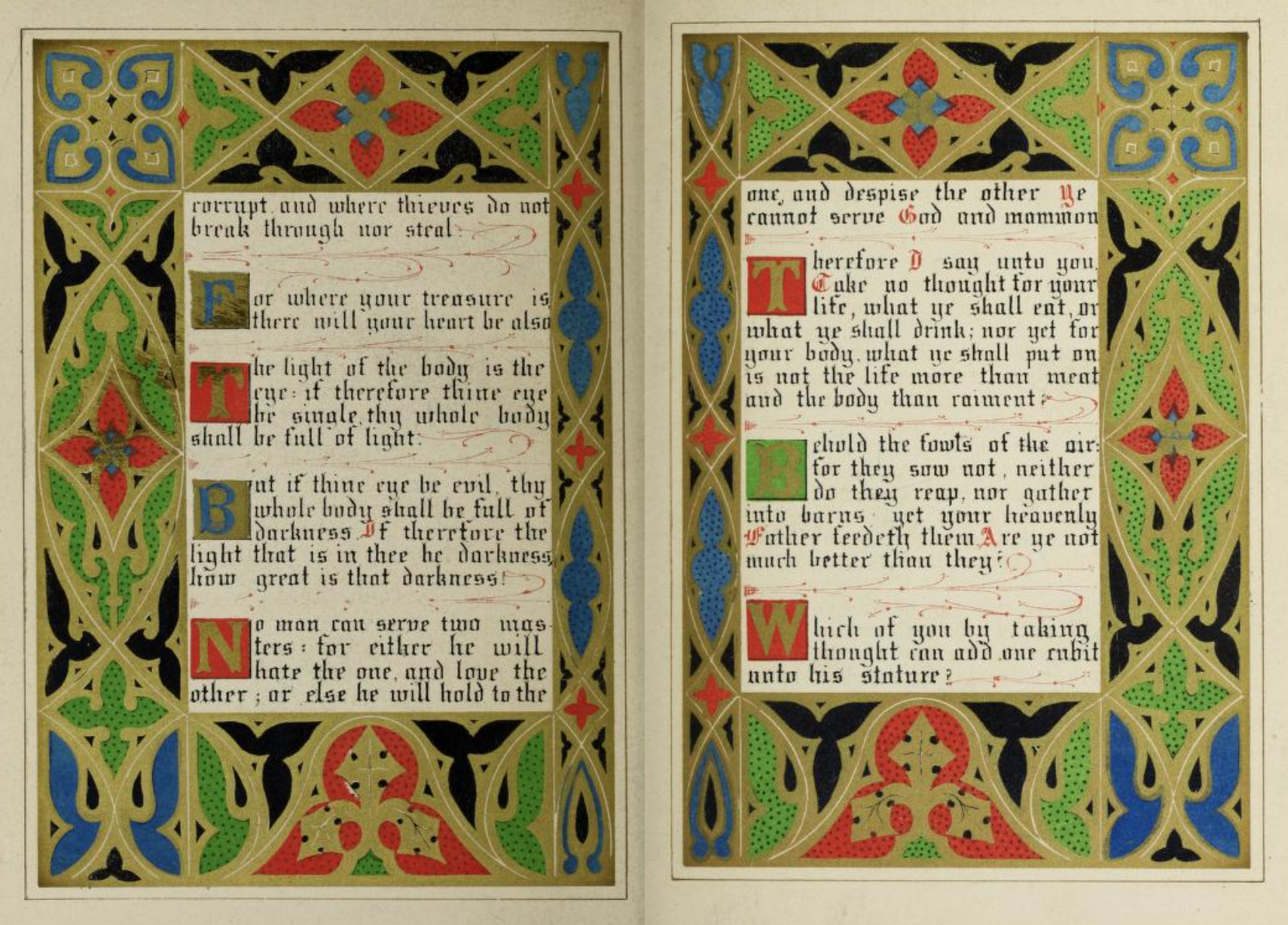
Matthew 6:21–27 from the 1845 illuminated book of The Sermon on the Mount, designed by Owen Jones.

In the King James Version of the Bible the text reads:

No man can serve two masters: for either he
will hate the one, and love the other; or else
he will hold to the one, and despise the other.
Ye cannot serve God and mammon.

The World English Bible translates the passage as:

“No one can serve two masters, for either he
will hate the one and love the other; or else
he will be devoted to one and despise the
other. You can’t serve both God and Mammon.

The Novum Testamentum Graece text is:

Οὐδεὶς δύναται δυσὶ κυρίοις δουλεύειν
ἢ γὰρ τὸν ἕνα μισήσει καὶ τὸν ἕτερον ἀγαπήσει,
ἢ ἑνὸς ἀνθέξεται καὶ τοῦ ἑτέρου καταφρονήσει
οὐ δύνασθε Θεῷ δουλεύειν καὶ μαμωνᾷ.

== Translation and interpretation ==
This famous verse continues the discussion of wealth, and makes explicit what was implied in Matthew 6:21: a person cannot pursue both material goods and spiritual well-being. The two goals are mutually exclusive.

This famous saying also appears at Luke 16:13, but there it comes at the end of the Parable of the Unjust Steward. In Luke's Gospel, the saying is thus clearly one about God and money. In Matthew, the previous verses imply it can mean placing anything above God.

Leon Morris notes that the Greek: δουλεύειν, douleuein, translated as serve, literally means be a slave to, unlike in Luke where the reference is to servants. The Holman Christian Standard Bible translated the phrase as "No one can be a slave of two masters". David Hill notes that while labourers would frequently have more than one employer, it was impossible for a slave to have two masters and the author of Matthew may have chosen the slave metaphor as the clearer one. However, Morris notes that Acts 16:16 mentions a slave with more than one master. What Jesus is noting is not a legal impossibility, but a psychological one. While the slave might at first believe he can serve both masters equally eventually he will come to prefer one over the other. The slavery metaphor also can mitigate Jesus' warning. One cannot be a slave to both God and money, but it does not mean that one cannot be both a slave to God and also pursue a reasonable interest in money. This verse is not a call for the renunciation of all wealth, merely a warning against the idolization of the pursuit of money.

The word translated as "love" is Greek: αγαπησει agapēsei.

The word mammon was a standard one for money or possessions, and in the literature of the period it is generally not a pejorative term. Frequently Jews were called upon to honour God with their mammon, by making donations. Some other texts, such as 1 Enoch, do use the pursuit of mammon as a negative contrast to the pursuit of holiness. Traditionally it was believed that Mammon was the name of a pagan god who was synonymous with greed, but there is no evidence that a god by this name was ever worshipped and it is uncertain how this word entered the lexicon. Despite this the word is still frequently left untranslated as though it were a personal name. The character of Mammon also appears in the works of Milton.

Matthew 6:24 also parallels part of Saying 47 of the noncanonical Gospel of Thomas.

Thomas Aquinas has a homily on this verse, in which he states: "The Lord Jesus Christ shows in these words that God alone is to be served, and that no one is to be obeyed in opposition to God, and that no one is to be hindered from serving God, 'Thou shalt worship the Lord thy God, and Him only shalt thou serve,' Matt. 4:10." He then goes on to state fives reasons why we ought to serve God: 1) On the ground of congruity; for all things serve Him, whence it is sufficiently congruous that man also should serve. 2) He alone has in us the right of possession of us. 3) On account of the dignity of serving Him. 4) On account of the necessity of so doing. 5) For the sake of our advantage; for many profitable things flow to man from the service of God.

== Commentary from the Church Fathers ==
Pseudo-Chrysostom: The Lord had said above, that he that has a spiritual mind is able to keep his body free from sin; and that he who has not, is not able. Of this He here gives the reason, saying, No man can serve two masters.

Glossa Ordinaria: Otherwise; it had been declared above, that good things become evil, when done with a worldly purpose. It might therefore have been said by someone, I will do good works from worldly and heavenly motives at once. Against this the Lord says, No man can serve two masters.

Chrysostom: Or otherwise; in what had gone before He had restrained the tyranny of avarice by many and weighty motives, but He now adds yet more. Riches do not only harm us in that they arm robbers against us, and that they cloud our understanding, but they moreover turn us away from God's service. This He proves from familiar notions, saying, No man can serve two masters; two, He means, whose orders are contrary; for concord makes one of many. This is proved by what follows, for either he will hate the one. He mentions two, that we may see that change for the better is easy. For if one were to give himself up in despair as having been made a slave to riches, namely, by loving them, he may hence learn, that it is possible for him to change into a better service, namely, by not submitting to such slavery, but by despising it.

Glossa Ordinaria: Or; He seems to allude to two different kinds of servants; one kind who serve freely for love, another who serve servilely from fear. If then one serve two masters of contrary character from love, it must be that he hate the one; if from fear, while he trembles before the one, he must despise the other. But as the world or God predominate in a man's heart, he must be drawn contrary ways; for God draws him who serves Him to things above; the earth draws to things beneath; therefore He concludes, Ye cannot serve God and mammon.

Jerome: Mammon—riches are so termed in Syriac. Let the covetous man who is called by the Christian name, hear this, that he cannot serve both Christ and riches. Yet He said not, he who has riches, but, he who is the servant of riches. For he who is the slave of money, guards his money as a slave; but he who has thrown off the yoke of his slavery, dispenses them as a master.

Glossa Ordinaria: By mammon is meant the Devil, who is the lord of money, not that he can bestow them unless where God wills, but because by means of them he deceives men.

Augustine: Whoso serves mammon, (that is, riches,) verily serves him, who, being for desert of his perversity set over these things of earth, is called by the Lord, The prince of this world. Or otherwise; who the two masters are He shows when He says, Ye cannot serve God and mammon, that is to say, God and the Devil. Either then man will hate the one, and love the other, namely God; or, he will endure the one and despise the other. For he who is mammon's servant endures a hard master; for ensnared by his own lust he has been made subject to the Devil, and loves him not. As one whose passions have connected him with another man's handmaid, suffers a hard slavery, yet loves not him whose handmaid he loves. But He said, will despise, and not will hate, the other, for none can with a right conscience hate God. But he despises, that is, fears Him not, as being certain of His goodness.

== See also ==
- Mammon

Preceded by Matthew 6:23	Gospel of Matthew; Chapter 6	Succeeded by Matthew 6:25
