= Matthew 6:29 =

- ← 6:28 6:30 →
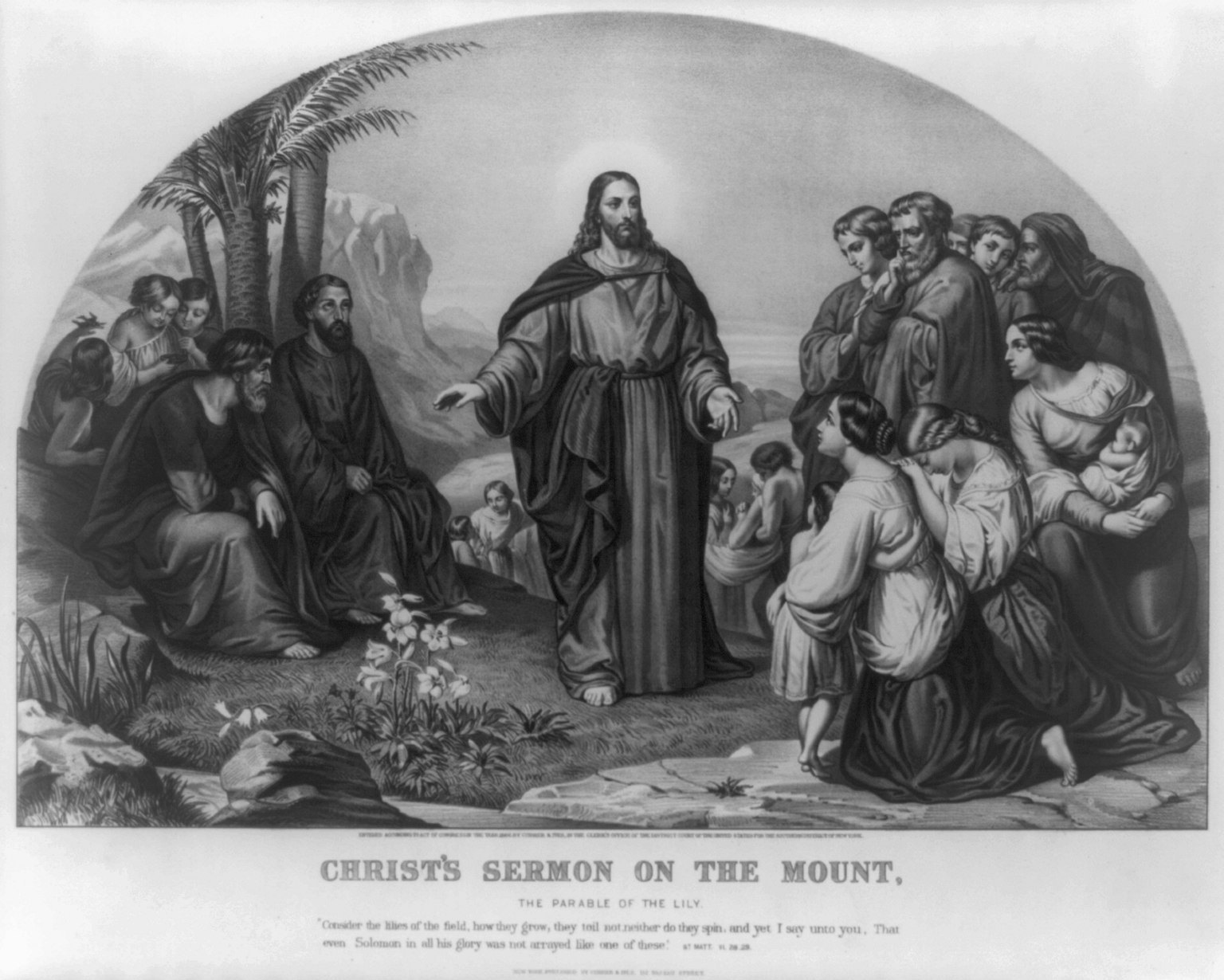
- Christ's sermon on the mount: The parable of the lily. Lithograph. 1866
- Book: Gospel of Matthew
- Christian Bible part: New Testament

Matthew 6:29 is the twenty-ninth verse of the sixth chapter of the Gospel of Matthew in the New Testament and is part of the Sermon on the Mount. This verse continues the discussion of worry about material provisions.

== Content ==
In the King James Version of the Bible the text reads:

And yet I say unto you, That even Solomon in
all his glory was not arrayed like one of these.

The World English Bible translates the passage as:

yet I tell you that even Solomon in all
his glory was not dressed like one of these.

The Novum Testamentum Graece text is:

λέγω δὲ ὑμῖν ὅτι οὐδὲ Σολομὼν ἐν πάσῃ
τῇ δόξῃ αὐτοῦ περιεβάλετο ὡς ἓν τούτων.

For a collection of other versions see BibleHub Matthew 6:29

== Analysis ==
In the previous verse Jesus pointed out that the "lilies of the field" do not labour or produce clothing. In this verse he states that despite this the flowers are as finely dressed as the Jewish king Solomon. In the Old Testament Solomon is presented in passages such as 1 Kings 10 as by far the wealthiest king of Israel. The Hebrew Bible nowhere specifically mentions his clothing, though it would be assumed to be fine. The word translated as arrayed/dressed specifically refers to being dressed in ornate clothing.

Fowler feels that this comparison works on two levels. Firstly the reference to Solomon shows how the pursuit of fine clothes is pointless as one could never match the splendour of that great king. Secondly it makes such efforts even more ridiculous as both are still less splendid than the simple wildflowers of the field. Carter suggests that this verse is portraying Solomon negatively, as one of the insecure strivers unsure of God's will. France disagrees with this, arguing that it is a modern interpretation of Solomon and in this era he was viewed as a figure of unmitigated good.

== Commentary from the Church Fathers ==
Chrysostom: As widely as truth differs from falsehood, so widely do our clothes differ from flowers. If then Solomon, who was more eminent than all other kings, was yet surpassed by flowers, how shall you exceed the beauty of flowers by your garments? And Solomon was exceeded by the flowers not once only, or twice, but throughout his whole reign; and this is that He says, In all his glory; for no one day was he arrayed as are the flowers.

Pseudo-Chrysostom: Or the meaning may be, that Solomon though he toiled not for his own raiment, yet he gave command for the making of it. But where command is, there is often found both offence of them that minister, and wrath of him that commands. When then any are without these things, then they are arrayed as are the lilies.

Hilary of Poitiers: Or; By the lilies are to be understood the eminences of the heavenly Angels, to whom a surpassing radiance of whiteness is communicated by God. They toil not, neither do they spin, because the angelic powers received in the very first allotment of their existence such a nature, that as they were made so they should ever continue to be; and when in the resurrection men shall be like unto Angels, He would have them look for a covering of angelic glory by this example of angelic excellence.

Pseudo-Chrysostom: If God then thus provides for the flowers of the earth which only spring up, that they may be seen and die, shall He overlook men whom He has created not to be seen for a time, but that they should be forever?

Preceded by Matthew 6:28	Gospel of Matthew; Chapter 6	Succeeded by Matthew 6:30
