= Matthew 6:27 =

- ← 6:26 6:28 →
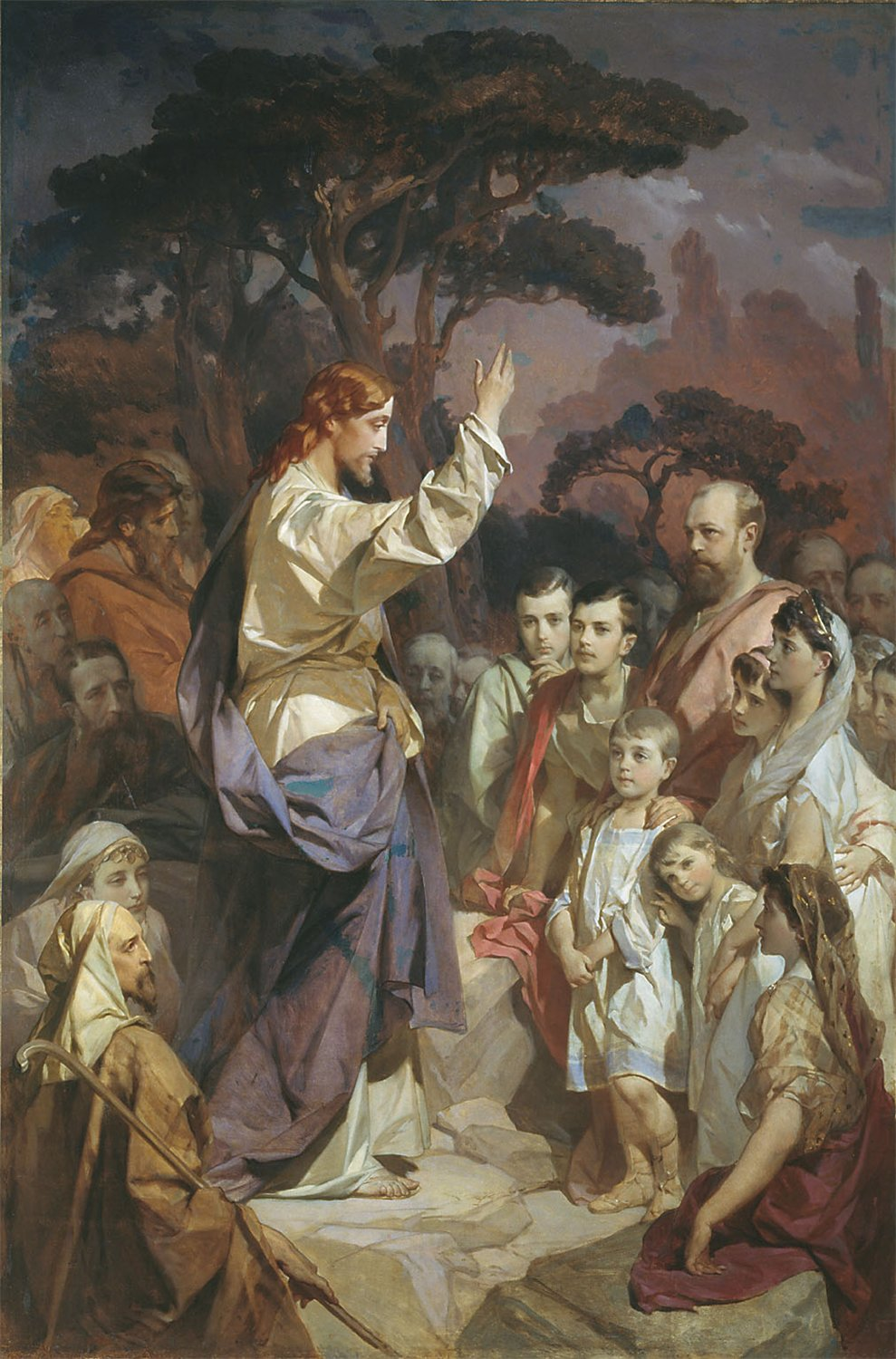
- "Sermon on the Mount" by I. Makarov (1889)
- Book: Gospel of Matthew
- Christian Bible part: New Testament

Matthew 6:27 is the twenty-seventh verse of the sixth chapter of the Gospel of Matthew in the New Testament and is part of the Sermon on the Mount. This verse continues the discussion of worry about material provisions.

== Content ==
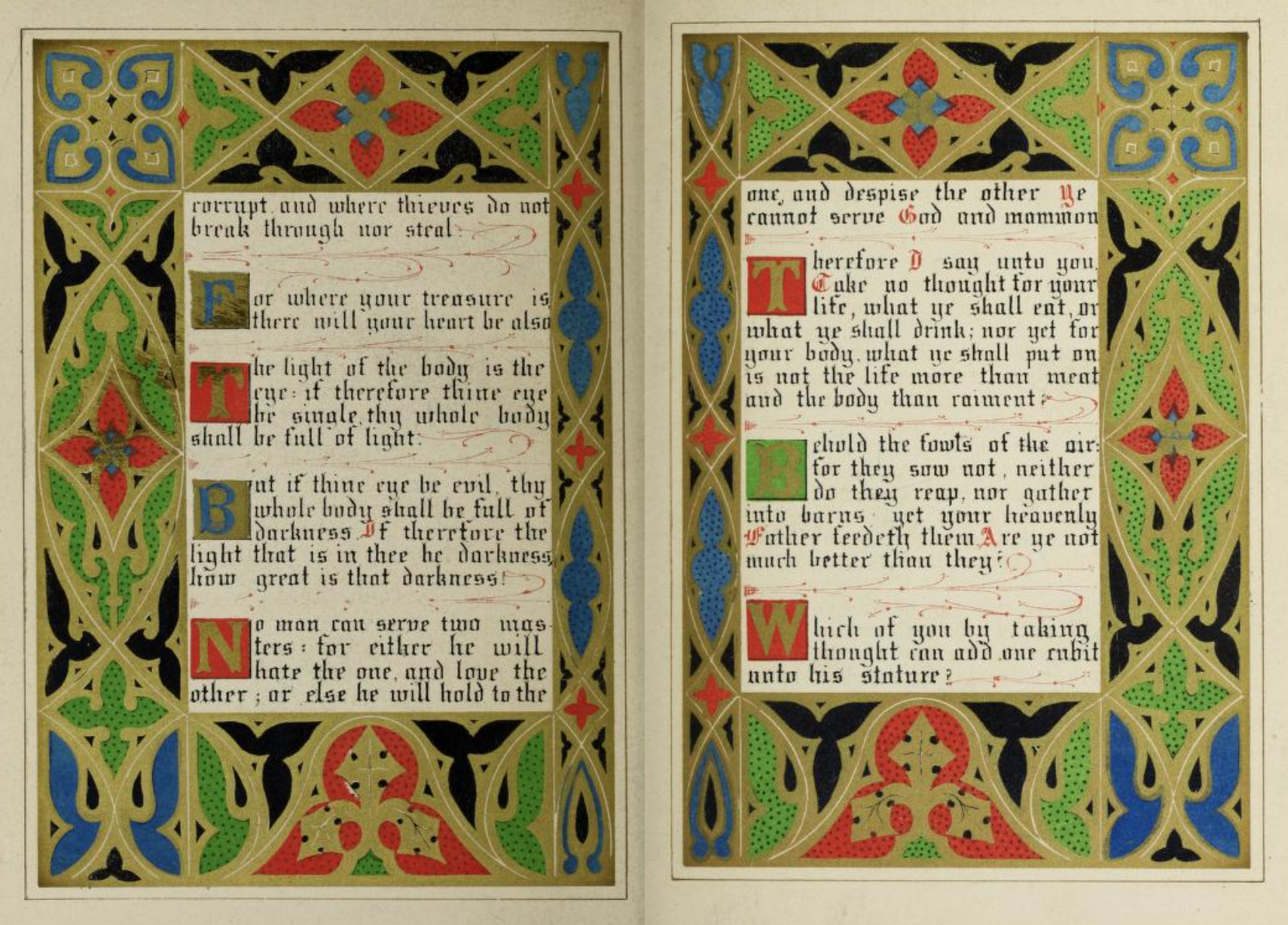
Matthew 6:21–27 from the 1845 illuminated book of The Sermon on the Mount, designed by Owen Jones.

In the King James Version of the Bible the text reads:

Which of you by taking thought can add one cubit unto his stature?

The World English Bible translates the passage as:

“Which of you, by being anxious, can add one moment to his lifespan?

The Novum Testamentum Graece text is:

τίς δὲ ἐξ ὑμῶν μεριμνῶν δύναται προσθεῖναι ἐπὶ τὴν ἡλικίαν αὐτοῦ πῆχυν ἕνα;

For a collection of renderings in other versions, see here: Matthew 6:27

== Analysis ==
In the original Greek, this verse speaks of adding one cubit, a word and a measure of length derived from the forearm. It was usually equivalent to about 46 centimetres or 18 inches. It is odd to increase the lifespan by an amount of length, as a lifespan is measured in time, not distance. There are two methods of resolving this dilemma. The first is to read cubit as a metaphorical term that can stand for any unit of measurement, and this verse is thus speaking of adding time to the life span. Most modern Bible translations, including the WEB, take this approach. The second option, taken by the creators of the KJV, is to argue that the Greek term usually translated as lifespan, helikia, can also sometimes mean stature, and this verse is thus speaking of adding physical height to the body. According to Fowler, Plummer argues against this translation because an increase of height of a cubit would create someone monstrously large, a fate few would desire. Fowler rejects this view, believing that Jesus may be talking about the growth of children rather than adults. Morris feels that we should not rule out the idea that Jesus is here using a humorous exaggeration, as he does elsewhere on occasion. Luz feels that this could be a reference to the then popular idea that Adam before the fall was much taller, and if humans were ever to return to the original state of grace they would regain this height. Beare notes a compromise view, which is that "a cubit of life" could be an expression for the length of time it takes to walk a cubit. Since a cubit is roughly equivalent to a step, Nolland reads this verse as meaning that worry won't help one take a single step towards maturity.

With either translation, the meaning of this verse is the same. Jesus is here telling his followers that there is nothing to gain in life by being worried or anxious. This view on worry is a widely accepted one in the medical community today, and there is even a great deal of evidence that excessive worry can do a great deal to shorten the life span. Schweizer, however, feels that modern technology has somewhat negated this verse as a reasonable concern for one's health can increase one's life span significantly.

== Commentary from the Church Fathers ==
Glossa Ordinaria: He teaches us not only by the instance of the birds, but adds a further proof, that to our being and life our own care is not enough, but Divine Providence therein works; saying, Which of you by taking thought can add one cubit to his stature?

Pseudo-Chrysostom: For it is God who day by day works the growth of your body, yourself not feeling it. If then the Providence of God works thus daily in your very body, how shall that same Providence withhold from working in necessaries of life? And if by taking thought you cannot add the smallest part to your body, how shall you by taking thought be altogether saved?

Augustine: Or it may be connected with what follows it; as though He should say, It was not by our care that our body was brought to its present stature; so that we may know that if we desired to add one cubit to it, we should not be able. Leave then the care of clothing that body to Him who made it to grow to its present stature.

Hilary of Poitiers: Otherwise; As by the example of the spirits He had fixed our faith in the supply of food for our lives, so now by a decision of common understanding He cuts off all anxiety about supply of clothing. Seeing that He it is who shall raise in one perfect man every various kind of body that ever drew breath, and is alone able to add one or two or three cubits to each man's stature; surely in being anxious concerning clothing, that is, concerning the appearance of our bodies, we offer affront to Him who will add so much to each man's stature as shall bring all to an equality.

Augustine: But if Christ rose again with the same stature with which He died, it is impious to say that when the time of the resurrection of all shall come, there shall be added to His body a bigness that it had not at His own resurrection, (for He appeared to His disciples with that body in which He had been known among them,) such that He shall be equalled to the tallest among men. If again we say that all men's bodies, whether tall or short, shall be alike brought to the size and stature of the Lord's body, then much will perish from many bodies, though He has declared that not a hair shall fall. It remains therefore that each be raised in his own stature—that stature which he had in youth, if he died in old age; if in childhood that stature to which he would have attained had he lived. For the Apostle says not, ‘To the measure of the stature,’ but, To the measure of the full age of Christ. (Eph. 4:13.) For the bodies of the dead shall rise in youth and maturity to which we know that Christ attained.

Preceded by Matthew 6:26	Gospel of Matthew; Chapter 6	Succeeded by Matthew 6:28
