= Matthew 6:21 =

- ← 6:20 6:22 →
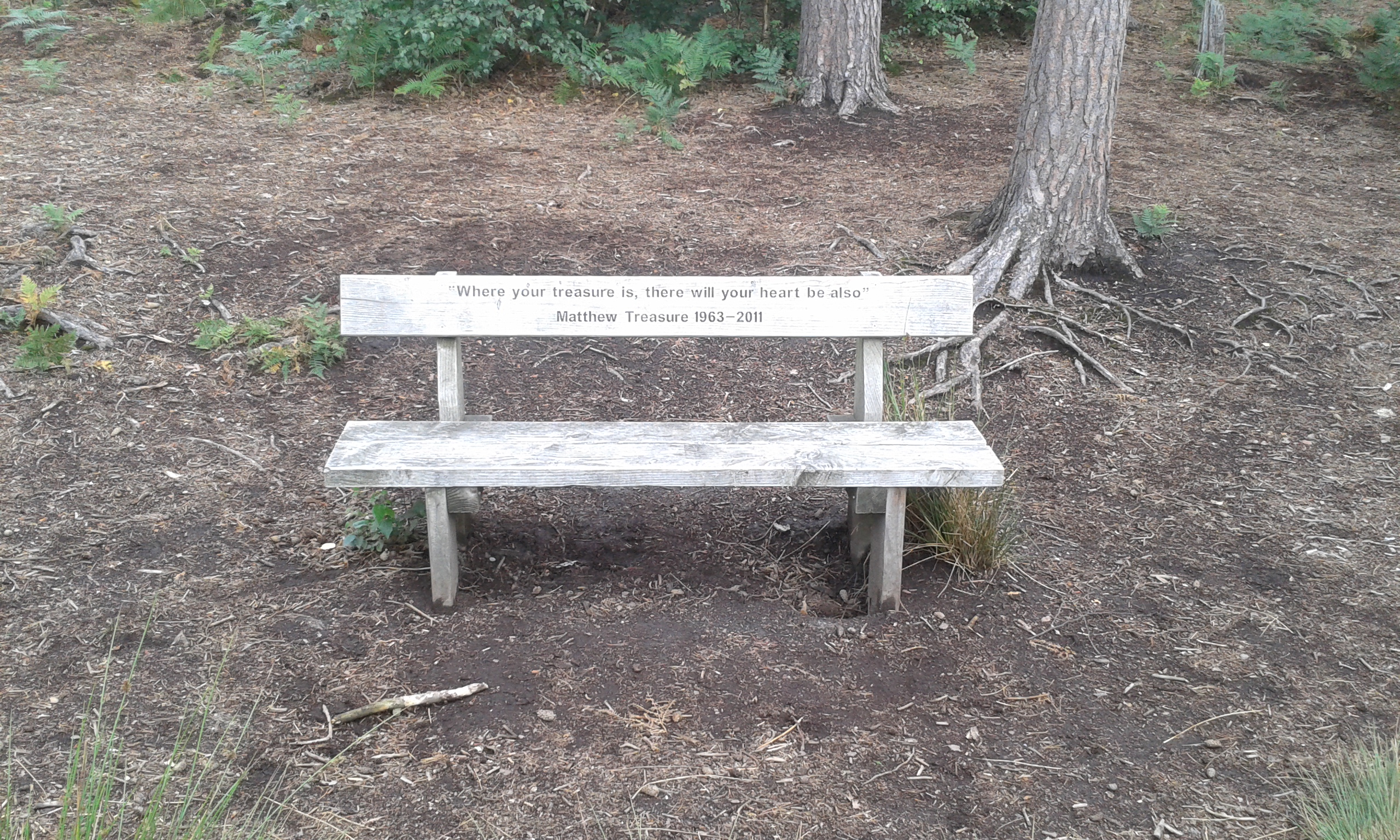
- Text of Matthew 6:21, "Where your treasure is, there will your heart be also", on a bench in Hatchmere, United Kingdom.
- Book: Gospel of Matthew
- Christian Bible part: New Testament

Matthew 6:21 is the twenty-first verse of the sixth chapter of the Gospel of Mathew in the New Testament and is part of the Sermon on the Mount. This verse continues the discussion of wealth.

== Content ==
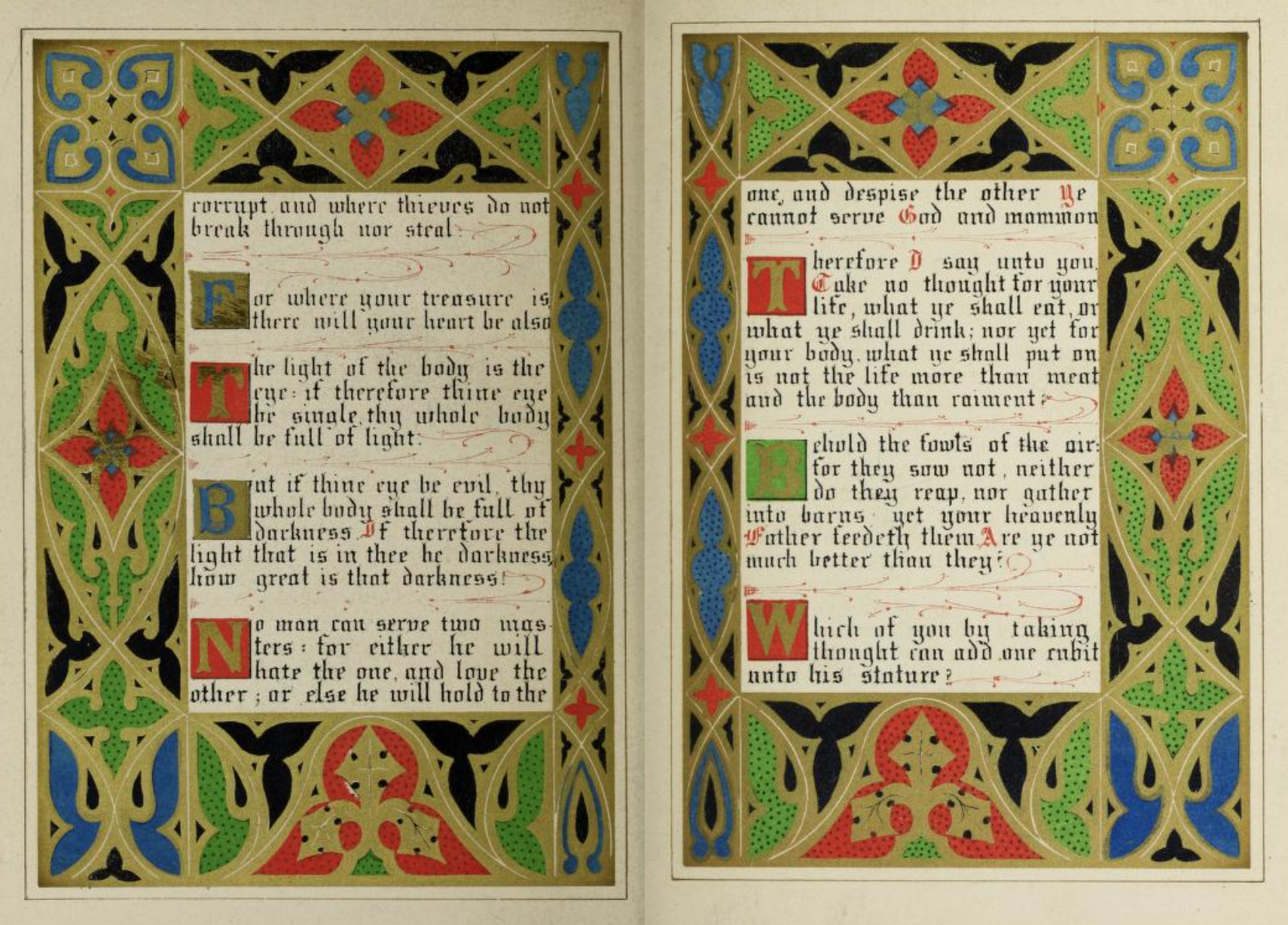
Matthew 6:21–27 from the 1845 illuminated book of The Sermon on the Mount, designed by Owen Jones.

In the King James Version of the Bible the text reads:

For where your treasure is, there will your heart be also.

The World English Bible translates the passage as:

for where your treasure is, there your heart will be also.

The Novum Testamentum Graece text is:

ὅπου γάρ ἐστιν ὁ θησαυρός σου, ἐκεῖ ἔσται καὶ ἡ καρδία σου.

For additional translations see here: Matthew 6:21

== Analysis ==
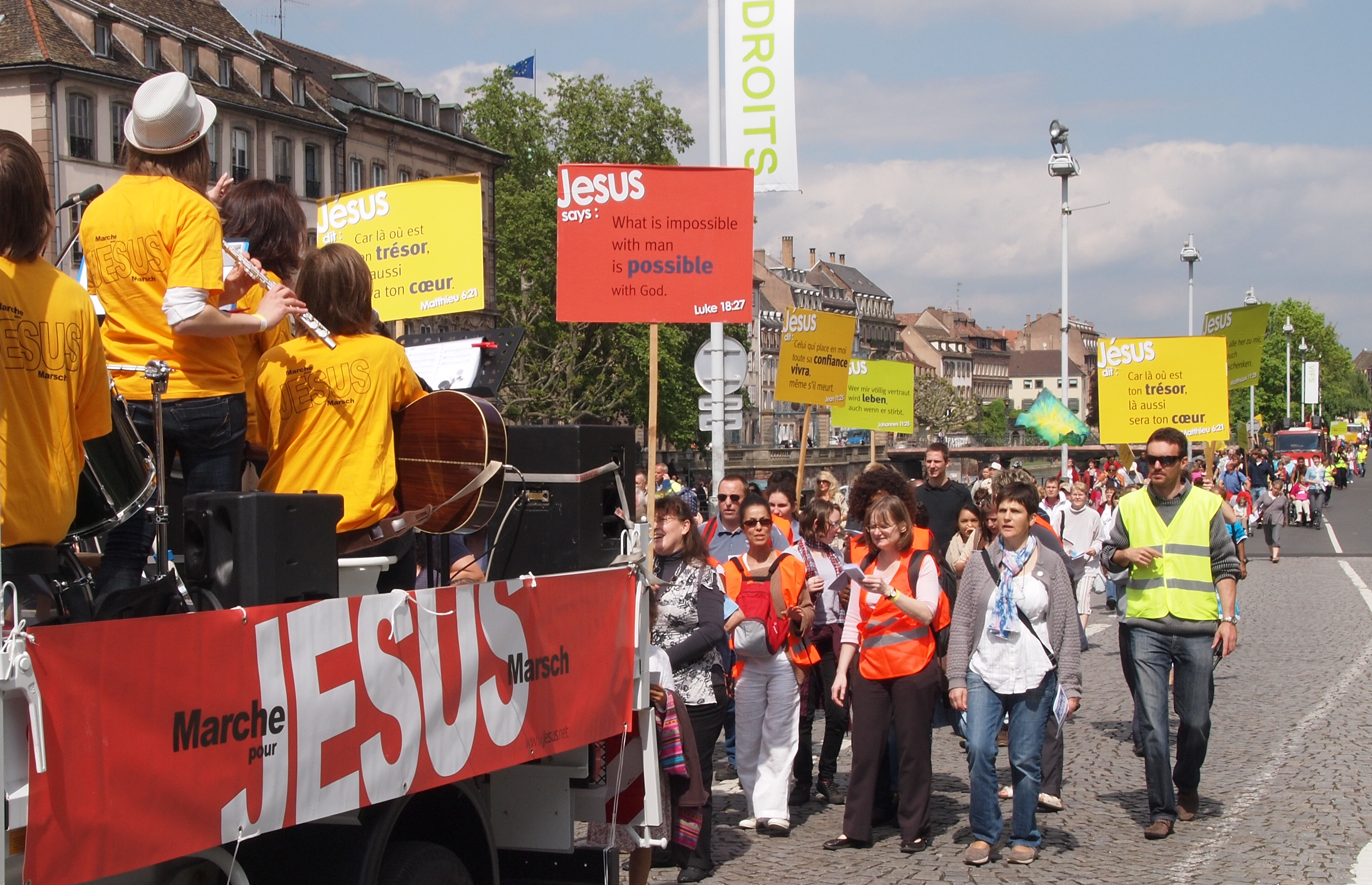
March for Jesus 2012 in Strasbourg, France, showing some banners taken from the French text of Matthew 6:21.

In the previous two verses Jesus explained why one should store one's treasure in heaven rather than on earth. This verse states that if one places one's treasure in heaven that is where one's heart or attention will be. This is an implicit warning, which is made clear later in the chapter, that if one's treasure is on earth, one's heart and attention will also be on earthly matters, to the exclusion of God. While the previous verses stated that placing one's treasures in heaven was wise, this one shifts to warning that not doing so might lead to a life of futility seeking treasures that will not matter in light of eternity. Matthew 6:24 makes this explicit. This verse also makes clear that treasure is not some specific collection of objects, but is rather anything that one values in life.

== Literary uses ==
In the book "Harry Potter and the Deathly Hallows" by J. K. Rowling, it is written that the inscription on the tombstone of Ariana Dumbledore reads "Where your treasure is, there will your heart be also". This is taken from the King James Version of Matthew 6:21 or Luke 12:34, which are identical.

== Commentary from the Church Fathers ==
Pseudo-Chrysostom: Otherwise; He now teaches the benefit of almsgiving. He who places his treasure on earth has nothing to look for in Heaven; for why should he look up to Heaven where he has nothing laid up for himself? Thus he doubly sins; first, because he gathers together things evil; secondly, because he has his heart in earth; and so on the contrary he does right in a twofold manner who lays up his treasure in Heaven.

== Bibliography ==
- Luz, Ulrich. Matthew 1-7: A Commentary. trans. Wilhlem C. Linss. Minneapolis: Augsburg Fortess, 1989.
- Morris, Leon. The Gospel According to Matthew. Grand Rapids: W.B. Eerdmans, 1992.

| Preceded by Matthew 6:20 | Gospel of Matthew; Chapter 6 | Succeeded by Matthew 6:22 |
