= Matthew 6:26 =

- ← 6:25 6:27 →
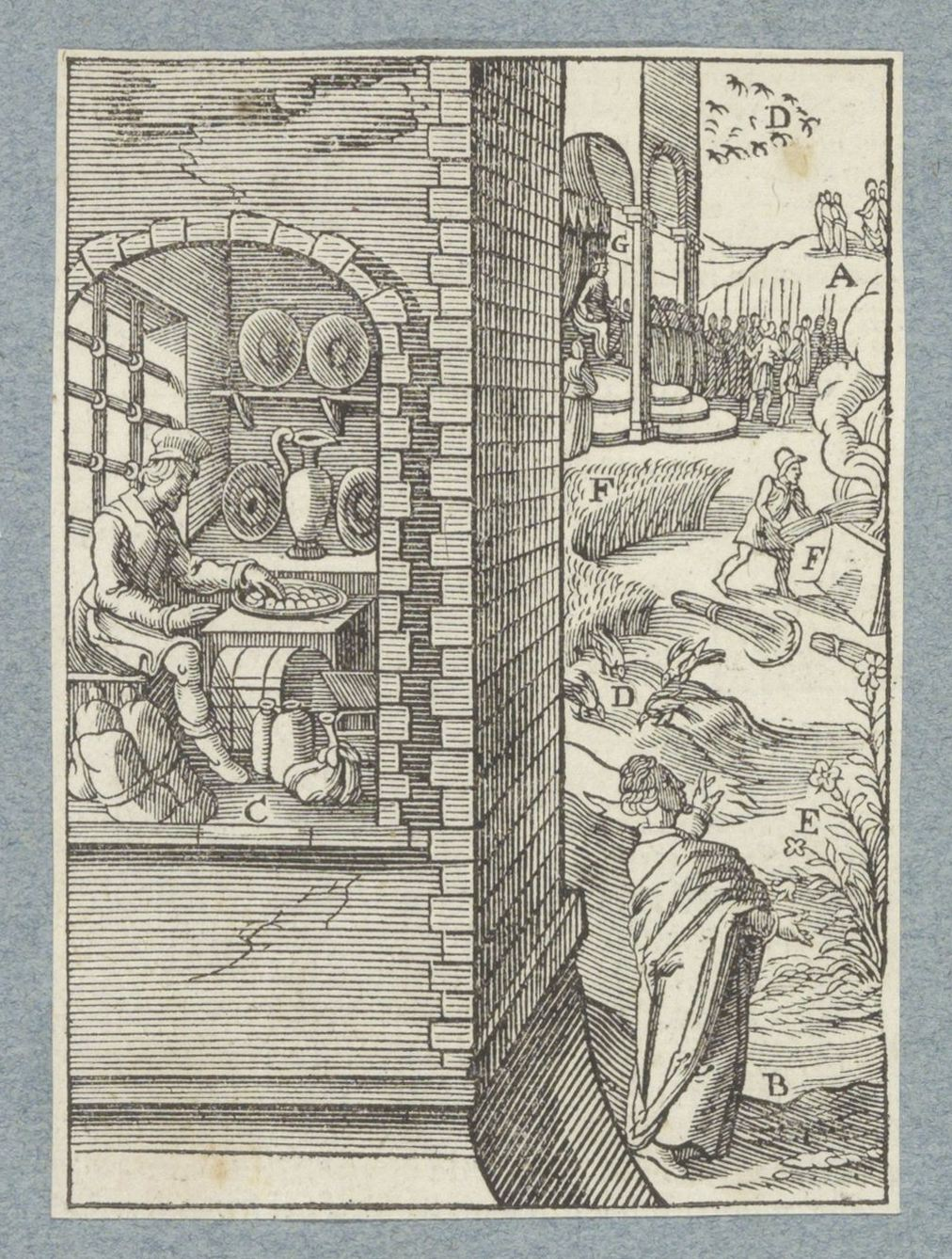
- Illustration of Matthew 6:26: the believer looks at the birds in the sky, that do not reap nor gather into the barns, and trust that the Father will provide. Print by Christoffel van Sichem (1629).
- Book: Gospel of Matthew
- Christian Bible part: New Testament

Matthew 6:26 is the twenty-sixth verse of the sixth chapter of the Gospel of Matthew in the New Testament and is part of the Sermon on the Mount. This verse continues the discussion of worry about material provisions. In this verse Jesus tells his followers not to be anxious about food, but to rely on God as the birds, who are worth far less than people, are fully provided for.

== Content ==
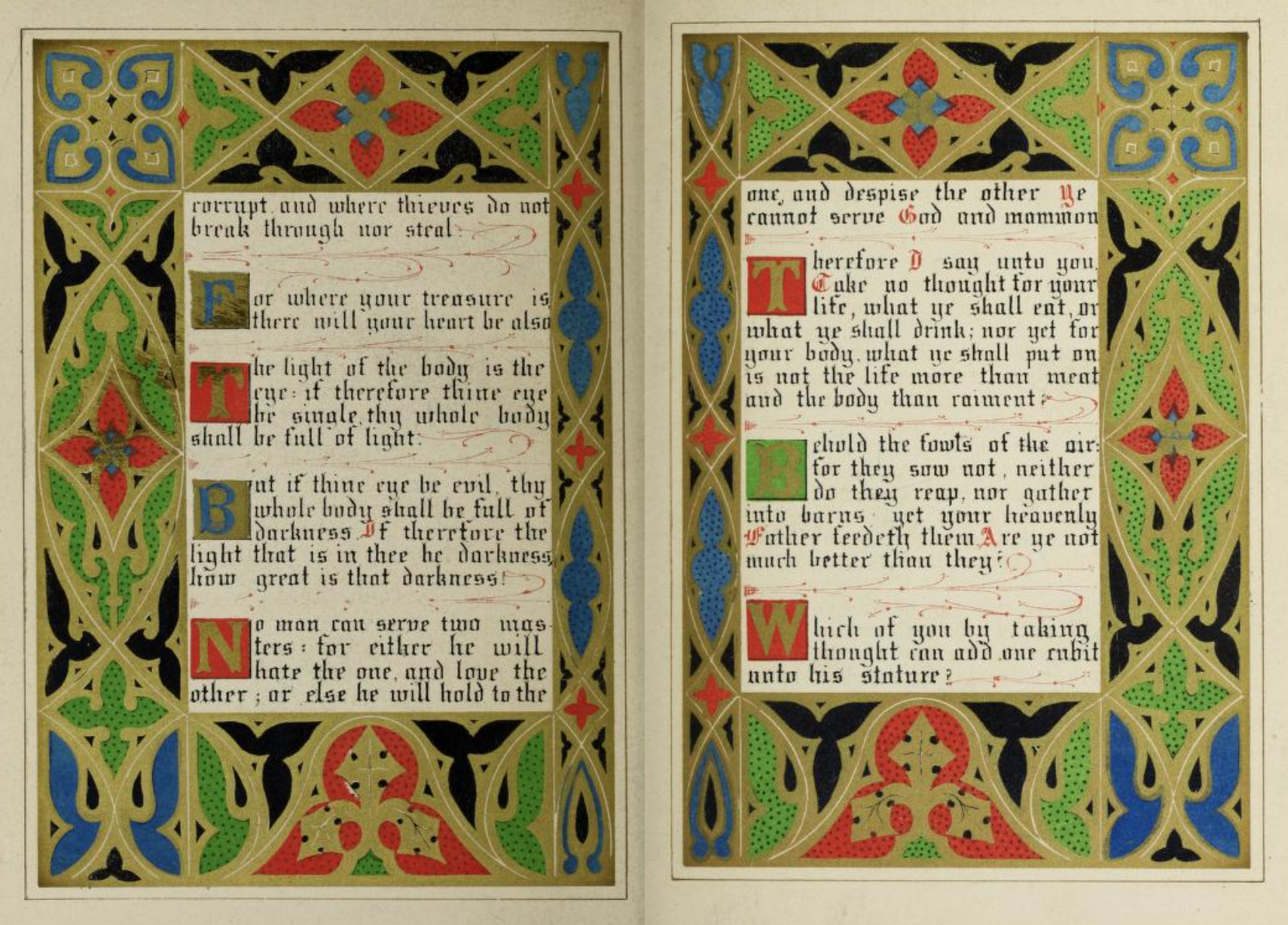
Matthew 6:21–27 from the 1845 illuminated book of The Sermon on the Mount, designed by Owen Jones.

In the King James Version of the Bible the text reads:

Behold the fowls of the air: for they sow not, neither
do they reap, nor gather into barns; yet your heavenly
Father feedeth them. Are ye not much better than they?

The Lord gives goodness to the people, and so the passage teaches to look to the lives of birds as an example for life and sustenance.

The Novum Testamentum Graece text is:

ἐμβλέψατε εἰς τὰ πετεινὰ τοῦ οὐρανοῦ,
ὅτι οὐ σπείρουσιν οὐδὲ θερίζουσιν οὐδὲ συνάγουσιν εἰς ἀποθήκας,
καὶ ὁ Πατὴρ ὑμῶν ὁ οὐράνιος τρέφει αὐτά
οὐχ ὑμεῖς μᾶλλον διαφέρετε αὐτῶν;

For a collection of other versions see BibleHub Matthew 6:26

== Analysis ==
The opening verb in this verse can mean either consider or behold. The second meaning implies that Jesus, speaking in the open air, pointed to some birds nearby while speaking these lines. Birds of the sky literally translates as "birds in heaven," but this was a common expression for birds in flight through the air and does not imply the birds were with God.

There are several debates over this verse. Firstly it can be interpreted as a commandment to idleness, to not farm or work for your food as God will provide for you. This view can be countered by pointing out that birds are far from idle, having to go to a great deal of effort to gather their food. Martin Luther commented on this verse that God provides food, but does not drop it in their beaks.

But as Hendriksen notes, this raises the question that if the birds have to do so much work to get their food, is God really the one providing for them? Hendriksen counters that God provided for them by creating a world filled with food, and giving the birds the instincts to collect it. The verse could also be read as a call for self-sufficiency or for a return to a hunter gatherer lifestyle, something advocated by the philosopher Seneca. Other verses make fairly clear this is not what is meant.

How birds are without worry is also an open question. Fowler argues that it is because they are creatures of instinct. They follow the natural laws laid out by God without choice or deviation. If humans were equally as focused upon following the commands of God without hesitation we too would be without worry and anxiety. Nolland notes that this reference to animals doesn't fully reflect biological reality. There are many creatures that store and save food, and there are also many animals that die from starvation.

This verse quite clearly reflects the anthropocentrism that is found in both the Old and New Testaments. Jewish thought of the period and Christian theology since, have always placed man, who was created in God's image, above the animals and the rest of nature. Fowler argues the superiority of humans to birds in this verse is not so much one of theology, but more one of ability. Humans have the ability to farm, to store food in barns, and to plan for the future. Birds have no such gifts and their lives are ones of hard work for little reward. Despite these greater burdens birds have, they are not anxious about the future.

This verse is paralleled in Luke 12:23, but Luke has ravens instead of birds. Harrington notes that ravens were considered unclean and they might have been removed from Matthew for this reason.

== Commentary from the Church Fathers ==
Pseudo-Chrysostom: Having confirmed our hope by this arguing from the greater to the less, He next confirms it by an argument from less to greater, Behold the fowls of the air, they sow not, neither do they reap...For God created all animals for man, but man for himself; therefore by how much the more precious is the creation of man, so much the greater is God’s care for him. If then the birds without toiling find food, shall man not find, to whom God has given both knowledge of labour and hope of fruitfulness?

Augustine: Ye are of more value, because a rational animal, such as man is, is higher in the scale of nature than an irrational, such as are the birds of the air...Indeed a higher price is often given for a horse than a slave, for a jewel than for a waiting maid, but this not from reasonable valuation, but from the need of the person requiring, or rather from his pleasure desiring it.

Jerome: There be some who, seeking to go beyond the limits of their fathers, and to soar into the air, sink into the deep and are drowned. These will have the birds of the air to mean the Angels, and the other powers in the ministry of God, who without any care of their own are fed by God’s providence. But if this be indeed as they would have it, how follows it, said to men, Are not ye of more worth than they? It must be taken then in the plain sense; If birds that to-day are, and to-morrow are not, be nourished by God’s providence, without thought or toil of their own, how much more men to whom eternity is promised!

Hilary of Poitiers: It may be said, that under the name of birds, He exhorts us by the example of the unclean spirits, to whom, without any trouble of their own in seeking and collecting it, provision of life is given by the power of the Eternal Wisdom. And to lead us to refer this to the unclean spirits, He suitably adds, Are not ye of much more value than they? Thus showing the great interval between piety and wickedness.

Preceded by Matthew 6:25	Gospel of Matthew; Chapter 6	Succeeded by Matthew 6:27
