= Matthew 6:19–20 =

- ← 6:18 6:21 →
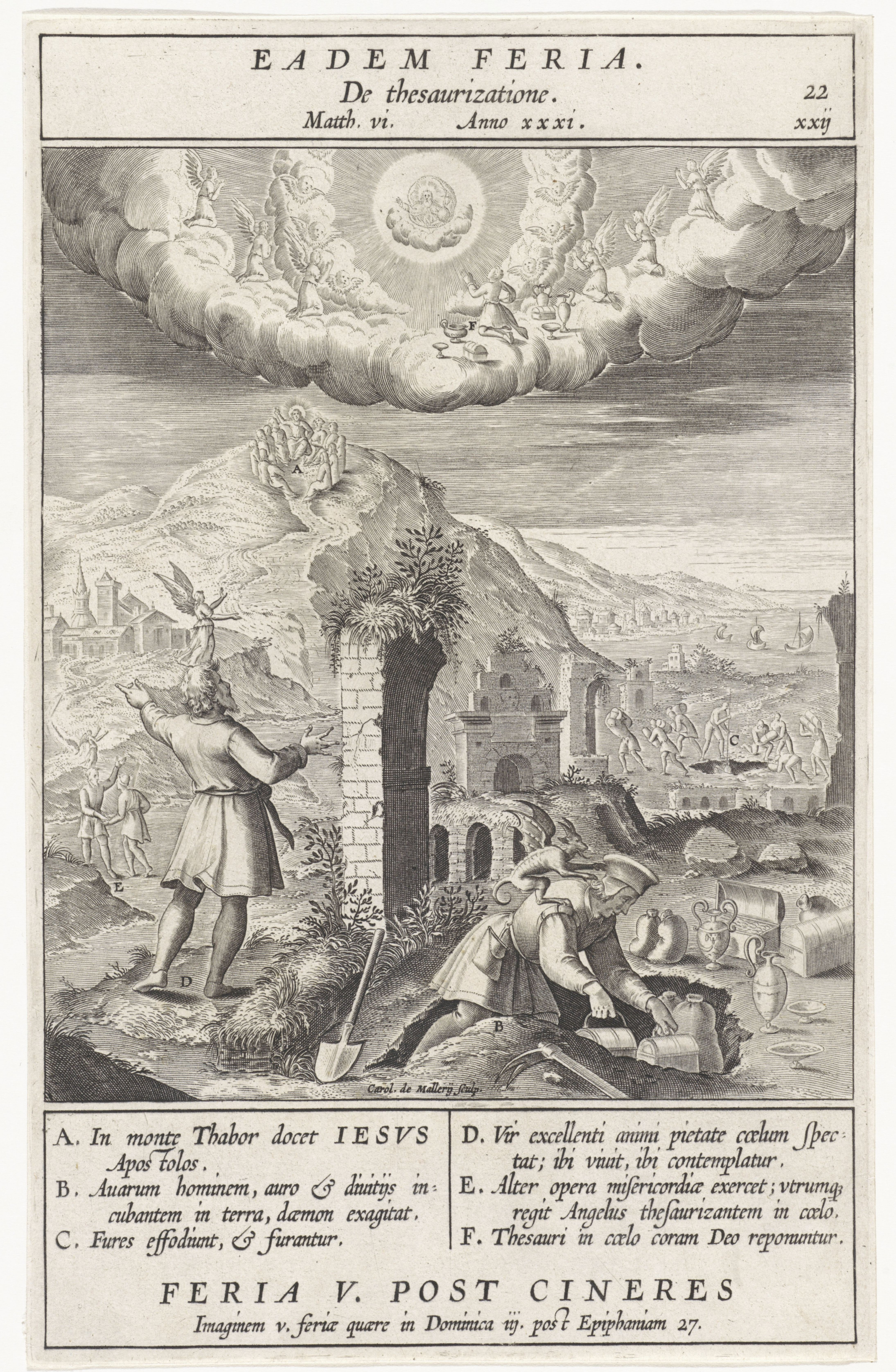
- Illustration of Matthew 6:19 (also Luke 12:21): "do not lay up earthly treasures" by Karel van Mallery (1593).
- Book: Gospel of Matthew
- Christian Bible part: New Testament

Matthew 6:19 and 6:20 are the nineteenth and twentieth verses of the sixth chapter of the Gospel of Matthew in the New Testament and are part of the Sermon on the Mount. These verses open the discussion of wealth. These verses are paralleled in Luke 12:33.

== Content ==
In the King James Version of the Bible the text reads:

19: Lay not up for yourselves treasures upon earth, where moth
and rust doth corrupt, and where thieves break through and steal:
20: But lay up for yourselves treasures in heaven, where neither moth nor
rust doth corrupt, and where thieves do not break through nor steal:

The Novum Testamentum Graece text is:

19: Μὴ θησαυρίζετε ὑμῖν θησαυροὺς ἐπὶ τῆς γῆς,
ὅπου σὴς καὶ βρῶσις ἀφανίζει, καὶ ὅπου κλέπται διορύσσουσιν καὶ κλέπτουσιν
20: θησαυρίζετε δὲ ὑμῖν θησαυροὺς ἐν οὐρανῷ,
ὅπου οὔτε σὴς οὔτε βρῶσις ἀφανίζει, καὶ ὅπου κλέπται οὐ διορύσσουσιν οὐδὲ κλέπτουσιν·

Cross reference: Luke 12:21

== Analysis ==
This passage marks a change in subject matter from the first half of the chapter. While the earlier portion focused on proper procedure for worship, and criticized those who made public display of their piety, this section begins a discussion of wealth and material goods, and why they are not useful. Verses 19–34 form a section devoted to the theme of "possessions".

The use of the word "treasures" could refer to the contents of a treasure box or a store house. Moths are often associated with the destruction of fabrics, and in this era, pieces of clothing were a major investment. What is meant by the Greek, brosis, sometimes translated as "rust", is less certain. The word generally means "eating". This could refer to the oxidization that eats away metals, or it could be referring to vermin, such as the mice that might consume a supply of grain, the worms that eat through wood, or even a reiteration of the aforementioned moths.

The text goes on to say that in contrast to all of the material things that can be destroyed or stolen, investments in Heaven cannot be threatened by others. Thus Jesus suggests that this is the most secure form of investment. This is a very rational and economic argument for piety, somewhat similar to Pascal's Wager. The idea of heaven as a storehouse for spiritual treasures existed before Jesus, being found in several Jewish works of the period and having an analogue in the theory of karma in several Asian religions. It has been noted that the verse may specifically be an encouragement to almsgiving: an argument that one should spend money on alms rather than luxuries. It contains very similar wording to Matthew 19:21, which is specifically on alms.

== Commentary from the Church Fathers ==
Chrysostom: When He has driven away the disease of vanity, He does well to bring in speech of contempt of riches. For there is no greater cause of desire of money than love of praise; for this men desire troops of slaves, horses accoutred in gold, and tables of silver, not for use or pleasure, but that they may be seen of many; therefore He says, Lay not up for yourselves treasure on earth.

Augustine: For if any does a work with the mind of gaining thereby an earthly good, how will his heart be pure while it is thus walking on earth? For anything that is mingled with an inferior nature is polluted therewith, though that inferior be in its kind pure. Thus gold is alloyed when mixed with pure silver; and in like manner our mind is defiled by lust of earthly things, though earth is in its own kind pure.

Pseudo-Chrysostom: Otherwise; As the Lord had above taught nothing concerning alms, or prayer, or fasting, but had only checked a pretence of them, He now proceeds to deliver a doctrine of three portions, according to the division which He had before made, in this order. First, a counsel that alms should be done; second, to show the benefit of almsgiving; third, that the fear of poverty should be no hindrance to our purpose of almsgiving.

Chrysostom: Saying, Lay not up for yourselves treasure on earth, He adds, where rust and moth destroy, in order to show the insecurity of that treasure that is here, and the advantage of that which is in Heaven, both from the place, and from those things which harm. As though He had said; Why fear you that your wealth should be consumed, if you should give alms? Yea rather give alms, and they shall receive increase, for those treasures that are in Heaven shall be added to them, which treasures perish if ye do not give alms. He said not, You leave them to others, for that is pleasant to men.

Rabanus Maurus: Here are three precepts according to the three different kinds of wealth. Metals are destroyed by rust, clothes by moth; but as there are other things which fear neither rust nor moth, as precious stones, He therefore names a common damage, that by thieves, who may rob wealth of all kinds.

Hilary of Poitiers: But the praise of Heaven is eternal, and cannot be carried off by invading thief, nor consumed by the moth and rust of envy.

Augustine: By heaven in this place I understand not the material heavens, for everything that has a body is earthly. But it behoves that the whole world be despised by him who lays up his treasure in that Heaven, of which it is said, The heaven of heavens is the Lord's, (Ps. 115:16.) that is, in the spiritual firmament. For heaven and earth shall pass away; (Mat. 24:35.) but we ought not to place our treasure in that which passes away, but in that which abides for ever.

Pseudo-Chrysostom: Which then is better? To place it on earth where its security is doubtful, or in Heaven where it will be certainly preserved? What folly to leave it in this place whence you must soon depart, and not to send it before you thither, whither you are to go? Therefore, place your substance there where your country is.

Chrysostom: But forasmuch as not every earthly treasure is destroyed by rust or moth, or carried away by thieves, He therefore brings in another motive, For where your treasure is, there will your heart be also. As much as to say; Though none of these former losses should befal you, you will yet sustain no small loss by attaching your affections to things beneath, and becoming a slave to them, and in falling from Heaven, and being unable to think of any lofty thing.

Jerome: This must be understood not of money only, but of all our possessions. The god of a glutton is his belly; of a lover his lust; and so every man serves that to which he is in bondage; and has his heart there where his treasure is.

== Sources ==
- Hill, David. The Gospel of Matthew. Grand Rapids: Eerdmans, 1981
- Morris, Leon. The Gospel According to Matthew. Grand Rapids: W.B. Eerdmans, 1992.

Preceded by Matthew 6:18	Gospel of Matthew; Chapter 6	Succeeded by Matthew 6:21
