= Embolism (disambiguation) =

Embolism may refer to:

- Embolism, when an object (the embolus) migrates from one part of the body (through circulation) and causes a blockage (occlusion) of a blood vessel in another part of the body.
  - Embolization is the passage of an embolus within the bloodstream, either pathologically or therapeutically.
- Embolism in calendars: Intercalation (timekeeping)
- Embolism (liturgy), a liturgical prayer
