= Matthew 6:14–15 =

- ← 6:13 6:16 →
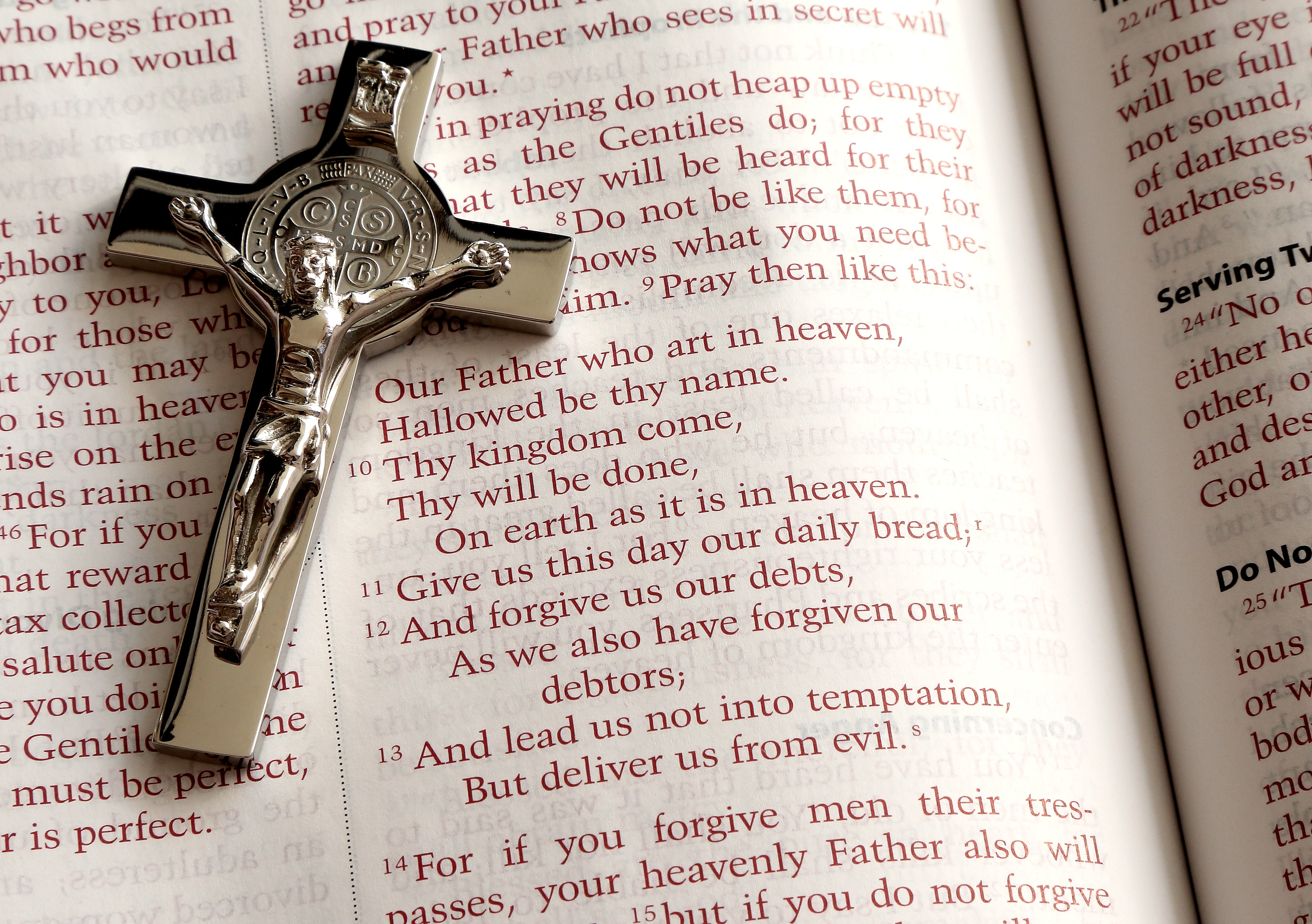
- A crucifix on an open Bible showing Matthew 6 with the Lord's prayer (Matthew 6:9–13).
- Book: Gospel of Matthew
- Christian Bible part: New Testament

Matthew 6:14–15 are the fourteenth and fifteenth verses of the sixth chapter of the Gospel of Matthew in the New Testament and is part of the Sermon on the Mount. These verses come just after the Lord's Prayer and explain one of the statements in that prayer.

== Content ==
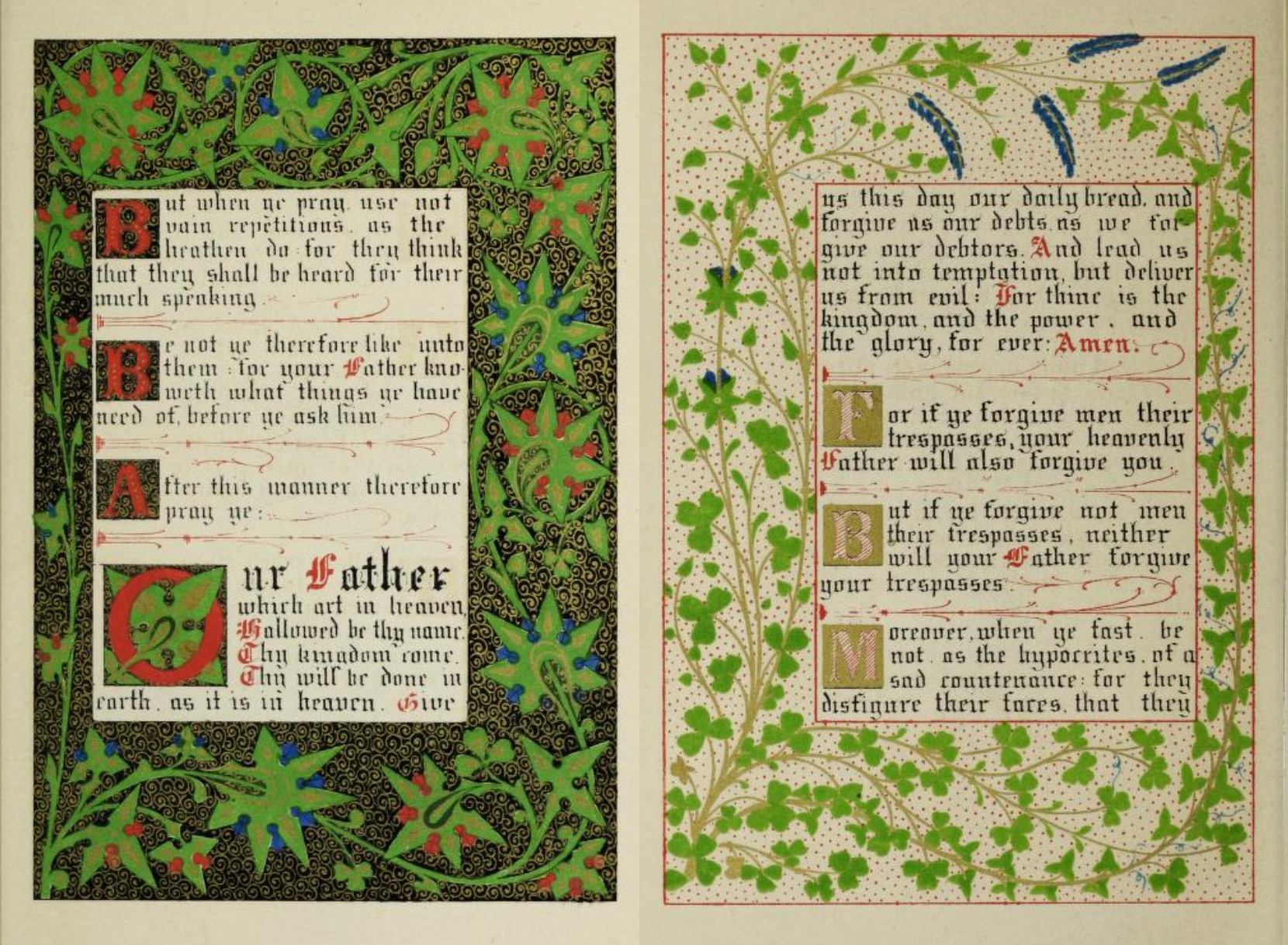
Matthew 6:7–16 from the 1845 illuminated book of The Sermon on the Mount, designed by Owen Jones.

In the New Living Translation it reads:

“If you forgive those who sin against you, your heavenly Father will forgive you. But if you refuse to forgive others, your Father will not forgive your sins."

In the King James Version of the Bible the text reads:

"For if you forgive men their trespasses, your heavenly Father will also forgive you: But if ye forgive not men their
trespasses, neither will your Father forgive your trespasses."

The World English Bible translates the passage as:

"For if you forgive men their trespasses, your heavenly
Father will also forgive you. But if you don't forgive men their
trespasses, neither will your Father forgive your trespasses."

The Novum Testamentum Graece text is:

"ὰν γὰρ ἀφῆτε τοῖς ἀνθρώποις τὰ παραπτώματα αὐτῶν,
ἀφήσει καὶ ὑμῖν ὁ Πατὴρ ὑμῶν ὁ οὐράνιος
ἐὰν δὲ μὴ ἀφῆτε τοῖς ἀνθρώποις, οὐδὲ ὁ Πατὴρ ὑμῶν ἀφήσει τὰ παραπτώματα ὑμῶν."

For a collection of other versions see BibleHub Matthew 6:14-15.

== Analysis ==
The Lord's Prayer is appended by two verses on forgiveness. Allison notes a similar sequence in Mark 11:23–25 and Luke 17:3–6 and proposes a traditional connection between prayer and forgiveness, where prayer is efficacious when members of the community are reconciled to each other.

These verses parallel Matthew 6:12, but while that one speaks of debts this one speaks of trespasses. It states that for a person to earn God's forgiveness they must also be willing to forgive others. Those who do not forgive will not be forgiven by God. It is also similar and becomes clearer in subject matter to the Parable of the Unforgiving Servant found in Matthew (18:21–35). Coogan comments that "reciprocity is vital in the economy of God".

== Commentary from the Church Fathers ==
Rabanus Maurus: By the word Amen, He shows that without doubt the Lord will bestow all things that are rightly asked, and by those that do not fail in observing the annexed condition, For if ye forgive men their sins, your heavenly Father will also forgive you your sins.

Augustine: Here we should not overlook that of all the petitions enjoined by the Lord, He judged that most worthy of further enforcement, which relates to forgiveness of sins, in which He would have us merciful; which is the only means of escaping misery.

Pseudo-Chrysostom: He does not say that God will first forgive us, and that we should after forgive our debtors. For God knows how treacherous the heart of man is, and that though they should have received forgiveness themselves, yet they do not forgive their debtors; therefore He instructs us first to forgive, and we shall be forgiven after.

Augustine: Whoever does not forgive him that in true sorrow seeks forgiveness, let him not suppose that his sins are by any means forgiven of the Lord.

Cyprian: For no excuse will abide you in the day of judgment, when you will be judged by your own sentence, and as you have dealt towards others, will be dealt with yourself.

Jerome: But if that which is written, I said, Ye are gods, but ye shall die like men, (Ps. 83:6, 7.) is said to those who for their sins deserve to become men instead of gods, then they to whom sins are forgiven are rightly called men.

Chrysostom: He mentions heaven and the Father to claim our attention, for nothing so likens you to God, as to forgive him who has injured you. And it were indeed unmeet should the son of such a Father become a slave, and should one who has a heavenly vocation live as of this earth, and of this life only.

== Sources ==
- Allison, Dale C. Jr. (2007). "57. Matthew". In Barton, John; Muddiman, John (eds.). The Oxford Bible Commentary (first (paperback) ed.). Oxford University Press. pp. 844–886. ISBN 978-0199277186.
- Coogan, Michael David (2007). Coogan, Michael David; Brettler, Marc Zvi; Newsom, Carol Ann; Perkins, Pheme (eds.). The New Oxford Annotated Bible with the Apocryphal/Deuterocanonical Books: New Revised Standard Version, Issue 48 (Augmented 3rd ed.). Oxford University Press. ISBN 9780195288810.
- France, R. T. (1994). "Matthew". In Carson, D. A.; France, R. T.; Motyer, J. A.; Wenham, G. J. (eds.). New Bible Commentary: 21st Century Edition (4, illustrated, reprint, revised ed.). Inter-Varsity Press. pp. 904–945. ISBN 9780851106489.

Preceded by Matthew 6:13	Gospel of Matthew; Chapter 6	Succeeded by Matthew 6:16
