= Matthew 6:13 =

- ← 6:12 6:14 →
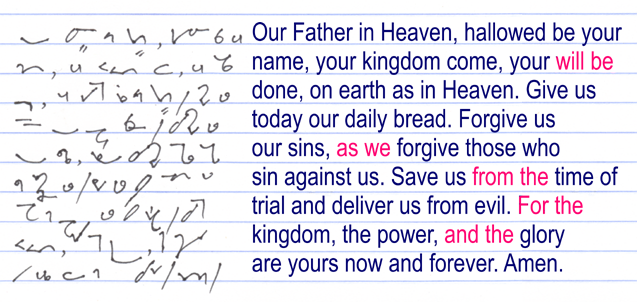
- The text of the English Language Liturgical Consultation version of the Lord's Prayer, written in Teeline Shorthand and in Latin script for comparison.
- Book: Gospel of Matthew
- Christian Bible part: New Testament

Matthew 6:13 is the thirteenth verse of the sixth chapter of the Gospel of Matthew in the New Testament, and forms part of the Sermon on the Mount. This verse is the fifth and final one of the Lord's Prayer, one of the best known parts of the entire New Testament.

== Content ==
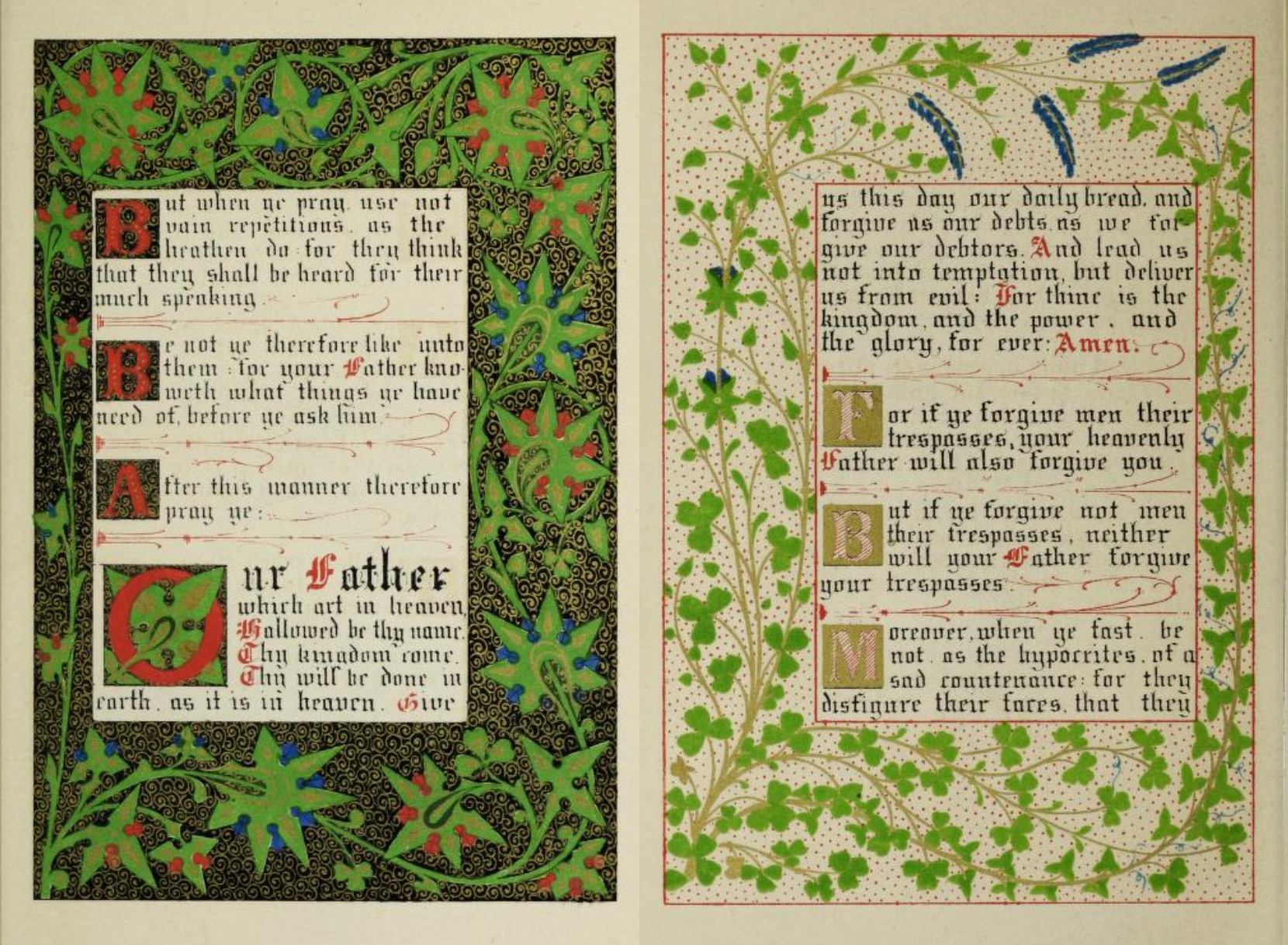
Matthew 6:7–16 from the 1845 illuminated book of The Sermon on the Mount, designed by Owen Jones.

In the King James Version of the Bible the text reads:

And lead us not into temptation, but deliver
us from evil: For thine is the kingdom, and
the power, and the glory, for ever. Amen.

The English Standard Version translates the passage as:

And lead us not into temptation,
but deliver us from evil.

The Novum Testamentum Graece text is:

καὶ μὴ εἰσενέγκῃς ἡμᾶς εἰς πειρασμόν,
ἀλλὰ ῥῦσαι ἡμᾶς ἀπὸ τοῦ πονηροῦ.

The doxology which concludes the Lord's Prayer is generally considered to be a later addition to the text and is usually omitted in modern translations into English.

== Commentary on Evil ==
Translations and scholars are divided over whether the prayer asks for protection from evil in general or from the evil one, i.e. Satan, in particular. The original Greek is ambiguous, but most modern translations have "evil one" as it is felt that this better reflects first century theology. The earlier reference to temptation could also be a clue that the great tempter of Matthew 4 is being referenced. Matthew 13:19 quite clearly refers to Satan when discussing similar issues. Hill, however, notes that "the evil" is used in neither Hebrew nor Aramaic to denote Satan and in Matthew 5:39 a similar wording quite clearly refers to general evil rather than Satan. John Calvin noted the vagueness of the verse, but did not feel it was important as there is little real difference between the two interpretations.

In 2017, Pope Francis, speaking on the Italian TV channel TV2000, proposed that the wording of the translation be changed to "do not let us fall into temptation", explaining that "I am the one who falls; it's not him [i.e. God] pushing me into temptation to then see how I have fallen". The Anglican theologian Ian Paul has highlighted how such a proposal is "stepping into a theological debate about the nature of evil". Indeed, one of the most important issues with this verse is that it seems to imply that God is the one who leads humans into sin, not humanity's innate sinfulness as Christian theologians generally believe. A literal reading of this verse could imply that God is the source of evil. There are several explanations for getting around this. The first is that temptation is not an accurate translation. Fowler suggests that the Greek term peirasmos can mean temptation, but can also mean "test of character". At several points in the Bible God tests his followers, and this could be a plea to avoid such unpleasant testing. Schweizer notes that this would be a departure from the Judaism of the period where the faithful would pray to be tested, so that they could prove their loyalty to God.

A second explanation, noted by Morris, is that test could be an eschatological reference to the fiery test God will put all to in the end times. Luz rejects this view, pointing out that nowhere in the New Testament is the term temptation connected to the last judgment, and that in the Jewish literature of the period temptation referred to the pitfalls of everyday life. Hill suggests that the Greek is only a loose translation of the Aramaic, and that Jesus would originally have used the expression "cause us not to enter," which does not imply that God is the cause of temptation, but only the protector against it.

== The doxology ==
The final sentence of this verse, the doxology, is generally considered to be a later addition to the text and is usually omitted in modern translations. The doxology is not included in the following modern translations:

- American Standard Version
- Contemporary English Version
- English Standard Version
- GOD'S WORD Translation
- Good News Translation
- New International Reader's Version
- New International Version
- New Living Translation
- Today's New International Version.

It is enclosed in square brackets in the Holman Christian Standard Bible, New American Standard Bible and New Century Version. Two publications which are updates of the Authorized King James Version (rather than new translations) keep it: 21st Century King James Version and New King James Version, but the second of these adds a note: " "NU-Text omits For Yours through Amen." It is absent from the oldest and best manuscripts of Matthew, and most scholars do not consider it part of the original text. It first appears in a slightly shorter form in the Didache from around 130 AD. The doxology appears in at least ten different forms in early texts before becoming standardized, also implying that it might not have been original to the Gospel.

A popular theory is that the doxology was originally appended to the prayer during congregational worship, as it was standard for Jewish prayers to have such endings. David Hill suggests it might have been based on 1 Chronicles 29:11. Once the phrase became the standard ending to the prayer in worship, copyists who were familiar with the longer form added the line to the Gospel itself. Anglican Bishop Charles Ellicott mentions the possibility that the words were "interpolated by transcribers to make the text of the discourse harmonise with the liturgies".

== Commentary from the Church Fathers ==
Pseudo-Chrysostom: As He had above put many high things into men’s mouths, teaching them to call God their Father, to pray that His kingdom might come; so now He adds a lesson of humility, when He says, and lead us not into temptation.

Augustine: Some copies read, Carry us not1, an equivalent word, both being a translation of one Greek word, εἰσενέγκης. Many in interpreting say, ‘Suffer us not to be led into temptation,’ as being what is implied in the word lead. For God does not of Himself lead a man, but suffer him to be led from whom He has withdrawn His aid.

Cyprian: Herein it is shown that the adversary can nothing avail against us, unless God first permit him; so that all our fear and devotion ought to be addressed to God.

Augustine: But it is one thing to be led into temptation, another to be tempted; for without temptation none can be approved, either to himself or to another; but every man is fully known to God before all trial. Therefore we do not here pray that we may not be tempted, but that we may not be led into temptation. As if one who was to be burnt alive should pray not that he should not be touched by fire, but that he should not be burnt. For we are then led into temptation when such temptations befal us as we are not able to resist.

Augustine: When then we say, Lead us not into temptation, what we ask is, that we may not, deserted by His aid, either consent through the subtle snares, or yield to the forcible might, of any temptation.

Cyprian: And in so praying we are cautioned of our own infirmity and weakness, lest any presumptuously exalt himself; that while a humble and submissive confession comes first, and all is referred to God, whatever we suppliantly apply for may by His gracious favour be supplied.

Augustine: We ought to pray not only that we may not be led into evil from which we are at present free; but further that we may be set free from that into which we have already been led. Therefore it follows, Deliver us from evil.

Cyprian: After all these preceding petitions at the conclusion of the prayer comes a sentence, comprising shortly and collectively the whole of our petitions and desires. For there remains nothing beyond for us to ask for, after petition made for God’s protection from evil; for that gained, we stand secure and safe against all things that the Devil and the world work against us. What fear hath he from this life, who has God through life for his guardian?

Augustine: This petition with which the Lord’s Prayer concludes is of such extent, that a Christian man in whatever tribulation cast, will in this petition utter groans, in this shed tears, here begin and here end his prayer. And therefore follows Amen, by which is expressed the strong desire of him that prays.

Jerome: Amen, which appears here at the close, is the seal of the Lord’s Prayer. Aquila rendered ‘faithfully’—we may perhaps ‘truly.’

Cyprian: We need not wonder, dearest brethren, that this is God’s prayer, seeing how His instruction comprises all our petitioning, in one saving sentence. This had already been prophesied by Isaiah the Prophet, A short word will God make in the whole earth. (Is. 10:22.) For when our Lord Jesus Christ came unto all, and gathering together the learned alike and the unlearned, did to every sex and age set forth the precepts of salvation, He made a full compendium of His instructions, that the memory of the scholars might not labour in the heavenly discipline, but accept with readiness whatsoever was necessary into a simple faith.

Chrysostom: Having made us anxious by the mention of our enemy, in this that He has said Deliver us from evil, He again restores confidence by that which is added in some copies, For thine is the kingdom, and the power, and the glory, since if His be the kingdom, none need fear, since even he who fights against us, must be His subject. But since His power and glory are infinite, He can not only deliver from evil, but also make glorious.

Pseudo-Chrysostom: This is also connected with the foregoing. Thine is the kingdom has reference to Thy kingdom come, that none should therefore say, God has no kingdom on earth. The power, answers to Thy will be done, as in earth so in heaven, that none should say thereon that God cannot perform whatever He would. And the glory, answers to all that follows, in which God’s glory is shown forth.

Preceded by Matthew 6:12	Gospel of Matthew; Chapter 6	Succeeded by Matthew 6:14
