= Lord's Prayer =

Christian prayer attributed to Jesus

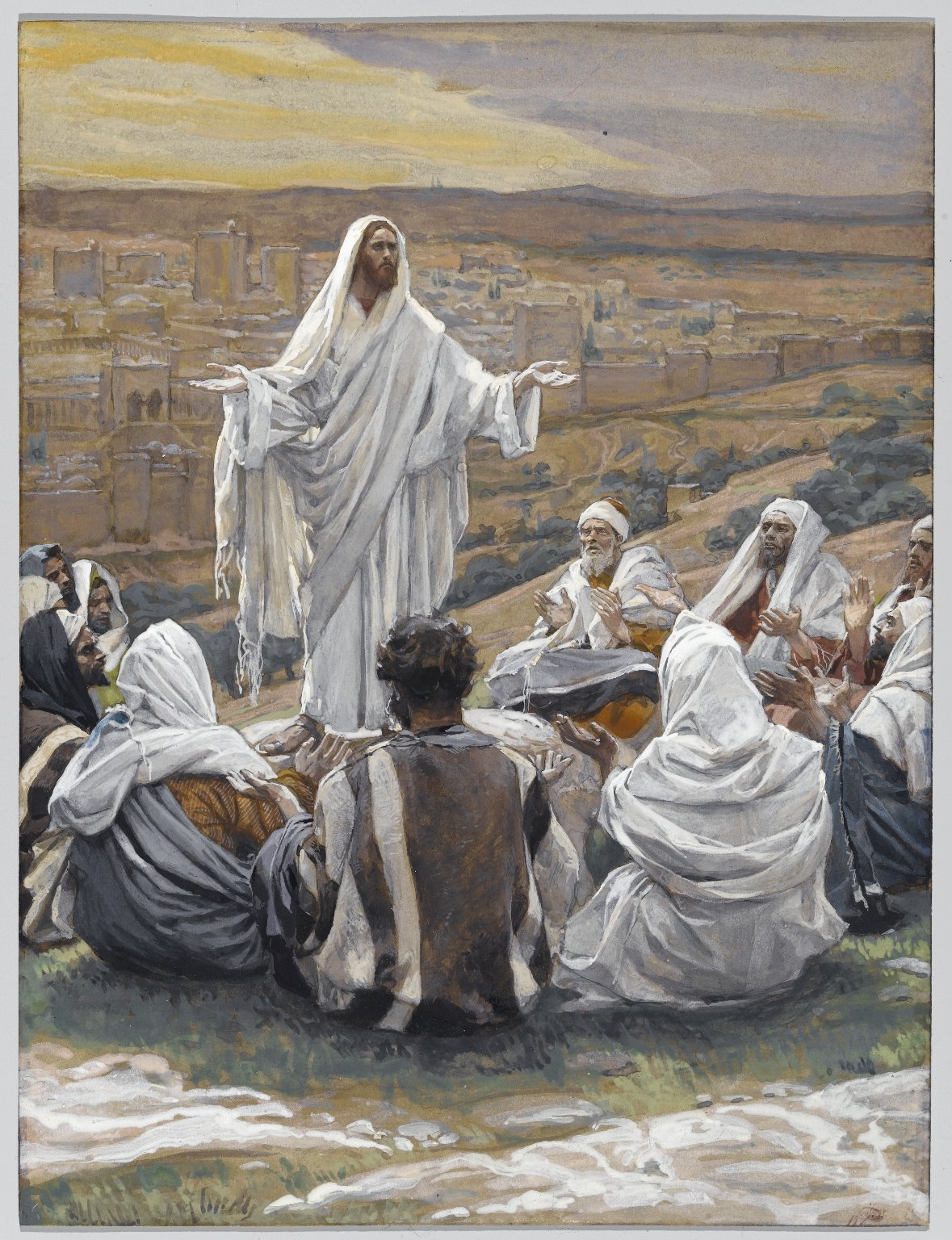
The Lord's Prayer (Le Pater Noster), by James Tissot

The Lord's Prayer, also known by its incipit Our Father (Greek: Πάτερ ἡμῶν, romanized: Páter ēmôn; Latin: Pater Noster), is a central Christian prayer attributed to Jesus. It contains petitions to God focused on God's holiness, will, and kingdom, as well as human needs, with variations across manuscripts and Christian traditions.

Most scholars regard the Lord's Prayer, as recorded in the New Testament gospels of Matthew and Luke, as deriving authentically from the historical Jesus. The prayer survives in two different versions, however, and the relationship between the Matthean and Lukan forms remains the subject of scholarly debate. The first-century text Didache (at chapter VIII) reports a version closely resembling that of Matthew and the modern prayer. It ends with the Minor Doxology.

Theologians broadly view the Lord's Prayer as a model that aligns the soul with God's will, emphasizing praise, trust, and ethical living. The prayer is used by most Christian denominations in their worship and, with few exceptions, the liturgical form is the Matthean version. It has been set to music for use in liturgical services.

Since the 16th century, the Lord's Prayer has been widely translated and collected to compare languages across regions and history. The Lord's Prayer shares thematic and linguistic parallels with prayers and texts from various religious traditions—including the Hebrew Bible, Jewish post-biblical prayers, and ancient writings like the Dhammapada and the Epic of Gilgamesh—though some elements, such as "Lead us not into temptation," have unique theological nuances without direct Old Testament counterparts. Music ranging from 9th-century Gregorian chant to modern works by Christopher Tin has incorporated the Lord's Prayer into a variety of religious and interfaith ceremonies.

== Texts ==
The text of the Lord's Prayer shown here is from the New International Version (NIV).

Matthew 6:9-13	Luke 11:2-4
Our Father in heaven,	Father, [Some manuscripts: 'Our Father in heaven']
hallowed be your name,	hallowed be your name,
your kingdom come,	your kingdom come.
your will be done, on earth as it is in heaven.	[Some manuscripts: 'come. May your will be done on earth as it is in heaven.']
Give us today our daily bread.	Give us each day our daily bread.
And forgive us our debts, as we also have forgiven our debtors.	Forgive us our sins, for we also forgive everyone who sins against us. [Greek 'everyone who is indebted to us']
And lead us not into temptation, [The Greek for 'temptation' can also mean 'testing'.] but deliver us from the evil one. [Or 'from evil']	And lead us not into temptation. [Some manuscripts: 'temptation, but deliver us from the evil one']
[some late manuscripts 'one, / for yours is the kingdom and the power and the glory forever. Amen.']	

Initial words on the topic from the Catechism of the Catholic Church teach that it "is truly the summary of the whole gospel".

The first three of the seven petitions in Matthew address God; the other four are related to human needs and concerns. Matthew's account alone includes the "Your will be done" and the "Rescue us from the evil one" (or "Deliver us from evil") petitions. Both original Greek texts contain the adjective epiousion; while controversial, 'daily' has been the most common English-language translation of this word. Protestants usually conclude the prayer with a doxology (in some versions, "For thine is the kingdom, the power and the glory, for ever and ever, Amen"), a later addition appearing in some manuscripts of Matthew. The Eastern Orthodox version is: For Thine is the kingdom, and the power, and the glory: of the Father, and of the Son, and of the Holy Spirit, now and ever, and unto the ages of ages. Amen.

== Historicity and literary relations ==
Most scholars accept the Lord's Prayer to be authentic. Dale Allison is confident that the Historical Jesus composed the Lord's Prayer, as is John P. Meier.

Though some scholars suggest that Jesus himself spoke multiple versions of the Lord's Prayer, the gospels are known for reshaping narratives; Craig Keener describes the prayer as a Matthean construct. The absence of the Lord's Prayer in the Gospel of Mark and its occurrence in Matthew and Luke has caused supporters of the two-source hypothesis to conclude its origin from Q, though alternative theories positing Luke's direct use of Matthew or vice versa are growing in popularity among scholars. Davies and Allison believed it is also possible more than one version was present in Synoptic sources and do not view the notion that Luke's version used Matthew as plausible, and Marianus Pale Hera agreed that the two versions were independently used in the Jewish and Gentile Christian communities, though recent scholarship is more skeptical of source criticism.

If either source built on the other, Martin Dibelius and Joachim Jeremias attribute priority to Luke on the grounds that "in the early period, before wordings were fixed, liturgical texts were elaborated, expanded and enriched". On the other hand, Michael Goulder, Thomas J. Mosbo and Ken Olson see the shorter Lucan version as a reworking of the Matthaean text, removing unnecessary verbiage and repetition.

The Matthaean version is the one most common in general Christian usage.

== Greek texts ==
Liturgical text	Codex Vaticanus text	Didache text
πάτερ ἡμῶν ὁ ἐν τοῖς οὐρανοῖς	πατερ ημων ο εν τοις ουρανοις	πατερ ημων ο εν τω ουρανω
ἁγιασθήτω τὸ ὄνομά σου	αγιασθητω το ονομα σου	αγιασθητω το ονομα σου
ἐλθέτω ἡ βασιλεία σου	ελθετω η βασιλεια σου	ελθετω η βασιλεια σου
γενηθήτω τὸ θέλημά σου ὡς ἐν οὐρανῷ καὶ ἐπὶ τῆς γῆς	γενηθητω το θελημα σου ως εν ουρανω και επι γης	γενηθητω το θελημα σου ως εν ουρανω και επι γης
τὸν ἄρτον ἡμῶν τὸν ἐπιούσιον δὸς ἡμῖν σήμερον	τον αρτον ημων τον επιουσιον δος ημιν σημερον	τον αρτον ημων τον επιουσιον δος ημιν σημερον
καὶ ἄφες ἡμῖν τὰ ὀφειλήματα ἡμῶν ὡς καὶ ἡμεῖς ἀφίεμεν τοῖς ὀφειλέταις ἡμῶν	και αφες ημιν τα οφειληματα ημων ως και ημεις αφηκαμεν τοις οφειλεταις ημων	και αφες ημιν την οφειλην ημων ως και ημεις αφιεμεν τοις οφειλεταις ημων
καὶ μὴ εἰσενέγκῃς ἡμᾶς εἰς πειρασμόν ἀλλὰ ῥῦσαι ἡμᾶς ἀπὸ τοῦ πονηροῦ	και μη εισενεγκης ημας εις πειρασμον αλλα ρυσαι ημας απο του πονηρου	και μη εισενεγκης ημας εις πειρασμον αλλα ρυσαι ημας απο του πονηρου

The majority percentage of the verbs are aorist imperatives. In the first part of the prayer there are third person passive imperatives, while in the last one there are second person active imperatives.

== Original Greek text and Syriac and Latin translations ==
=== Standard edition of the Greek text ===
The text given here is that of the latest edition of Greek New Testament of the United Bible Societies and in the Nestle-Aland Novum Testamentum Graece. Most modern translations use a text similar to this one. Most older translations are based on a Byzantine-type text with ἐπὶ τῆς γῆς in line 5 (verse 10) instead of ἐπὶ γῆς, and ἀφίεμεν in line 8 (verse 12) instead of ἀφήκαμεν, and adding at the end (verse 13) the doxology ὅτι σοῦ ἐστιν ἡ βασιλεία καὶ ἡ δύναμις καὶ ἡ δόξα εἰς τοὺς αἰῶνας. ἀμήν.

1. πάτερ ἡμῶν ὁ ἐν τοῖς οὐρανοῖς
  (páter hēmôn ho en toîs ouranoîs)
2. ἁγιασθήτω τὸ ὄνομά σου
  (hagiasthḗtō tò ónomá sou)
3. ἐλθέτω ἡ βασιλεία σου
  (elthétō hē basileía sou)
4. γενηθήτω τὸ θέλημά σου ὡς ἐν οὐρανῷ καὶ ἐπὶ γῆς
  (genēthḗtō tò thélēmá sou hōs en ouranô(i) kaì epì gês)
5. τὸν ἄρτον ἡμῶν τὸν ἐπιούσιον δὸς ἡμῖν σήμερον
  (tòn árton hēmôn tòn epioúsion dòs hēmîn sḗmeron)
6. καὶ ἄφες ἡμῖν τὰ ὀφειλήματα ἡμῶν ὡς καὶ ἡμεῖς ἀφήκαμεν τοῖς ὀφειλέταις ἡμῶν
  (kaì áphes hēmîn tà opheilḗmata hēmôn hōs kaì hēmeîs aphḗkamen toîs opheilétais hēmôn)
7. καὶ μὴ εἰσενέγκῃς ἡμᾶς εἰς πειρασμόν ἀλλὰ ῥῦσαι ἡμᾶς ἀπὸ τοῦ πονηροῦ
  (kaì mḕ eisenénkēis hēmâs eis peirasmón allà rhŷsai hēmâs apò toû ponēroû)

=== Standard edition of the Syriac text of the Peshitta ===
The Classical Syriac vowels here transcribed as "ê", "ā" and "o/ō" have been raised to "i", "o" and "u" respectively in Western Syriac.

1. ܐܒ݂ܘܢ ܕ̇ܒ݂ܫܡܝܐ
  (ʾăḇūn d-ḇa-šmayyā)
2. ܢܬ݂ܩܕ݁ܫ ܫܡܟ݂
  (neṯqaddaš šmāḵ)
3. ܬ݁ܐܬ݂ܐ ܡܠܟ݁ܘܬ݂ܟ݂
  (têṯē malkūṯāḵ)
4. ܢܗܘܐ ܨܒ݂ܝܢܟ݂ ܐܝܟ݁ܢܐ ܕ݂ܒ݂ܫܡܝܐ ܐܦ݂ ܒ݁ܐܪܥܐ
  (nēhwē ṣeḇyānāḵ ʾaykannā ḏ-ḇa-šmayyā ʾāp̄ b-ʾarʿā)
5. ܗܒ݂ ܠܢ ܠܚܡܐ ܕ݂ܣܘܢܩܢܢ ܝܘܡܢܐ
  (haḇ lan laḥmā ḏ-sūnqānan yawmānā)
6. ܘܫܒ݂ܘܩ ܠܢ ܚܘ̈ܒ݁ܝܢ ܐܝܟܢܐ ܕ݂ܐܦ݂ ܚܢܢ ܫܒ݂ܩܢ ܠܚܝ̈ܒ݂ܝܢ
  (wa-šḇoq lan ḥawbayn ʾaykannā ḏ-ʾāp̄ ḥnan šḇaqn l-ḥayyāḇayn)
7. ܘܠܐ ܬ݂ܥܠܢ ܠܢܣܝܘܢܐ ܐܠܐ ܦ݂ܨܢ ܡܢ ܒ݁ܝܫܐ
  (w-lā ṯaʿlan l-nesyōnā ʾellā p̄aṣṣān men bīšā)

=== Vulgata Clementina (1692) ===
There are four editions of the Vulgate: the Sixtine Vulgate, the Sixto-Clementine Vulgate, the Nova Vulgata, and the Stuttgart Vulgate. The Clementine edition varies from the Nova Vulgata in this place only in punctuation and in having "ne nos inducas" in place of "ne inducas nos". The Stuttgart Vulgate has "qui in caelis es" in place of "qui es in caelis"; "veniat" in place of "adveniat"; "dimisimus" in place of "dimittimus"; and "temptationem" in place of "tentationem".

1. pater noster qui es in cælis
2. sanctificetur nomen tuum
3. adveniat regnum tuum
4. fiat voluntas tua sicut in cælo et in terra
5. panem nostrum supersubstantialem da nobis hodie
6. et dimitte nobis debita nostra sicut et nos dimittimus debitoribus nostris
7. et ne nos inducas in tentationem sed libera nos a malo (Note: In the Nova Vulgata, the official Latin Bible of the Catholic Church, the last word is capitalized, indicating that it is a reference to Malus (the Evil One), not to malum (abstract or generic evil).)

The doxology associated with the Lord's Prayer in Byzantine Greek texts is found in four Vetus Latina manuscripts, only two of which give it in its entirety. The other surviving manuscripts of the Vetus Latina Gospels do not have the doxology. The Vulgate translation also does not include it, thus agreeing with critical editions of the Greek text.

== Liturgical texts: Greek, Syriac, Latin ==
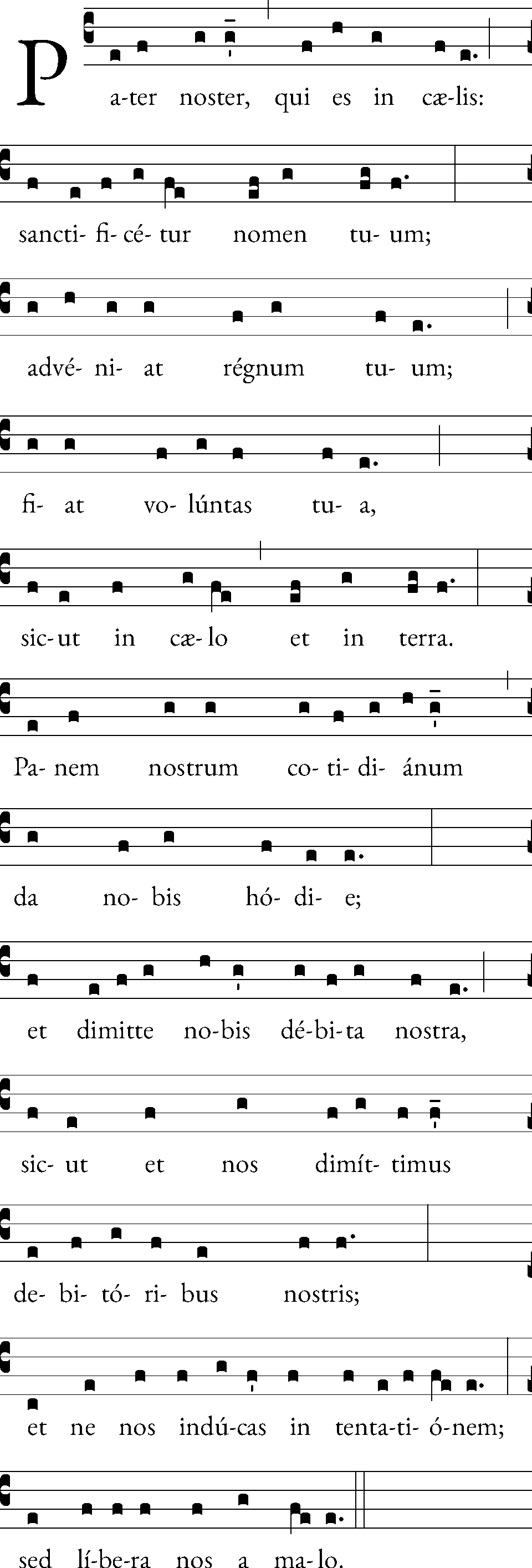
The Lord's Prayer (Latin liturgical text) with Gregorian chant annotation Pater Noster The Lord's Prayer sung in Gregorian chant

Patriarchal Edition 1904 (Note: The Greek Orthodox Church uses a slightly different Greek version. which can be found in many liturgical texts, e.g., the Divine Liturgy of St. John Chrysostom ( Greek Orthodox Liturgy of St. John Chrysostom), as presented in the 1904 text of the Ecumenical Patriarchate of Constantinople and various Greek prayer books and liturgies. This is the Greek version of the Lord's Prayer most widely used for prayer and liturgy today, and is similar to other texts of the Byzantine text-type used in older English Bible translations, with ἐπὶ τῆς γῆς instead of ἐπὶ γῆς on line 5 and ἀφίεμεν instead of ἀφήκαμεν (present rather than aorist tense) in line 8. Whenever a priest is officiating, he replies with this augmented form of the doxology, "For thine is the kingdom and the power and the glory: of the Father, and of the Son, and of the Holy Spirit, now and ever, and unto ages of ages.", (Note: In Greek: Ὅτι σοῦ ἐστὶν ἡ βασιλεία καὶ ἡ δύναμις καὶ ἡ δόξα· τοῦ Πατρὸς καὶ τοῦ Υἱοῦ καὶ τοῦ Ἁγίου Πνεύματος· νῦν καὶ ἀεὶ καὶ εἰς τοὺς αἰῶνας τῶν αἰώνων.) and in either instance, reciter(s) of the prayer reply "Amen".)

Πάτερ ἡμῶν ὁ ἐν τοῖς οὐρανοῖς,
Páter hēmōn ho en toîs ouranoîs,

ἁγιασθήτω τὸ ὄνομά σου,
hagiasthētō to onomá sou,

ἐλθέτω ἡ βασιλεία σου,
elthétō hē basileía sou,

γενηθήτω τὸ θέλημά σου ὡς ἐν οὐρανῷ καὶ ἐπὶ τῆς γῆς.
genēthētō to thélēmá sou hōs en ouranōi kaì epì tês gês.

τὸν ἄρτον ἡμῶν τὸν ἐπιούσιον δὸς ἡμῖν σήμερον,
tòn árton hēmōn tòn epioúsion dòs hēmîn sēmeron,

καὶ ἄφες ἡμῖν τὰ ὀφειλήματα ἡμῶν, ὡς καὶ ἡμεῖς ἀφίεμεν τοῖς ὀφειλέταις ἡμῶν.
kaì aphes hēmîn tà opheilēmata hēmōn, hōs kaì hēmeîs aphíemen toîs opheilétais hēmōn.

καὶ μὴ εἰσενέγκῃς ἡμᾶς εἰς πειρασμόν, ἀλλὰ ῥῦσαι ἡμᾶς ἀπὸ τοῦ πονηροῦ.
kaì mē eisenénkēis hēmâs eis peirasmón, allà rhŷsai hēmâs apò toû ponēroû.

Syriac liturgical
ܐܒ݂ܘܢ ܕ݁ܒ݂ܫܡܝܐ
Abun d-bashmayo
(Our father who art in heaven)

ܢܬ݂ܩܕ݁ܫ ܫܡܟ݂
Nethqadash shmokh
(hallowed be thy name)

ܬ݁ܐܬ݂ܐ ܡܠܟ݁ܘܬ݂ܟ݂
Tithe malkuthokh
(thy kingdom come)

ܢܗܘܐ ܨܒ݂ܝܢܟ݂ ܐܝܟ݁ܢܐ ܕ݂ܒ݂ܫܡܝܐ ܐܦ݂ ܒ݁ܐܪܥܐ
Nehwe sebyonokh aykano d-bashmayo oph bar'o
(thy will be done as it is in heaven also on earth)

ܗܒ݂ ܠܢ ܠܚܡܐ ܕ݂ܣܘܢܩܢܢ ܝܘܡܢܐ
Hab lan lahmo d-sunqonan yawmono
(give us the bread of our need this day) (Note: Matthew 6:11 and Luke 11:3 Curetonian Gospels used ʾammīnā (ܐܡܝܢܐ) "constant bread" like Vulgata Clementina used quotidianum "daily bread" in Luke 11:3; see Epiousion.)

ܘܫܒ݂ܘܩ ܠܢ ܚܘ̈ܒ݁ܝܢ ܘܚܛܗ̈ܝܢ ܐܝܟ݁ܢܐ ܕ݂ܐܦ݂ ܚܢܢ ܫܒ݂ܩܢ ܠܚܝ̈ܒ݂ܝܢ
W-shbuq lan hubayn wa-htahayn aykano d-oph hnan shbaqn l-hayobayn
(and forgive us our debts and our sins as we have forgiven our debtors) (Note: Syriac liturgical text adds "and our sins" to some verses in Matthew 6:12 and Luke 11:4.)

ܘܠܐ ܬ݂ܥܠܢ ܠܢܣܝܘܢܐ ܐܠܐ ܦ݂ܨܢ ܡܢ ܒ݁ܝܫܐ
W-lo tha'lan l-nesyono elo fason men bisho
(and bring us not into temptation but deliver us from evil) (Note: Syriac "deliver" relates with "Passover", thus Passover means "deliverance": Exodus 12:13.)

ܡܛܠ ܕ݁ܕ݂ܝܠܟ݂ ܗ̄ܝ ܡܠܟ݁ܘܬ݂ܐ ܚܝܠܐ ܬ݂ܫܒ݁ܘܚܬ݁ܐ ܠܥܠܡ ܥܠܡܝܢ ܐܡܝܢ
Metul d-dilokh hi malkutho haylo wa-teshbuhto l-'olam 'olmin. Amin.
(for thine is the kingdom the power the glory for an age of ages amen) (Note: "And" is absent in between the words "kingdom, power, glory". The Old Syriac Curetonian Gospel text varies: "for thine is the kingdom and the glory for an age of ages amen".) (Note: Didache finishes the prayer just with duality of words "for Thine is the Power and the Glory for ages" without any "amen" in the end. Old Syriac text of Curetonian Gospels finishes the prayer also with duality of words "for Thine is the Kingdom and the Glory for age ages. Amen")

Roman Missal (Note: The version of the Lord's Prayer most familiar to Western European Christians until the Protestant Reformation is that in the Roman Missal, which has had cultural and historical importance for most regions where English is spoken. The text is used in the Roman Rite liturgy (Mass, Liturgy of the Hours, etc.). It differs from the Vulgate in having cotidianum in place of supersubstantial. It does not add the doxology: this is never joined immediately to the Lord's Prayer in the Latin liturgy or the Latin Bible, but it appears, in the form quia tuum est regnum, et potestas, et gloria, in saecula, in the Mass of the Roman Rite, as revised in 1969, separated from the Lord's Prayer by the prayer, Libera nos, quaesumus... (the embolism), which elaborates on the final petition, Libera nos a malo (deliver us from evil). Others have translated the doxology into Latin as quia tuum est regnum; et potentia et gloria; per omnia saecula or …in saecula saeculorum.)

Pater noster qui es in cælis:
sanctificétur nomen tuum;
advéniat regnum tuum;
fiat volúntas tua, sicut in cælo, et in terra.
Panem nostrum cotidiánum (Note: In editions of the Roman Missal prior to that of 1962 (the edition of Pope John XXIII) the word cotidianum was spelled quotidianum.) da nobis hódie;
et dimítte nobis débita nostra,
sicut et nos dimíttimus debitóribus nostris;
et ne nos indúcas in tentatiónem;
sed líbera nos a malo.

== English versions ==
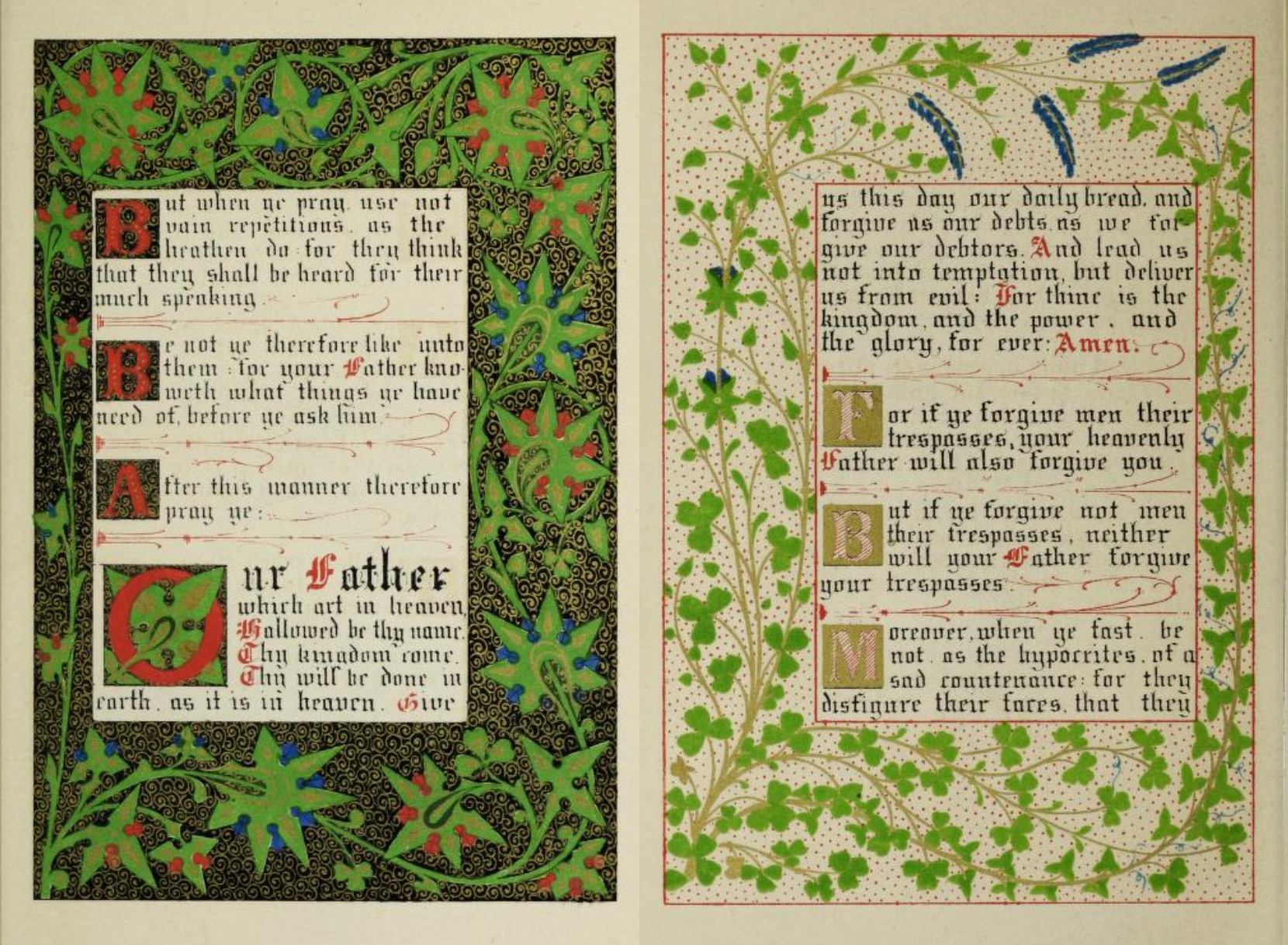
Lord's Prayer from the 1845 illuminated book of The Sermon on the Mount, designed by Owen Jones

There are several different English translations of the Lord's Prayer from Greek or Latin, beginning around AD 650 with the Northumbrian translation. Of those in current liturgical use, the three best-known are:

- The translation in the 1662 Book of Common Prayer (BCP) of the Church of England
- The slightly modernized "traditional ecumenical" form used in the Catholic, and (often with doxology) in many Protestant Churches
- The 1988 translation of the ecumenical English Language Liturgical Consultation (ELLC)

All these versions are based on the text in Matthew, rather than Luke, of the prayer given by Jesus.

=== Book of Common Prayer, 1662 ===
Our Father, which art in heaven,
Hallowed be thy Name;
Thy kingdom come;
Thy will be done
in earth, as it is in heaven:
Give us this day our daily bread;
And forgive us our trespasses,
as we forgive them that trespass against us;
And lead us not into temptation,
But deliver us from evil;
For thine is the kingdom,
the power, and the glory,
For ever and ever.
Amen.

— BCP (1662)

=== Traditional ecumenical version ===
Our Father, who art in heaven,
hallowed be thy name;
thy kingdom come,
thy will be done
on earth as it is in heaven.
Give us this day our daily bread,
and forgive us our trespasses,
as we forgive those who trespass against us;
and lead us not into temptation,
but deliver us from evil.

Most Protestants conclude with the doxology:
For thine is the kingdom,
the power, and the glory,
for ever and ever. Amen. (or ...forever. Amen.)

At Mass in the Catholic Church the embolism is followed by:
For the kingdom,
the power and the glory are yours,
now and for ever.

— Traditional ecumenical version

=== 1988 English Language Liturgical Consultation ===
Our Father in heaven,
hallowed be your name,
your kingdom come,
your will be done,
on earth as in heaven.
Give us today our daily bread.
Forgive us our sins
as we forgive those who sin against us.
Save us from the time of trial
and deliver us from evil.
For the kingdom, the power, and the glory are yours
now and for ever. Amen.

— 1988 ELLC

The concluding doxology ("For thine is the kingdom, the power, and the glory for ever") is representative of the practice of concluding prayers with a short, hymn-like verse that exalts the glory of God. Older English translations of the Bible, based on late Byzantine Greek manuscripts, included it, but it is absent in the oldest manuscripts and is not considered to be part of the original text of Matthew 6:9–13. The translators of the 1611 King James Bible assumed that a Greek manuscript they possessed was ancient and therefore adopted the text into the Lord's Prayer of the Gospel of Matthew. The use of the doxology in English dates from at least 1549 with the First Prayer Book of Edward VI which was influenced by William Tyndale's New Testament translation in 1526.

In the Byzantine Rite, whenever a priest is officiating, after the Lord's Prayer he intones this augmented form of the doxology, "For thine is the kingdom and the power and the glory: of the Father, and of the Son, and of the Holy Spirit, now and ever, and unto ages of ages.", (Note: In Greek: Ὅτι σοῦ ἐστὶν ἡ βασιλεία καὶ ἡ δύναμις καὶ ἡ δόξα· τοῦ Πατρὸς καὶ τοῦ Υἱοῦ καὶ τοῦ Ἁγίου Πνεύματος· νῦν καὶ ἀεὶ καὶ εἰς τοὺς αἰῶνας τῶν αἰώνων.) and in either instance, reciter(s) of the prayer reply "Amen".

The Catholic Latin liturgical rites have never attached the doxology to the end of the Lord's Prayer. The doxology does appear in the Roman Rite Mass as revised in 1969. After the conclusion of the Lord's Prayer, the priest says a prayer known as the embolism. In the official International Commission on English in the Liturgy (ICEL) English translation, the embolism reads: "Deliver us, Lord, we pray, from every evil, graciously grant peace in our days, that, by the help of your mercy, we may be always free from sin and safe from all distress, as we await the blessed hope and the coming of our Saviour, Jesus Christ." This elaborates on the final petition, "Deliver us from evil." The people then respond to this with the doxology: "For the kingdom, the power, and the glory are yours, now and forever."

== Analysis ==
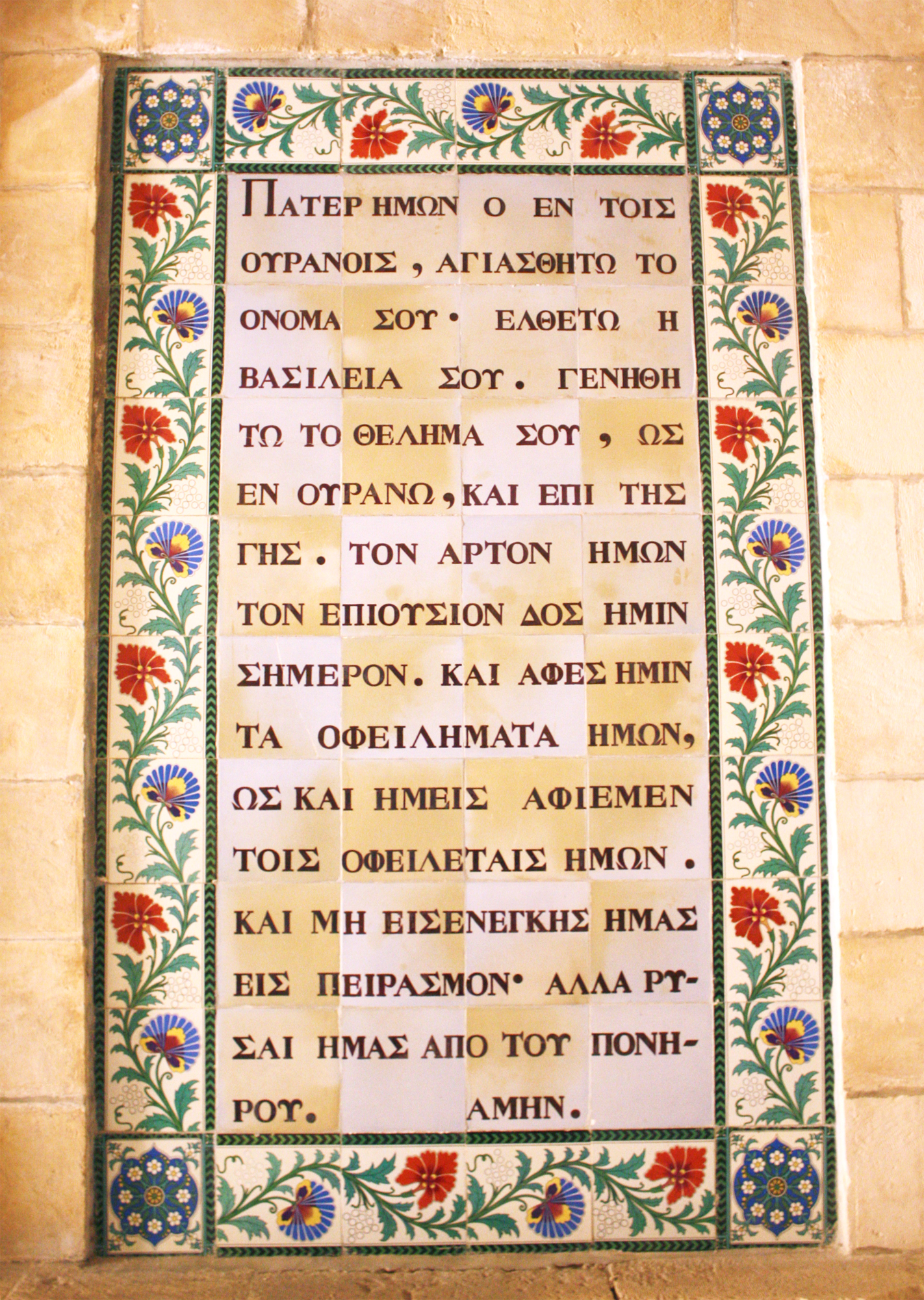
The Lord's Prayer in Greek

Augustine of Hippo gives the following analysis of the Lord's Prayer, which elaborates on Jesus' words just before it in the Gospel of Matthew: "Your Father knows what you need before you ask him. Pray then in this way" (Matthew 6:8–9):

We need to use words (when we pray) so that we may remind ourselves to consider carefully what we are asking, not so that we may think we can instruct the Lord or prevail on him. When we say: "Hallowed be your name", we are reminding ourselves to desire that his name, which in fact is always holy, should also be considered holy among men. [...] But this is a help for men, not for God. [...] And as for our saying: "Your kingdom come," it will surely come whether we will it or not. But we are stirring up our desires for the kingdom so that it can come to us and we can deserve to reign there. [...] When we say: "Deliver us from evil," we are reminding ourselves to reflect on the fact that we do not yet enjoy the state of blessedness in which we shall suffer no evil. [...] It was very appropriate that all these truths should be entrusted to us to remember in these very words. Whatever be the other words we may prefer to say (words which the one praying chooses so that his disposition may become clearer to himself or which he simply adopts so that his disposition may be intensified), we say nothing that is not contained in the Lord's Prayer, provided of course we are praying in a correct and proper way.

This excerpt from Augustine is included in the Office of Readings in the Catholic Liturgy of the Hours.

Many have written biblical commentaries on the Lord's Prayer. Contained below are a variety of selections from some of those commentaries.

=== Introduction ===
Our Father, which art in heaven

"Our" indicates that the prayer is that of a group of people who consider themselves children of God and who call God their "Father". "In heaven" indicates that the Father who is addressed is distinct from human fathers on earth.

Augustine interpreted "heaven" (coelum, sky) in this context as meaning "in the hearts of the righteous, as it were in His holy temple".

=== First Petition ===
Hallowed be thy Name;

Former archbishop of Canterbury Rowan Williams explains this phrase as a petition that people may look upon God's name as holy, as something that inspires awe and reverence, and that they may not trivialize it by making God a tool for their purposes, to "put other people down, or as a sort of magic to make themselves feel safe". He sums up the meaning of the phrase by saying: "Understand what you're talking about when you're talking about God, this is serious, this is the most wonderful and frightening reality that we could imagine, more wonderful and frightening than we can imagine."

Richard Challoner writes that: "[t]his petition claims the first place in the Lord's prayer [...]; because the first and principal duty of a Christian is, to love his God with his whole heart and soul, and therefore the first and principal thing he ought to desire and pray for is, the great honor and glory of God."

=== Second Petition ===
Thy kingdom come;

"This petition has its parallel in the Jewish prayer, 'May he establish his Kingdom during your life and during your days.'" In the gospels Jesus speaks frequently of God's kingdom, but never defines the concept: "He assumed this was a concept so familiar that it did not require definition." Concerning how Jesus' audience in the gospels would have understood him, George Eldon Ladd turns to the concept's Hebrew biblical background: "The Hebrew word malkuth [...] refers first to a reign, dominion, or rule and only secondarily to the realm over which a reign is exercised. [...] When malkuth is used of God, it almost always refers to his authority or to his rule as the heavenly King." This petition looks to the perfect establishment of God's rule in the world in the future, an act of God resulting in the eschatological order of the new age.

The Catholic Church believes that, by praying the Lord's prayer, a Christian hastens the Second Coming. Like the church, some denominations see the coming of God's kingdom as a divine gift to be prayed for, not a human achievement. Others believe that the Kingdom will be fostered by the hands of those faithful who work for a better world. These believe that Jesus' commands to feed the hungry and clothe the needy make the seeds of the kingdom already present on earth (Lk 8:5–15; Mt 25:31–40).

Hilda C. Graef notes that the operative Greek word, basileia, means both kingdom and kingship (i.e., reign, dominion, governing, etc.), but that the English word kingdom loses this double meaning. Kingship adds a psychological meaning to the petition: one is also praying for the condition of soul where one follows God's will.

Richard Challoner, commenting on this petition, notes that the kingdom of God can be understood in three ways: 1) of the eternal kingdom of God in heaven. 2) of the spiritual kingdom of Christ, in his Church upon earth. 3) of the mystical kingdom of God, in our souls, according to the words of Christ, "The kingdom of God is within you" (Luke 17:21).

=== Third Petition ===
Thy will be done in earth, as it is in heaven:

According to William Barclay, this phrase is a couplet with the same meaning as "Thy kingdom come". Barclay argues that "the kingdom is a state of things on earth in which God's will is as perfectly done as it is in heaven. ...To do the will of God and to be in the Kingdom of God are one and the same thing."

John Ortberg interprets this phrase as follows: "Many people think our job is to get my afterlife destination taken care of, then tread water till we all get ejected and God comes back and torches this place. But Jesus never told anybody – neither his disciples nor us – to pray, 'Get me out of here so I can go up there.' His prayer was, 'Make up there come down here.' Make things down here run the way they do up there." Stephen Cottrell makes the same point in his reflections on "Thy Kingdom Come": "the promise of the gospel isn't really us going up to heaven, but heaven coming down to earth". The request that "thy will be done" is God's invitation to "join him in making things down here the way they are up there".

=== Fourth Petition ===
Give us this day our daily [epiousion] bread;

As mentioned earlier, the original word ἐπιούσιος (epiousion), commonly characterized as daily, is unique to the Lord's Prayer in all of ancient Greek literature. The word is almost a hapax legomenon, occurring only in Luke and Matthew's versions of the Lord's Prayer, and nowhere else in any other extant Greek texts. While epiousion is often substituted by the word "daily", all other New Testament translations from the Greek into "daily" otherwise reference hemeran (ἡμέραν, "the day"), which does not appear in this usage.

Jerome by linguistic parsing translated "ἐπιούσιον" (epiousion) as "supersubstantialem" in the Gospel of Matthew, but as "cotidianum" ("daily") in the Gospel of Luke. This wide-ranging difference with respect to meaning of epiousion is discussed in detail in the current Catechism of the Catholic Church in an inclusive approach toward tradition as well as a literal one for meaning: "Taken in a temporal sense, this word is a pedagogical repetition of 'this day', to confirm us in trust 'without reservation'. Taken in the qualitative sense, it signifies what is necessary for life, and more broadly every good thing sufficient for subsistence. Taken literally (epi-ousios: 'super-essential'), it refers directly to the Bread of Life, the Body of Christ, the 'medicine of immortality,' without which we have no life within us."

Epiousion is translated as supersubstantialem in the Vulgate Matthew 6:11 and accordingly as supersubstantial in the Douay–Rheims Bible Matthew 6:11.

Barclay M. Newman's A Concise Greek-English Dictionary of the New Testament, published in a revised edition in 2010 by the United Bible Societies, has the following entry:

ἐπι|ούσιος, ον (εἰμί) of doubtful meaning, for today; for the coming day; necessary for existence.

It thus derives the word from the preposition ἐπί (epi) and the verb εἰμί (eimi), from the latter of which are derived words such as οὐσία (ousia), the range of whose meanings is indicated in A Greek–English Lexicon.

=== Fifth Petition ===
And forgive us our trespasses, as we forgive them that trespass against us;

Although Matthew 6:12 uses the term debts, most older English versions of the Lord's Prayer use the term trespasses, while ecumenical versions often use the term sins. The last choice may be due to Luke 11:4, which uses the word sins, while the former may be due to Matthew 6:14 (immediately after the text of the prayer), where Jesus speaks of trespasses. As early as the third century, Origen of Alexandria used the word trespasses (παραπτώματα) in the prayer.

The Latin form that was traditionally used in Western Europe has debita (debts), but most English-speaking Christians (except Scottish Presbyterians and some others of the Dutch Reformed tradition) use trespasses. For example, the Church of Scotland, the Presbyterian Church (USA), the Reformed Church in America, as well as some Congregational heritage churches in the United Church of Christ follow the version found in Matthew 6 in the King James Version (KJV), which in the prayer uses the words debts and debtors.

The Presbyterian and other Reformed churches tend to use the rendering "forgive us our debts, as we forgive our debtors". Roman Catholics, Lutherans, Anglicans and Methodists are more likely to say "trespasses... those who trespass against us".

The "debts" form appears in the first English translation of the Bible, by John Wycliffe in 1395 (Wycliffe spelling "dettis"). The "trespasses" version appears in the 1526 translation by William Tyndale (Tyndale spelling "treaspases"). In 1549 the first Book of Common Prayer in English used a version of the prayer with "trespasses". This became the "official" version used in Anglican congregations. On the other hand, the 1611 King James Version, the version specifically authorized for the Church of England, has "forgive us our debts, as we forgive our debtors".

After the request for bread, Matthew and Luke diverge slightly. Matthew continues with a request for debts to be forgiven in the same manner as people have forgiven those who have debts against them. Luke, on the other hand, makes a similar request about sins being forgiven in the manner of debts being forgiven between people. The word "debts" (ὀφειλήματα) does not necessarily mean financial obligations, as shown by the use of the verbal form of the same word (ὀφείλετε) in passages such as Romans 13:8. The Aramaic word ḥôbâ can mean "debt" or "sin". This difference between Luke's and Matthew's wording could be explained by the original form of the prayer having been in Aramaic. The generally accepted interpretation is thus that the request is for forgiveness of sin, not of supposed loans granted by God. Asking for forgiveness from God was a staple of Jewish prayers (e.g., Penitential Psalms). It was also considered proper for individuals to be forgiving of others, so the sentiment expressed in the prayer would have been a common one of the time.

Anthony C. Deane, Canon of Worcester Cathedral, suggested that the choice of the word "ὀφειλήματα" (debts), rather than "ἁμαρτίας" (sins), indicates a reference to failures to use opportunities of doing good. He linked this with the parable of the sheep and the goats (also in Matthew's Gospel), in which the grounds for condemnation are not wrongdoing in the ordinary sense, but failure to do right, missing opportunities for showing love to others.

"As we forgive ...". Divergence between Matthew's "debts" and Luke's "sins" is relatively trivial compared to the impact of the second half of this statement. The verses immediately following the Lord's Prayer, Matthew 6:14–15 show Jesus teaching that the forgiveness of our sin/debt (by God) is linked with how we forgive others, as in the Parable of the Unforgiving Servant Matthew 18:23–35, which Matthew gives later. R. T. France comments:

The point is not so much that forgiving is a prior condition of being forgiven, but that forgiving cannot be a one-way process. Like all God's gifts it brings responsibility; it must be passed on. To ask for forgiveness on any other basis is hypocrisy. There can be no question, of course, of our forgiving being in proportion to what we are forgiven, as 18:23–35 makes clear.

— R. T. France, The Gospel According to Matthew: An Introduction and Commentary

=== Sixth Petition ===
And lead us not into temptation,

Interpretations of the penultimate petition of the prayer – not to be led by God into peirasmos – vary considerably. The range of meanings of the Greek word "πειρασμός" (peirasmos) is illustrated in New Testament Greek lexicons. In different contexts it can mean temptation, testing, trial, experiment. Although the traditional English translation uses the word "temptation" and Carl Jung saw God as actually leading people astray, Christians generally interpret the petition as not contradicting James 1:13–14: "Let no one say when he is tempted, 'I am being tempted by God', for God cannot be tempted with evil, and he himself tempts no one. But each person is tempted when he is lured and enticed by his own desire." Some see the petition as an eschatological appeal against unfavourable Last Judgment, a theory supported by the use of the word "peirasmos" in this sense in Revelation 3:10. Others see it as a plea against hard tests described elsewhere in scripture, such as those of Job. (Note: Psalm 26:2 and Psalm 139:23 are respectful challenges for a test to prove the writer's innocence and integrity.) It is also read as: "Do not let us be led (by ourselves, by others, by Satan) into temptations". Tertullian comments: "For the completeness of so brief a prayer He added — in order that we should supplicate not touching the remitting merely, but touching the entire averting, of acts of guilt — Lead us not into temptation: that is, suffer us not to be led into it, by him (of course) who tempts; but far be the thought that the Lord should seem to tempt, as if He either were ignorant of the faith of any, or else were eager to overthrow it. Infirmity and malice are characteristics of the Devil...The final clause, therefore, is consonant, and interprets the sense of Lead us not into temptation; for this sense is, But convey us away from the Evil One." (On Prayer, Ch. VIII) Coherently, Saint Cyprian of Carthago translates Matthew 6:9 as follows: And suffer us not to be led into temptation; but deliver us from evil. (On the Lord's Prayer, n. 7)

Since it follows shortly after a plea for daily bread (i.e., material sustenance), it is also seen as referring to not being caught up in the material pleasures given. A similar phrase appears in Matthew 26:41 and Luke 22:40 in connection with the prayer of Jesus in Gethsemane.

Joseph Smith, the founder of the Latter Day Saint movement, in a version of the Holy Bible which was not published before his death, used: "And suffer us not to be led into temptation".

In a conversation on the Italian TV channel TV2000 on 6 December 2017, Pope Francis commented that the then Italian wording of this petition (similar to the traditional English) was a poor translation. He said "the French" (i.e., the Bishops' Conference of France) had changed the petition to "Do not let us fall in/into temptation". He was referring to the 2017 change to a new French version, Et ne nous laisse pas entrer en tentation ("Do not let us enter into temptation"), but spoke of it in terms of the Spanish translation, no nos dejes caer en la tentación ("do not let us fall in/into temptation"), that he was accustomed to recite in Argentina before his election as Pope. He explained: "I am the one who falls; it's not him [God] pushing me into temptation to then see how I have fallen". Anglican theologian Ian Paul said that such a proposal was "stepping into a theological debate about the nature of evil".

In January 2018, after "in-depth study", the German Bishops' Conference rejected any rewording of their translation of the Lord's Prayer.

In November 2018, the Episcopal Conference of Italy adopted a new edition of the Messale Romano, the Italian translation of the Roman Missal. One of the changes made from the older (1983) edition was to render this petition as non abbandonarci alla tentazione ("do not abandon us to temptation"). This was approved by Pope Francis; however, there are no current plans to make a similar change for the English translation as of 2019. The Italian-speaking Union of Methodist and Waldensian Churches maintains its translation of the petition: non esporci alla tentazione ("do not expose us to temptation").

=== Seventh Petition ===
But deliver us from evil:

Translations and scholars are divided over whether the final word here refers to "evil" in general or "the evil one" (the devil) in particular. In the original Greek, as well as in the Latin translation, the word could be either of neuter (evil in general) or masculine (the evil one) gender. Matthew's version of the prayer appears in the Sermon on the Mount, in earlier parts of which the term is used to refer to general evil. Later parts of Matthew refer to the devil when discussing similar issues. However, the devil is never referred to as the evil one in any known Aramaic sources. While John Calvin accepted the vagueness of the term's meaning, he considered that there is little real difference between the two interpretations, and that therefore the question is of no real consequence. Similar phrases are found in John 17:15 and Thessalonians 3:3.

=== Doxology ===
For thine is the kingdom, the power, and the glory,
For ever and ever. Amen.

==== Content ====
The doxology sometimes attached to the prayer in English is similar to a passage in 1 Chronicles 29:11 – "Yours, O LORD, is the greatness and the power and the glory and the victory and the majesty, for all that is in the heavens and in the earth is yours. Yours is the kingdom, O LORD, and you are exalted as head above all." It is also similar to the paean to King Nebuchadnezzar of Babylon in Daniel 2:37 – "You, O king, the king of kings, to whom the God of heaven has given the kingdom, the power, and the might, and the glory".

The doxology has been interpreted as connected with the final petition: "Deliver us from evil". The kingdom, the power and the glory are the Father's, not of our antagonist's, who is subject to him to whom Christ will hand over the kingdom after he has destroyed all dominion, authority and power (1 Corinthians 15:24). It makes the prayer end as well as begin with the vision of God in heaven, in the majesty of his name and kingdom and the perfection of his will and purpose.

==== Origin ====
The doxology is not included in Luke's version of the Lord's Prayer, nor is it present in the earliest manuscripts (papyrus or parchment) of Matthew, representative of the Alexandrian text, although it is present in the manuscripts representative of the later Byzantine text. Most scholars do not consider it part of the original text of Matthew. The Codex Washingtonianus, which adds a doxology (in the familiar text), is of the early fifth or late fourth century. New translations generally omit it except as a footnote.

The Didache, generally considered a first-century text, has a doxology, "for yours is the power and the glory forever", as a conclusion for the Lord's Prayer (Didache, 8:2). C. Clifton Black, although regarding the Didache as an "early second century" text, nevertheless considers the doxology it contains to be the "earliest additional ending we can trace". Of a longer version, (Note: "For yours is the kingdom and the power and the glory unto the ages. Amen. (AT) [emphasis in original]") Black observes: "Its earliest appearance may have been in Tatian's Diatessaron, a second-century harmony of the four Gospels". The first three editions of the United Bible Societies text cited the Diatessaron for inclusion of the familiar doxology in Matthew 6:13, but in the later editions it cites the Diatessaron for excluding it. The Apostolic Constitutions added "the kingdom" to the beginning of the formula in the Didache, thus establishing the now familiar doxology.

==== Varied liturgical use ====
In the Byzantine Rite, whenever a priest is officiating, after the last line of the prayer he intones the doxology, "For thine is the kingdom and the power and the glory: of the Father, and of the Son, and of the Holy Spirit, now and ever, and unto ages of ages.", (Note: In Greek: Ὅτι σοῦ ἐστὶν ἡ βασιλεία καὶ ἡ δύναμις καὶ ἡ δόξα· τοῦ Πατρὸς καὶ τοῦ Υἱοῦ καὶ τοῦ Ἁγίου Πνεύματος· νῦν καὶ ἀεὶ καὶ εἰς τοὺς αἰῶνας τῶν αἰώνων.) and in either instance, reciter(s) of the prayer reply "Amen".

Adding a doxology directly following the Our Father is not part of the liturgical tradition of the Roman Rite nor does the Latin Vulgate of St. Jerome contain the doxology that appears in late Greek manuscripts. However, it is recited since 1970 in the Roman Rite Order of Mass, not as part of the Lord's Prayer but separately as a response acclamation after the embolism developing the seventh petition in the perspective of the Final Coming of Christ.

In most Anglican editions of the Book of Common Prayer, the Lord's Prayer ends with the doxology unless it is preceded by the Kyrie eleison. This happens at the daily offices of Morning Prayer (Mattins) and Evening Prayer (Evensong) and in a few other offices. (Note: For instance, in Morning Prayer the doxology is included in the Lord's Prayer in the Introduction, but not in the Prayers after the Apostles' Creed because it is preceded by the Kyrie eleison.)

The vast majority of Protestant churches conclude the Lord's Prayer with the doxology.

== Use as a language comparison tool ==
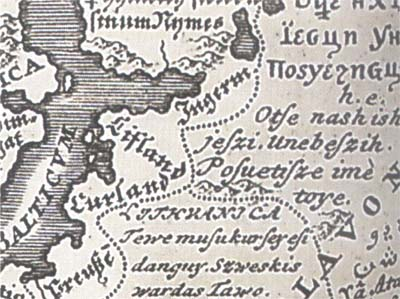
Detail of the Europa Polyglotta published with Synopsis Universae Philologiae in 1741; the map gives the first phrase of the Lord's Prayer in 33 different languages of Europe

In the course of Christianization, one of the first texts to be translated between many languages has historically been the Lord's Prayer, long before the full Bible would be translated into the respective languages. Since the 16th century, collections of translations of the prayer have often been used for a quick comparison of languages. The first such collection, with 22 versions, was Mithridates, de differentiis linguarum by Conrad Gessner (1555; the title refers to Mithridates VI of Pontus who according to Pliny the Elder was an exceptional polyglot).

Gessner's idea of collecting translations of the prayer was taken up by authors of the 17th century, including Hieronymus Megiserus (1603) and Georg Pistorius (1621). Andreas Müller (Orientalist) in 1680 published an enlarged collection of 82 versions of the prayer, under the pseudonym 'Thomas Ludekenius', of which three were in fictional philosophical languages. In 1700, Müller's collection was re-edited by B. Mottus as Oratio dominica plus centum linguis versionibus aut characteribus reddita et expressa. This edition was comparatively inferior, but a second, revised edition was published in 1715 by John Chamberlayne. This 1715 edition was used by Gottfried Hensel in his Synopsis Universae Philologiae (1741) to compile "geographico-polyglot maps" where the beginning of the prayer was shown in the geographical area where the respective languages were spoken. Johann Ulrich Kraus also published a collection with more than 100 entries.

These collections continued to be improved and expanded well into the 19th century; Johann Christoph Adelung and Johann Severin Vater in 1806–1817 published the prayer in "well-nigh five hundred languages and dialects".

Samples of scripture, including the Lord's Prayer, were published in 52 Asian languages, most of them not previously found in such collections, translated by the brethren of the Serampore Mission and printed at the mission press there in 1818.

== Catholic indulgences ==
During the 2020–2021 jubilee of Saint Joseph, Pope Francis signed a decree that granted a plenary indulgence to those who shall contemplate the Lord's Prayer for at least 30 minutes.

== Comparisons with other prayer traditions ==
The book The Comprehensive New Testament, by T. E. Clontz and J. Clontz, points to similarities between elements of the Lord's Prayer and expressions in writings of other religions as diverse as the Dhammapada, the Epic of Gilgamesh, the Golden Verses, and the Egyptian Book of the Dead. It mentions in particular parallels in 1 Chronicles 29:10-18.

Rabbi Aron Mendes Chumaceiro says that nearly all the elements of the prayer have counterparts in the Jewish Bible and Deuterocanonical books: the first part in Isaiah 63:15-16 ("Look down from heaven and see, from your holy and beautiful habitation... for you are our Father") and Ezekiel 36:23 ("I will vindicate the holiness of my great name...") and 38:23 ("I will show my greatness and my holiness and make myself known in the eyes of many nations..."), the second part in Obadiah 1:21 ("Saviours shall go up to Mount Zion to rule Mount Esau, and the kingdom shall be the LORD's") and 1 Samuel 38:18 ("...It is the LORD. Let him do what seems good to him."), the third part in Proverbs 30:8 ("...feed me with my apportioned bread..."), and the fourth part in Book of Sirach 28:2 ("Forgive your neighbour the wrong he has done, and then your sins will be pardoned when you pray."). "Deliver us from evil" can be compared with Psalm 119:133 ("...let no iniquity get dominion over me.").

Chumaceiro says that, because the idea of God leading a human into temptation contradicts the righteousness and love of God, "Lead us not into temptation" has no counterpart in the Jewish Bible/Christian Old Testament. However, the word "πειρασμός", which is translated as "temptation", can also be translated as "test" or "trial", making evident the attitude of someone's heart, and in the Old Testament God tested Abraham, and told David, "Go, number Israel and Judah," an action that David later acknowledged as sin; and the testing of Job in the Book of Job.

Reuben Bredenhof says that the various petitions of the Lord's Prayer, as well as the doxology attached to it, have a conceptual and thematic background in the Old Testament Book of Psalms.

On the other hand, Andrew Wommack says that the Lord's Prayer "technically speaking... isn't even a true New Testament prayer". The only evidence or argument he offers readers, however, is to "notice that it's not prayed in the name of Jesus."

In post-biblical Jewish prayer, especially Kiddushin 81a (Babylonian). "Our Father which art in heaven" (אבינו שבשמים, Avinu shebashamayim) is the beginning of many Hebrew prayers. "Our Father who art in heaven" and "hallowed be thy name" are reflected in the Kaddish (where it says: "May His great name be hallowed in the world which He created, according to His will, and may He establish His Kingdom...)". "Lead us not into sin" is echoed in the "morning blessings" of Jewish prayer. A blessing said by some Jewish communities after the evening Shema includes a phrase quite similar to the opening of the Lord's Prayer: "Our God in heaven, hallow thy name, and establish thy kingdom forever, and rule over us for ever and ever. Amen." None of these liturgical prayers, however, can be dated to before Jesus Christ.

== Musical settings ==
Various composers have incorporated the Lord's Prayer into a musical setting for utilization during liturgical services for a variety of religious traditions as well as interfaith ceremonies. Included among them are:

- 9th–10th century: Gregorian chant
- 1565: Robert Stone – The Lord's Prayer
- 1573: Orlando di Lasso – Pater Noster a4
- 1592: John Farmer – The Lord's Prayer
- 1625: Heinrich Schütz – Pater Noster
- 1783: William Billings – "Kittery" (words from Tate and Brady)
- 180?: Artemy Vedel - Otche Nash (Otche nash; from Liturgy) and separate work, ta okremyy pisnespiv
- 1854: Josef Rheinberger – Vater Unser
- 1878: Pyotr Ilyich Tchaikovsky – Otche Nash (Отче наш; Liturgy of St. John Chrysostom, op. 41)
- 1883: Nikolai Rimsky-Korsakov – Otche Nash
- 1906: Leoš Janáček – Otče náš
- 1910: Sergei Rachmaninoff – Otche Nash (Отче наш; Liturgy of St. John Chrysostom, op. 31)
- 1910: Kyrylo Stetsenko - Otche Nash (Отче наш; from Liturgy)
- 1919: Mykola Leontovych - Otche Nash (Отче наш; Liturgy of St. John Chrysostom)
- 1919: Emil von Reznicek – "Vater Unser im Himmel" (A Choral Fantasy with Mixed Chorus and Organ)
- 1926: Igor Stravinsky – Otche Nash (Church Slavonic), arr. Pater Noster (Latin, c. 1949)
- 1935: Albert Hay Malotte – "The Lord's Prayer"
- 1973: Arnold Strals – "The Lord's Prayer" (performed by Janet Mead)
- 1975: Mark Alburger – The Lord's Prayer, op. 5
- 1976: Maurice Duruflé – Notre Père
- 1992: John Serry Sr. – The Lord's Prayer for Organ & Chorus
- 1999: Paul Field and Stephen Deal – "The Millennium Prayer" (performed by Cliff Richard)
- 2000: John Tavener – "The Lord's Prayer"
- 2005: Christopher Tin — "Baba Yetu"

== In popular culture ==
As with other prayers, the Lord's Prayer was used by cooks to time their recipes before the spread of clocks. For example, a step could be "simmer the broth for three Lord's Prayers".

American songwriter and arranger Brian Wilson set the text of the Lord's Prayer to an elaborate close-harmony arrangement loosely based on Malotte's melody. Wilson's group, The Beach Boys, would return to the piece several times throughout their recording career, most notably as the B-side to their 1964 single "Little Saint Nick." The band Yazoo used the prayer interspersed with the lyrics of "In My Room" on the album Upstairs at Eric's.

In the 2002 film Spider-Man, Norman Osborn, as the Green Goblin, attacks and injures Aunt May while she is in the middle of saying the Lord's Prayer, causing her hospitalization.

Beat Generation poet Lawrence Ferlinghetti wrote and performed a "Loud Prayer" parodying the Lord's Prayer, one version of which was featured in the 1978 film The Last Waltz.

In July 2023, Filipino drag queen and former Drag Den contestant Pura Luka Vega drew controversy online for posting a video of themselves dressing up as Jesus Christ and dancing to a punk rock version of Ama Namin, the Filipino version of the Lord's Prayer. The video was also condemned by several Philippine politicians and the Catholic Bishops' Conference of the Philippines.

On 9 May 2026 a proposal was put forward by the leading Reform UK group at Kent County Council, supported by councillors from Restore Britain, to say The Lord's Prayer at the start of full council meetings. The proposal was debated and approved at a Full Council meeting on 22 May 2026.

== Images ==
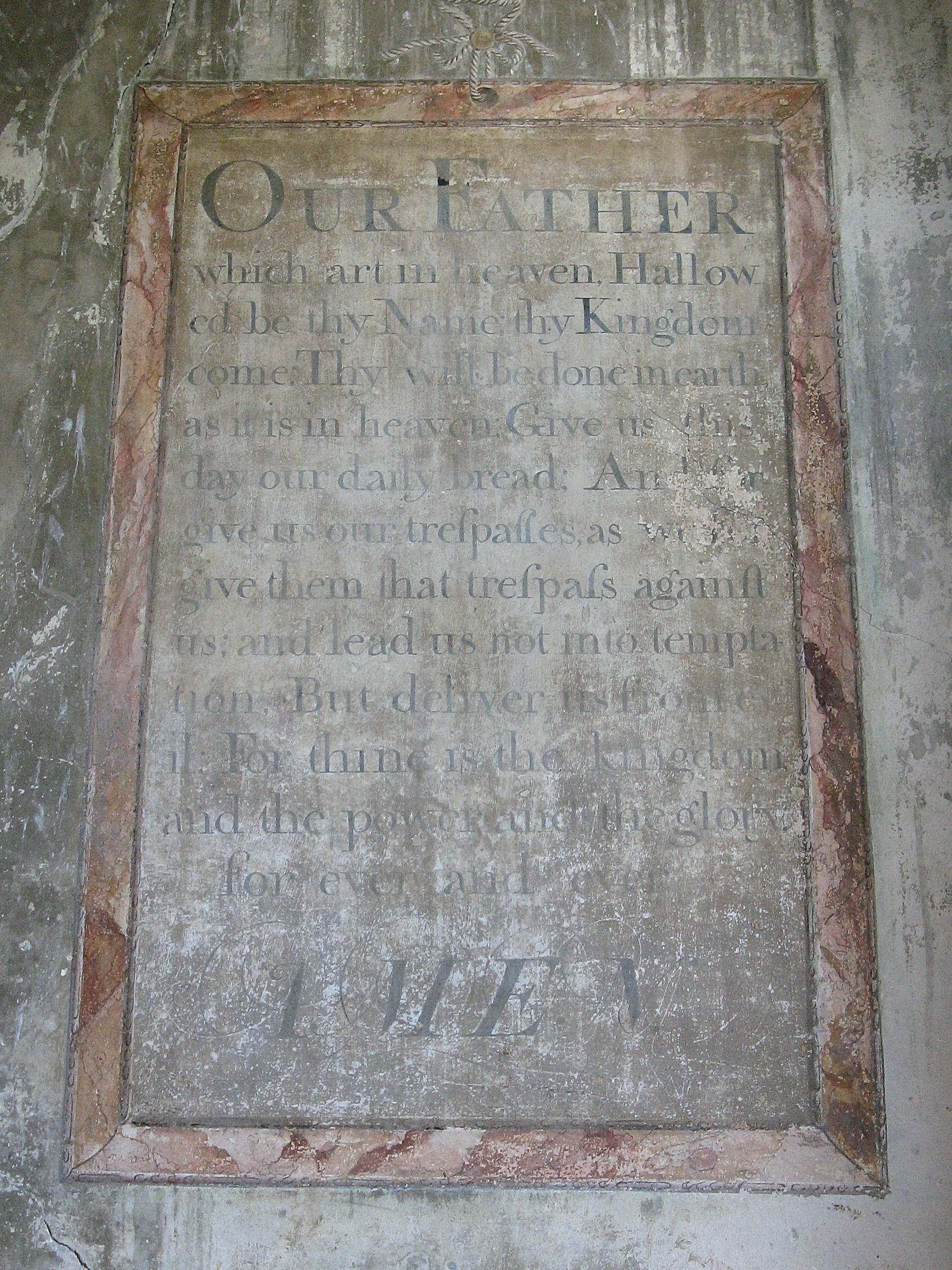
18th-century painting of the Lord's Prayer, on the north side of the chancel of St Mary's Church, Mundon, Essex

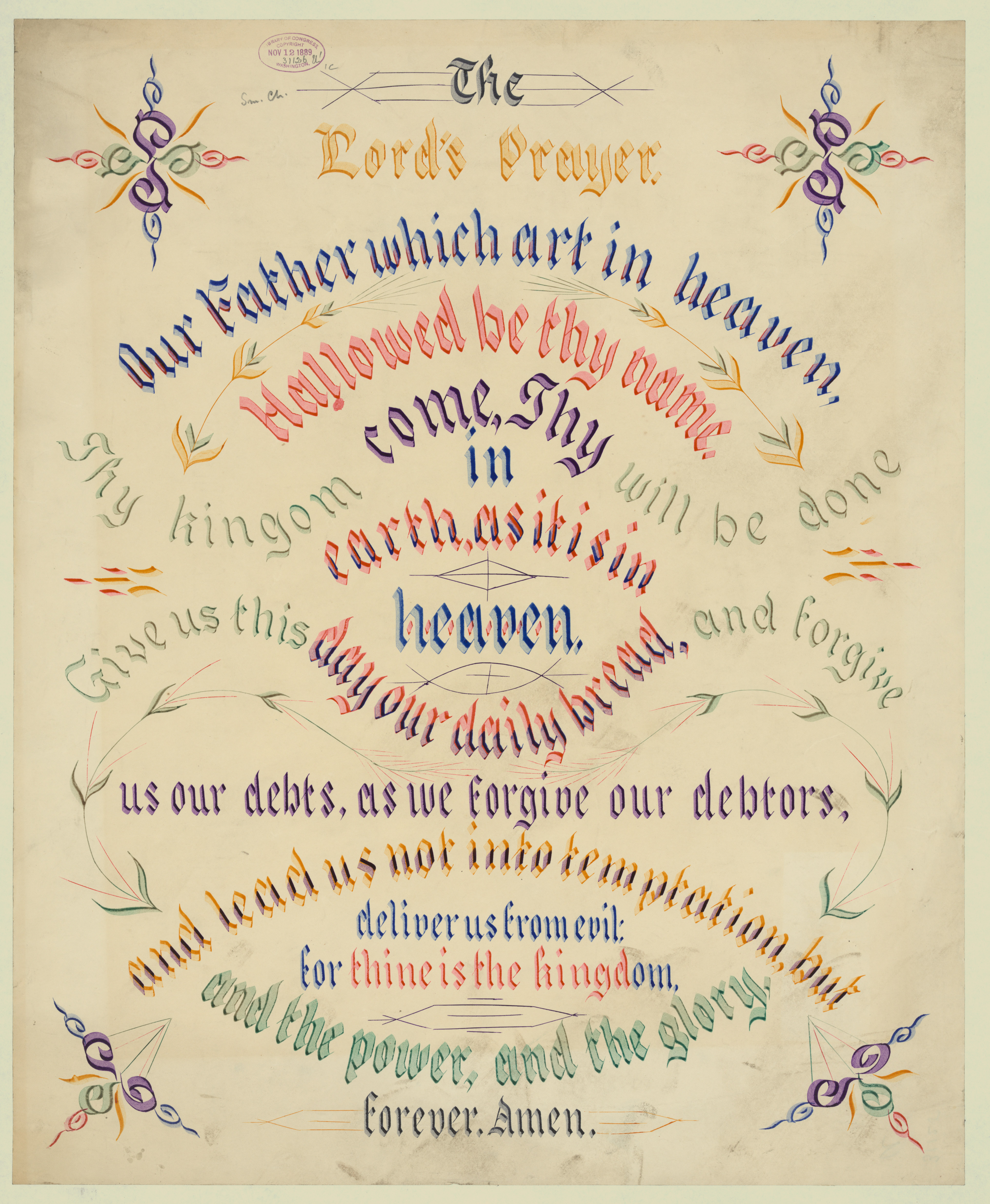
The Lord's Prayer, ink and watercolor by John Morgan Coaley, 1889. Library of Congress.

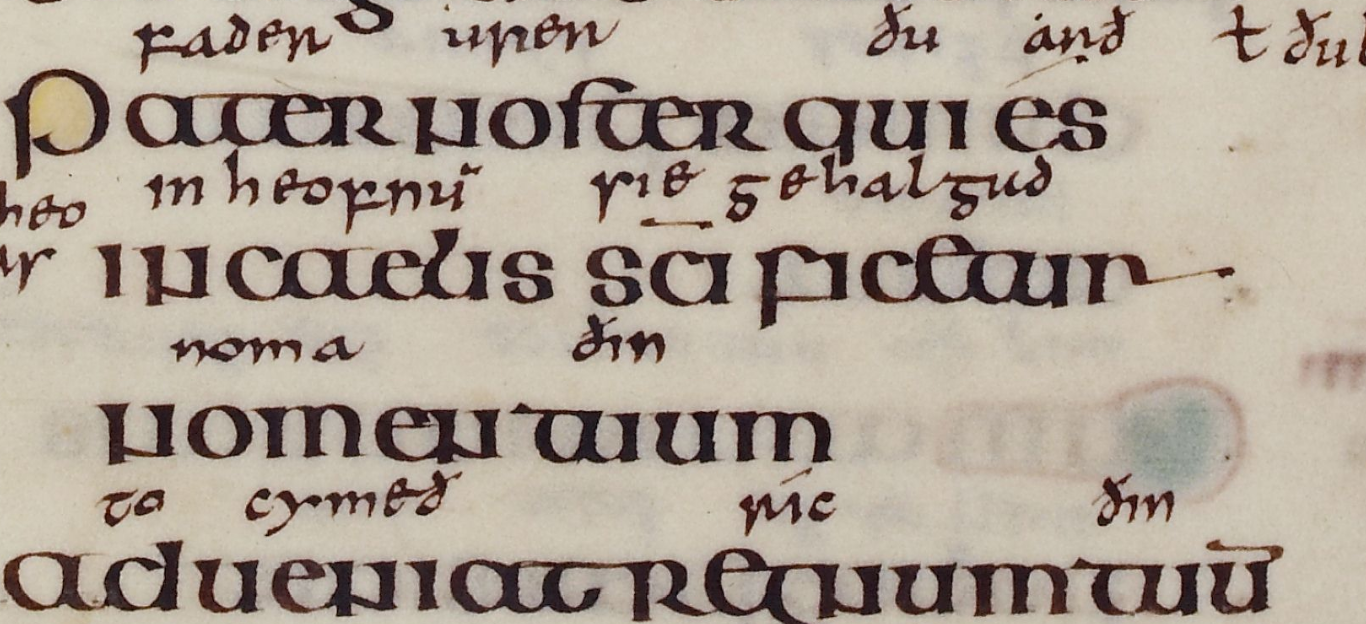
Lord's Prayer fragment from Lindisfarne Gospels, f. 37r, Latin text, translated in Northumbrian dialect of the Old English

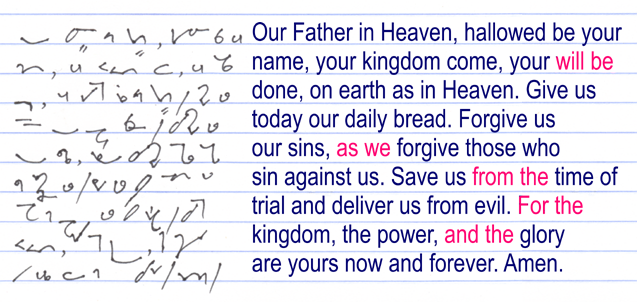
The text of the English Language Liturgical Consultation version of the Lord's Prayer, written in Teeline Shorthand and in Latin script for comparison

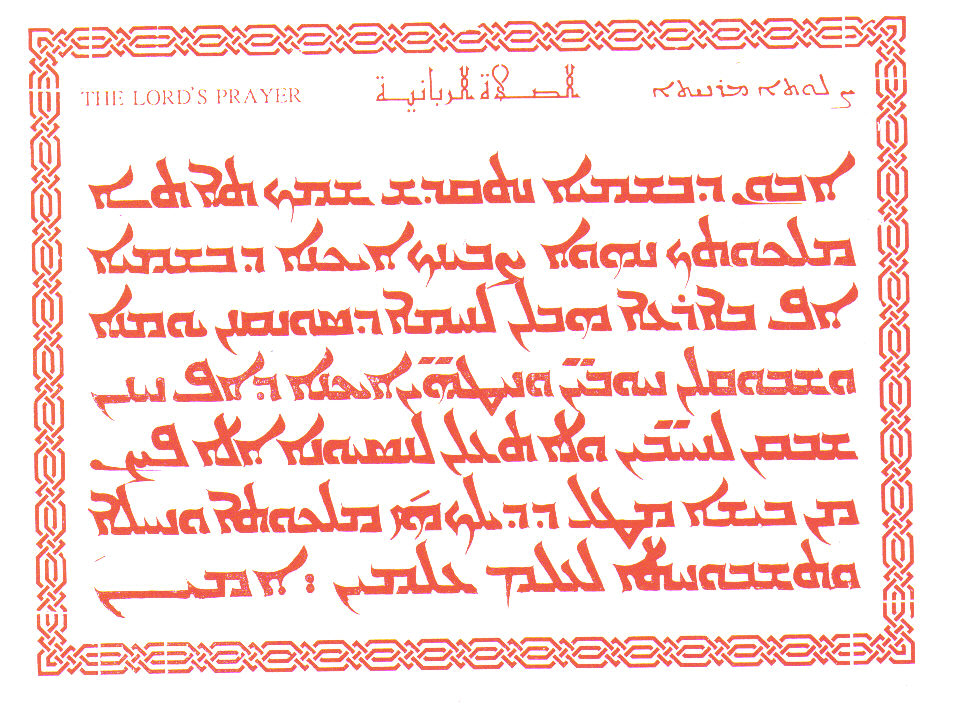
Lord's Prayer written in Syriac

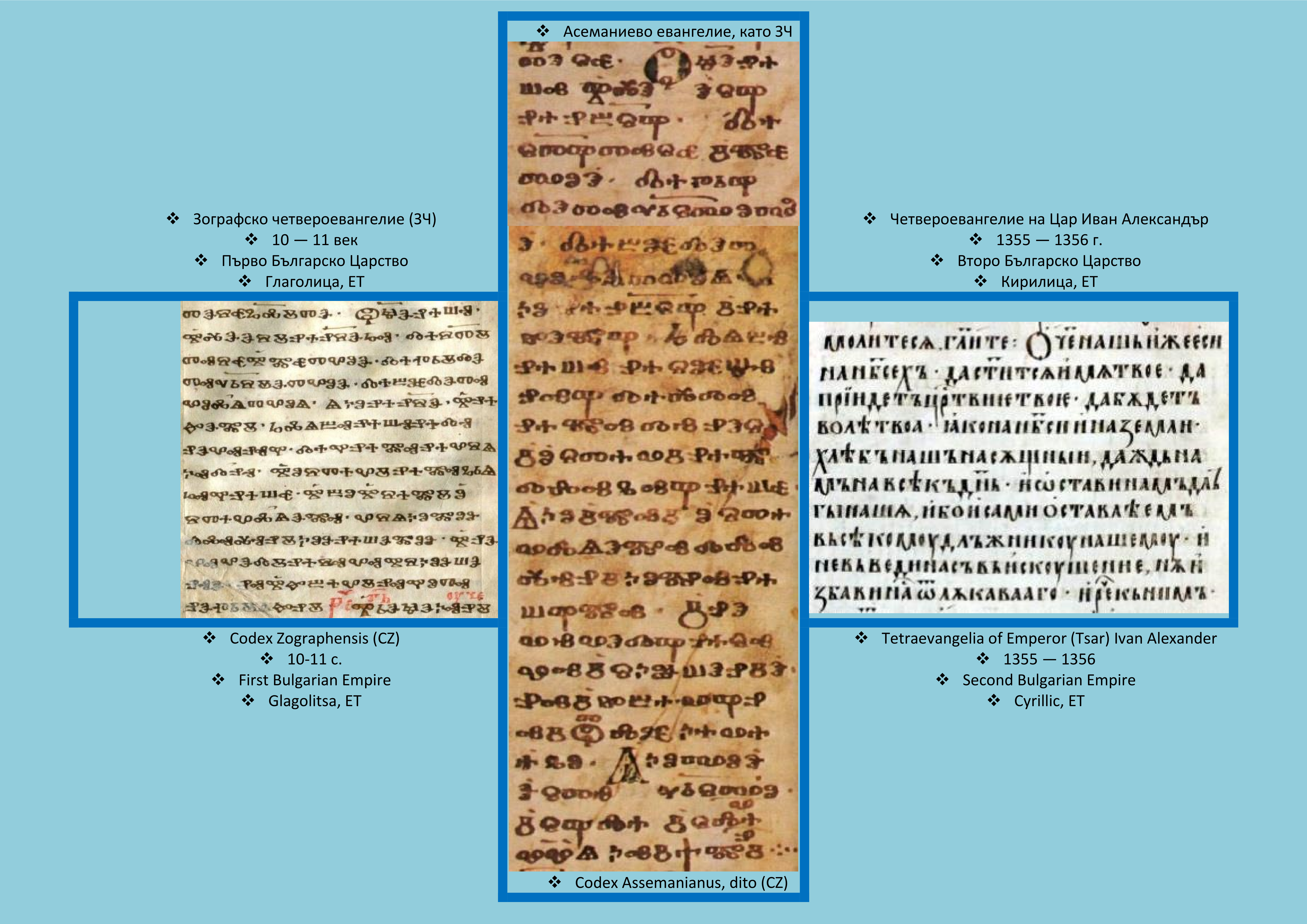
Lord's Prayer, three versions from left to right: (1) from Codex Zographensis in Glagolitic script (1100s); (2) from Codex Assemanius in Glagolitic script (1000s); (3) from Gospels of Tsar Ivan Alexander in Bulgarian Cyrillic script (1355).

== See also ==
- Amen
- Baba Yetu – Theme song of the video game Civilization IV, Lord's Prayer sung in Swahili
- Church of the Pater Noster on the Mount of Olives, Jerusalem
- Discourse on ostentation, a portion of the Sermon on the Mount
- Five Discourses of Matthew
- Hail Mary
- High Priestly Prayer
- Prayer in the New Testament
- Rosary
- Didache, an early book of rituals which mentions saying the prayer three times daily
- Novum Testamentum Graece, the primary source for most contemporary New Testament translations
- Textus Receptus
- List of New Testament verses not included in modern English translations

== Notes ==
Lord's Prayer Life of Jesus: Sermon on the Mount or on the Plain
Preceded by Beatitudes in the Sermon on the Mount	New Testament; Events	Succeeded by The Birds of the Air in the Sermon on the Mount
