= Doxology =

Short hymn of praise to God

A doxology (Ancient Greek: δοξολογία doxologia, from δόξα, doxa 'glory' and -λογία, -logia 'saying') is a short hymn of praises to God in various forms of Christian worship, often added to the end of canticles, psalms, and hymns. The tradition derives from a similar practice in the Jewish synagogue, where a variant of the Kaddish serves to terminate each section of the service.

== Trinitarian doxology ==
Among Christian traditions a doxology is typically an expression of praise sung to the Holy Trinity: the Father, the Son, and the Holy Spirit. It is common in high hymns for the final stanza to take the form of a doxology. Doxologies occur in the Eucharistic prayers, the Liturgy of the Hours, hymns, and various Catholic devotions such as novenas and the Rosary.

=== Gloria in excelsis Deo ===
The Gloria in excelsis Deo, also called the Greater Doxology, is a hymn beginning with the words that the angels sang when the birth of Christ was announced to shepherds in Luke 2:14. Other verses were added very early, forming a doxology.

=== Gloria Patri ===
Gloria Patri setting by Henry Wellington Greatorex
Solo organ recording

The Gloria Patri, so named for its Latin incipit, is commonly used as a doxology in many Christian traditions, including the Roman Catholics, Old Catholics, Independent Catholics, Orthodox, Lutherans, Anglicans, Presbyterians, Methodists, Disciples of Christ, Baptists and United Protestants. It is called the "Lesser Doxology", thus distinguished from the "Great Doxology" (Gloria in Excelsis Deo), and is often called simply "the doxology". As well as praising God, it was regarded as a short declaration of faith in the equality of the three Persons of the Holy Trinity.

The Greek text,

Δόξα Πατρὶ καὶ Υἱῷ καὶ Ἁγίῳ Πνεύματι
καὶ νῦν καὶ ἀεὶ καὶ εἰς τοὺς αἰῶνας τῶν αἰώνων. Ἀμήν.

is rendered into Latin as,

Gloria Patri, et Filio, et Spiritui Sancto. Sicut erat in principio, et nunc, et semper, et in saecula saeculorum. Amen.

which is literally translated

Glory [be] to the Father, and to the Son, and to the Holy Spirit.
As it was in the beginning, and now, and always, and into the ages of ages. Amen.

"In saecula saeculorum", here rendered "ages of ages", is the calque of what was probably a Semitic idiom, via Koine Greek, meaning "forever". It is also rendered "world without end" in English, an expression also used in James I's Authorised Version of the Bible in Ephesians 3:21 and Isaiah 45:17. Similarly, "et semper" is often rendered "and ever shall be", thus giving the more metrical English version,

... As it was in the beginning, is now and ever shall be, world without end. Amen.

A common version of the Liturgy of the Hours, as approved by the U.S. Conference of Catholic Bishops, uses a newer, different translation for the Latin:

Glory to the Father, and to the Son, and to the Holy Spirit: as it was in the beginning, is now, and will be for ever. Amen.
UPDATED 2026: Glory be to the Father, and to the Son, and to the Holy Spirit. As it was in the beginning, is now, and ever shall be. World without end. Amen.

The most commonly encountered Orthodox English version:

Glory to the Father, and to the Son, and to the Holy Spirit, both now, and ever, and unto the ages of ages. Amen

The modern Anglican version found in Common Worship is slightly different, and is rooted in the aforementioned translations found in the Authorised Version:

Glory be to the Father and to the Son and to the Holy Spirit; as it was in the beginning is now and ever shall be, world without end. Amen.

=== "Praise God, from whom all blessings flow" ===
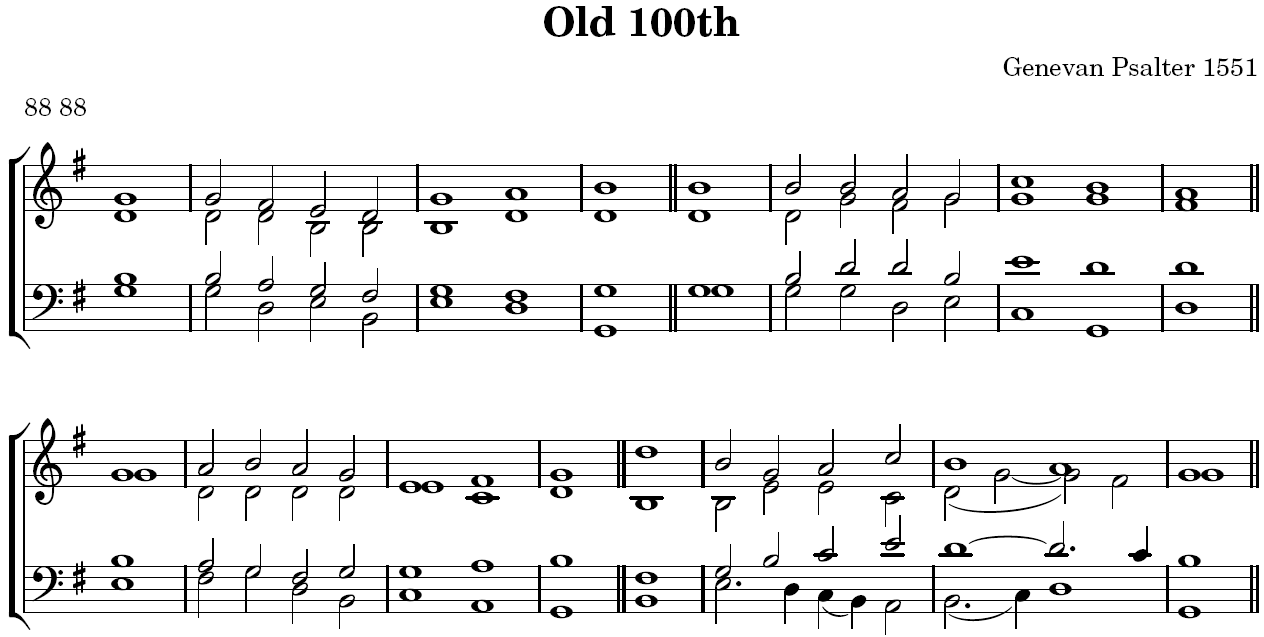
Old 100th

Another doxology in widespread use in English, in some Protestant traditions commonly referred to simply as The Doxology or The Common Doxology, begins "Praise God, from whom all blessings flow". The words are thus:

Praise God, from whom all blessings flow;
Praise Him, all creatures here below;
Praise Him above, ye heavenly host;
Praise Father, Son, and Holy Ghost. Amen.

These words were written in 1674 by Thomas Ken as the final verse of two hymns, "Awake, my soul, and with the sun" and "Glory to thee, my God, this night", intended for morning and evening worship at Winchester College. This final verse, separated from its original hymns and sung to the tune "Old 100th", "Duke Street", "Lasst uns erfreuen", "The Eighth Tune" by Thomas Tallis, among others, frequently marks the dedication of alms or offerings at Sunday worship.

The traditional version of the Doxology is recited in most congregations of the Methodist churches, such as the Free Methodist Church and Global Methodist Church. The popular Hawaiian version Hoʻonani i ka Makua mau was translated by Hiram Bingham I and is published in hymnals. Many Mennonite congregations sing a longer and more embellished setting of this text known as "Dedication Anthem" by Samuel Stanley. In Mennonite circles, this doxology is commonly known as "606" for its hymn number in The Mennonite Hymnal [1969], and colloquially known as the "Mennonite National Anthem". Students at Goshen College stand and sing the Doxology when 6:06 remains in a soccer game – as long as Goshen is winning the game.

Some progressive denominations have adopted altered versions of the Doxology in the interest of inclusive language or other considerations. For example, some Disciples of Christ congregations eliminate the masculine pronouns. Some denominations, such as the Anglican Church of Canada (Common Praise), the United Church of Canada (Voices United), and the United Church of Christ (New Century Hymnal), replace "heavenly host" with a reference to God's love. The United Church of Christ version reads:

Praise God from whom all blessings flow;
Praise God, all creatures here below;
Praise God for all that love has done;
Creator, Christ, and Spirit, One.

The Presbyterian Church (USA) accepted this version of the Doxology for inclusion in the 1990 The Presbyterian Hymnal and the 2014 Glory to God: the Presbyterian Hymnal. This version was written by the Rev. Neil Weatherhogg, pastor of both the First Presbyterian Church of Kerrville, Texas, and the Harvey Browne Presbyterian Church in Louisville, Kentucky. This version maintains gender neutrality as it does not refer to God in gender specific terminology, and reads:

Praise God from whom all blessings flow;
Praise Christ, all people here below;
Praise Holy Spirit evermore;
Praise Triune God, whom we adore.

=== Eucharistic doxology ===
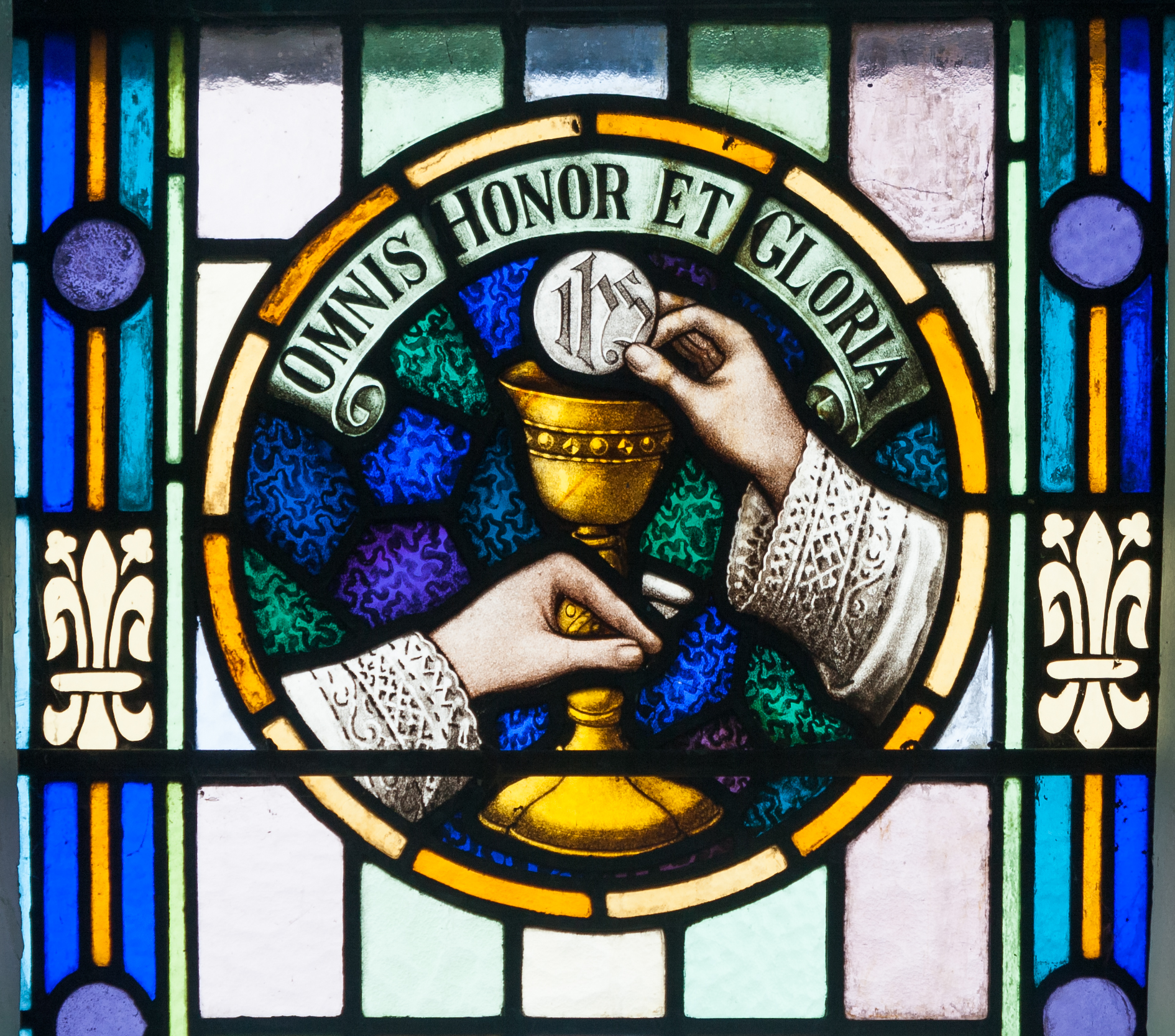
The Eucharistic Doxology in a stained glass window of St. James' in Glenbeigh

In the Catholic Mass a prose doxology concludes the eucharistic prayer, preceding the Our Father. It is typically sung by the presiding priest along with any concelebrating priests. The Latin text reads:

Per ipsum, et cum ipso, et in ipso, est tibi Deo Patri omnipotenti in unitate Spiritus Sancti, omnis honor et gloria per omnia saecula saeculorum. Amen. (1. Through him, with him, in him, in the unity of the Holy Spirit, all glory and honor is yours almighty Father, forever and ever Amen. and 2. Through him, and with him, and in him, O God, almighty Father, in the unity of the Holy Spirit, all glory and honor is yours, forever and ever. Amen.)

The equivalent passage in the Book of Common Prayer (1549) of the Church of England reads:

By whom and with whom, in the unity of the Holy Ghost, all honour and glory be unto thee, O Father almighty, world without end. Amen.

=== Lord's Prayer doxology ===
Another familiar doxology is the one often added at the end of the Lord's Prayer: "For thine is the kingdom, and the power, and the glory, forever and ever, Amen." This is found in manuscripts representative of the Byzantine text of Matthew 6:13, but not in the manuscripts considered by Catholics to be the most reliable. According to Scrivener's "Supplement to the Authorized English version of New Testament", it is omitted by eight out of 500 or so manuscripts. Some scholars do not consider it part of the original text of Matthew, and modern translations do not include it, mentioning it only in footnotes. Since 1970, the doxology, in the form "For the kingdom, the power, and the glory are yours, now and for ever", is used in the Roman Rite of the Mass, after the Embolism. The Catholic Encyclopedia (1914) claims that this doxology "appears in the Greek textus receptus and has been adopted in the later editions of the Book of Common Prayer, [and] is undoubtedly an interpolation". In fact, the Lord's Prayer doxology is often left away by Catholics, such as in the Liturgy of the Hours, or when, which is quite often outside Mass, a Hail Mary follows immediately (e. g. in the Rosary where the Gloria Patri serves as doxology).

According to the Catechism of the Catholic Church, this doxology takes up

the first three petitions to our Father: the glorification of his name, the coming of his reign, and the power of his saving will. But these prayers are now proclaimed as adoration and thanksgiving, as in the liturgy of heaven. The ruler of this world has mendaciously attributed to himself the three titles of kingship, power, and glory. Christ, the Lord, restores them to his Father and our Father, until he hands over the kingdom to him when the mystery of salvation will be brought to its completion and God will be all in all.

== Other doxologies ==
In the Epistle of Jude, the last two verses (24 and 25) are considered to be a doxology and are used by many Protestant Christians, especially in public worship settings:

"Now unto him that is able to keep you from falling, and to present you faultless before the presence of his glory with exceeding joy, To the only wise God our Saviour, be glory and majesty, dominion and power, both now and ever. Amen." (KJV)

At Matins, Orthodox worship specifies a Great Doxology for feast days and a Small Doxology for ordinary days. Both include the Gospel doxology of the angels at Christ's birth (Luke 2:14: "Glory to God in the highest; and on earth peace to men of good will"). The lines of this doxology are the opening lines of the prayer Gloria in Excelsis recited during the Roman Catholic Mass.

=== Pentecostal ===
A popular doxology in African-American Pentecostal and Baptist churches is "Praise Him, Praise Him", written in the 1980s by famed African American Gospel singer and minister Reverend Milton Biggham.

Praise him, praise him, praise him, praise him! Jesus, blessed Savior, he's worthy to be praised.

From the rising of the sun until the going down of the same, he's worthy, Jesus is worthy, he's worthy to be praised.

Glory! Glory! In all things give him glory. Jesus, blessed Savior, he's worthy to be praised.

For God is our rock, hope of salvation; a strong deliverer, in him I will always trust.

Praise him, praise him, praise him, praise him! Jesus, blessed Savior, he's worthy to be praised.

From the rising of the sun until the going down of the same, he's worthy, Jesus is worthy, he's worthy to be praised.

Praise him, praise him, praise him, praise him! Jesus, blessed Savior, he's worthy to be praised.

=== Iglesia ni Cristo ===
In the Iglesia ni Cristo, the Doxology is sung before the Benediction and Concluding Rites during worship services. It reads:

| Tagalog | Official English Text |
|---|---|
| "Purihin natin ang Amá; | "Praise God, our Father up above; |
| Mabuhay sa pag-ibig ng Anák; | Proclaim the love of His beloved Son; |
| Taglayín ang Espíritung Banál; | Receive the Holy Spirit's gift; |
| Ang Dios ay lagì nating sambahín. | Forever worship our Almighty God. |
| Amen" | Amen" |

=== Unitarian Universalism ===
In Unitarian Universalism, "the Doxology" typically refers to Curtis W. Reese's adaptation of "From all that dwell below the skies", an 18th-century paraphrase of Psalm 117 by Isaac Watts:

"From all that dwell below the skies
let songs of hope and faith arise; (Or, alternatively, let faith and hope with love arise)
let peace, goodwill on earth be sung (Or let beauty, truth and good be sung)
through every land, by every tongue." (Or in every land, in every tongue.)

While many congregations who use a doxology use these words and sing them to the tune of Old 100th, there are nine different lyrics that congregations may choose to use, along with three tunes (Old 100th, Tallis' Canon, and Von Himmel Hoch) listed in the Unitarian Universalist hymnal Singing the Living Tradition.

These doxologies appear in Unitarian Universalist services as short songs of communal praise and connection, placed in the service much as Trinitarian doxologies are placed in a Protestant Christian service.

== Derivations ==
Because some Christian worship services include a doxology, and these hymns therefore were familiar and well-practiced among church choirs, the English word sockdolager arose, a deformation of doxology, which came to mean a "show-stopper", a production number. The Oxford English Dictionary considers it a "fanciful" coinage, but an 1893 speculation reported in the Chicago Tribune as to the origin of the word as one of its early attestations:

A writer in the March Atlantic gives this as the origin of the slang word "socdollager", which was current some time ago. "Socdollager" was the uneducated man's transposition of "doxologer", which was the familiar New England rendering of "doxology". This was the Puritan term for the verse ascription used at the conclusion of every hymn, like the "Gloria" at the end of a chanted psalm. On doctrinal grounds it was proper for the whole congregation to join in the singing, so that it became a triumphant winding up of the whole act of worship. Thus is happened that "socdollager" became the term for anything which left nothing else to follow; a decisive, overwhelming finish, to which no reply was possible.

== See also ==
- Greater doxology
