= Embolism (liturgy) =

In Christianity, a short prayer following the Lord's Prayer

The embolism in Christian liturgy (from Greek ἐμβολισμός (embolismos) 'an interpolation') is a short prayer said or sung after the Lord's Prayer. It functions "like a marginal gloss" upon the final petition of the Lord's Prayer (". . . deliver us from evil"), amplifying and elaborating on "the many implications" of that prayer. According to the 1913 Catholic Encyclopedia, "[t]he embolism may date back to the first centuries, since, under various forms, it is found in all the Occidental and in a great many Oriental, particularly Syrian, Liturgies."

== Use in the West ==
=== Mozarabic Rite ===
In the Mozarabic Rite, the embolism is recited not only in the Mass but also after the Our Father at Lauds and Vespers.

=== Roman Rite ===
In the Roman Rite of Mass, the embolism is followed by the doxology or, in the Tridentine Mass (which does not have that doxology), by the Fraction.

In the Mass of the Roman Rite, as revised in 1969, the priest celebrant says or sings:

Libera nos, quæsumus, Domine, ab omnibus malis, da propitius pacem in diebus nostris, ut, ope misericordiæ tuæ adiuti, et a peccato simus semper liberi, et ab omni perturbatione securi: expectantes beatam spem et adventum Salvatoris nostri Iesu Christi.

The current official English translation is:

Deliver us, Lord, we pray, from every evil, graciously grant peace in our days, that, by the help of your mercy, we may be always free from sin and safe from all distress, as we await the blessed hope and the coming of our Saviour, Jesus Christ.

A less literal, more informal English translation used prior to 2011 reads:

Deliver us, Lord, from every evil, and grant us peace in our day. In your mercy keep us free from sin and protect us from all anxiety as we wait in joyful hope for the coming of our Saviour, Jesus Christ.

==== Divine Worship form ====
In the Divine Worship form of the Roman Missal (also called the Ordinariate Form of the Roman Rite), the words are:

Deliver us, O Lord, we beseech thee, from all evils, past, present, and to come; and at the intercession of the blessed and glorious ever-Virgin Mary, Mother of God, with thy blessed Apostles Peter and Paul, and with Andrew, and all the Saints, favourably grant peace in our days, that by the help of thine availing mercy we may ever both be free from sin and safe from all distress.

==== Tridentine form ====
In the Tridentine form of the Roman Missal (also called the Extraordinary Form of the Roman Rite), the embolism, said inaudibly by the priest except for the final phrase, "Per omnia sæcula sæculorum", is:

Líbera nos, quæsumus Dómine, ab ómnibus malis, prætéritis, præséntibus et futúris: et intercedénte beáta et gloriósa semper Vírgine Dei Genitríce María, cum beátis Apóstolis tuis Petro et Páulo, atque Andréa, et ómnibus Sanctis, da propítius pacem in diébus nostris: ut, ope misericórdiæ tuæ adiúti, et a peccáto simus semper líberi et ab omni perturbatióne secúri. Per eúndem Dóminum nostrum Iesum Christum, Fílium tuum. Qui tecum vivit et regnat in unitáte Spíritus Sancti Deus. Per ómnia sæcula sæculórum.

A translation of this is:

Deliver us, we beseech Thee, O Lord, from all evils, past, present and to come, and by the intercession of the Blessed and glorious ever-Virgin Mary, Mother of God, together with Thy blessed apostles Peter and Paul, and Andrew, and all the Saints, mercifully grant peace in our days, that through the bounteous help of Thy mercy we may be always free from sin, and safe from all disquiet. Through the same Jesus Christ, Thy Son our Lord. Who is God living and reigning with Thee in the unity of the Holy Spirit, World without end.

On the Roman Rite embolism in its then-current form, the 1913 Catholic Encyclopedia said:

The Roman Church connects with it a petition for peace in which she inserts the names of the Mother of God, Sts. Peter and Paul, and St. Andrew. The name of St. Andrew is found in the Gelasian Sacramentary, so that its insertion in the Embolismus would seem to have been anterior to the time of St. Gregory. During the Middle Ages the provincial churches and religious orders added the names of other saints, their founders, patrons, etc., according to the discretion of the celebrant.

=== Scottish Episcopal Liturgy ===
An embolism similar in form to the Tridentine can be found in some Anglo-Catholic liturgies of the Scottish Episcopal Church:

Deliver us, O Lord, we beseech thee, from all evils past, present and to come, and at the intercession of the Blessed and glorious ever-Virgin Mary, Mother of God, and of thy blessed saint Peter and Paul, Andrew, [the patron saint of the church, the saint of the day and other saints at the discretion of the celebrant] and all the Saints, favourably grant peace in our days, that by the help of thine availing mercy, we may be evermore both free from sin and safe from all distress.

This is followed by the doxology (For thine is the kingdom...).

== Use in the East ==
=== Coptic Church ===
The rubrics of the Coptic Liturgy of St. Basil state that a deacon says the embolism (which translates as: "through Jesus Christ our Lord") after the words "deliver us from evil". However, it is common practice for the embolism to be said by the entire congregation instead.

=== Greek Church ===
The embolism is not used in the Greek Liturgies of St. Basil and St. John Chrysostom.

In the Liturgy of St. James the English translation of the embolism is as follows:

Lord, lead us not into temptation, Lord of Hosts! for thou dost know our frailty; but deliver us from the wicked one, from all his works, from all his assaults and craftiness; through thy holy name, which we call upon to guard us in our lowliness.
