= Matthew 6:12 =

- ← 6:11 6:13 →
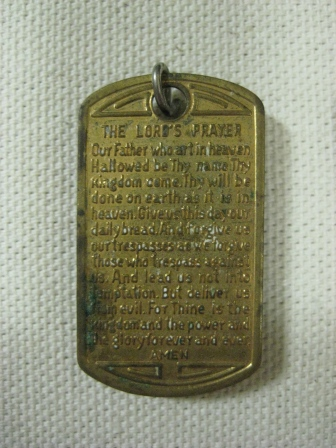
- Lord's Prayer miniature medallion, used on same chain as military ID tag (dog tag).
- Book: Gospel of Matthew
- Christian Bible part: New Testament

Matthew 6:12 is the twelfth verse of the sixth chapter of the Gospel of Matthew in the New Testament and is part of the Sermon on the Mount. This verse is the fourth one of the Lord's Prayer, one of the best known parts of the entire New Testament. This verse contains the fifth petition to God.

The patristic scholar Henry Chadwick says that Matthew 6:12 refers to Sirach 28:2 ("Forgive your neighbor a wrong, and then, when you petition, your sins will be pardoned.").

== Content ==
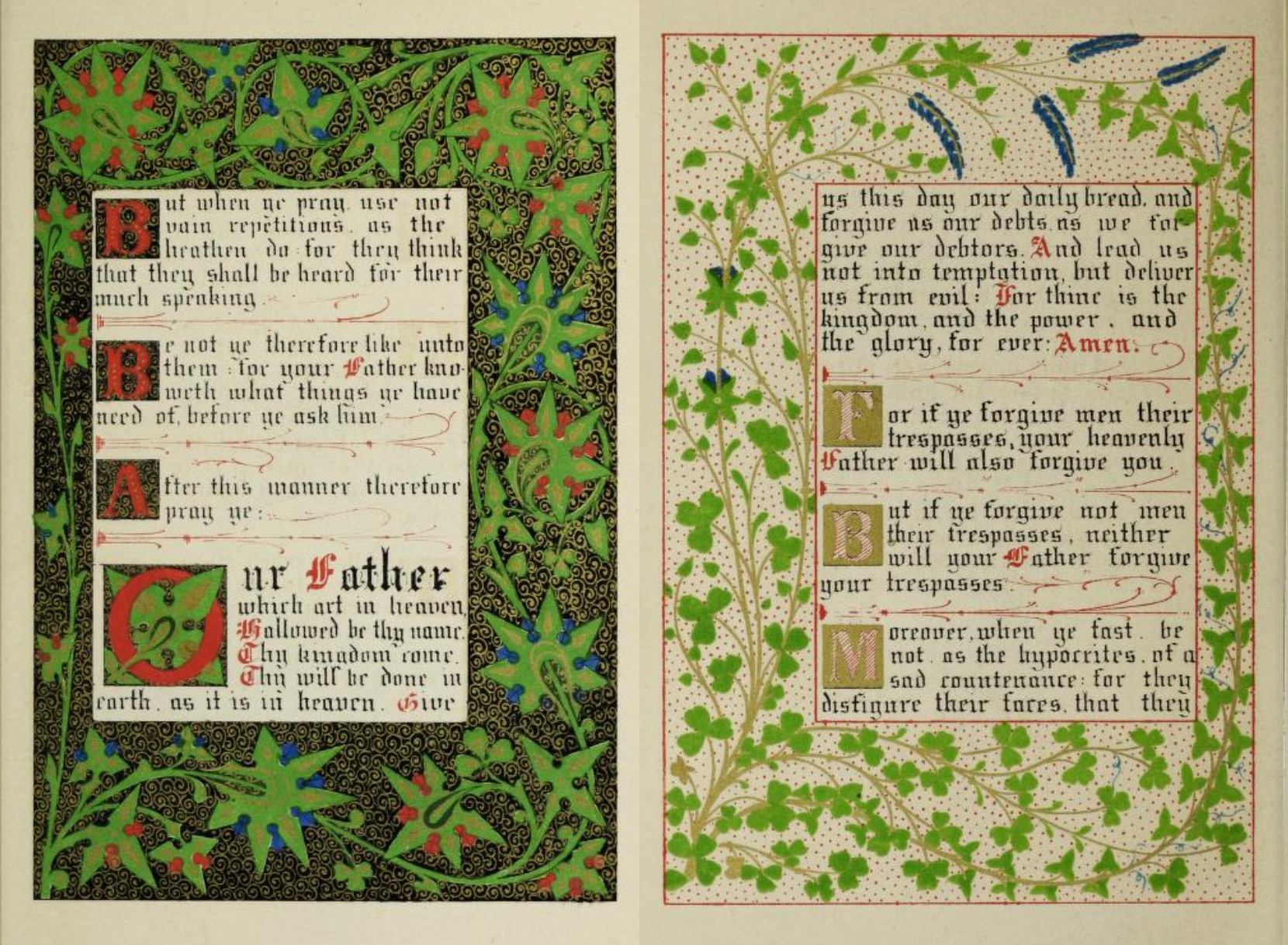
Matthew 6:7–16 from the 1845 illuminated book of The Sermon on the Mount, designed by Owen Jones.

In the King James Version of the Bible the text reads:

And forgive us our debts,
as we forgive our debtors.

The World English Bible translates the passage as:

Forgive us our debts, as
we also forgive our debtors.

The Novum Testamentum Graece text is:

καὶ ἄφες ἡμῖν τὰ ὀφειλήματα ἡμῶν,
ὡς καὶ ἡμεῖς ἀφήκαμεν τοῖς ὀφειλέταις ἡμῶν

For a collection of other versions see BibleHub Matthew 6:12.

== Analysis ==
The Greek word here translated as debts literally meant financial debts owed to another. However, the Aramaic word for debts could also mean sins or errors. In the Gospel of Luke the very similar prayer has the more metaphorical wording. It is thus generally accepted that this verse is talking about sins, rather than loans. This verse has thus often been translated with the word "trespasses" in place of the word debts. However, some groups have read this verse as condemning all forms of lending.

Forgiveness had a central role in the Judaism of the period, and asking for forgiveness from God was a staple of Jewish prayers. It was also considered proper for individuals to be forgiving of others, for mistakes they made. Luz notes that this verse is unique in so closely relating the two notions. To be pious one must forgive one's fellows as God forgives all. This verse presupposes universal sinfulness. Everyone, no matter how holy, has sins that need to be forgiven

The patristic scholar Henry Chadwick says that Matthew 6:12 refers to Sirach 28:2 ("Forgive your neighbor a wrong, and then, when you petition, your sins will be pardoned.").

== Commentary from the Church Fathers ==
Cyprian: After supply of food, next pardon of sin is asked for, that he who is fed of God may live in God, and not only the present and passing life be provided for, but the eternal also; whereunto we may come, if we receive the pardon of our sins, to which the Lord gives the name of debts, as he speaks further on, I forgave thee all that debt, because thou desiredst me. (Mat. 18:32.) How well is it for our need, how provident and saving a thing, to be reminded that we are sinners compelled to make petition for our offences, so that in claiming God's indulgence, the mind is recalled to a recollection of its guilt. That no man may plume himself with the pretence of innocency, and perish more wretchedly through self-exaltation, he is instructed that he commits sin every day by being commanded to pray for his sins.

Augustine: With this weapon the Pelagian heretics received their deathblow, who dare to say that a righteous man is free altogether from sin in this life, and that of such is at this present time composed a Church, having neither spot nor wrinkle.

Chrysostom: That this prayer is meant for the faithful, both the laws of the Church teach, and the beginning of the prayer which instructs us to call God Father. In thus bidding the faithful pray for forgiveness of sin, He shows that even after baptism sin can be remitted

Cyprian: He then who taught us to pray for our sins, has promised us that His fatherly mercy and pardon shall ensue. But He has added a rule besides, binding us under the fixed condition and responsibility, that we are to ask for our sins to be forgiven in such sort as we forgive them that are in debt to us.

Gregory the Great: That good which in our penitence we ask of God, we should first turn and bestow on our neighbour.

Augustine: This is not said of debts of money only, but of all things in which any sins against us, and among these also of money, because that he sins against you, who does not return money due to you, when he has whence he can return it. Unless you forgive this sin you cannot say, Forgive us our debts, as we forgive our debtors.

Pseudo-Chrysostom: With what hope then does he pray, who cherishes hatred against another by whom he has been wronged? As he prays with a falsehood on his lips, when he says, I forgive, and does not forgive, so he asks indulgence of God, but no indulgence is granted him. There are many who, being unwilling to forgive those that trespass against them, will not use this prayer. How foolish! First, because he who does not pray in the manner Christ taught, is not Christ's disciple; and secondly, because the Father does not readily hear any prayer which the Son has not dictated; for the Father knows the intention and the words of the Son, nor will He entertain such petitions as human presumption has suggested, but only those which Christ's wisdom has set forth.

Augustine: Forasmuch as this so great goodness, namely, to forgive debts, and to love our enemies, cannot be possessed by so great a number as we suppose to be heard in the use of this prayer; without doubt the terms of this stipulation are fulfilled, though one have not attained to such proficiency as to love his enemy; yet if when he is requested by one, who has trespassed against him, that he would forgive him, he do forgive him from his heart; for he himself desires to be forgiven then at least when he asks forgiveness. And if one have been moved by a sense of his sin to ask forgiveness of him against whom he has sinned, he is no more to be thought on as an enemy, that there should be anything hard in loving him, as there was when he was in active enmity.

== Bibliography ==
- Fowler, Harold. The Gospel of Matthew: Volume One. Joplin: College Press, 1968
- Hill, David. The Gospel of Matthew. Grand Rapids: Eerdmans, 1981
- Luz, Ulrich. Matthew 1-7: A Commentary. trans. Wilhlem C. Linss. Minneapolis: Augsburg Fortess, 1989.

Preceded by Matthew 6:11	Gospel of Matthew; Chapter 6	Succeeded by Matthew 6:13
