= Teeline shorthand =

English shorthand system

Teeline Shorthand
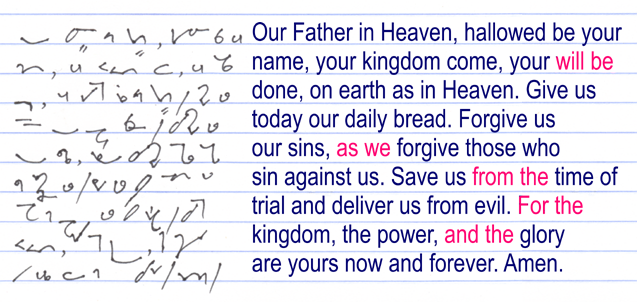
- The Lord's Prayer in Teeline
- Script type: semi-script abjad Stenography
- Creator: James Hill
- Period: 1968–present
- Languages: English

Teeline is a shorthand system developed in 1968 by James Hill, a teacher of Pitman shorthand. It is accepted by the National Council for the Training of Journalists, which certifies the training of journalists in the United Kingdom.

It is mainly used for writing English within the Commonwealth of Nations, but can be adapted for use by other Germanic languages such as German and Swedish. Its strength over other forms of shorthand is fast learning, and speeds of up to 150 words per minute are possible, as it is common for users to create their own word groupings, increasing their speed.

== Writing style ==
Teeline shorthand is a streamlined way to transcribe the spoken word quickly by removing unnecessary letters from words and making the letters themselves faster to write. Vowels are often removed when they are not the first or last letter of a word, and silent letters are also ignored. Common prefixes, suffixes, and letter groupings (such as "sh" and "ing") are reduced to single symbols. The symbols themselves are derived from old cursive forms of the letters, with unnecessary parts removed. Unlike phonetics-based shorthands, such as Pitman, Teeline is a spelling-based system.

== Alphabet ==
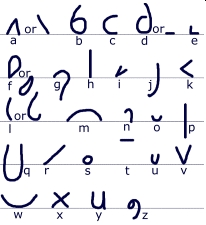
The full alphabet

Teeline differs from many shorthand systems by basing itself on the alphabet as opposed to phonetics, making it simpler to learn but also carrying the speed limitations of the alphabet when compared to other systems. However, it is common to find some phonetics spellings used. For example, ph is often just written as an f, so the word phase would be written as if it were spelt fase. This coincides with the creator's intentions of streamlining it as much as possible. As with many shorthand systems, there are few strict rules on how to write it, so it is common for users to make personal adaptations for their own use. Certain letters also have specific meanings as well as their traditional alphabetic value, as shown in the table below.

Note: there may also be some regional, dialectal, and linguistic additions to these.

Letter	Teeline	Alternate meaning	Notes
A		Form 1: auto, after, able, able to, ability	Can also be used as an outline for "Blood Group A". There is also an indicator A for words ending in "Ang", but indicators can be used for word beginnings.
B		bee, be	Can also be used for "blood group B". It can also be mistaken for a number 6, so all numbers 0–99 are circled
C		Local, locals, because (if below the line)	
D		Do, Day	T & D are parallel lines, but T can be dropped in certain cases. T goes at the top of the line and D goes to the bottom.
E		Electricity	Also used as an indicator for words spelled with "eng"
F		From	
G		Go, Gentleman, Gentlemen	
H		He	Written on the line, so it's not mistaken for a "P"
I		I (singular), Eye	Also used as indicator I and words spelled with "Ing"
J		Gentlemen	Can be given a meaning, Just
K		Kilo, Kind, Like	
L		Letter, Lady, a lot, a lot of	Upwards L can be used as an outline for facilities. Sharp "L" used before a G, M and N, upwards L afterwards.
M		Me, May	
N		And, Non, Nation, National, Begin, Beyond	Begin/Beyond are written below the line but Non, Nation and National are special outlines that use a special N (looking like an upside down Q). Also used in the T position to denote words ending in "ion", such as "junction".
O		Blood, bloodspot, pint of blood, or	Outline for "Blood" derived from blood groups, meaning that A, B and O can be used as an outline for each blood group. Also used as an indicator for words spelt with "ong" and "ology", so sociology would be written as "S,C, disjoined O".
P		Page, Pence, Police	Can be blended with H to form word groupings with "At The post office" or "in the post", "In the Past"
Q		Queen, question, equal	
R		Are, authority	
S		South	
T		to, too	
U		You	Indicator used for words ending in "ung" and beginning in "un"
V		Very, Evidence, evidently	"Evidence" and "Evidently" are written below the line
W		We, way	
X		Accident, accidentally	Can also be used for "Christ", "Christian", etc. Cf. X for "Christ"
Y		Your, Why	
Z		Zoo, Use	Can be replaced with an S
SH		shall, shell	represented as a longhand letter S and can be used in words like "special" or "social".
CH		Chair(man/woman)	
TH		The, Thousand(s)	Can be used in word groupings like "At The", "in The", etc., by putting the "At" or "in" in the T position.

== Writing technique ==
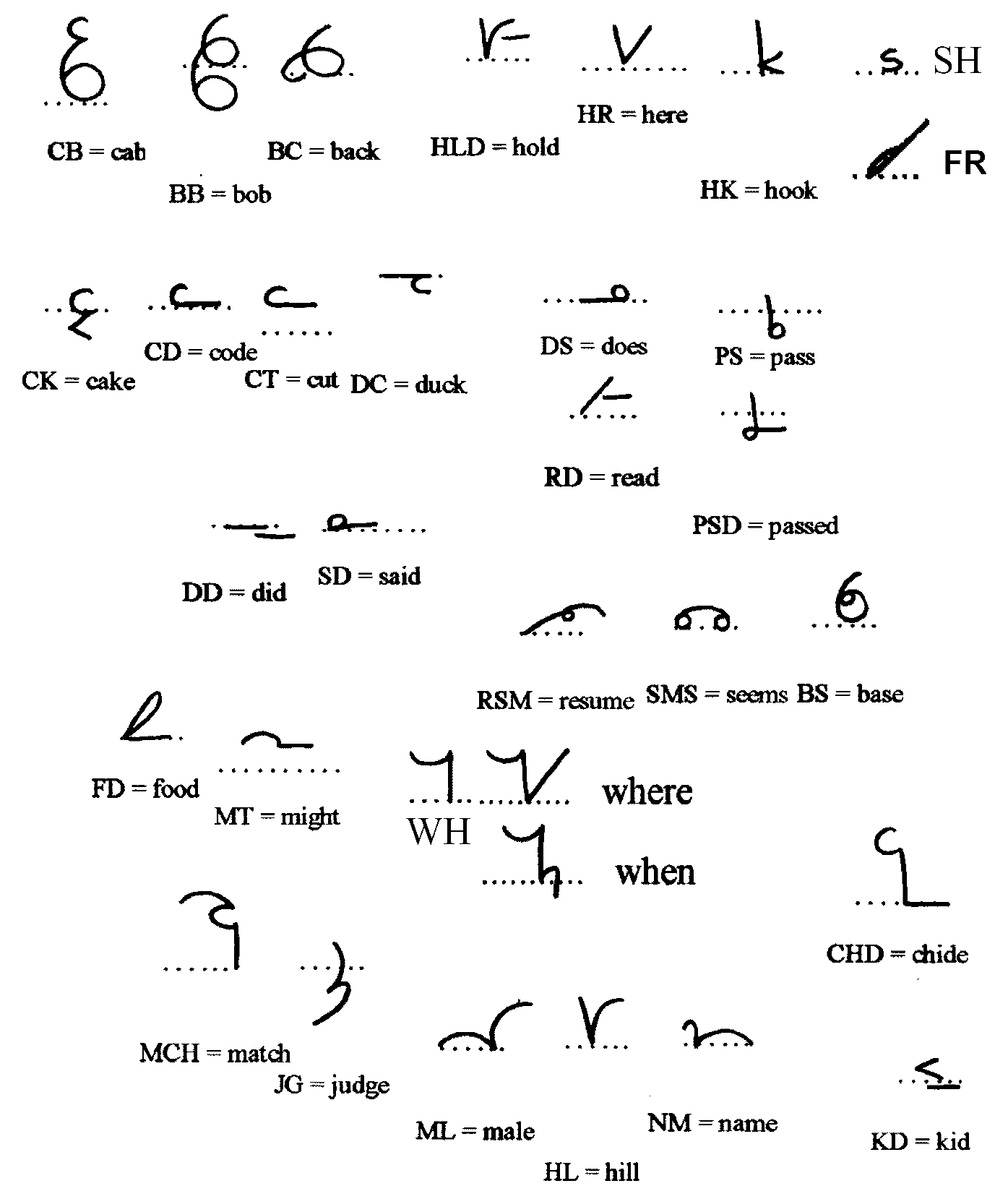
Examples of various words that can be made through combinations of letters.

It is possible to write most words using basic Teeline theory, which consists of the alphabet and vowel indicators, but learning advanced Teeline theory allows users to increase their speed to well in excess of 100 words per minute.

Examples of Teeline theory include blending of letters (such as CM, CN and PL) and the R principle.

Doubling is also commonly used in Teeline - this involves lengthening the outlines for D, T, L, M and W to indicate that an R comes after these outlines - for example, the "D" outline becomes "DR" when it is lengthened, and "M" becomes "MR".

Speed can be dramatically increased through the use of reduced suffixes and prefixes that occur frequently, such as "under-", "multi-" and "trans-", along with "-nce", "-nch", "-able" and "-ing".

== Adaptations ==
Although Teeline is used primarily in English, it has been adapted to other languages in the past, namely Welsh, French, German, and Spanish.

== Notable users ==
Alastair Campbell used Teeline to write his diaries while serving as spokesman for UK Prime Minister Tony Blair. He has claimed to have 120 wpm ability. Campbell's tutor later reported that he was first in his class, reaching 100 wpm before others. But journalist and media commentator Roy Greenslade has questioned the value of shorthand in the digital era, noting an instance where a reporter's scrawl could not be read by a court-appointed expert.

== In popular culture ==
Teeline appears on the cover of the album The Gaelic Chronicles by The Budapest Café Orchestra. Fiddler Christian Garrick said he was astounded to find a reporter using shorthand during an interview, and asked her to scrawl the words for the album cover.
