= Matthew 6:8 =

- ← 6:7 6:9 →
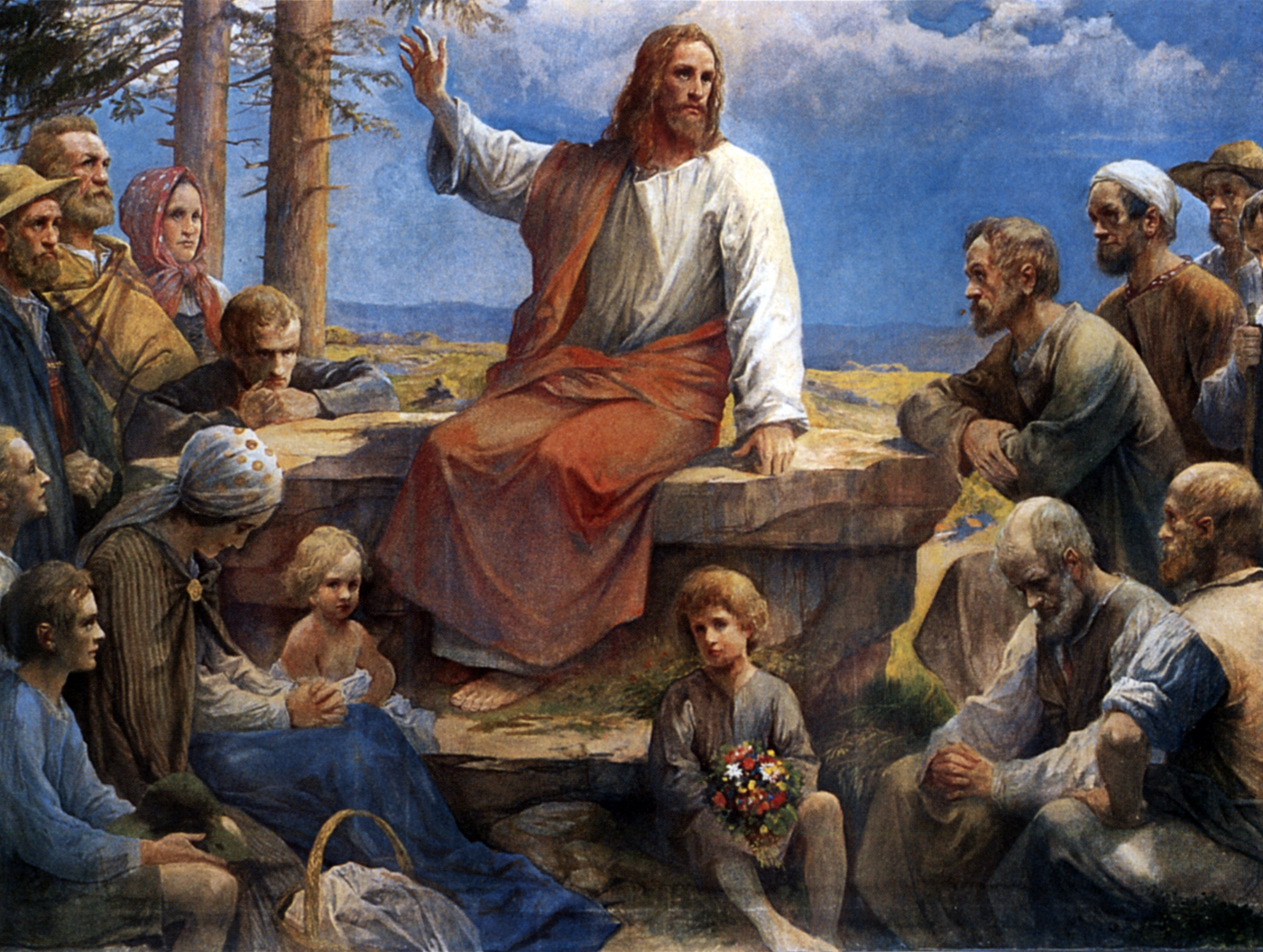
- "The Sermon on the Mount" by Rudolf Yelin (1864-1940). Kirche in Reinerzau im Schwarzwald (1912).
- Book: Gospel of Matthew
- Christian Bible part: New Testament

Matthew 6:8 is the eighth verse of the sixth chapter of the Gospel of Matthew in the New Testament and is part of the Sermon on the Mount. This verse continues the discussion on the proper procedure for praying.

== Content ==
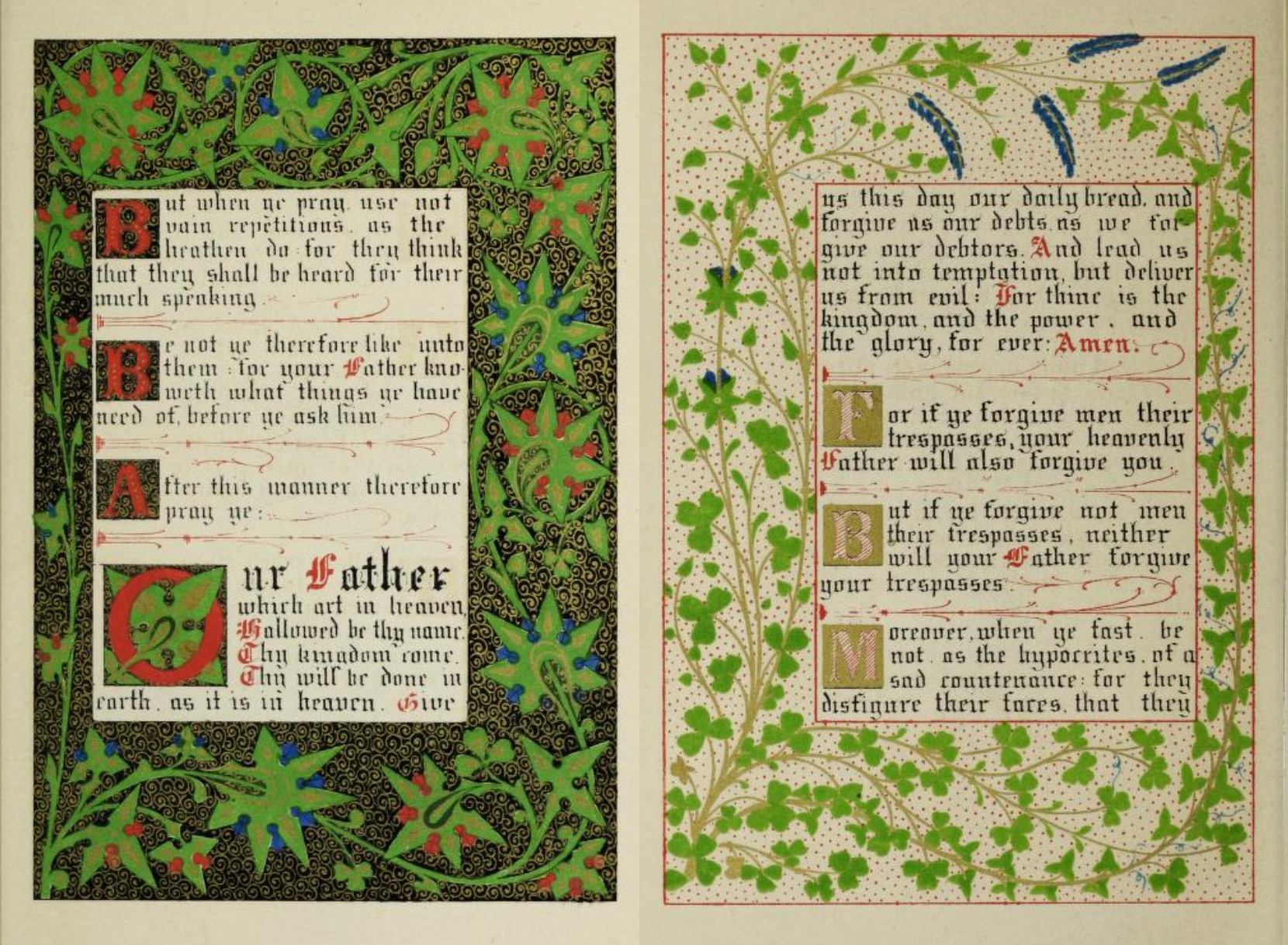
Matthew 6:7–16 from the 1845 illuminated book of The Sermon on the Mount, designed by Owen Jones.

In the King James Version of the Bible the text reads:

Be not ye therefore like unto them: for your Father
knoweth what things ye have need of, before ye ask him.

The World English Bible translates the passage as:

Therefore don’t be like them, for your Father
knows what things you need, before you ask him.

The Novum Testamentum Graece text is:

μὴ οὖν ὁμοιωθῆτε αὐτοῖς
οἶδεν γὰρ ὁ Πατὴρ ὑμῶν ὧν χρείαν ἔχετε πρὸ τοῦ ὑμᾶς αἰτῆσαι αὐτόν.

For a collection of other versions see here: Matthew 6:8

== Analysis ==
Jesus has just condemned the lengthy prayers of the Gentiles, and in this verse states that such prayers are unnecessary as God is aware of a person's desire even before they ask. A similar statement is made at Isaiah 65:24.

This raises the question of why prayer is even necessary at all, and this issue has been much discussed by theologians. The most common view is that while God does not need prayer, humans do. Hendriksen states that while God clearly does not need the actual act of prayer, each person does need such an outlet to bare their soul. Fowler believes this use of the term "your Father" is meant to enhance this fatherly aspect of God. According to Schweizer prayer is a gift from God for the comfort of humans, not an action performed to seek a reward. Fowler presents an alternate thesis that what Jesus is saying here is that, unlike in pagan prayers, there is no need to persuade or cajole God in prayer, God already knows all one's needs and a simple and sincere prayer would be the most effective.

== Commentary from the Church Fathers ==
Augustine: For we use many words then when we have to instruct one who is in ignorance, what need of them to Him who is Creator of all things; Your heavenly Father knoweth what ye have need of before you ask Him.

Jerome: On this there starts up a heresy of certain Philosophers who taught the mistaken dogma, that If God knows for what we shall pray, and, before we ask, knows what we need, our prayer is needlessly made to one who has such knowledge. To such we shortly reply, That in our prayers we do not instruct, but entreat; it is one thing to inform the ignorant, another to beg of the understanding: the first were to teach; the latter is to perform a service of duty.

Chrysostom: You do not then pray in order to teach God your wants, but to move Him, that you may become His friend by the importunity of your applications to Him, that you may be humbled, that you may be reminded of your sins.

Augustine: Nor ought we to use words in seeking to obtain of God what we would, but to seek with intense and fervent application of mind, with pure love, and suppliant spirit.

Augustine: But even with words we ought at certain periods to make prayer to God, that by these signs of things we may keep ourselves in mind, and may know what progress we have made in such desire, and may stir up ourselves more actively to increase this desire, that after it have begun to wax warm, it may not be chilled and utterly frozen up by divers cares, without our continual care to keep it alive. Words therefore are needful for us that we should be moved by them, that we should understand clearly what it is we ask, not that we should think that by them the Lord is either instructed or persuaded.

Augustine: Still it may be asked, what is the use of prayer at all, whether made in words or in meditation of things, if God knows already what is necessary for us. The mental posture of prayer calms and purifies the soul, and makes it of more capacity to receive the divine gifts which are poured into it. For God does not hear us for the prevailing force of our pleadings; He is at all times ready to give us His light, but we are not ready to receive it, but prone to other things. There is then in prayer a turning of the body to God, and a purging of the inward eye, whilst those worldly things which we desired are shut out, that the eye of the mind made single might be able to bear the single light, and in it abide with that joy with which a happy life is perfected.

Preceded by Matthew 6:7	Gospel of Matthew; Chapter 6	Succeeded by Matthew 6:9
