= Matthew 6:3 =

- ← 6:2 6:4 →
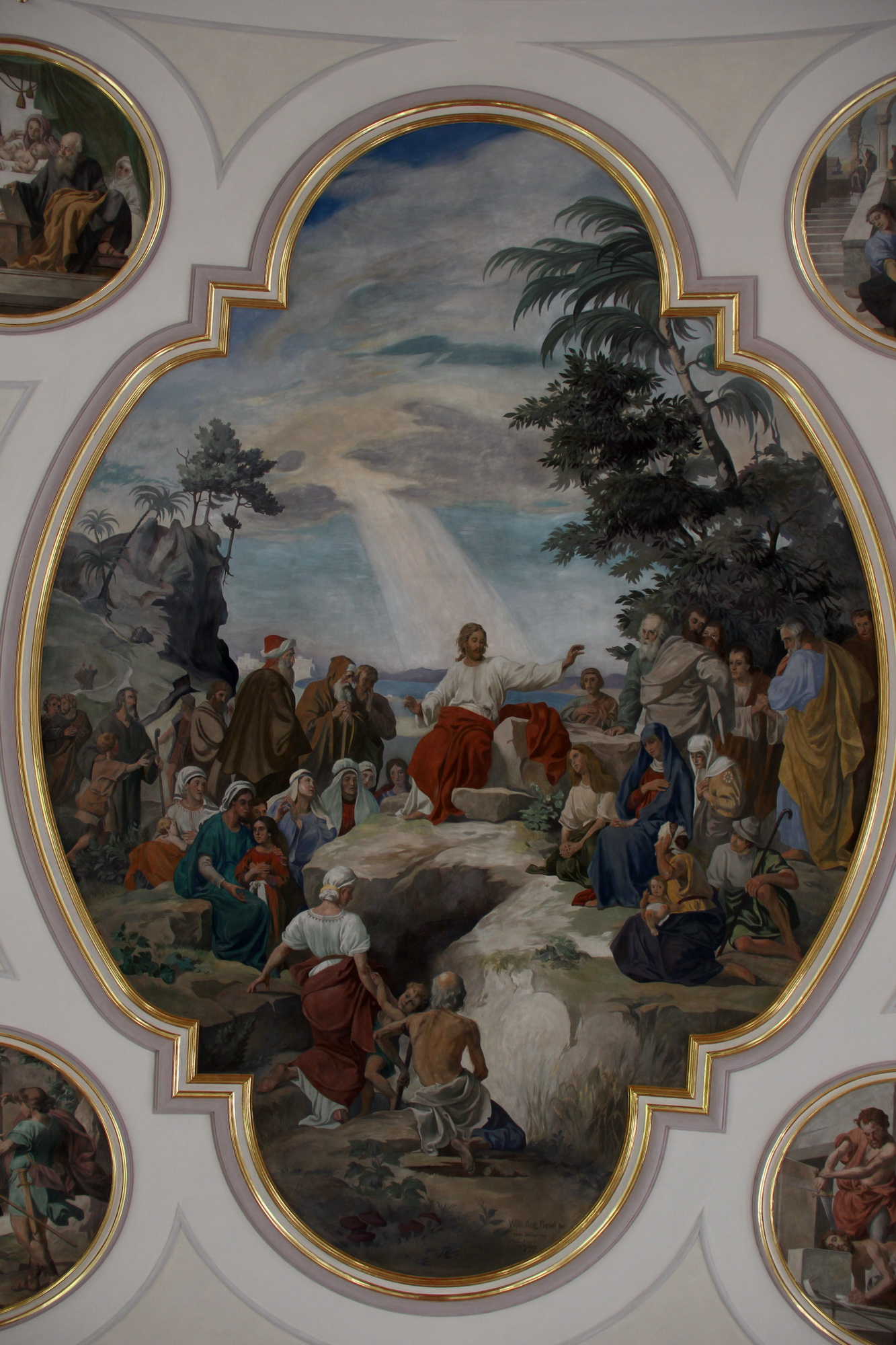
- "The Sermon on the Mount". St. Wolfgangkirche, Oberwinkling, Lower Bavaria, Germany.
- Book: Gospel of Matthew
- Christian Bible part: New Testament

Matthew 6:3 is the third verse of the sixth chapter of the Gospel of Matthew in the New Testament and is part of the Sermon on the Mount. This verse continues the discussion of how one should give to charity.

== Content ==
In the King James Version of the Bible the text reads:

But when thou doest alms, let not thy
left hand know what thy right hand doeth:

The World English Bible translates the passage as:

But when you do merciful deeds, don’t let
your left hand know what your right hand does,

The Novum Testamentum Graece text is:

σοῦ δὲ ποιοῦντος ἐλεημοσύνην
μὴ γνώτω ἡ ἀριστερά σου τί ποιεῖ ἡ δεξιά σου,

For a collection of other versions see here: Matthew 6:3

== Analysis ==
The previous two verses argued that charitable giving should be kept secret, so that it is not done for praise by others. This verse uses a metaphor to build on this argument, but there is some debate over exactly what this metaphor means. This verse is the origin of a common English expression. However "the left hand doesn't know what the right hand is doing" is generally a term of derision for an organization where different members are pursuing opposing or contradictory goals. This is quite different from this verse where Jesus presents the lack of coordination as an ideal.

Since the owner of the hands must know what both are doing, Jesus' statement here is thus generally considered a humorous hyperbole. One interpretation, outlined by Hendriksen, is that Jesus is here stating that just as we should avoid seeking the praise of others for our good deeds, we should also avoid self-congratulation for our piety. One should not feel smug about our own goodness, but should rather try to forget our own good deeds. Hendriksen feels this view is supported by Matthew 25:37-39. An alternate view, expressed by Filson, is that this verse is not a condemnation of smugness, but rather of scheming for public praise. Giving should be an automatic action without need to consider the potential rewards. If one spends too much effort pondering giving, one will scheme to have even secret donations made public so that you might be praised. Thus the verse means that right hand should by reflex be generous without the need for mental calculus, and if the mind is avoided so too is the left hand. This view sees this verse simply of a metaphor explaining the rules already laid out in the previous two verse. Fowler agrees with this second interpretation, and believes that Matthew 6:4 bears it out. Lewis takes a third approach, arguing the proverb is a metaphor for secrecy, and that it was earlier used as such by the Stoics. By this interpretation the left hand not knowing what the right is doing is a metaphor for how covert the proper donor should be. Harrington believes that the verse is based on an ancient proverb whose exact meaning is not known. His guess is that it referred to close friendship, and that this verse implies that friends that are even as close as one's left hand should not be made aware of donations.

== Uses ==
- Cited in the Didascalia Apostolorum (230 AD) in Chapter 15 about the jealousy of false widows towards one another.

Preceded by Matthew 6:2	Gospel of Matthew; Chapter 6	Succeeded by Matthew 6:4
