= Matthew 6:18 =

- ← 6:17 6:19 →
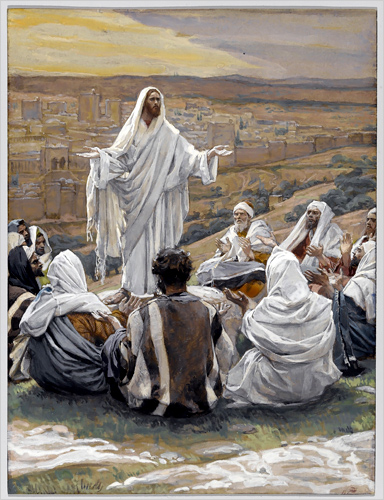
- James Tissot's The Lord's Prayer (1886-1896)
- Book: Gospel of Matthew
- Christian Bible part: New Testament

Matthew 6:18 is the eighteenth verse of the sixth chapter of the Gospel of Matthew in the New Testament and is part of the Sermon on the Mount. This verse concludes the discussion of fasting.

== Content ==
In the King James Version of the Bible the text reads:

That thou appear not unto men to fast, but unto
thy Father which is in secret: and thy Father,
which seeth in secret, shall reward thee openly.

The World English Bible translates the passage as:

So that you are not seen by men to be fasting,
but by your Father who is in secret, and your
Father, who sees in secret, will reward you.

The Novum Testamentum Graece text is:

ὅπως μὴ φανῇς τοῖς ἀνθρώποις νηστεύων
ἀλλὰ τῷ Πατρί σου τῷ ἐν τῷ κρυφαίῳ
καὶ ὁ Πατήρ σου ὁ βλέπων ἐν τῷ κρυφαίῳ ἀποδώσει σοι.

For a collection of other versions see BibleHub Matthew 6:18

== Analysis ==
Fasting (verses 16–18) is Jesus' third example of 'pious deeds', after previously discussing about almsgiving (verses 2–4) and prayer (verses 5–6).

The previous verse stated that, unlike the hypocrites, Jesus' followers should present a clean and normal appearance even when fasting. This verse closely parallels Matthew 6:4 and Matthew 6:6, and as in those verses, the message is that even if your piety is kept secret from those around you, God will still know about it and reward you. Davies and Allison note William Law's comment on this verse that it is impossible to keep one's fasting completely secret; disguising such an activity from one's family and friends is almost impossible. Law thus reads this verse as calling for keeping the notion private from general onlookers.

== Commentary from the Church Fathers ==
Chrysostom: In almsgiving indeed, He did not say simply, ‘Do not your alms before men,’ but added, ‘to be seen of them.’ But in fasting and prayer He added nothing of this sort; because alms cannot be so done as to be altogether hid, fasting and prayer can be so done. The contempt of men's praise is no small fruit, for thereby we are freed from the heavy slavery of human opinion, and become properly workers of virtue, loving it for itself and not for others. For as we esteem it an affront if we are loved not for ourselves but for others’ sake, so ought we not to follow virtue on the account of these men, nor to obey God for men's sake but for His own. Therefore, it follows here, But to thy Father which seeth in secret.

Glossa Ordinaria: That is, to thy heavenly Father, who is unseen, or who dwells in the heart through faith. He fasts to God who afflicts himself for the love of God, and bestows on others what he denies himself.

Saint Remigius: For it is enough for you that He who sees your conscience should be your rewarder.

Pseudo-Chrysostom: Spiritually interpreted—the face may be understood to mean the mental conscience. And as in the eyes of man a fair face has grace, so in the eyes of God a pure conscience has favour. This face the hypocrites, fasting on man's account, disfigure, seeking thereby to cheat both God and man; for the conscience of the sinner is always wounded. If then you have cast out all wickedness from your heart, you have washed your conscience, and fast well.

Pope Leo I: Fasting ought to be fulfilled not in abstinence of food only, but much more in cutting off vices. For when we submit ourselves to that discipline in order to withdraw that which is the nurse of carnal desires, there is no sort of good conscience more to be sought than that we should keep ourselves sober from unjust will, and abstinent from dishonourable action. This is an act of religion from which the sick are not excluded, seeing integrity of heart may be found in an infirm body.

Pseudo-Chrysostom: Spiritually again, thy head denotes Christ. Give the thirsty drink and feed the hungry, and therein you have anointed your head, that is, Christ, who cries out in the Gospel, In that ye have done this to one of the least of these my brethren, ye have done it to me. (Mat. 25:40.)

Gregory the Great: For God approves that fasting, which before His eyes opens the hands of alms. This then that you deny yourself, bestow on another, that wherein your flesh is afflicted, that of your needy neighbour may be refreshed.

Augustine: Or; by the head we rightly understand the reason, because it is preeminent in the soul, and rules the other members of the man. Now anointing the head has some reference to rejoicing. Let him therefore joy within himself because of his fasting, who in fasting turns himself from doing the will of the world, that he may be subject to Christ.

Glossa Ordinaria: Behold how everything in the New Testament is not to be taken literally. It were ridiculous to be smeared with oil when fasting; but it is behoveful for the mind to be anointed with the spirit of His love, in whose sufferings we ought to partake by afflicting ourselves.

Pseudo-Chrysostom: And truly we ought to wash our face, but to anoint, and not to wash, our head. For as long as we are in the body, our conscience is foul with sin. But Christ who is our head has done no sin.

Preceded by Matthew 6:17	Gospel of Matthew; Chapter 6	Succeeded by Matthew 6:19
