= Matthew 6:1 =

- ← 5:48 6:2 →
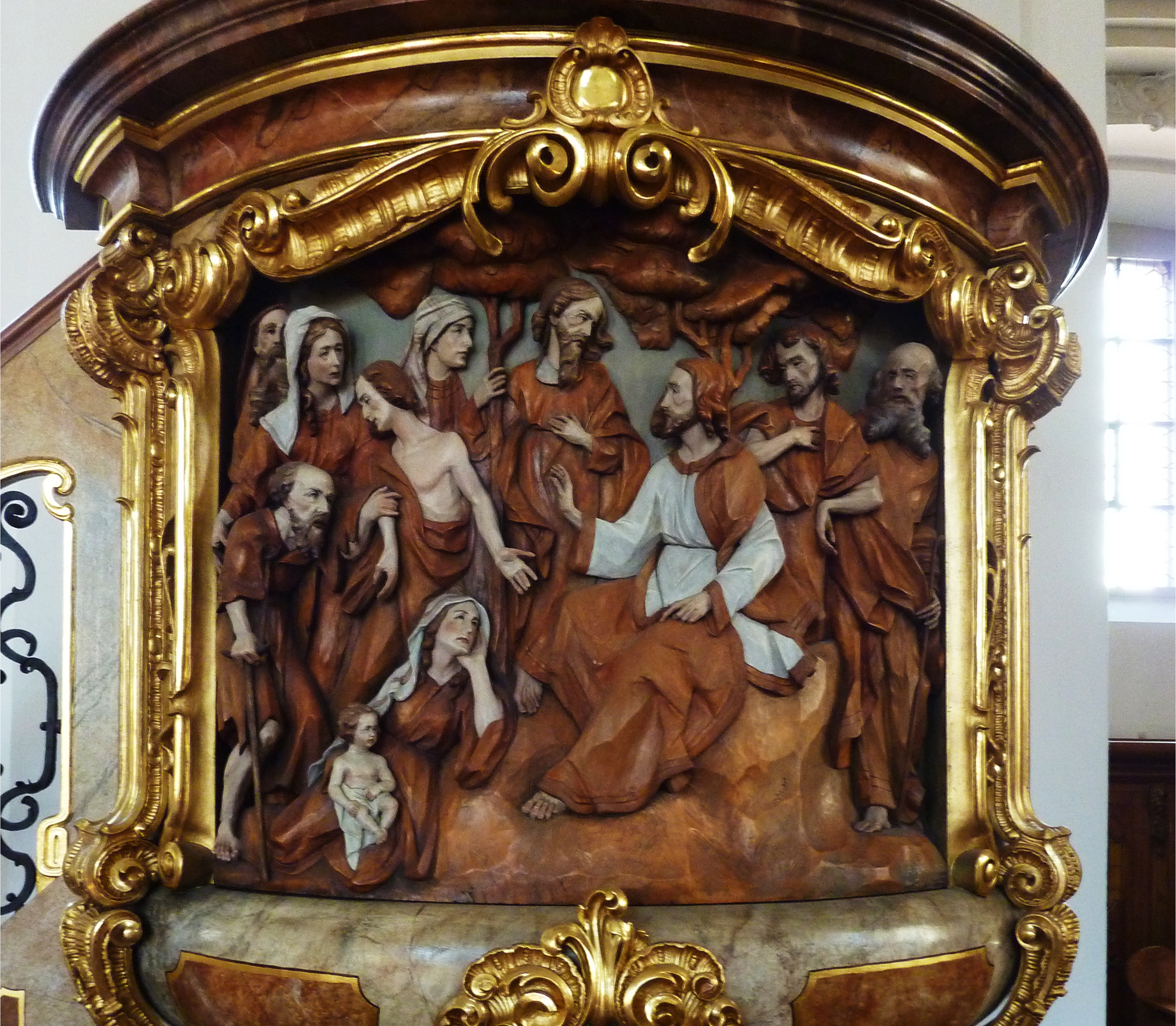
- "The Sermon on the Mount". St. Josef, Kollnau.
- Book: Gospel of Matthew
- Christian Bible part: New Testament

Matthew 6:1 is the first verse of the sixth chapter of the Gospel of Matthew in the New Testament and is part of the Sermon on the Mount. This verse begins the discussion of how even good deeds can be done for the wrong reasons.

== Content ==
In the King James Version of the Bible the text reads: Take heed that ye do not your alms before men, to be seen of them: otherwise ye have no reward of your Father which is in heaven.

The World English Bible translates the passage as:

"Be careful that you don't do your charitable
giving before men, to be seen by them, or else
you have no reward from your Father who is in heaven.

The Novum Testamentum Graece text is:

Προσέχετε δὲ τὴν δικαιοσύνην ὑμῶν μὴ ποιεῖν ἔμπροσθεν τῶν ἀνθρώπων
πρὸς τὸ θεαθῆναι αὐτοῖς
εἰ δὲ μήγε, μισθὸν οὐκ ἔχετε παρὰ τῷ Πατρὶ ὑμῶν τῷ ἐν τοῖς οὐρανοῖς,

whereas the Greek Textus Receptus reads:

Προσέχετε τὴν ἐλεημοσύνην ὑμῶν μὴ ποιεῖν ἔμπροσθεν τῶν ἀνθρώπων
πρὸς τὸ θεαθῆναι αὐτοῖς·
εἰ δὲ μήγε, μισθὸν οὐκ ἔχετε παρὰ τῷ πατρὶ ὑμῶν τῷ ἐν τοῖς οὐρανοῖς.

For a collection of other versions see BibleHub Matthew 6:1.

== δικαιοσυνην or ἐλεημοσύνην ==
There is some debate over the term translated as "charitable giving" in the World English Bible. In the ancient manuscripts, there are two different versions of this verse. One has Greek: την δικαιοσυνην, tēn dikaisunēn, iustitiam in the Vulgate. This term may be translated as charitable giving, but it can also be much more broadly translated as referring to "righteousness" or to any act of piety. The American Standard Version and the New International Version, for example, refer to "righteousness". By this translation this verse can be read as a condemnation of all overt religiosity.

Other manuscripts have Greek: τὴν ἐλεημοσύνην, tēn eleemosunēn, which explicitly refers to alms giving. This restricts what this verse is condemning to the more specific practice of overt generosity. According to the Jamieson-Fausset-Brown Bible Commentary, "The external authority for both readings is pretty nearly equal; but internal evidence is decidedly in favor of "righteousness". This commentary suggests that ελεημοσυνην may have been introduced here through a copyist's mistake, as the same word is also used in Matthew 6:2. Jack Lewis also argues that dikaisune was the original wording as eleemosune appears in Matthew 6:2, and that that verse would be redundant if the two words are the same. Floyd Filson also notes that it is likely that the word eleemosune was inserted into this verse as a copying error.

== Analysis ==
How this verse relates to Matthew 5:13-16 has long been of some discussion. Those verses exhort Jesus' disciples to be public symbols of proper piety, while this recommends giving in secret. France believes the two passages complement one another. This verse states that proper piety is not done to impress others, while the previous section states that the pious will automatically impress others without need for overt displays. Fowler notes that this verse also builds upon the preceding antitheses. In those verses Jesus consistently argued that ill motives are just as bad as evil acts, in this and subsequent verses he argues that it is impossible for good deeds to be the product of ill thoughts. This argument is likely linked to the condemnation of the Pharisees, which is an important theme in Matthew. The Pharisees were well known for their overt and sanctimonious piety.

The term "reward" in this verse is a translation of a Greek commercial term. Literally it refers to cancelled bills. Lewis notes that the expression is almost identical to the English phrase "paid in full," and this verse is stating that those who are overly boastful will not be "paid in full" by God. Hendriksen states that if one is expecting praise and adulation from one's fellows for being pious, then this is the only reward you will receive. You will miss out on God's much more important reward. Barclay notes that this verse is another mention of the reward motive in Matthew. While many theologians disagree, William Barclay reasons that this verse is overtly stating that while goodness for secular rewards is wrong, goodness in pursuit of heavenly rewards is perfectly acceptable.

These ideas were not original to Jesus, the notion that anonymous giving was the most pious form of charity was widely held at the time. Augsburger notes that at the time there was a Chamber of the Silent, created to allow the pious to donate anonymously.

== Commentary from the Church Fathers ==
Glossa Ordinaria: Christ having now fulfilled the Law in respect of commandments, begins to fulfil it in respect of promises, that we may do God’s commandments for heavenly wages, not for the earthly which the Law held out. All earthly things are reduced to two main heads, viz. human glory, and abundance of earthly goods, both of which seem to be promised in the Law. Concerning the first is that spoken in Deuteronomy, The Lord shall make thee higher than all the nations who dwell on the face of the earth (Deuteronomy 28:1). And in the same place it is added of earthly wealth, The Lord shall make thee abound in all good things. Therefore the Lord now forbids these two things, glory and wealth, to the attention of believers.

Chrysostom: Yet be it known that the desire of fame is near a kin to virtue.

Pseudo-Chrysostom: For when anything truly glorious is done, there ostentation has its readiest occasion; so the Lord first shuts out all intention of seeking glory; as He knows that this is of all fleshly vices the most dangerous to man. The servants of the Devil are tormented by all kinds of vices; but it is the desire of empty glory that torments the servants of the Lord more than the servants of the Devil.

Augustine: How great strength the love of human glory has, none feels, but he who has proclaimed war against it. For though it is easy for any not to wish for praise when it is denied him, it is difficult not to be pleased with it when it is offered.

Chrysostom: Observe how He has begun as it were describing some beast hard to be discerned, and ready to steal upon him who is not greatly on his guard against it; it enters in secretly, and carries off insensibly all those things that are within.

Gregory the Great: If then we seek the fame of giving, we make even our public deeds to be hidden in His sight; for if herein we seek our own glory, then they are already cast out of His sight, even though there be many by whom they are yet unknown. It belongs only to the thoroughly perfect, to suffer their deeds to be seen, and to receive the praise of doing them in such sort that they are lifted up with no secret exultation; whereas they that are weak, because they cannot attain to this perfect contempt of their own fame, must needs hide those good deeds that they do.

Augustine: In saying only, That ye be seen of men, without any addition, He seems to have forbidden that we should make that the end of our actions. For the Apostle who declared, If I yet pleased men, I should not be the servant of Christ, (Galatians 1:10.) says in another place, I please all men in all things. (1 Cor. 10:33.) This he did not that he might please men, but God, to the love of whom he desires to turn the hearts of men by pleasing them. As we should not think that he spoke absurdly, who should say. In this my pains in seeking a ship, it is not the ship I seek, but my country.

Augustine: He says this, that ye be seen of men, because there are some who so do their righteousness before men that themselves may not be seen, but that the works themselves may be seen, and their Father who is in heaven may be glorified; for they reckon not their own righteousness, but His, in the faith of whom they live.

Augustine: That He adds, Otherwise ye shall not have your reward before your Father who is in heaven, signifies no more than that we ought to take heed that we seek not praise of men in reward of our works.

Pseudo-Chrysostom: What shall you receive from God, who have given God nothing? What is done for God’s sake is given to God, and received by Him; but what is done because of men is cast to the winds. But what wisdom is it, to bestow our goods, to reap empty words, and to have despised the reward of God? Nay you deceive the very man for whose good word you look; for he thinks you do it for God’s sake, otherwise he would rather reproach than commend you. Yet must we think him only to have done his work because of men, who does it with his whole will and intention governed by the thought of them. But if an idle thought, seeking to be seen of men, mount up in any one’s heart, but is resisted by the understanding spirit, he is not thereupon to be condemned of man-pleasing; for that the thought came to him was the passion of the flesh, what he chose was the judgment of his soul.

Preceded by Matthew 5:48	Gospel of Matthew; Chapter 6	Succeeded by Matthew 6:2
