= Matthew 6:2 =

- ← 6:1 6:3 →
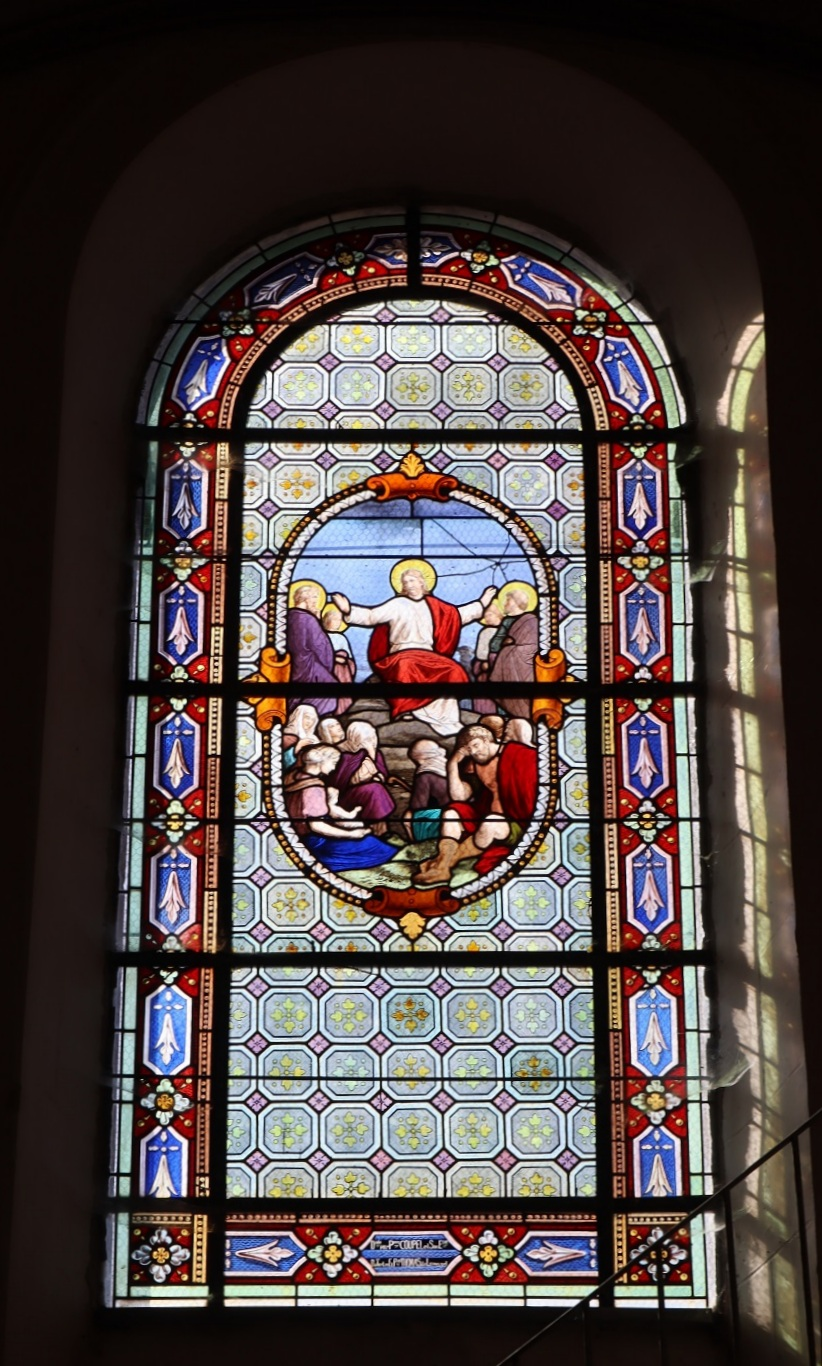
- "The Sermon on the Mount". Église Sainte-Anne-sur-Vilaine.
- Book: Gospel of Matthew
- Christian Bible part: New Testament

Matthew 6:2 is the second verse of the sixth chapter of the Gospel of Matthew in the New Testament and is part of the Sermon on the Mount. This verse continues the discussion of how even good deeds can be done for the wrong reasons.

== Content ==
In the King James Version of the Bible the text reads:

Therefore when thou doest thine alms, do not sound a
trumpet before thee, as the hypocrites do in the
synagogues and in the streets, that they may have glory
of men. Verily I say unto you, They have their reward.

The World English Bible (WEB) translates the passage as:

Therefore when you do merciful deeds, don’t sound a
trumpet before yourself, as the hypocrites do in the
synagogues and in the streets, that they may get glory from
men. Most certainly I tell you, they have received their reward.

The Novum Testamentum Graece text is:

Ὅταν οὖν ποιῇς ἐλεημοσύνην, μὴ σαλπίσῃς ἔμπροσθέν σου,
ὥσπερ οἱ ὑποκριταὶ ποιοῦσιν ἐν ταῖς συναγωγαῖς καὶ ἐν ταῖς ῥύμαις,
ὅπως δοξασθῶσιν ὑπὸ τῶν ἀνθρώπων
ἀμὴν λέγω ὑμῖν, ἀπέχουσιν τὸν μισθὸν αὐτῶν.

For a collection of other versions see BibleHub Matthew 6:2.

== Analysis ==
There were three main displays of piety in Jesus' era: alms giving, prayer, and fasting. All three are discussed in Matthew 6, with this verse beginning the discussion of alms giving, though some translations have Matthew 6:1 also reference alms rather than general righteousness. The term translated as "merciful deeds" in the WEB refers explicitly to alms giving. Alms giving was a religious act, one commanded in the Old Testament in Deuteronomy 15:11 and other places. In this era all were expected to contribute alms, and services for the needy were funded through them.

In this verse, Jesus condemns the hypocrites who give to charity for their own glory rather than for pious reasons. In Classical Greek a hypocrite was simply an actor who pretended to be another person on stage. By the time the Septuagint was written, the word had gained the negative connotations that it has today, and in the Gospel of Matthew the word is clearly a pejorative one.

For many centuries the blowing of trumpets during alms giving was taken literally, with Cyril of Alexandria being perhaps the first to interpret the verse this way. Modern scholars mostly disagree.

There is no evidence that the Pharisees, and others seen as hypocrites, actually blew upon trumpets to publicize their giving, and Harold Fowler suggests that it is unlikely they would have been so brazen. Jack Lewis thinks the reference might be to the autumn public fasts, which would have been accompanied by the blowing of horns. Lachs considers this improbable as there is no direct connection to the period of fasting and alms giving. Schweizer speculates that when the list of donors were read off in the Temple that especially large ones may have been accompanied by horns. Hendriksen thinks it unlikely that this would have been allowed. Lachs agrees that such acts were improbable. There is no historic evidence for such displays, and rabbinic writings from this period were just as critical of boastful giving. There was also no understanding of trumpeting as boasting in the contemporary literature, an expression that has developed in English perhaps as a result of this verse.

Lachs supports the theory that the verse does not actually refer to trumpets, but instead to the alms-boxes, known as sophar chests. The meaning would thus be to put your donation in the chest quietly, so those around cannot hear. The two words are similar, and a transcriber who had not known about the unusual word for the boxes may have replaced it with the more common one for the horn. Davies and Allison reject this theory, arguing that the context seems to make clear that a musical instrument is meant, and that there is no textual evidence for a mistranslation. They do note that the author of Matthew could be making a pun based on the two similar words.

This verse and verse 5 both mention hypocritical practice in the synagogues. Fowler notes that some scholars argue that synagogue cannot here refer to the religious building, as charity was not distributed there. Synagogue might thus be being used in its more general sense of any meeting place. Hendriksen feels the reference to streets, or alleys, is included because that is the place where the poor would have gathered.

Fowler argues that this verse is arguing that one's piety cannot be both to impress God and to impress other people; rather true piety must be dedicated to God and God alone. While those who make public displays of charity may receive praise and adulation from their fellows, this is the only reward they will receive as God will ignore such crassly motivated generosity.

== Commentary from the Church Fathers ==
Augustine: Above the Lord had spoken of righteousness in general. He now pursues it through its different parts.

Pseudo-Chrysostom: He opposes three chief virtues, alms, prayer, and fasting, to three evil things against which the Lord undertook the war of temptation. For He fought for us in the wilderness against gluttony; against covetousness on the mount; against false glory on the temple. It is alms that scatter abroad against covetousness which heaps up; fasting against gluttony which is its contrary; prayer against false glory, seeing that all other evil things come out of evil, this alone comes out of good; and therefore it is not overthrown but rather nourished of good, and has no remedy that may avail against it but prayer only.

Ambrosiaster: The sum of all Christian discipline is comprehended in mercy and piety, for which reason He begins with almsgiving.

Pseudo-Chrysostom: The trumpet stands for every act or word that tends to a display of our works; for instance, to do alms if we know that some other person is looking on, or at the request of another, or to a person of such condition that he may make us return; and unless in such cases not to do them. Yea, even if in some secret place they are done with intent to be thought praiseworthy, then is the trumpet sounded.

Augustine: Thus what He says, Do not sound a trumpet before thee, refers to what He had said above, Take heed that ye do not your righteousness before men.

Jerome: He who sounds a trumpet before him when he does alms is a hypocrite. Whence he adds, as the hypocrites do.

Isidore The name ‘hypocrite’ is derived from the appearance of those who in the shows are disguised in masks, variously coloured according to the character they represent, sometimes male, sometimes female, to impose on the spectators while they act in the games.

Augustine: As then the hypocrites, (a word meaning ‘one who feigns,’) as personating the characters of other men, act parts which are not naturally their own—for he who personates Agamemnon, is not really Agamemnon, but feigns to be so—so likewise in the Churches, whosoever in his whole conduct desires to seem what he is not, is a hypocrite; he feigns himself righteous and is not really so, seeing his only motive is praise of men.

Glossa Ordinaria: In the words, in the streets and villages, he marks the public places which they selected; and in those, that they may receive honour of men, he marks their motive.

Gregory the Great: It should be known, that there are some who wear the dress of sanctity, and are not able to work out the merit of perfection, yet who must in no wise be numbered among the hypocrites, because it is one thing to sin from weakness, another from crafty affectation.

Augustine: And such sinners receive from God the Searcher of hearts none other reward than punishment of their deceitfulness; Verily I say unto you, they have their reward,

Jerome: A reward not of God, but of themselves, for they receive praise of men, for the sake of which it was that they practised their virtues.

Preceded by Matthew 6:1	Gospel of Matthew; Chapter 6	Succeeded by Matthew 6:3
