= Matthew 6 =

- ← chapter 5 chapter 7 →
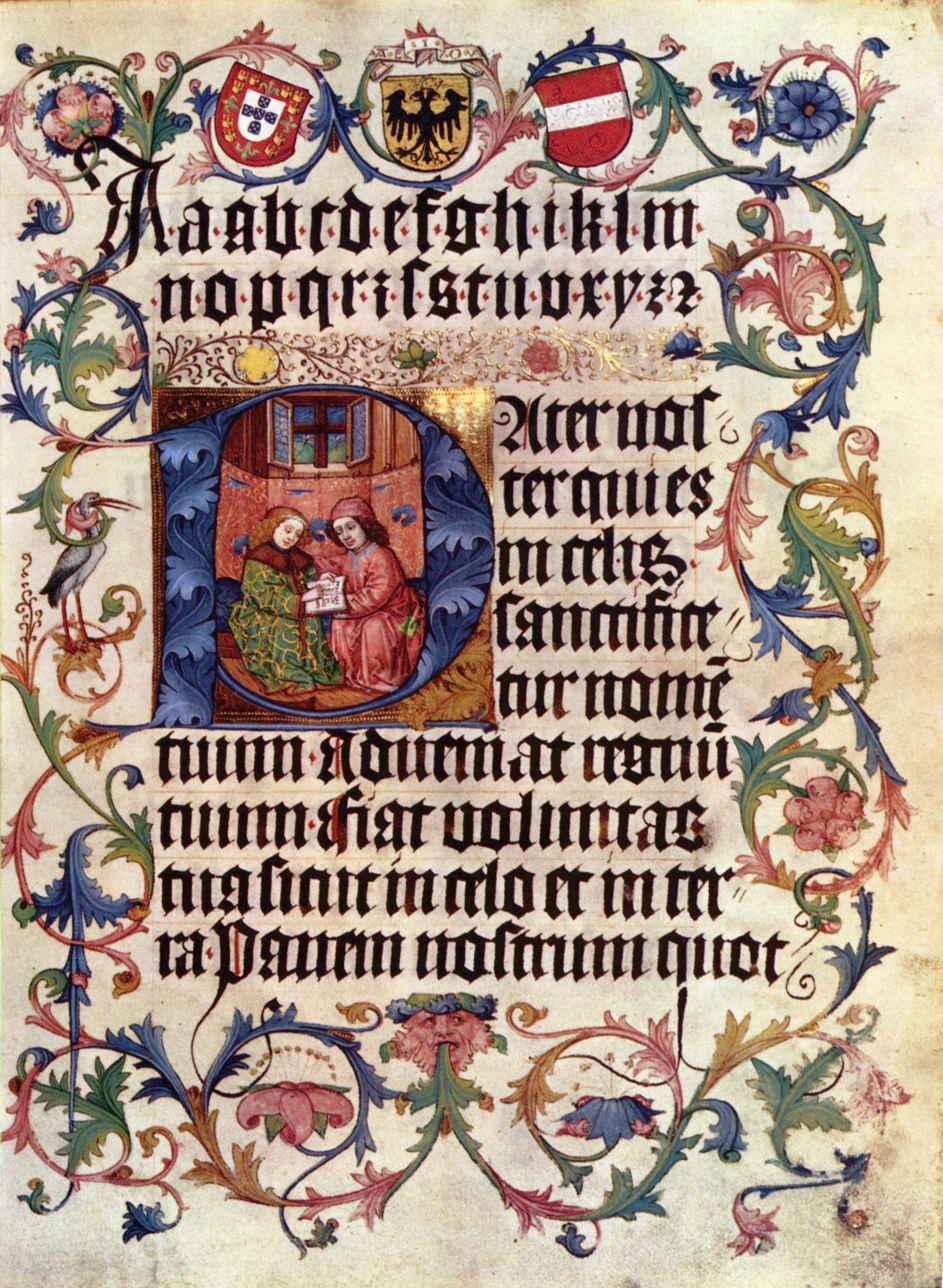
- The Lord's Prayer, in Matthew 6:9. 1500, Vienna.
- Book: Gospel of Matthew
- Category: Gospel
- Christian Bible part: New Testament
- Order in the Christian part: 1

Matthew 6 is the sixth chapter of the Gospel of Matthew in the New Testament. This chapter contains the central portion of the Sermon on the Mount, including the Lord's Prayer.

== Text ==
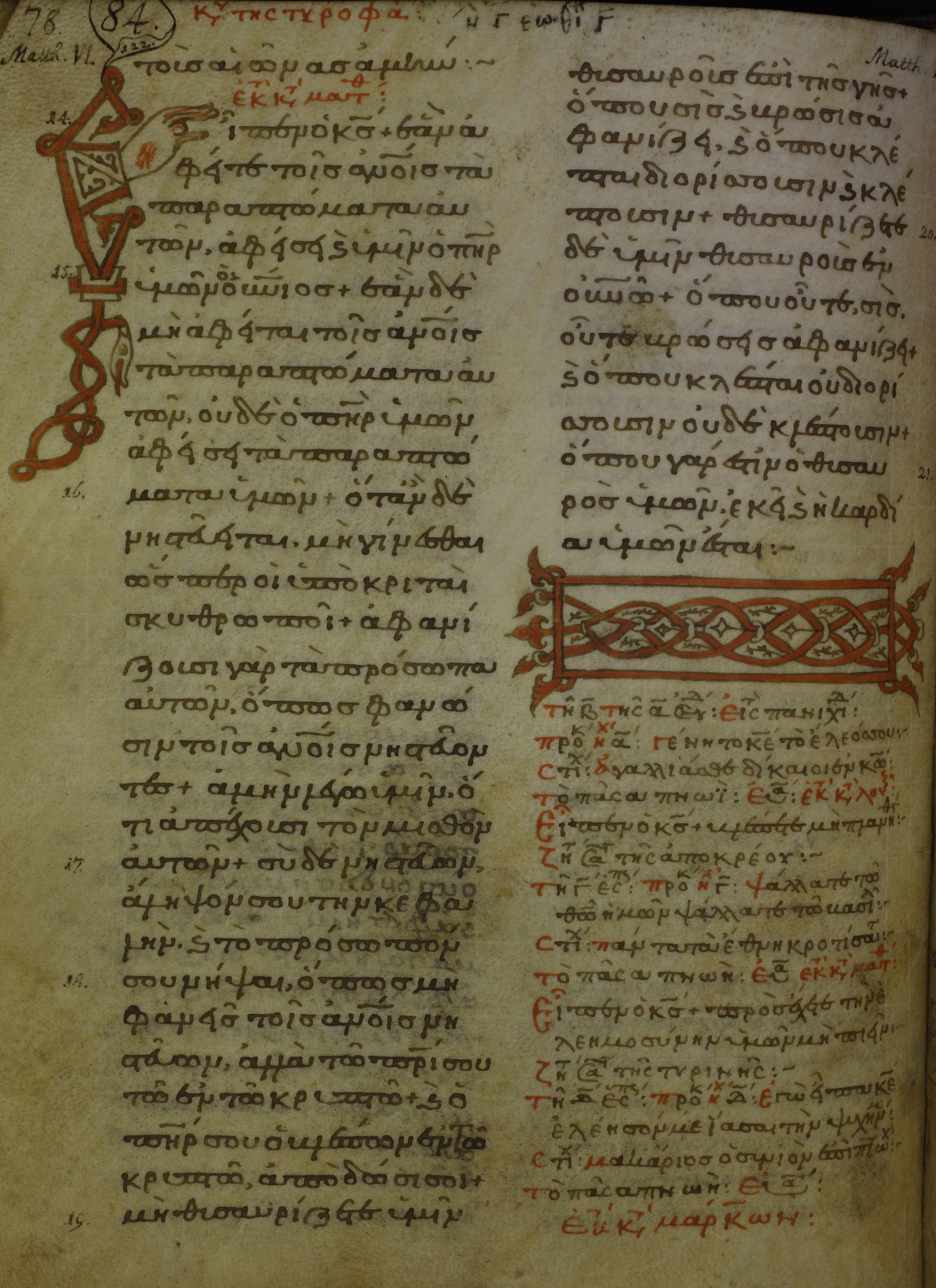
Lectionary 239 Folio 39 verso with the Greek text of Matthew 6:14–21 (13th century)

The original text was written in Koine Greek. This chapter is divided into 34 verses.

=== Textual witnesses ===
Some early manuscripts containing the text of this chapter are: (Note: The extant Codex Alexandrinus and Codex Ephraemi Rescriptus do not contain this chapter due to lacunae.)

- Codex Vaticanus (~325–350; complete)
- Codex Sinaiticus (~330–360; complete)
- Codex Washingtonianus (~400)
- Codex Bezae (~400; extant verses 1–19).

== Structure ==
The first part of the chapter, Matthew 6:1–18, deals with the outward and inward expression of piety, referring to almsgiving, private prayer and fasting. New Testament scholar Dale Allison suggests that this section acts as "a sort of commentary" on Matthew 5:21–48, or a short "cult-didache": Matthew 5:21–48 details "what to do", whereas Matthew 6:1–18 teaches "how to do it". Sometimes called the "Discourse on Ostentation", these verses address the three most important outward expressions of Jewish piety, almsgiving, prayer, and fasting. Jesus endorses the standard teachings that these acts are important. Throughout this section he stresses that worship and piety should not be ostentatious, and ideally should be done in secret. He strongly contravenes those who make public displays of their piety, which can be understood as teaching that those who are pious to impress others will only impress people, and will do nothing to impress God.

Matthew 6:19–34 deals with possessions and the issues of priorities and trust. The first part in Matthew 6:19–24 has three elements about two treasures, two eyes and two masters. The second part in Matthew 6:25–34 deals with trust in God and also has three elements and provides reasons for not being anxious.

In John Wesley's analysis of the Sermon on the Mount, chapter five outlines "the sum of all true religion", allowing this chapter to detail "rules for that right intention which we are to preserve in all our outward actions, unmixed with worldly desires or anxious cares for even the necessaries of life" and the following chapter to provide "cautions against the main hinderances of religion". Wesley further analyses chapter 6 as follows:

- Verses 1–4: the right intention and manner of giving alms
- Verses 5–15: the right intention, manner, form, and prerequisites of prayer
- Verses 16–18: the right intention, and manner of fasting
- Verses 19–34: the necessity of a pure intention in all things, unmixed either with the desire of riches, or worldly care, and fear of want.

== Verses ==
- Matthew 6:1
- Matthew 6:2
- Matthew 6:3
- Matthew 6:4
- Matthew 6:5
- Matthew 6:6
- Matthew 6:7
- Matthew 6:8
- Matthew 6:9
- Matthew 6:10
- Matthew 6:11
- Matthew 6:12
- Matthew 6:13
- Matthew 6:14
- Matthew 6:15
- Matthew 6:16
- Matthew 6:17
- Matthew 6:18
- Matthew 6:19
- Matthew 6:20
- Matthew 6:21
- Matthew 6:22
- Matthew 6:23
- Matthew 6:24
- Matthew 6:25
- Matthew 6:26
- Matthew 6:27
- Matthew 6:28
- Matthew 6:29
- Matthew 6:30
- Matthew 6:31
- Matthew 6:32
- Matthew 6:33
- Matthew 6:34

== Literary references ==
In the 2007 book Harry Potter and the Deathly Hallows by J. K. Rowling, it is written that the inscription on the tombstone of Ariana Dumbledore reads "Where your treasure is, there will your heart be also". This is taken from the King James Version of Matthew 6:21 and/or Luke 12:34, which are identical.

== Early manuscripts ==
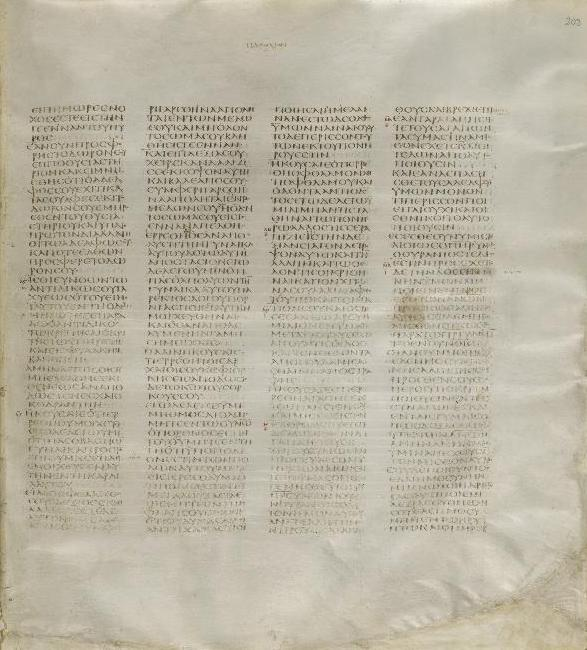
Codex Sinaiticus (AD 330–60), Matthew 5:22–6:4

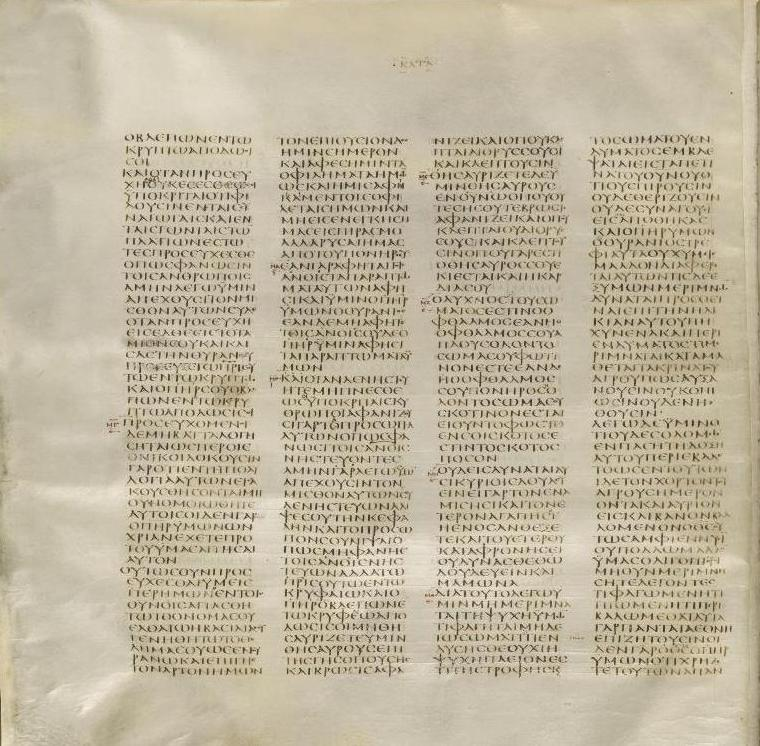
Codex Sinaiticus, Matthew 6:4–32

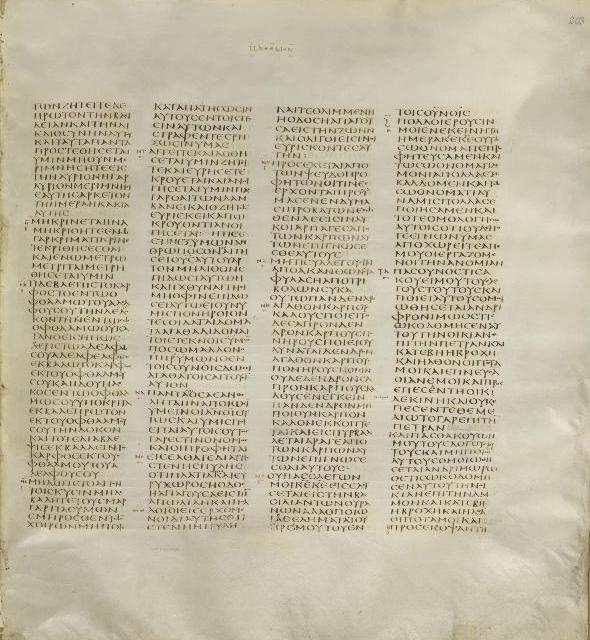
Codex Sinaiticus, Matthew 6:32–7:27

== See also ==
- Sufficient unto the day is the evil thereof
