= Matthew 6:5 =

- ← 6:4 6:7 →
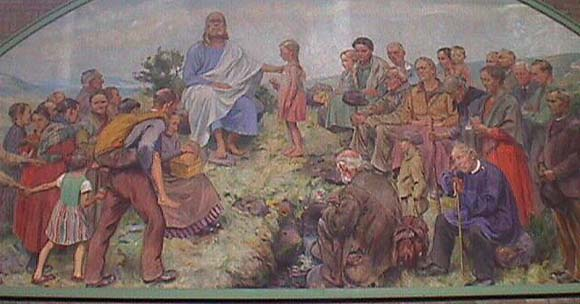
- "The Sermon on the Mount". Heinrich Pforr, St. Matthäus, Hann. Münden, Germany, 1999.
- Book: Gospel of Matthew
- Christian Bible part: New Testament

Matthew 6:5 is the fifth verse of the sixth chapter of the Gospel of Matthew in the New Testament and is part of the Sermon on the Mount. This verse opens discussion on the proper procedure for praying.

== Content ==
In the King James Version of the Bible the text reads:

And when thou prayest, thou shalt not be as the hypocrites are: for they love to pray standing in the synagogues and in the corners of the streets, that they may be seen of men. Verily I say unto you, They have their reward.

The World English Bible translates the passage as:

When you pray, you shall not be as the hypocrites, for they love to stand and pray in the synagogues and in the corners of the streets, that they may be seen by men. Most certainly, I tell you, they have received their reward.

The Novum Testamentum Graece text is:

Καὶ ὅταν προσεύχησθε, οὐκ ἔσεσθε ὡς οἱ ὑποκριταί ὅτι φιλοῦσιν ἐν ταῖς συναγωγαῖς καὶ ἐν ταῖς γωνίαις τῶν πλατειῶν ἑστῶτες προσεύχεσθαι, ὅπως φανῶσιν τοῖς ἀνθρώποις ἀμὴν λέγω ὑμῖν, ἀπέχουσιν τὸν μισθὸν αὐτῶν.

For a collection of other versions see Bible Gateway Matthew 6:5

== Analysis ==
The previous verses have been discussing alms-giving, and Jesus argued that such giving should be in secret, and not be undertaken to pursue praise from others. This verse extends this argument to prayer, another of the cornerstones of Jewish piety. In that era there were public prayers at the temple and in synagogues, and private prayers to be said on one's own. There were also regularly scheduled times for prayer. Swiss theologian Eduard Schweizer notes that when it was time to pray, one was instructed to seek out an inconspicuous corner, and prayers not at public events were to be quietly mumbled. As mentioned in this verse, standing was the standard position for prayer.

In this verse Jesus condemns as hypocrites those who make an ostentatious display of praying. As with Matthew 6:2, the same association can be seen between hypocrisy and the synagogues, although the word synagogue might be used in its more general sense of "any meeting place". This verse states that for those who pray to be seen by others, their only reward will be the adulation of their peers. Similarly, Luke 18:9-14 condemns a Pharisee who seeks out the most prominent location in the Temple to pray. However, theologian M. Eugene Boring notes that Jewish writings from that time are equally condemning exhibitionist prayers, so these verses should not imply that it was a mainstream practice. William Hendriksen notes that while in Matthew 6:2 the word used for street can also be read as alley, this verse is clear in stating that the prayer is taking place at the corner of the major thoroughfares.

== Commentary from the Church Fathers ==
Pseudo-Chrysostom: "Solomon says, Before prayer, prepare thy soul. (Ecclus. 18:23.) This he does who comes to prayer doing alms; for good works stir up the faith of the heart, and give the soul confidence in prayer to God. Alms then are a preparation for prayer, and therefore the Lord after speaking of alms proceeds accordingly to instruct us concerning prayer."

Augustine: "He does not now bid us pray, but instructs us how we should pray; as above He did not command us to do alms, but showed the manner of doing them."

Pseudo-Chrysostom: "Prayer is as it were a spiritual tribute which the soul offers of its own bowels. Wherefore the more glorious it is, the more watchfully ought we to guard that it is not made vile by being done to be seen of men."

Chrysostom: "He calls them hypocrites, because feigning that they are praying to God, they are looking round to men; and, He adds, they love to pray in the synagogues."

Pseudo-Chrysostom: "But I suppose that it is not the place that the Lord here refers to, but the motive of him that prays; for it is praiseworthy to pray in the congregation of the faithful, as it is said, In your Churches bless ye God. (Ps. 68:26.) Whoever then so prays as to be seen of men does not look to God but to man, and so far as his purpose is concerned he prays in the synagogue. But he, whose mind in prayer is wholly fixed on God, though he pray in the synagogue, yet seems to pray with himself in secret. In the corners of the streets, namely, that they may seem to be praying retiredly; and thus earn a twofold praise, both that they pray, and that they pray in retirement."

Glossa Ordinaria: "Or, the corners of the streets, are the places where one way crosses another, and makes four cross-ways."

Pseudo-Chrysostom: "He forbids us to pray in an assembly with the intent of being seen of that assembly, as He adds, that they may be seen of men. He that prays therefore should do nothing singular that might attract notice; as crying out, striking his breast, or reaching forth his hands."

Augustine: "Not that the mere being seen of men is an impiety, but the doing this, in order to be seen of men."

Chrysostom: "It is a good thing to be drawn away from the thought of empty glory, but especially in prayer. For our thoughts are apt to stray of themselves; if then we address ourselves to prayer with this disease upon us, how shall we understand those things that are said by us?"

Augustine: "The privity of other men is to be so far shunned by us, as it leads us to do anything with this mind that we look for the fruit of their applause."

Pseudo-Chrysostom: "Verily I say unto you, they have received their reward, for every man where he sows there he reaps, therefore they who pray because of men, not because of God, receive praise of men, not of God."

Chrysostom: "He says, have received, because God was ready to give them that reward which comes from Himself, but they prefer rather that which comes from men. He then goes on to teach how we should pray."

Jerome: "This if taken in its plain sense teaches the hearer to shun all desire of vain honour in praying."

Pseudo-Chrysostom: "That none should be there present save he only who is praying, for a witness impedes rather than forwards prayer."

Preceded by Matthew 6:4	Gospel of Matthew; Chapter 6	Succeeded by Matthew 6:6
