= Matthew 6:33 =

- ← 6:32 6:34 →
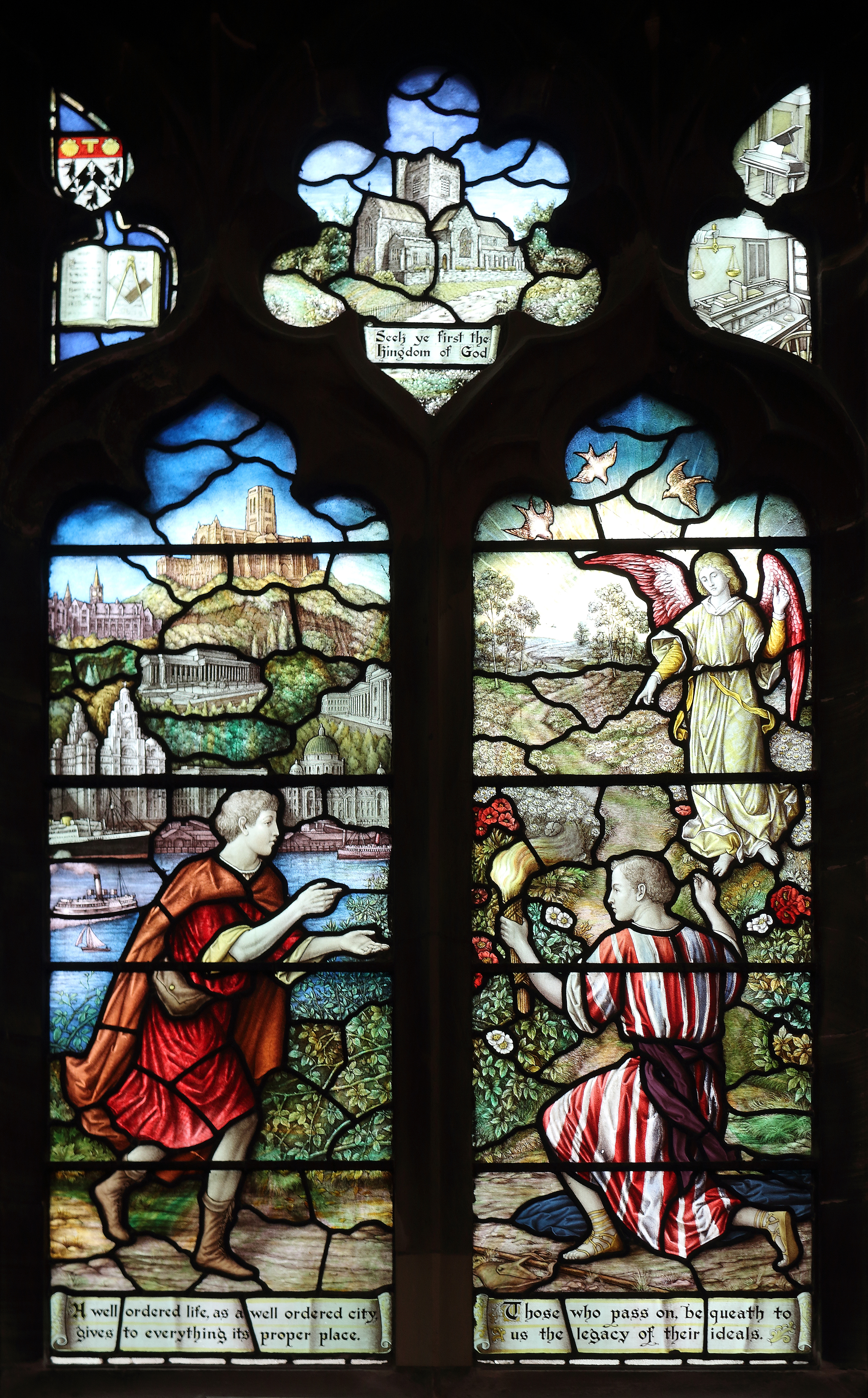
- Memorial window to Richard Alma Parkin at St Nicholas, Wallasey, depicting Matthew 6:33 "Seek ye first the kingdom of God".
- Book: Gospel of Matthew
- Christian Bible part: New Testament

Matthew 6:33 is the thirty-third verse of the sixth chapter of the Gospel of Matthew in the New Testament and is part of the Sermon on the Mount. This verse continues the discussion of worry about material provisions.

== Content ==
In the Authorized King James Version of the Bible the text reads:

But seek ye first the kingdom of God,
and his righteousness; and all these
things shall be added unto you.

The World English Bible translates the passage as:

But seek first God’s Kingdom, and
his righteousness; and all these
things will be given to you as well.

The Novum Testamentum Graece text is:

ζητεῖτε δὲ πρῶτον τὴν βασιλείαν
καὶ τὴν δικαιοσύνην αὐτοῦ,
καὶ ταῦτα πάντα προστεθήσεται ὑμῖν.

The Textus Receptus adds του θεου after την βασιλειαν.

== Analysis ==
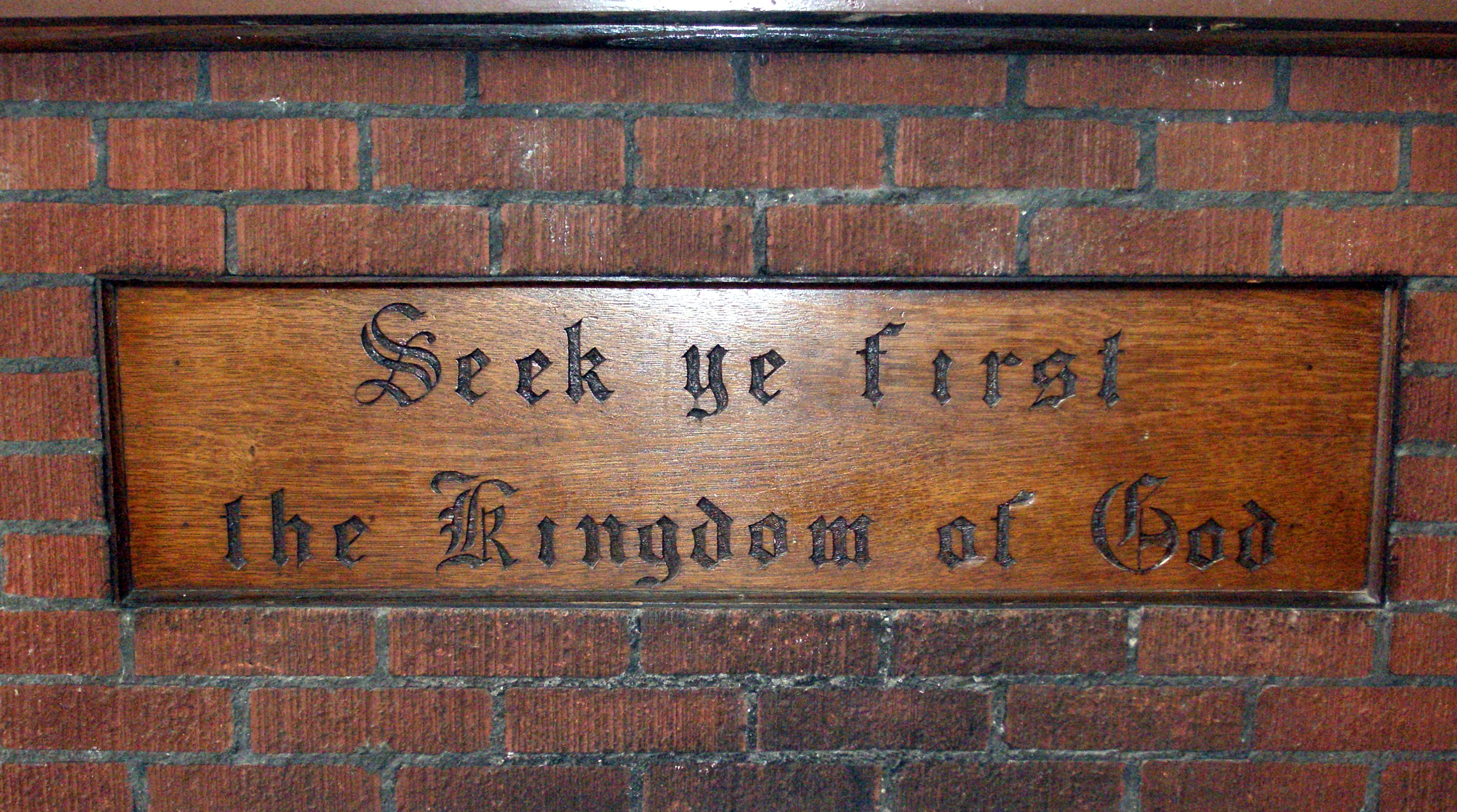
Fireplace mantelpiece in the church hall of the former North Parkdale Methodist Church (Toronto, Ontario) with the text from Matthew 6:33.

Jesus has just told his followers not to worry about material things such as food or clothing, as God will provide the needs of his followers. Earlier in the chapter, Jesus spoke of how his followers must not pursue wealth and material things before God. This verse ties the two notions together. If one places the pursuit of the Kingdom of God first, then material needs will follow without need for worry or anxiety. The present imperative verb seek makes clear that pursuing the eschatological kingdom is not a passive act, but one that must be pursued with rigour. David Hill notes that the word God (του θεου) is left out of many of the better early manuscripts of the Gospel, and it thus might be a later addition. "Kingdom of God" is a somewhat unusual phrase for Matthew's Gospel, whose author generally prefers Kingdom of Heaven. Even without the word it is quite clear that this is a reference to the Kingdom of God. The parallel to this verse at Luke 12:31 does not include “first”, and does not mention righteousness, but as France notes, the author of Matthew shows a special interest in righteousness throughout his gospel.

== Commentary from the Church Fathers ==
Pseudo-Chrysostom: Thus then let him who believes himself to be under the rule of God’s counsel, commit his provision into God’s hand; but let him meditate of good and evil, which if he do not, he will neither shun the evil, nor lay hold of the good. Therefore it is added, Seek ye first the kingdom of God, and his righteousness. The kingdom of God is the reward of good works; His righteousness is the way of piety by which we go to that kingdom. If then you consider how great is the glory of the Saints, you will either through fear of punishment depart from evil, or through desire of glory hasten to good. And if you consider what is the righteousness of God, what He loves, and what He hates, the righteousness itself will show you His ways, as it attends on those that love it. And the account we shall have to render is not whether we have been poor or rich, but whether we have done well or ill, which is in our own power.

Glossa Ordinaria: Or, He says his righteousness, as though He were to say, ‘Ye are made righteous through Him, and not through yourselves.’

Pseudo-Chrysostom: The earth for man’s sin is accursed that it should not put forth fruit, according to that in Genesis, Cursed is the ground in thy works; but when we do well, then it is blessed. (Gen. 3:17.) Seek righteousness therefore, and thou shalt not lack food. Wherefore it follows, and all these things shall be added unto you.

Chrysostom: And He said not, Shall be given, but, Shall be added, that you may learn that the things that are now, are nought to the greatness of the things that shall be.

Augustine: But when we read that the Apostle suffered hunger and thirst, let us not think that God’s promises failed him; for these things are rather aids. That Physician to whom we have entirely entrusted ourselves, knows when He will give and when He will withhold, as He judges most for our advantage. So that should these things ever be lacking to us, (as God to exercise us often permits,) it will not weaken our fixed purpose, but rather confirm it when wavering.

== See also ==
- Seek Ye First

| Preceded by Matthew 6:32 | Gospel of Matthew; Chapter 6 | Succeeded by Matthew 6:34 |
