= Matthew 6:7 =

- ← 6:6 6:8 →
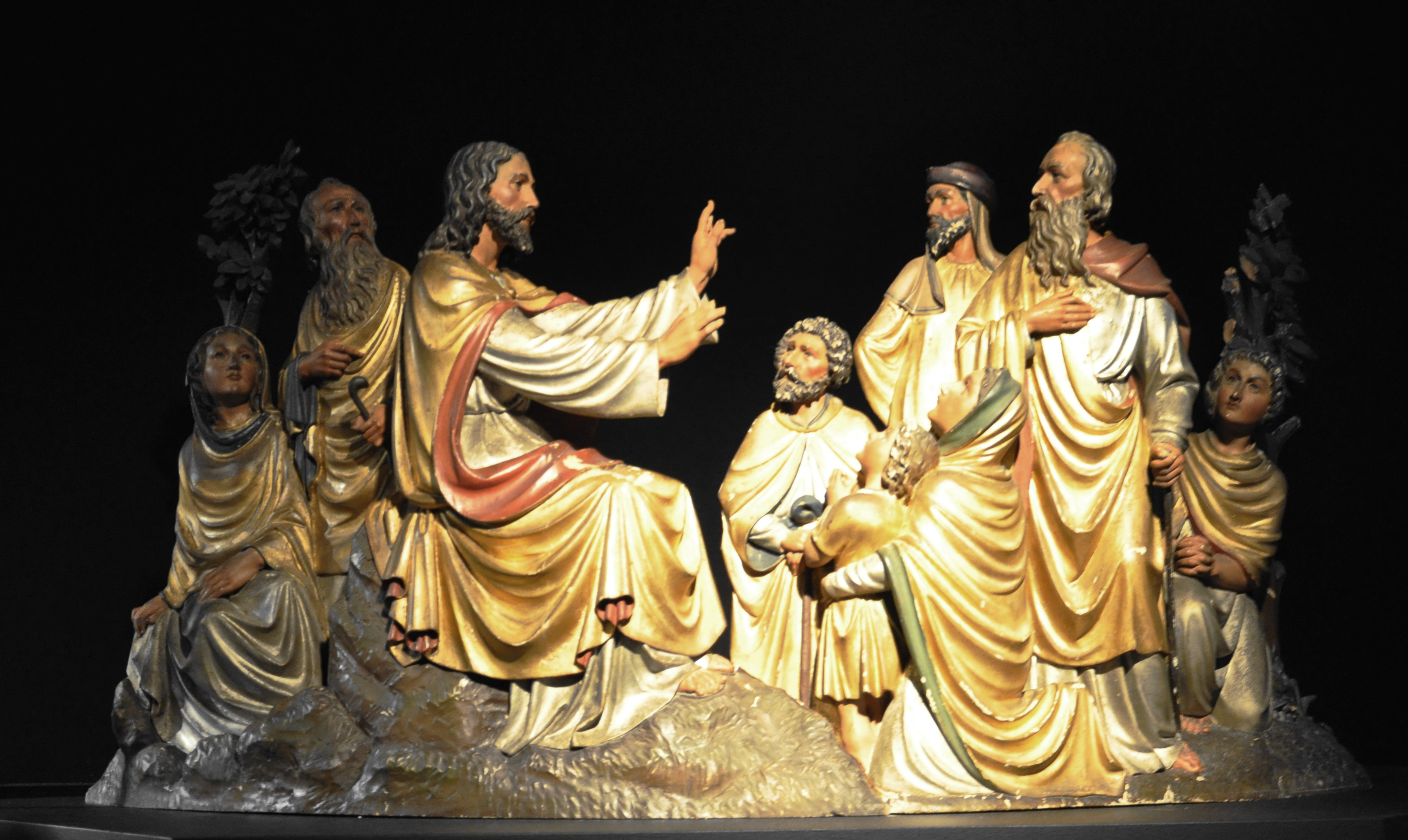
- "The Sermon on the Mount". Relief from Kanzelkorb der ehemaligen Kanzel der Liebfrauenkirche, Ravensburg, 1899.
- Book: Gospel of Matthew
- Christian Bible part: New Testament

Matthew 6:7 is the seventh verse of the sixth chapter of the Gospel of Matthew in the New Testament and is part of the Sermon on the Mount. This verse continues the discussion on the proper procedure for praying, specifically addressing "vain repetition".

== Content ==
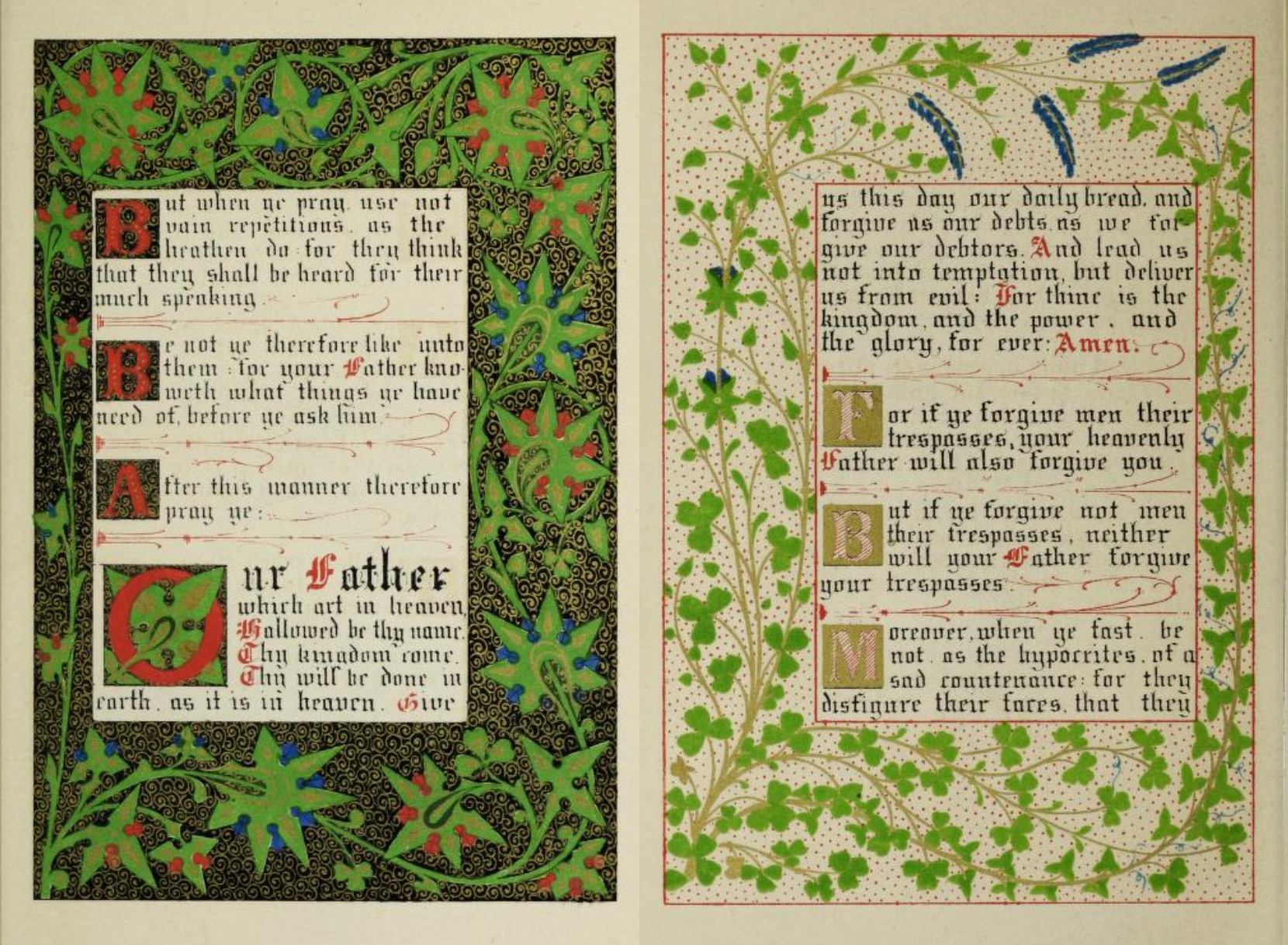
Matthew 6:7–16 from the 1845 illuminated book of The Sermon on the Mount, designed by Owen Jones.

In the King James Version of the Bible, the text reads: (Note: For a collection of other versions, see Matthew 6:7 at Biblegateway.)

But when ye pray, use not vain repetitions, as the heathen do: for they think that they shall be heard for their much speaking.

The World English Bible translates the passage as:

In praying, don't use vain repetitions, as the Gentiles do; for they think that they will be heard for their much speaking.

The Novum Testamentum Graece text reads:

Προσευχόμενοι δὲ μὴ βατταλογήσητε ὥσπερ οἱ ἐθνικοί· δοκοῦσιν γὰρ ὅτι ἐν τῇ πολυλογίᾳ αὐτῶν εἰσακουσθήσονται.

— Biblehub., Strong's Concordance., https://biblehub.com/greek/945.htm

== Analysis ==
The Greek word translated as "vain repetitions" is βατταλογήσητε (battalogein). This word is unknown outside this verse, appearing in no other literature contemporaneous with the text. It may be linked to the Greek term for "babbling", or be derived from the Hebrew batel, meaning "vain". It is often assumed to be a related to the word polulogein, and thus a reference to a large quantity of words.

This verse moves away from condemning the hypocrites to condemning the Gentiles. The text does not specify who exactly the "Gentiles" mentioned are, though pagan prayers to Baal and other gods are mentioned in the Old Testament.

France notes that in this era, Gentile prayer was portrayed as repeated incantations that had to be perfectly recited, but where the spirit and understanding of the prayer were secondary. Fowler states that the Jews believed the pagans needed to incessantly repeat their prayers, as their gods would not answer them, whereas followers of the Abrahamic God did not need to repeat their prayers, as their God would hear them the first time.

Schweizer presents an alternate view. He does not feel battalogein is a reference to repetition, but to nonsense. He argues that the Jews of that era felt that the pagans had forgotten the true name of God, and that their prayers were thus filled with long lists of meaningless words in an attempt to ensure the true name of God would at some point be mentioned.

Matthew 6:7 is not generally seen as a condemnation of repetitive prayer. Jesus himself gives a prayer to be repeated in Matthew 6:9, and Matthew 26:44 is noted to be repeating a prayer himself. This verse is read as a condemnation of rote prayer without understanding of why one is praying. Protestants such as Martin Luther have used this verse to attack Catholic prayer practices such as the use of rosaries.

== Commentary from the Church Fathers ==
Augustine:

As the hypocrites use [sic] to set themselves so as to be seen in their prayers, whose reward is to be acceptable to men; so the Ethnici (that is, the Gentiles) use [sic] to think that they shall be heard for their much speaking; therefore He adds, When ye pray, do not ye use many words...

John Cassian:

We should indeed pray often, but in short form, lest if we be long in our prayers, the enemy that lies in wait for us, might suggest something for our thoughts.

Chrysostom:

Hereby He dissuades from empty speaking in prayer; as, for example, when we ask of God things improper, as dominions, fame, overcoming of our enemies, or abundance of wealth. He commands then that our prayers should not be long; long, that is, not in time, but in multitude of words. For it is right that those who ask should persevere in their asking; being instant in prayer, as the Apostle instructs; but does not thereby enjoin us to compose a prayer of ten thousand verses, and speak it all; which He secretly hints at, when He says, Do not ye use many words.

Glossa Ordinaria:

What He condemns is many words in praying that come of want of faith; as the Gentiles do. For a multitude of words were needful for the Gentiles, seeing the dæmons could not know for what they petitioned, until instructed by them; they think they shall be heard for their much speaking.

Gregory the Great:

True prayer consists rather in the bitter groans of repentance, than in the repetition of set forms of words.

== Notes ==
Preceded by Matthew 6:6	Gospel of Matthew; Chapter 6	Succeeded by Matthew 6:8
