= Matthew 6:34 =

- ← 6:33 7:1 →
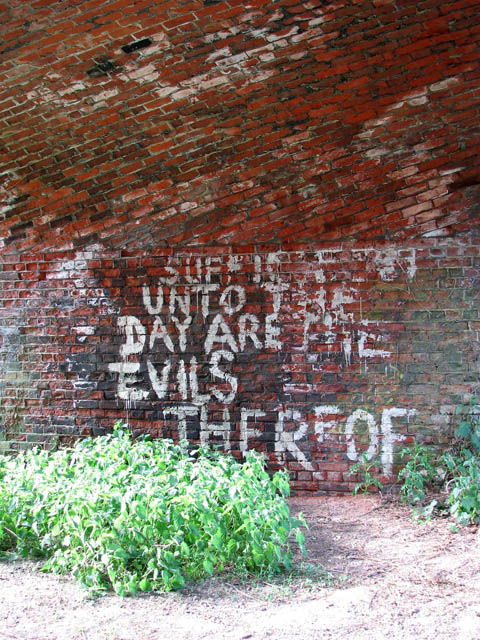
- "Sufficient unto the day are the evils thereof" (Matthew 6:34). Graffiti under bridge carrying Church Road across the Weavers' Way (2009).
- Book: Gospel of Matthew
- Christian Bible part: New Testament

Matthew 6:34 is “Therefore do not worry about tomorrow, for tomorrow will worry about itself. Each day has enough trouble of its own.” The King James Version phrasing is Sufficient unto the day is the evil thereof. It implies that we should not worry about the future, since each day contains an ample burden of evils and suffering.

It is the thirty-fourth, and final, verse of the sixth chapter of the Gospel of Matthew in the New Testament and is part of the Sermon on the Mount. This verse concludes the discussion of worry about material provisions.

== Versions ==
In the King James Version:

Take therefore no thought for the morrow: for the morrow shall take thought for the things of itself. Sufficient unto the day is the evil thereof.

The World English Bible translates the passage as:

Therefore don’t be anxious for tomorrow, for tomorrow will be anxious for itself. Each day’s own evil is sufficient.

The New American Standard Bible says:

Each day has enough trouble of its own.

The Good News Bible says:

There is no need to add to the troubles each day brings.

In the Koine Greek original it is:

μὴ οὖν μεριμνήσητε εἰς τὴν αὔριον, ἡ γὰρ αὔριον μεριμνήσει ἑαυτῆς· ἀρκετὸν τῇ ἡμέρᾳ ἡ κακία αὐτῆς.
mē oun merimnēsēte eis tēn aurion hē gar aurion merimnēsei heautēs arketon tē hēmera hē kakia autēs

== Earlier sayings ==
The same words, in Hebrew, are used to express the same thought in the Rabbinic Jewish saying dyya l'tzara b'shaata (דיה לצרה בשעתה), "the suffering of the (present) hour is enough for it".

The Epicurean writers Anacreon and Horace said:

Quid sit futurum cras, fuge quaerere.
Avoid asking what the future will bring.

== Analysis ==
Luz notes that there are two interpretations of this verse: an optimistic and a pessimistic one. The optimistic view is that this verse is a rephrasing of the ancient idea of carpe diem, live each day to its fullest because one never knows what will happen tomorrow. The more pessimistic view, which Luz thinks is more likely, is that the evil of each individual day is so great and so overbearing that it is hard enough to get through one day, much less worry about those coming. Luz argues that while the previous verse is optimistic that in the long run the Kingdom of Heaven will be proclaimed and all will be well, in the short run the future is little more than misery.

There are other interpretations of this verse. Fowler argues that one should not worry about tomorrow, as one is being presumptuous that one will live to see tomorrow, when God has not yet granted that extra day. Morris feels that the verse should be read as an argument to always defer worry to tomorrow, and that by doing so one will never have to worry today.

This verse is not found in Luke, and Schwatrs, and other scholars, feel it was most likely a composition of the author(s) of Matthew, a concluding remark for what had gone before. Morrow can either mean the next day in particular, or the future in general. The word here translated as evil (kakia), can mean that, but more likely it simply means trouble or difficulty, rather than the evil of Satan. The verse also had parallels in the wisdom literature of the period.

== Commentary from the Church Fathers ==
Glossa Ordinaria: Having forbid anxiety for the things of the day, He now forbids anxiety for future things, such a fruitless care as proceeds from the fault of men, in these words, Be not ye anxious about the morrow.

Jerome: "To-morrow in Scripture signifies time future, as Jacob in Genesis says, To-morrow shall my righteousness hear me. (Gen. 30:33.) And in the phantasm of Samuel the Pythoness says to Saul, To-morrow shalt thou be with me. (1 Sam. 28:19.) He yields therefore unto them that they should care for things present, though He forbids them to take thought for things to come. For sufficient for us is the thought of time present; let us leave to God the future which is uncertain. And this is that He says, The morrow shall be anxious for itself; that is, it shall bring its own anxiety with it. For sufficient for the day is the evil thereof. By evil He means here not that which is contrary to virtue, but toil, and affliction, and the hardships of life."

Chrysostom: "Nothing brings so much pain to the spirit as anxiety and care. That He says, The morrow shall he anxious for itself, comes of desire to make more plain what He speaks; to that end employing a prosopopeia of time, after the practice of many in speaking to the rude populace; to impress them the more, He brings in the day itself complaining of its too heavy cares. Has not every day a burden enough of its own, in its own cares? why then do you add to them by laying on those that belong to another day?"

Pseudo-Chrysostom: "Otherwise; By to-day are signified such things as are needful for us in this present life; To-morrow denotes those things that are superfluous. Be not ye therefore anxious for the morrow, thus means, Seek not to have aught beyond that which is necessary for your daily life, for that which is over and above, i. e. To-morrow, shall care for itself. To-morrow shall he anxious for itself, is as much as to say, when you have heaped up superfluities, they shall care for themselves, you shall not enjoy them, but they shall find many lords who shall care for them. Why then should you be anxious about those things, the property of which you must part with? Sufficient for the day is its own evil, as much as to say, The toil you undergo for necessaries is enough, do not toil for things superfluous."

Hilary of Poitiers: "This is further comprehended under the full meaning of the Divine words. We are commanded not to be careful about the future, because sufficient for our life is the evil of the days wherein we live, that is to say, the sins, that all our thought and pains be occupied in cleansing this away. And if our care be slack, yet will the future be careful for itself, in that there is held out to us a harvest of eternal love to be provided by God."

Thomas Sheridan wrote a sermon upon this verse on the occasion of the death of Queen Anne. His sermon notes being dated August 1, the date of Anne's death, he later reused it for an anniversary of the accession of King George I. Using a verse discussing the "evils" of the day on such an occasion shocked the audience; Sheridan was accused of Jacobite sympathies and lost his chaplaincy.

The sermon has sometimes been interpreted to mean that God knows everyone's needs.

== See also ==
- Bible Hub Matthew 6:34

Preceded by Matthew 6:33	Gospel of Matthew; Chapter 6	Succeeded by Matthew 7:1
