= Matthew 6:16 =

- ← 6:15 6:17 →
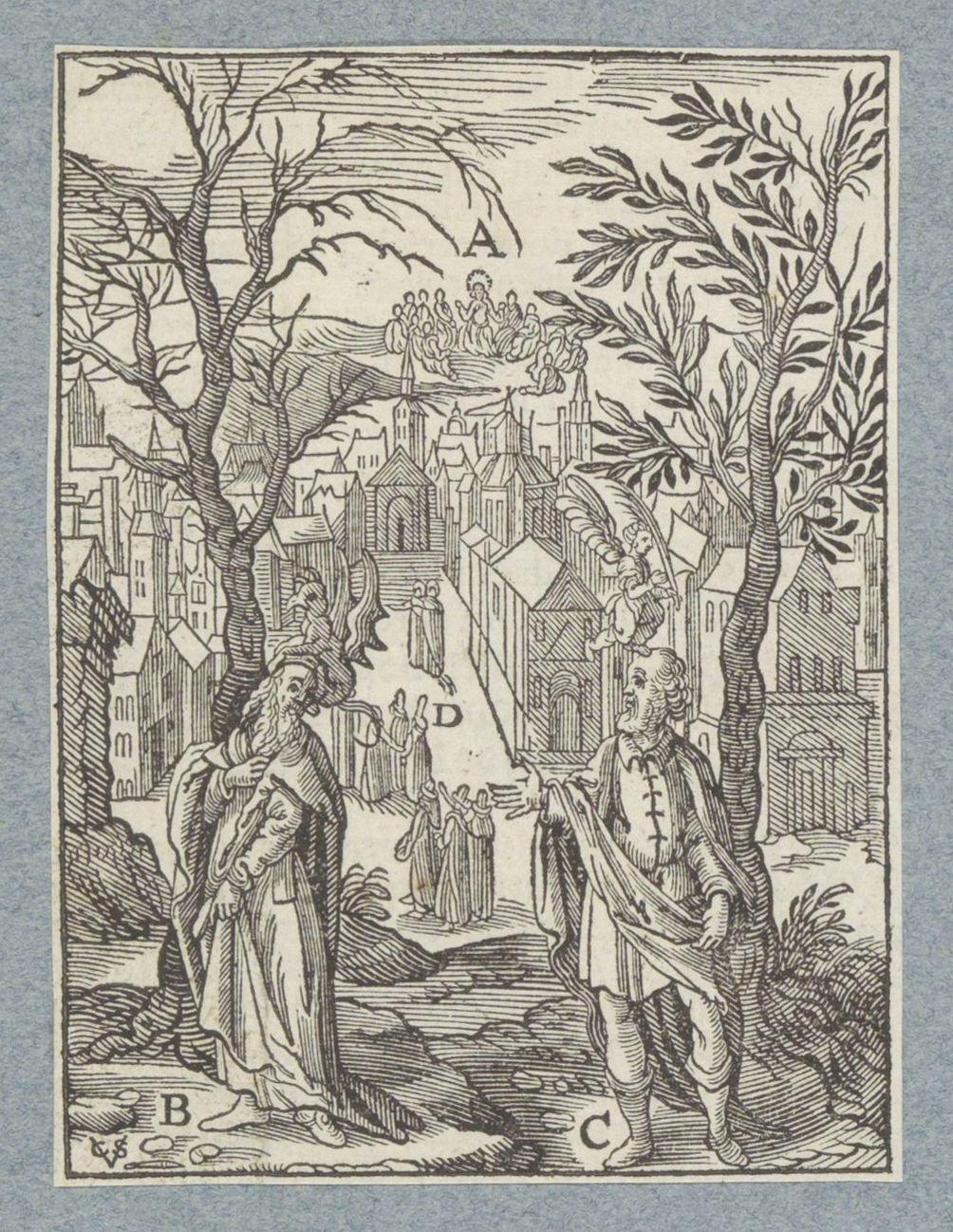
- Illustration of Matthew 6:16-18 ("when you fast, ... your fasting may not be seen by men") by Christoffel van Sichem (1629).
- Book: Gospel of Matthew
- Christian Bible part: New Testament

Matthew 6:16 is the sixteenth verse of the sixth chapter of the Gospel of Matthew in the New Testament and is part of the Sermon on the Mount. This verse opens the discussion of fasting.

== Content ==
In the King James Version of the Bible the text reads:

Moreover when ye fast, be not, as the hypocrites, of a sad
countenance: for they disfigure their faces, that they may appear
unto men to fast. Verily I say unto you, They have their reward.

The World English Bible translates the passage as:

“Moreover when you fast, don’t be like the hypocrites, with sad faces.
For they disfigure their faces, that they may be seen by men to be
fasting. Most certainly I tell you, they have received their reward.

The Novum Testamentum Graece text is:

Ὅταν δὲ νηστεύητε, μὴ γίνεσθε ὡς οἱ ὑποκριταὶ σκυθρωποί
ἀφανίζουσιν γὰρ τὰ πρόσωπα αὐτῶν ὅπως φανῶσιν τοῖς ἀνθρώποις νηστεύοντες
ἀμὴν λέγω ὑμῖν, ἀπέχουσιν τὸν μισθὸν αὐτῶν.

For a collection of other versions see BibleHub Matthew 6:16

== Analysis ==
Previously this chapter has discussed proper procedure for alms giving and prayer. In this verse Jesus moves on the third important form of Jewish worship: fasting. Fasting was an important part of piety in this period. All Jews were expected to fast on major holidays, such as the Day of Atonement, but some far more often, sometimes twice a week. Jesus' views on fasting parallels his views of other forms of worship. He decries those that make a public spectacle of their piety, and assures his followers that the reward for such worship is only public adulation, and God will give no reward for this behaviour.

"Disfigure their faces" (aphanizo) literally means "make their faces invisible." It may refer to putting ash on the face to darken one's complexion and make sure that everyone around is aware that one is fasting. This may also reflect the original meaning of hypocrite as actor, as these fasters are putting on a show of suffering.

== Commentary from the Church Fathers ==
Pseudo-Chrysostom: Forasmuch as that prayer which is offered in a humble spirit and contrite heart, shows a mind already strong and disciplined; whereas he who is sunk in self-indulgence cannot have a humble spirit and contrite heart; it is plain that without fasting prayer must be faint and feeble; therefore, when any would pray for any need in which they might be, they joined fasting with prayer, because it is an aid thereof. Accordingly the Lord, after His doctrine respecting prayer, adds doctrine concerning fasting, saying, When ye fast, be not ye as the hypocrites, of sad countenance. The Lord knew that vanity may spring from every good thing, and therefore bids us root out the bramble of vain-gloriousness which springs in the good soil, that it choke not the fruit of fasting. For though it cannot be that fasting should not be discovered in any one, yet is it better that fasting should show you, than that you should show your fasting. But it is impossible that any in fasting should be gay, therefore He said not, Be not sad, but Be not made sad; for they who discover themselves by any false displays of their affliction, they are not sad, but make themselves; but he who is naturally sad in consequence of continued fasting, does not make himself sad, but is so.

Jerome: The word exterminare, so often used in the ecclesiastical Scriptures through a blunder of the translators, has a quite different meaning from that in which it is commonly understood. It is properly said of exiles who are sent beyond the boundary of their country. Instead of this word, it would seem better to use the word demoliri, ‘to destroy,’ in translating the Greek ἀφανίζειν. The hypocrite destroys his face, in order that he may feign sorrow, and with a heart full of joy wears sorrow in his countenance.

Gregory the Great: For by the pale countenance, the trembling limbs, and the bursting sighs, and by all so great toil and trouble, nothing is in the mind but the esteem of men.

Pope Leo I: But that fasting is not pure, that comes not of reasons of continence, but of the arts of deceit.

Pseudo-Chrysostom: If then he who fasts, and makes himself of sad countenance, is a hypocrite, how much more wicked is he who does not fast, yet assumes a fictitious paleness of face as a token of fasting.

Augustine: On this paragraph it is to be specially noted, that not only in outward splendor and pomp, but even in the dress of sorrow and mourning, is there room for display, and that the more dangerous, inasmuch as it deceives under the name of God’s services. For he who by inordinate pains taken with his person, or his apparel, or by the glitter of his other equipage, is distinguished, is easily proved by these very circumstances to be a follower of the pomps of this world, and no man is deceived by any semblance of a feigned sanctity in him. But when any one in the profession of Christianity draws men’s eyes upon him by unwonted beggary and slovenliness in dress, if this be voluntary and not compulsory, then by his other conduct may be seen whether he does this to be seen of men, or from contempt of the refinements of dress.

Saint Remigius: The reward of the hypocrites’ fast is shown, when it is added, That they may seem to men to fast; verily I say unto you, They have their reward; that is, that reward for which they looked.

== Bibliography ==
- Hill, David. The Gospel of Matthew. Grand Rapids: Eerdmans, 1981
- Morris, Leon. The Gospel According to Matthew. Grand Rapids: W.B. Eerdmans, 1992.

Preceded by Matthew 6:15	Gospel of Matthew; Chapter 6	Succeeded by Matthew 6:17
