= Matthew 6:17 =

- ← 6:16 6:18 →
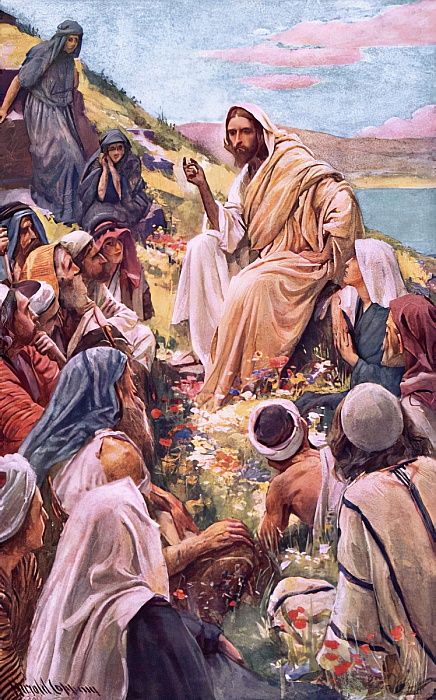
- "Sermon on the Mount" by Harold Copping (1862–1917).
- Book: Gospel of Matthew
- Christian Bible part: New Testament

Matthew 6:17 is the seventeenth verse of the sixth chapter of the Gospel of Matthew in the New Testament and is part of the Sermon on the Mount. This verse continues the discussion of fasting.

== Content ==
In the King James Version of the Bible the text reads:

But thou, when thou fastest, anoint
thine head, and wash thy face;

The World English Bible translates the passage as:

But you, when you fast, anoint
your head, and wash your face;

The Novum Testamentum Graece text is:

σὺ δὲ νηστεύων ἄλειψαί σου τὴν κεφαλὴν
καὶ τὸ πρόσωπόν σου νίψαι

For a collection of other versions see BibleHub Matthew 6:17

== Analysis ==
Fasting (verses 16–18) is Jesus' third example of 'pious deeds', after almsgiving (verses 2–4) and prayer (verses 5–6).

The previous verse attacked how the hypocrites made a show of fasting and made everyone around them aware of their pious suffering. In this verse Jesus counsels his followers to hide any discomfort. Most scholars believe that anointing the head and washing the face were both considered parts of daily hygiene. Jesus teaches his followers to maintain an outer visage of cleanliness and hide any suffering they might be undergoing for their piety. Some feel that anointing was something only done on special occasions, such as feasts, and that Jesus is counseling dressing up when fasting. Hill, however, notes that this would be just as ostentatious as the exaggerated suffering of the hypocrites. Imposing the discipline of denial, the disciples are told to be careful not to let it show, as John Phillips citing Campbell Morgan: "We are to have perpetual Lent in our souls and everlasting Easter in our face".

Jesus in this verse assumes that his followers will continue to fast, just as they give alms and pray. Although it is commented in Matthew 9 that Jesus and his disciples did not fast (Matthew 9:14), Jesus explains why fasting hasn't occurred during His ministry but will continue after (Matthew 9:14).

In most Christian churches, with a noted exception of The Church of Jesus Christ of Latter Day Saints, fasting no longer has a major role, though various forms of more limited deprivation, such as that of Lent, are practiced.

== Commentary from the Church Fathers ==
Glossa Ordinaria: The Lord having taught us what we ought not to do, now proceeds to teach us what we ought to do, saying, When thou fastest, anoint thy head, and wash thy face.

Augustine: A question is here wont to be raised; for none surely would literally enjoin, that, as we wash our faces from daily habit, so we should have our heads anointed when we fast; a thing which all allow to be most disgraceful.

Pseudo-Chrysostom: Also if He bade us not to be of sad countenance that we might not seem to men to fast, yet if anointing of the head and washing of the face are always observed in fasting, they will become tokens of fasting.

Jerome: But He speaks in accordance with the manners of the province of Palestine, where it is the custom on festival days to anoint the head. What He enjoins then is, that when we are fasting we should wear the appearance of joy and gladness.

Pseudo-Chrysostom: Therefore the simple interpretation of this is, that is added as an hyperbolical explanation of the command; as though He had said, Yea, so far should ye be from any display of your fasting, that if it might be (which yet it may not be) so done, ye should even do such things as are tokens of luxury and feasting.

== Sources ==
- Fowler, Harold. The Gospel of Matthew: Volume One. Joplin: College Press, 1968

Preceded by Matthew 6:16	Gospel of Matthew; Chapter 6	Succeeded by Matthew 6:18
