= Simon J. Kistemaker =

Dutch-American New Testament scholar (1930-2017)

Simon J. Kistemaker (October 21, 1930 – September 23, 2017) was a New Testament scholar. He served as Professor of New Testament at Reformed Theological Seminary. Kistemaker studied at Calvin College and Calvin Theological Seminary before obtaining a Th.D. from the Free University in Amsterdam. He served a term as president of the Evangelical Theological Society, and completed the New Testament Commentary series that was commenced by William Hendriksen. Four of Kistemaker's volumes in this series won the Gold Medallion Evangelical Book of the Year Award.

== Early life and education ==
Kistemaker was born in the Netherlands and immigrated with his family to Ontario, Canada, shortly after World War II. Demonstrating a talent for languages, he pursued higher education at Calvin College, where he was invited by President Dr. William Spoelhof to teach Latin and Greek while still a student. Kistemaker furthered his studies at Calvin Theological Seminary and the Free University of Amsterdam, earning his Doctorate of Theology in 1961.

== Career ==
Following his ordination in 1961, Kistemaker served as a pastor at the Christian Reformed Church in Vernon, British Columbia. He later joined Dordt College in Sioux Center, Iowa, as a professor of Bible and languages. In 1971, Kistemaker began his long tenure at Reformed Theological Seminary (RTS) in Jackson, Mississippi, where he taught New Testament studies until his retirement in May 1996. He was honored with emeritus status upon his retirement but continued to teach at the Orlando campus of RTS from 1996 to 2011.

== Major works and contributions ==
Kistemaker was best known for his work on the 12-volume New Testament Commentary Set originally begun by Dr. William Hendriksen. The series, which was completed in 2001 with the publication of the volume on Revelation, has been highly regarded within Reformed and evangelical scholarly circles.

== Personal life and death ==
Kistemaker was married to his wife, Jean, for 61 years, and had 7 children. He died at his home in St. Petersburg, Florida on September 23, 2017.

== Works ==
=== Books ===
- Kistemaker, Simon J. (1972). The Gospels in Current Study. Grand Rapids, MI: Baker Book House. ISBN 978-0-80105316-0. OCLC 388840.
- ——— (1980). The Parables of Jesus. Grand Rapids, MI: Baker Book House. ISBN 978-0-80105423-5. OCLC 7184611.
- ——— (1984). Epistle to the Hebrews. New Testament Commentary. Grand Rapids, MI: Baker Book House. ISBN 978-0-80105460-0. OCLC 12161528.
- ——— (1986). Epistle of James and the Epistles of John. New Testament Commentary. Grand Rapids, MI: Baker Book House. ISBN 978-0-80105469-3. OCLC 13998205.
- ——— (1987). Epistles of Peter and of the Epistle of Jude. New Testament Commentary. Grand Rapids, MI: Baker Book House. ISBN 978-0-80105484-6. OCLC 17451767.
- ——— (1990). Acts of the Apostles. New Testament Commentary. Grand Rapids, MI: Baker Book House. ISBN 978-0-80105290-3. OCLC 23096506.
- ——— (1993). I Corinthians. New Testament Commentary. Grand Rapids, MI: Baker Book House. ISBN 0-8010-5260-2.
- ——— (1997). II Corinthians. New Testament Commentary. Grand Rapids, MI: Baker Book House. ISBN 978-0-80102105-3. OCLC 37746175.
- ——— (2001). Revelation. New Testament Commentary. Grand Rapids, MI: Baker Book House. ISBN 978-0-80102252-4. OCLC 48028660.

=== Articles & chapters ===
- Kistemaker, Simon J. (1984). "Shrewd Manager: An Exposition of Luke 16:1–9". Evangel. 2 (2): 13–14.
- ——— (1986). "Children in the Market Place". Evangel. 4 (2): 12.
- ——— (March 1986). "The Theological Message of James". Journal of the Evangelical Theological Society. 29 (1): 55–61.
