= Matthew 6:4 =

- ← 6:3 6:5 →
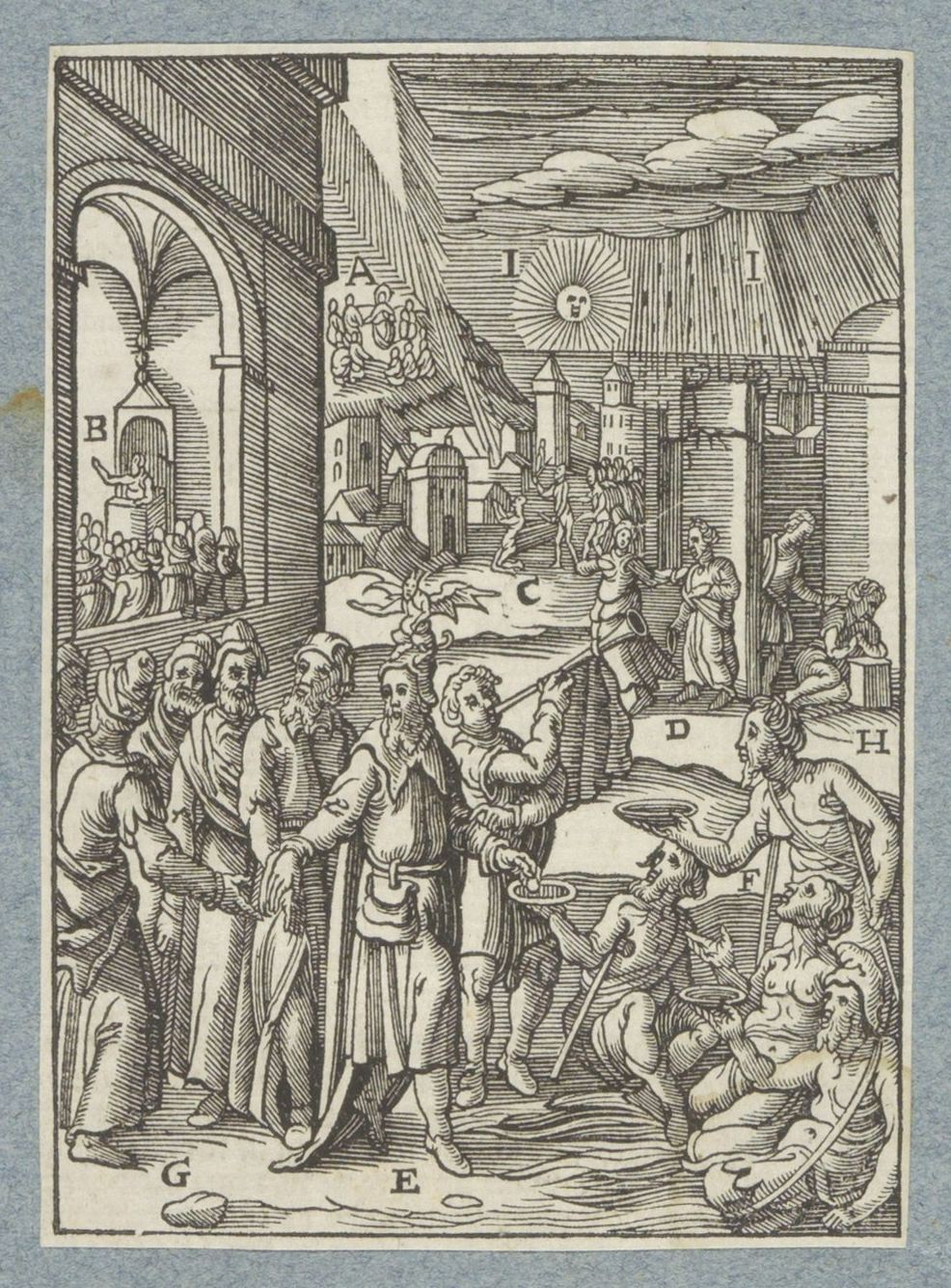
- Illustration of Matthew 6:4 "... that your alms may be in secret" by Christoffel van Sichem (1629).
- Book: Gospel of Matthew
- Christian Bible part: New Testament

Matthew 6:4 is the fourth verse of the sixth chapter of the Gospel of Matthew in the New Testament and is part of the Sermon on the Mount. This is the final verse of the Sermon's discussion of alms giving.

== Content ==
The Novum Testamentum Graece text is:

ὅπως ᾖ σου ἡ ἐλεημοσύνη ἐν τῷ κρυπτῷ
καὶ ὁ Πατήρ σου ὁ βλέπων ἐν τῷ κρυπτῷ
ἀποδώσει σοι.

The Textus Receptus adds "εν τω φανερω" (en tō phanerō, "openly") at the end of the verse. St Augustine observed that "in the Greek copies, which are earlier, we have not the word openly.

In the King James Version of the Bible the text reads:

That thine alms may be in secret: and
thy Father which seeth in secret
himself shall reward thee openly.

The World English Bible translates the passage as:

so that your merciful deeds may be
in secret, then your Father who sees
in secret will reward you openly.

Most English versions omit "openly" at the end of the verse.

== Analysis ==
The previous verses indicated that charitable giving should be in secret, perhaps even from oneself. This verse indicates that God will see even the most covert actions, and will ensure they are properly rewarded, because it is not whether one gives alms but how. This is akin to the Jewish teaching: "One who gives charity in secret is greater than Moses" (T. Bab. Bava Bathra, fol. 9. 2.).

The verses 2–4 with verses 5–6 and verses 16–18 form three neatly symmetrical illustrations, about alms, prayer and fasting. The acts of justice, including giving alms, and like prayer and fasting, are between God and the doer, unlike Roman philanthropy, which tends to have public displays of good works.

== Commentary from the Church Fathers ==
Pseudo-Chrysostom: For it is impossible that God should leave in obscurity any good work of man; but He makes it manifest in this world, and glorifies it in the next world, because it is the glory of God; as likewise the Devil manifests evil, in which is shown the strength of his great wickedness. But God properly makes public every good deed only in that world the goods of which are not common to the righteous and the wicked; therefore to whomsoever God shall there show favour, it will be manifest that it was as reward of his righteousness. But the reward of virtue is not manifested in this world, in which both bad and good are alike in their fortunes.

Chrysostom: If therefore you desire spectators of your good deeds, behold you have not merely Angels and Archangels, but the God of the universe.

== Sources ==
- Allison, Dale C. Jr. (2007). "57. Matthew". In Barton, John; Muddiman, John (eds.). The Oxford Bible Commentary (first (paperback) ed.). Oxford University Press. pp. 844–886. ISBN 978-0199277186.
- Coogan, Michael David (2007). Coogan, Michael David; Brettler, Marc Zvi; Newsom, Carol Ann; Perkins, Pheme (eds.). The New Oxford Annotated Bible with the Apocryphal/Deuterocanonical Books: New Revised Standard Version, Issue 48 (Augmented 3rd ed.). Oxford University Press. ISBN 9780195288810.
- France, R. T. (1994). "Matthew". In Carson, D. A.; France, R. T.; Motyer, J. A.; Wenham, G. J. (eds.). New Bible Commentary: 21st Century Edition (4, illustrated, reprint, revised ed.). Inter-Varsity Press. pp. 904–945. ISBN 9780851106489.

Preceded by Matthew 6:3	Gospel of Matthew; Chapter 6	Succeeded by Matthew 6:5
