= Matthew 5:48 =

- ← 5:47 6:1 →
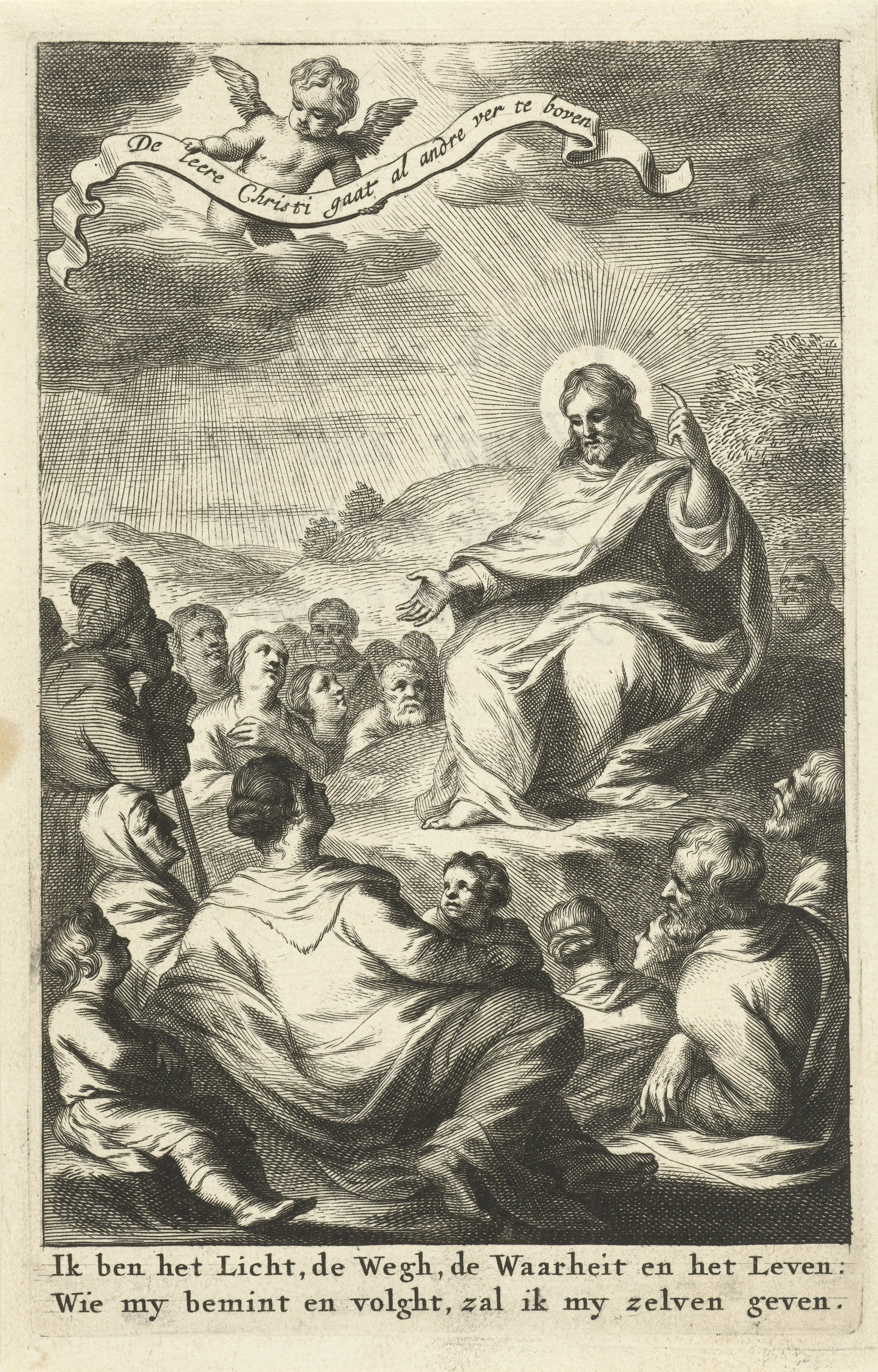
- "Sermon on the Mount" (De Bergrede). Book illustration from Thomas à Kempis (translator: Jurriaen Bouckart ), De vier boeken der naarvolging Christi, Jacob Lescailje (publisher), Amsterdam 1663.
- Book: Gospel of Matthew
- Christian Bible part: New Testament

Matthew 5:48 is the forty-eighth and final verse of the fifth chapter of the Gospel of Matthew in the New Testament and is part of the Sermon on the Mount. This is the final verse of the final antithesis, and it is a summary of Jesus' earlier teachings.

== Text ==
In the King James Version of the Bible, the text reads:

Be ye therefore perfect, even as your Father which is in heaven is perfect.

The World English Bible translates the passage as:

Therefore you shall be perfect, just as your Father in heaven is perfect.

The Common English Bible uses the word "complete" instead of "perfect".

The Novum Testamentum Graece text is:

Ἔσεσθε οὖν ὑμεῖς τέλειοι ὡς ὁ Πατὴρ ὑμῶν ὁ οὐράνιος τέλειός ἐστιν.

== Interpretations ==
The formulation of this verse is known as the Imitatio Dei; a similar verse appears in Luke 6:36. The verse might be modeled on Leviticus 19:2, which says in the King James Version:

"Speak unto all the congregation of the children of Israel, and say unto them, You shall be holy: for I the LORD your God am holy."

There is some debate about the meaning of the injunction to be "perfect", since orthodox Christianity teaches that creatures cannot achieve God's level of perfection.

The term rendered "perfect" in most English translations is τέλειοι (téleioi), the same word used in the Septuagint for תָּמִים (tamím) and meaning "brought to its end, finished; lacking nothing necessary to completeness". According to Albert Barnes, "Originally, it is applied to a piece of mechanism, as a machine that is complete in its parts. Applied to people, it refers to completeness of parts, or perfection, where no part is defective or wanting." Some link the Gospel's use of the term with its use by the Greek philosophers. To them something was perfect if it fully had its intended function.

One commentary offers, "Manifestly, our Lord here speaks, not of degrees of excellence, but of the kind of excellence which was to distinguish His disciples and characterize His kingdom. When therefore He adds, even as your Father which is in heaven is perfect—He refers to that full-orbed glorious completeness which is in the great Divine Model, 'their Father which is in heaven.'" Other scholars believe that Jesus is here setting a goal that is certain to be impossible, so that we will realize this and be humble. The pursuit of perfection is important, even if the attainment of it impossible.

Another view is that this is a limited form of perfection that is being asked. Fowler notes that elsewhere in the New Testament, it is stated that those who believe in Jesus and rely fully upon him for all things is perfect. In Jewish scripture, certain individuals such as Noah (Genesis 6:9) and Abraham are referred to as perfect because of their obedience to God. In these passages perfect is used as a synonym for complete, and perfect obedience to God is simply complete obedience to God. Barclay argues that the previous verses made clear that man's function is to love, and anyone who does that absolutely can be considered perfect. Similarly, John Gill notes that "this perfection is to be restrained to the subject Christ is upon, love to men, and not to be referred to any, or every other thing". The Qumran followers described themselves as the followers of the "perfect way", in that they were followers of what they believed was perfect dedication to God.

The Cambridge Bible for Schools and Colleges synthesizes several approaches:

Either (1) in reference to a future state, “if ye have this true love or charity ye shall be perfect hereafter;” or (2) the future has an imperative force, and perfect is limited by the preceding words = perfect in respect of love, i. e. “love your enemies as well as your neighbours,” because your Father being perfect in respect of love does this.

== Commentary from the Church Fathers ==
Saint Remigius: Because the utmost perfection of love cannot go beyond the love of enemies, therefore as soon as the Lord has bid us love our enemies, He proceeds, Be ye then perfect, as your Father which is in heaven is perfect. He indeed is perfect, as being omnipotent; man, as being aided by the Omnipotent. For the word ‘as’ is used in Scripture, sometimes for identity, and equality, as in that, As I was with Moses, so will I be with thee; (Josh. 1:5.) sometimes to express likeness only as here.

Pseudo-Chrysostom: For as our sons after the flesh resemble their fathers in some part of their bodily shape, so do spiritual sons resemble their father God, in holiness.

St John Chrysostom compares the "old law" with this new one: "Let [us] examine attentively ... the different periods of time, and the persons to whom it was given; and he will admire the wisdom of the divine Legislator, and clearly perceive that it is one and the same Lord, and that each law was to the great advantage of mankind, and wisely adapted to the times of their promulgation. For, if among the first principles of rectitude, these sublime and eminent truths had been found, perhaps neither these, nor the less perfect rules of morality would have been observed; whereas, by disposing of both in their proper time, the divine wisdom has employed both for the correction of the world."

== Later usage ==
The Second Vatican Council's Decree on the Ministry and Life of Priests states that, while all Christians "can and must seek for perfection, according to the exhortation of Christ" in this verse, priests "are bound" through their ordination "to acquire that perfection in special fashion".

Preceded by Matthew 5:47	Gospel of Matthew; Chapter 5	Succeeded by Matthew 6:1
