= William Hendriksen =

American Calvinist theologian (1900–1982)

- Born: 18 November 1900; Tiel, Gelderland
- Died: 12 January 1982 (aged 81); Grandville, Michigan
- Occupations: Professor, minister, writer
- Title: Professor of New Testament at Calvin Theological Seminary

Academic background
- Education: Calvin College, Calvin Theological Seminary, Pike's Peak Bible Seminary and Princeton Theological Seminary (Ph.D.)

Academic work
- Discipline: Biblical studies
- Sub-discipline: New Testament studies
- Institutions: Calvin Theological Seminary First CRC of Byron Center

William Hendriksen (18 November 1900 – 12 January 1982) was a Dutch-born American minister, New Testament scholar, and writer of Bible commentaries.

== Life and career ==
Hendriksen was born in Tiel, Gelderland, but his family moved to Kalamazoo, Michigan in 1911. Hendriksen studied at Calvin College and Calvin Theological Seminary before obtaining an S.T.D. degree from Pikes Peak Bible Seminary, as was typical for on-the-job pastors seeking doctorates in the 1930s and 1940s. It is there that he wrote the thesis More than Conquerors. This book has never gone off the market since it was privately printed and Herman Baker issued it as the first publication of the new Baker Book House in 1940. He received a Th.D. from Princeton Theological Seminary.

Hendriksen was an ordained minister in the Christian Reformed Church and served as Professor of New Testament at Calvin Theological Seminary from 1942 to 1952. He was pastor of First Christian Reformed Church of Byron Center, MI from 1952 to 1961. He started the New Testament Commentary, completing commentaries on more than half of the New Testament books. This series was published by Baker and completed by Simon Kistemaker after Hendriksen's death. Hendriksen was awarded a posthumous Gold Medallion Book Award for his commentary on Romans. He also translated the Book of Revelation for the New International Version. His granddaughter Dawn Wolthuis has served as President of the Institute for Christian Studies.

In his influential work Israel and Prophecy, written a year after the 1967 war, and still in print, Hendriksen criticized the view, held by dispensationalists and Christian Zionists, that the Bible prophesies the return and restoration of the Jews to the land of Israel. Dispensationalist pastor Barry Horner describes Hendriksen's work as "a classic representation of replacement theology".

Hendriksen has been described as "one of the leading and most respected of New Testament commentators."

== New Testament Commentaries ==
- New Testament Commentary: Matthew
- New Testament Commentary: Mark
- New Testament Commentary: Luke
- New Testament Commentary: John
- New Testament Commentary: Romans
- New Testament Commentary: Galatians and Ephesians
- New Testament Commentary: Philippians, Colossians, and Philemon
- New Testament Commentary: 1 & 2 Thessalonians, 1 & 2 Timothy, and Titus
