= New Testament amulet =

Religious item

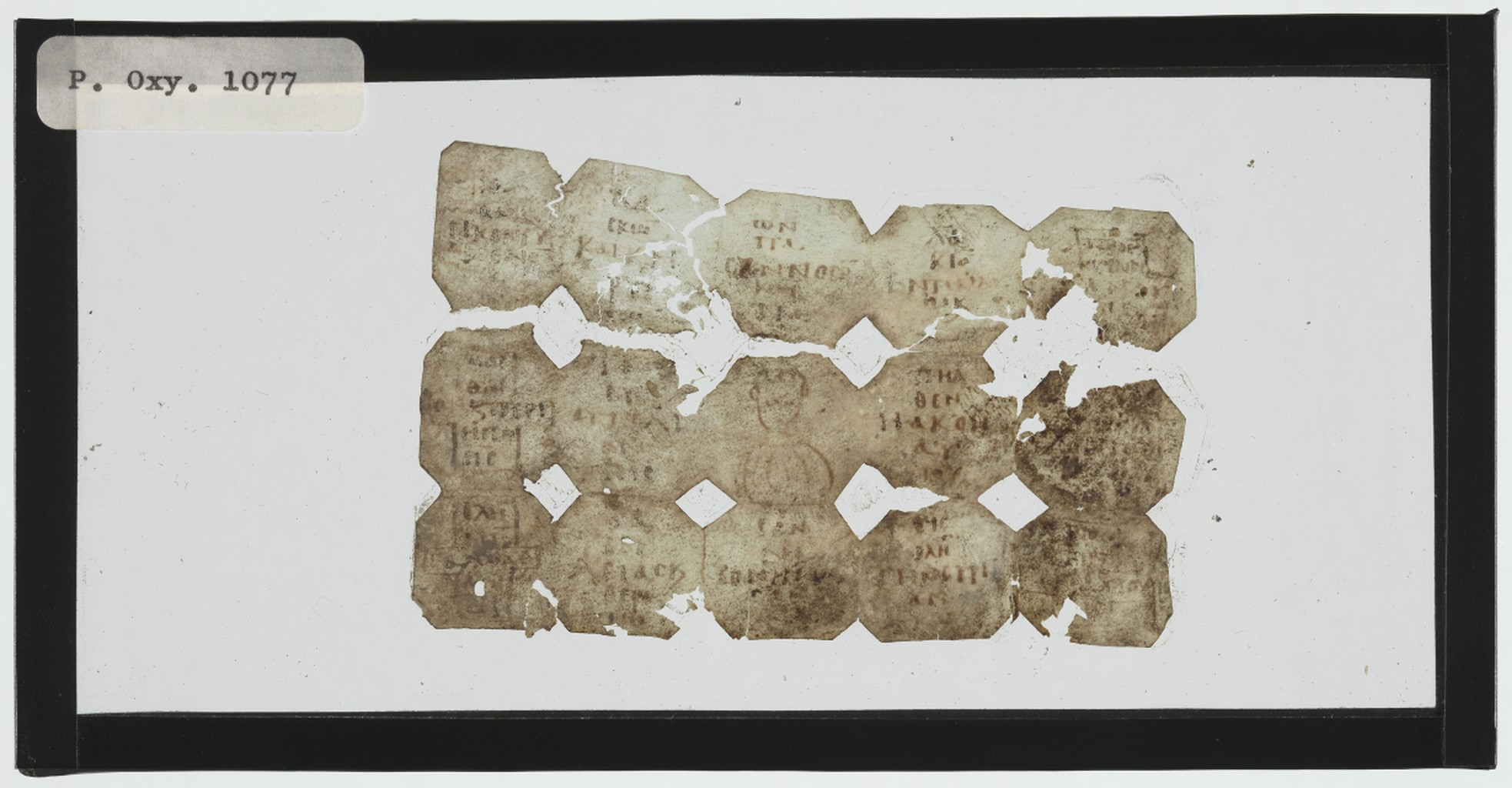
𝔗^{2}, Special Collections and Archives, Trexler Library. Muhlenberg College.

A New Testament amulet (also called a talisman) is an ancient hand-written portion of the New Testament, commonly worn as a charm. The Lord's Prayer is the most common text found on amulets. Also commonly found are the opening verses of each of the four New Testament gospels.

The numbering system begun by Ernst von Dobschütz for New Testament Greek Amulets assigned each recovered Amulet a Blackletter character 𝔗 (indicating Talisman) followed by a superscript number. Von Dobschütz continued the list through 𝔗^{9}. The additional numbers assigned below continue this numbering in the order suggested by Brice C. Jones.

- Digital images are referenced with direct links to the hosting web pages. The quality and accessibility of the images is as follows:

Gold color indicates high resolution color images available online.
Light gray color indicates black/white or microfilm images available online.
Light pink color indicates amulet destroyed.

== List of New Testament Amulets ==
Dobs.#	Date	Contents	Script	Material	Publication	Owner	City, State	Country	Images
𝔗^{1} = 0152	4th	Matthew 6:11–13	ΑΩ	Ostrakon		National Archaeological Museum, Inv. 12227	Athens	Greece	
𝔗^{2}	6th–7th	Matthew 4:23–24	ΑΩ	Parchment	The Oxyrhynchus Papyri, Vol. VIII 1077	Trexler Library, Muhlenberg College, T 888.01 O98; P.oxy.1077	Allentown, PA	USA	MC, BJ
𝔗^{3}	6th	Matthew 1:1; 6:9–13; John 1:1	ΑΩ	Papyrus	Heidnisches und Christliches aus Ägypten				
𝔗^{4}	6th	Matthew 1:1; 6:9; Mark 1:1–2; Luke 1:1; John 1:1	ΑΩ/αω	Papyrus	Papiri greci e latini	Laurentian Library, PSI VI 719	Florence	Italy	BML
𝔗^{5}	8th	Matthew 6:9–13	ΑΩ	Wood tablet		University of Heidelberg, Egyptian Collection, Inv. 761; P.Bad. 4.60	Heidelberg	Germany	p.249
𝔗^{6}	5th–6th	Matthew 6:9–13; Luke 9:37; 11:1b-2	ΑΩ	Papyrus	Papyri Iandanae	University of Giessen, P.Iand. 1.6	Gießen, Hesse	Germany	UoG
𝔗^{7}	14th	Matthew 6:9–13; Mark 1:1–8, Luke 1:1–7; John 1:1–17	αω	Parchment	A Descriptive Catalogue of Greek New Testament...	The University of Chicago Library, Ms. 125 (Goodspeed)	Chicago, IL	USA	TUOCL
𝔗^{7}	14th	Matthew 6:9–13; Mark 1:1–8, Luke 1:1–7; John 1:1–17	αω	Parchment	A Descriptive Catalogue of Greek New Testament...	Pierpont Morgan Library, Ms. M. 499	New York, NY	USA	PML
𝔗^{8}	5th–6th	John 2:1a-2; Romans 12:1–2	ΑΩ	Papyrus	Die Leipziger Papyrusfragmente der Psalmen	Austrian National Library, G 3212	Vienna	Austria	ANL
𝔗^{9}	5th	John 1:1, 3	ΑΩ	Papyrus	The Oxyrhynchus Papyri, vol. VIII	University of Glasgow, P. Oxy. 1151	Glasgow	UK	OP
𝔗^{10}	5th–6th	Matthew 1:1; 4:23; Mark 1:1; Luke 1:1; John 1:1–2	ΑΩ	Parchment	Altchristliche Texte im Berliner Museum	Berlin State Museums, P. 6096	Berlin	Germany	BerlPap
𝔗^{11}	5th–6th	Matthew 4:23/9:35; Matthew 8:15/Mark 1:31	ΑΩ	Papyrus	Vier Berliner Zaubertexte	Berlin State Museums, P. 21230	Berlin	Germany	BerlPap
𝔗^{12}	5th–6th	Matthew 6:9, 11	ΑΩ	Papyrus	Papyri in the Princeton University Collections	Princeton University Library, P.Princ. 2.107	Princeton, NJ	USA	PUL
𝔗^{13}	6th–7th	Matthew 6:9–13	ΑΩ	Papyrus	A Greek Papyrus Amulet…	Duke University, P.Duke inv. 778	Durham, NC	USA	DU
𝔗^{14} = 0324	5th	Matthew 6:4–6, 8–12	ΑΩ	Parchment	Columbia Papyri XI	Columbia University, P.Col. 11.293	New York, NY	USA	CU
𝔗^{15}	6th–8th	Matthew 6:9–13	ΑΩ/αω	Papyrus	The Lord’s Prayer and ΧΜΓ	Yale University, P.CtYBR inv. 4600	New Haven, CT	USA	YU
𝔗^{16}	4th–5th	Matthew 6:9–13; 2 Corinthians 13:13?	ΑΩ	Papyrus	Christian Papyri from the Oslo Collection	University of Oslo, P.Oslo inv. 1644	Oslo	Norway	
𝔗^{16}	4th–5th	Matthew 6:9–13; 2 Corinthians 13:13?	ΑΩ	Papyrus	Christian Papyri from the Oslo Collection	Schøyen Collection, MS 244/4	Oslo	Norway	
𝔗^{17}	3rd–4th	Matthew 6:10–12	ΑΩ	Papyrus	The Antinoopolis Papyri, pt. 2	Sackler Library, P.Ant. 2.54	Oxford	UK	p.233
𝔗^{18}	6th	Matthew 6:11–13	ΑΩ	Papyrus	Kölner Papyri	University of Cologne, P.Köln 8.336	Cologne	Germany	UOC
𝔗^{19}	5th	Matthew 6:11–13	ΑΩ	Papyrus	Kölner Papyri	University of Cologne, P.Köln 4.171	Cologne	Germany	UOC
𝔗^{20} = 𝔓^{105}	5th–6th	Matthew 27:62–64; 28:2–5	ΑΩ	Papyrus	The Oxyrhynchus Papyri, vol. LXIV	Papyrology Rooms, Sackler Library, P. Oxy. 4406	Oxford	UK	OP, CSNTM, INTF
𝔗^{21}	3rd–4th	Mark 1:1–2	ΑΩ	Papyrus	The Oxyrhynchus Papyri, vol. LXXVI	Papyrology Rooms, Sackler Library, P. Oxy. 5073	Oxford	UK	OP
𝔗^{22}	5th–6th	John 1:1–12	ΑΩ	Papyrus	Kölner Papyri	University of Cologne, P.Köln 8.340	Cologne	Germany	UOC
𝔗^{23}	6th–7th	John 1:5–6	ΑΩ	Parchment	Griechische literarische Papyri christlichen Inhaltes II, vol. 1	Austrian National Library, G 29831	Vienna	Austria	ANL
𝔗^{24}	6th–7th	John 1:29, 49	ΑΩ	Papyrus	Ein apokryphes Evangelienfragment	Berlin State Museums, Inv. 11710	Berlin	Germany	BerlPap
𝔗^{25}	6th	2 Corinthians 10:4; 1 Thessalonians 5:8/Ephesians 6:16	ΑΩ	Papyrus	Die Leipziger Papyrusfragmente der Psalmen	Austrian National Library, G 26034 + 30453	Vienna	Austria	ANL
𝔗^{26} = 0262	7th	1 Timothy 1:15–16	ΑΩ/αω	Parchment	Neue neutestamentliche Fragmente der Berliner Papyrussammlung	Berlin State Museums, P. 13977	Berlin	Germany	BerlPap, INTF, CSNTM
𝔗^{27} = 𝔓^{78}	3rd–4th	Jude 4–5, 7–8	ΑΩ	Papyrus	The Oxyrhynchus Papyri, Vol. XXIV	Papyrology Rooms, Sackler Library, P. Oxy. 2684	Oxford	UK	OP CSNTM, INTF
𝔗^{28}	4th–5th	Colossians 3:9–10	ΑΩ	Papyrus	A Christian Amulet Containing Colossians 3:9–10	Petrie Egyptian Museum, UC 32070	London	UK	PEM
𝔗^{29}	3rd–4th	Acts 9:1	ΑΩ	Papyrus	An Amulet Containing Acts 9:1	Cadbury Research Library, University of Birmingham	Birmingham	UK	
𝔗^{30}	5th–6th	Matthew 1:20	ΑΩ	Papyrus	A Greek Papyrus Fragment with a Citation of Matthew 1:20	University of Michigan, P.Mich. inv. 4944b	Ann Arbor, MI	USA	BJ
𝔗^{31}	5th–6th	Mt 1:1; Mk 1:1; Jn 1:1	ΑΩ	Papyrus		Bibliotheca Alexandrina Antiquities Museum, BAAM 0505	Alexandria	USA	

== See also ==
=== Other lists of New Testament manuscripts ===
- List of New Testament papyri
- List of New Testament uncials
- List of New Testament minuscules
- List of New Testament lectionaries
- List of New Testament Latin manuscripts
- List of New Testament Church Fathers
- List of the Syriac New Testament manuscripts

=== Other articles ===
- List of Egyptian papyri by date
- Novum Testamentum Graece
- Palaeography
- Biblical manuscript
- Textual criticism
