= Epiousion =

Greek adjective used in the Lord's Prayer

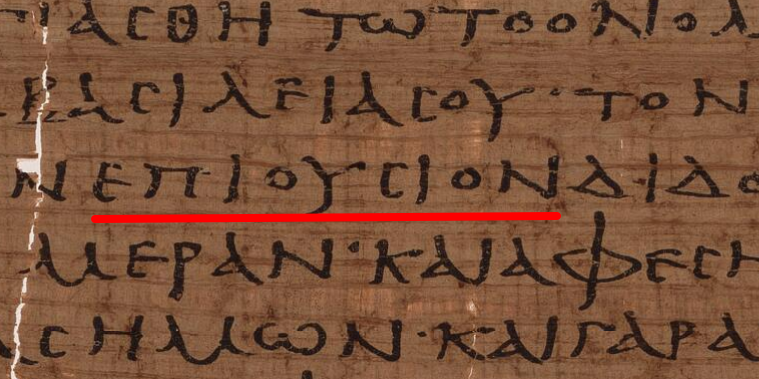
EPIOUSION (ΕΠΙΟΥϹΙΟΝ) in the Gospel of Luke, as written in Papyrus 75 (c. 200 CE)

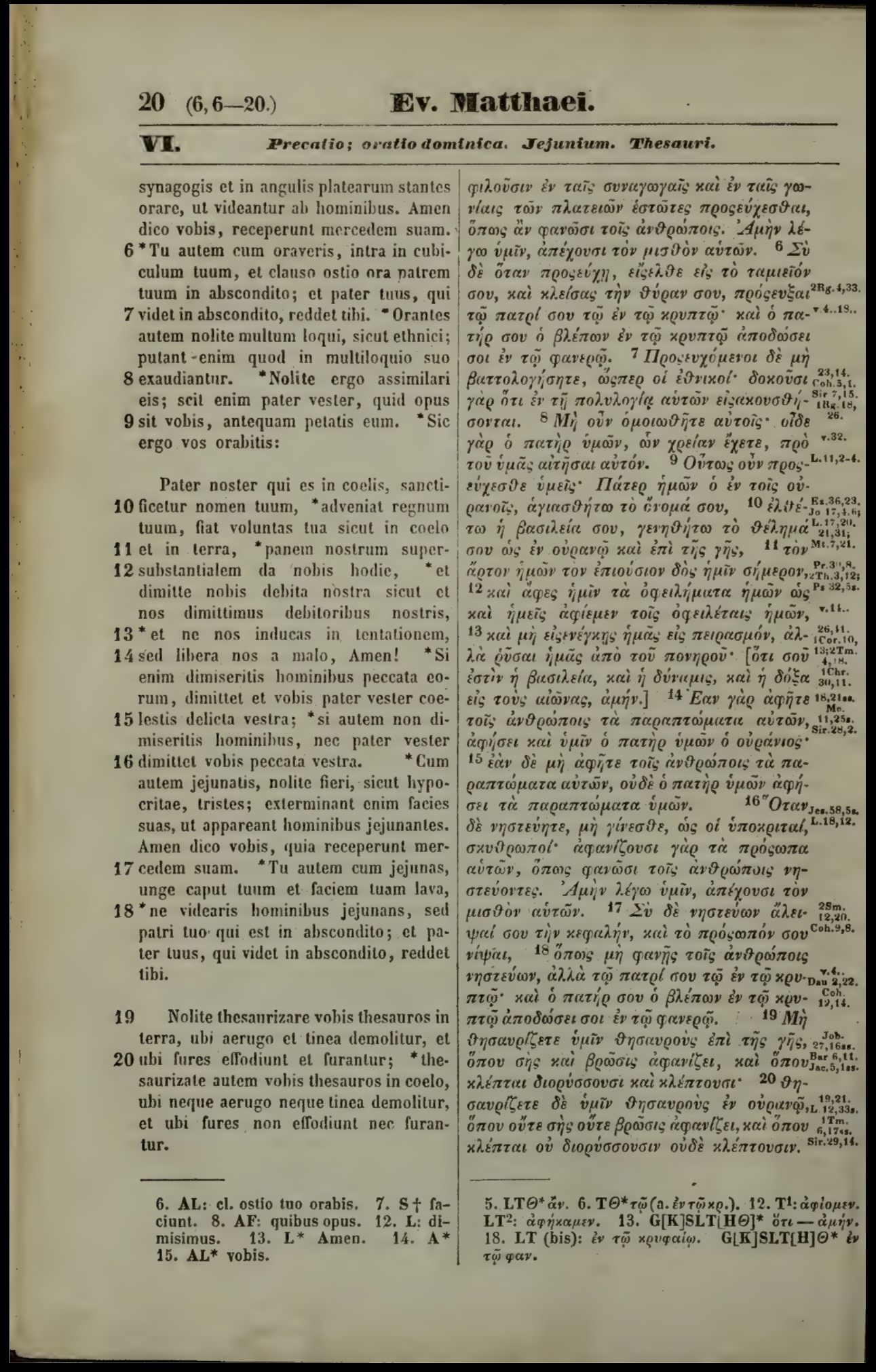
Page 20 of Novum Testamentum Polyglotton (1866), showing Matthew 6:9–13 with parallel Greek, Latin, German, and English texts containing ἐπιούσιον.

Epiousion (ἐπιούσιον) is a Koine Greek adjective used in the Lord's Prayer verse "Τὸν ἄρτον ἡμῶν τὸν ἐπιούσιον δὸς ἡμῖν σήμερον" (Note: Transliteration: Tòn árton hēmôn tòn epioúsion dòs hēmîn sḗmeron) ('Give us today our epiousion bread'). Because the word is used nowhere else, its meaning is unclear. It is traditionally translated as "daily", but most modern scholars reject that interpretation. The word is also referred to by epiousios, its presumed lemma form.

Since it is a Koine Greek tris legomenon (a word that occurs only thrice within a given corpus) found only in the New Testament passages Matthew 6:11 and Luke 11:3 and in the early Christian treatise Didache, but always in the same context of relaying the Lord's Prayer, its interpretation relies upon morphological analysis and context. The traditional and most common English translation is daily, although most scholars today reject this in part because all other New Testament passages with the translation "daily" include the word hemera (ἡμέρᾱ, 'day').

The Catechism of the Catholic Church holds that there are several ways of understanding epiousion (which the Catechism calls epiousios), including the traditional 'daily', but most literally as 'supersubstantial' or 'superessential', based on its morphological components. Alternative theories are that—aside from the etymology of ousia, meaning 'substance'—it may be derived from either of the verbs einai (εἶναι), meaning "to be", or ienai (ἰέναι), meaning both "to come" and "to go".

A majority of scholars today believe that epiousion probably meant "for tomorrow" or "for the future".

== Appearances and uniqueness ==
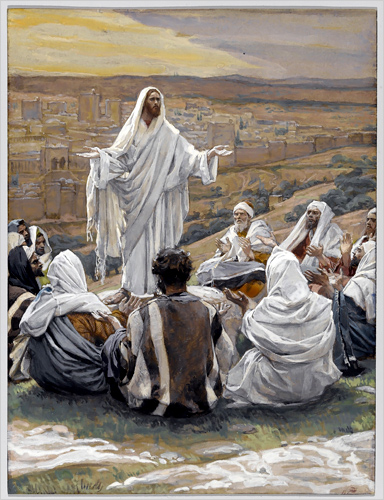
Jesus teaching the Lord's Prayer to his disciples, as imagined by James Tissot (late 19th century).

The word is visible in the Hanna Papyrus 1 (𝔓^{75}), the oldest surviving witness for certain New Testament passages.

Epiousion is the only adjective in the Lord's Prayer. It is masculine, accusative, singular, agreeing in gender, number, and case with the noun it qualifies, ἄρτον, arton ("bread"). In an interlinear gloss:

Τὸν ἄρτον ἡμῶν τὸν ἐπιούσιον δὸς ἡμῖν σήμερον
The bread our the epiousion-one give us today
"Give us today our epiousion bread"

In the 20th century, another supposed instance appeared to come to light. In an Egyptian papyrus dated to the 5th century CE which contains a shopping list, a word transcribed as epiousi was reported as being next to the names of several grocery items. This seemed to indicate that it was used in the sense of "enough for today", "enough for tomorrow", or "necessary". However, after the papyrus containing the shopping list, missing for many years, was rediscovered at the Yale Beinecke Library in 1998, a re-examination found the word elaiou (oil), not epiousi (the original transcriber, A. H. Sayce, was apparently known to be a poor transcriber). In addition, the document was reassessed to date from the first or second century CE, not the 5th century.

Epiousei, used in Acts 7:26 and elsewhere to refer to the next day, may be a cognate word.

== Translations and interpretations ==
There are several reasons that epiousion presents an exceptional translation challenge. The word appears nowhere else in other Ancient Greek texts, and so may have been coined by the authors of the Gospel. Jesus probably did not originally compose the prayer in Greek, but in his native language, but the consensus view is that the New Testament was originally written in Koine Greek. This implies the probability of language interpretation (i.e., spoken Aramaic to written Greek) at the outset of recording the Gospel. Thus, the meaning of any such word is often difficult to determine, because cross-references and comparisons with other usages are not possible, except by morphological analysis.

The most popular morphological analysis sees prefix epi- and a polysemantic word ousia even though that does not follow the standard Greek form of building compound words. Usually the iota at the end of epi would be dropped in a compound whose second word starts with a vowel (compare, e. g., eponym vs epigraph). This is not an absolute rule, however: Jean Carmignac has collected 26 compound words that violate it. Alternatively, the word may be analyzed as a feminine participle from two different verbs.

=== "Daily" ===
Daily has long been the most common English translation of epiousion. It is the term used in the Tyndale Bible, the King James Version, and in the most popular modern English versions. This rests on the analysis of epi as for and ousia as being; the word would mean "for the [day] being" with day being implicit.

This version is based on the Latin rendering of epiousion as quotidianum, rather than the alternative Latin translation of supersubstantialem. This quotidianum interpretation is first recorded in the works of Tertullian, and is the translation found in the Tridentine Mass.

Some translators have proposed slight variations on daily as the most accurate. Richard Francis Weymouth, an English schoolmaster, translated it as "bread for today" in the Weymouth New Testament. Edgar J. Goodspeed in An American Translation used "bread for the day." Another option is to view epiousion as an allusion to Exodus 16:4 where God promises to provide a day's portion of manna every day. This verse could be an attempt to translate the Hebrew of "bread sufficient to the day" into Greek.

The importance of having daily food is mentioned in James 2:15. Here the word ephēmerou is used to describe the food.

Today, most scholars reject the translation of epiousion as meaning daily. The word daily only has a weak connection to any proposed etymologies for epiousion. Moreover, all other instances of "daily" in the English New Testament translate hemera (ἡμέρα, "day"), which does not appear in this usage. Because there are several other Greek words based on hemera that mean daily, no reason is apparent to use such an obscure word as epiousion. The daily translation also makes the term redundant, with "this day" already making clear the bread is for the current day.

=== "Supersubstantial" ===
In the Vulgate Jerome translated epiousion in Matthew 6:11 as supersubstantial (Latin: supersubstantialem), coining a new word not before seen in Latin. This came from the analysis of the prefix epi- as super and ousia in the sense of substance. The Catholic Church believes that this, or superessential, is the most literal English translation via Latin, which lacks a grammatical form for being, the literal translation of the Greek ousia, and so substance or essence was used instead.

==== Advocates ====
This interpretation was supported by early writers such as Augustine, Cyril of Jerusalem, Cyprian of Carthage and John Cassian.

This translation is used by some modern Bibles. In the Douay-Rheims Bible English translation of the Vulgate (Matthew 6:11) reads "give us this day our supersubstantial bread". The translation of supersubstantial bread has also been associated with the Eucharist, as early as in the time of the Church Fathers and later also by the Council of Trent (1551).

In 1979, the Nova Vulgata, also called the Neo-Vulgate, became the official Latin edition of the Bible published by the Holy See for use in the contemporary Roman rite. It is not an edition of the historical Vulgate, but a revision of the text intended to accord with modern critical Hebrew and Greek texts and produce a style closer to classical Latin. The Nova Vulgata retains the same correspondence-of-meaning for epiousion in the Lord's Prayer contained in the Gospel according to Matthew and Luke as in the Vulgate, i.e., supersubstantialem and quotidianum.

According to the Catechism of the Catholic Church, there are several meanings to epiousios, and that epi-ousios is most literally translated as super-essential:

"Daily" (epiousios) occurs nowhere else in the New Testament. Taken in a temporal sense, this word is a pedagogical repetition of "this day," to confirm us in trust "without reservation." Taken in the qualitative sense, it signifies what is necessary for life, and more broadly every good thing sufficient for subsistence. Taken literally (epi-ousios: "super-essential"), it refers directly to the Bread of Life, the Body of Christ, the "medicine of immortality," without which we have no life within us. Finally in this connection, its heavenly meaning is evident: "this day" is the Day of the Lord, the day of the feast of the kingdom, anticipated in the Eucharist that is already the foretaste of the kingdom to come. For this reason it is fitting for the Eucharistic liturgy to be celebrated each day.

In the Eastern Orthodox Church, "supersubstantial" is thought to be a more accurate translation. Here is how Father Thomas Hopko of Saint Vladimir's Seminary in New York explains it:

epiousios [...] [is] an absolutely unique word. Etymologically [...], epi- means "on top of" and -ousios means "substance" or "being". So it means suprasubstantial bread. Suprasubstantial bread: more-than-necessary bread. In the first Latin translation of the Lord's Prayer, done by Jerome it was [...], panem supersubstantialem. Somewhere along the way it became "cotidianum, daily". Luther translated "daily" from the beginning: tägliches Brot. But in all languages that traditionally Eastern Christians use—Greek, Slavonic, and all the Arabic languages: Aramaic, Arabic—it doesn't say that; it just says a word that's similar to that [...] How do they translate it [into those languages]? [...] they claim that the best translation would be: "Give us today the bread of tomorrow". Give us today the bread of the coming age, the bread that when you eat it, you can never die. What is the food of the coming age? It's God himself, God's word, God's Son, God's lamb, God's bread, which we already have here on earth, on earth, before the second coming. So what we're really saying is, "Feed us today with the bread of the coming age", because we are taught by Jesus not to seek the bread that perishes, but the bread that, you eat it, you can never die.

==== Eucharist metaphor ====
This translation has often been connected to the eucharist. The bread necessary for existence is the communion bread of the Last Supper. That the gospel writers needed to create a new word indicates to Eugene LaVerdiere, an American Catholic priest and biblical scholar of the post-Vatican II era, that they are describing something new. Eating the communion bread at the Last Supper created the need for a new word for this new concept.

Supersubstantial was the dominant Latin translation of epiousion from Matthew for many centuries after Jerome, and influenced church ritual. It was the basis for the argument advanced by theologians such as Cyprian that communion must be eaten daily. That only bread is mentioned led to the practice of giving the laity only the bread and not the wine of the Eucharist. This verse was cited in arguments against the Utraquists. The translation was reconsidered with the Protestant Reformation. Martin Luther originally kept supersubstantial but switched to daily by 1528.

==== Criticisms ====
Those rejecting this translation include some Roman Catholic Biblical scholars, such as Raymond E. Brown, Jean Carmignac, and Nicholas Ayo.

There is no known source word from Aramaic or Hebrew, the native languages of Jesus, that translates into the Greek word epiousion. In fact, there is no word in either of these languages that easily translates as supersubstantial, a unique translation for a unique Greek word.

M. Eugene Boring, a Protestant theologian at Texas Christian University, claims that the connection with the Eucharist is ahistoric because he thinks that the ritual only developed some time after the Gospel was written and that the author of Matthew does not seem to have any knowledge of or interest in the Eucharist. Craig Blomberg, also a Protestant New Testament scholar, agrees that these "concepts had yet to be introduced when Jesus gave his original prayer and therefore could not have been part of his original meaning."

=== "Necessary for existence" ===
Another interpretation is to link epiousion to the Greek word ousia meaning both the verb to be and the noun substance. Origen was the first writer to comment on the unusual word. A native Greek speaker writing a century and half after the Gospels were composed, he did not recognize the word and thought it was an original neologism. Origen thought "bread necessary for existence" was the most likely meaning, connecting it to the to be translation of ousia.

George Ricker Berry translated the word as simply "necessary" in 1897. Philosopher Raïssa Maritain, wife of philosopher Jacques Maritain, writes that during her era of the 1940s this translation was found to be the most acceptable by modern scholars. Her own conclusion was stated as being in agreement with Theodore of Mopsuestia, that being the "bread we need." This was seen as vague enough to cover what was viewed as the three possible etymological meanings: (1) literal – the "bread of tomorrow or the bread of the present day," (2) analogical – the "bread we need in order to subsist," and (3) spiritual/mystical – the bread "which is above our substance" (i.e., supersubstantial).

Joseph Fitzmyer translates the verse as "give us this day our bread for subsistence." He connects this to the Aramaic targum translations of Proverbs 30:8.

Like daily, this translation also has the problem that there are well known Greek words that could have been used instead.

=== "For the future" ===
A majority of scholars today believe that epiousion meant "for tomorrow" or "for the future". Early supporters of this translation include Cyril of Alexandria and Peter of Laodicea by way of linking epiousion with the word epiousa (ἐπιοῦσα), meaning "next" or "following" (as in "the next day (or night)", and with the related verb epienai, "coming in the future." According to Jewish theologian Herbert Basser, this translation was also considered (but eventually rejected) as a possibility by Jerome, who noted it as an aside in his commentary to Matthew that the now lost Gospel of the Hebrews used ma[h]ar ("for tomorrow") in this verse.

Raymond E. Brown claims it is also indicated by early Bohairic and Sahidic sources. Referencing epiousei in Acts 7:26, the Lutheran theologian Albert Schweitzer, reintroduced this translation in modern times. A "for the future" reading leads to a cluster of related translations, including: "bread for tomorrow," "bread for the future," and "bread for the coming day."

The word epiouse (επιούση) is found in Acts 7:26, 16:11, 20:15, 21:18 and 23:11. It has been suggested that epiousios is a feminised version of epiouse.

Beyond the literal meaning, this translation can also be read in an eschatological context: "the petition for an anticipation of the world to come." Others see tomorrow being referenced to the end times and the bread that of the messianic feast. Raymond Brown argues that all the other phrases of the Lord's Prayer are eschatological, so it would be incongruous for this phrase to be speaking prosaically about bread for eating. Eduard Schweizer, a Swiss Protestant New Testament scholar and theologian, disagrees. Humble bread was not traditionally presented as part of the messianic feast and the prosaic need for bread to survive would have been a universal sentiment of Jesus' followers.

The Catholic theologian Brant Pitre acknowledges the "for the future'" interpretation is held by a majority of scholars, but criticizes it for lacking support among ancient Christian interpreters. Pitre also cites that an adjectival form for "tomorrow" exists in ancient Greek, αὔριον in Matthew 6:34, and could have been used instead of the one-time-use ἐπιούσιον.

Another potential issue with a "for the future" translation is it seems to contradict Matthew 6:31, where only a few verses later Jesus tells his followers not to worry about food, that God will take care of such needs. W. D. Davies, a Welsh Congregationalist scholar, and Dale Allison, an American New Testament scholar, however, do not see a contradiction: Matthew 6:34 tells one not to be anxious about such needs: that a pious person asks God in prayer for these needs to be filled, may rather be why there is no need to worry.

=== "Doesn't run out" ===
Kenneth E. Bailey, a professor of theology and linguistics, proposed "give us today the bread that doesn't run out" as the correct translation.

The Syriac versions of the Bible were some of the first translations of the Gospels from the Greek into another language. Syriac is also close to Jesus' own Aramaic, and the translators close in time and language to Jesus should thus have had considerable insight into his original meanings. In Syriac epiousion is translated as ameno, meaning lasting, perpetual, constant, trustworthy, never-ceasing, never-ending, or always.

=== "Estate" ===
Lutheran scholar Douglas E. Oakman suggests "give us today bread in abundance" as another translation. He notes that in the contemporary literature ousia can mean substance, but it also has a concrete meaning of a large, substantial, estate. Thus as a cognate of the word periousios, epiousion could refer to plentiful or abundant bread.

Oakman also notes contemporary sources that translate ousia as the royal or imperial estate and proposes that the verse could originally have meant "give us the royal bread ration for today."

=== "That belongs to it" ===
Davies and Allison state that the verse has also been translated as "give us this day the bread that belongs to it", though they concede that this expression is little recognized by modern scholars.

== Equivalent terms used by language family ==
Language		Term	Meaning	Source
Germanic	Dutch	dagelijks	daily	
Germanic	Dutch	dat wij nodig hebben	that we need	
Germanic	German	tägliches	daily	
Germanic	Gothic	𐍃𐌹𐌽𐍄𐌴𐌹𐌽𐌰𐌽 (sinteinan)	daily	Wulfila Bible
Germanic	Norwegian	daglige (Bokmål)	daily	
Germanic	Norwegian	daglege (Nynorsk)	daily	
Germanic	Swedish	dagliga	daily	
Germanic	Swedish	för dagen som kommer	for the day to-come	
Germanic	Swedish	vi behöver	(that) we need	
Malayo-Polynesian	Indonesian	secukupnya	enough	
Romance	French	de ce jour	this day's	
Romance	French	essentiel	essential	
Romance	French	nécessaire	needed	
Romance	French	dont nous avons besoin	that we need	
Romance	French	qu'il nous faut	that we lack	
Romance	French	de la journée	of the day	
Romance	French	pour jour	for the day	
Romance	French	de demain	tomorrow's	
Romance	French	spirituel	spiritual	
Romance	Latin	cottidianum/cotidianum	everyday	Vetus Latina, Matthew 6:11, Luke 11:3, Vulgate, Luke 11:3 (Stuttgart Vulgate)
Romance	Latin	supersubstantialem	supersubstantial	Vulgate, Matthew 6:11 (Stuttgart Vulgate)
Romance	Spanish	de cada día	each day's	
Romance	Spanish	sustancial de cada día	each day's substantial	
Romance	Romanian	de toate zilele	each day's	
Romance	Romanian	spre ființă	supersubstantial	
Semitic	Syriac	ܝܘܡܢܐ (yawmānā)	today's	Peshitta
Semitic	Syriac	ܐܡܝܢܐ (ameno, ʾammīnā)	everlasting	Curetonian Gospels, liturgical
Slavonic	Czech	vezdejší	daily	Bible of Kralice
Slavonic	Polish	powszedni	daily, everyday	Millennium Bible
Slavonic	Russian	насу́щный	vital, urgent	Russian Synodal Bible
Slavonic	Ukrainian	насу́щний	vital, urgent	Ohienko Bible
Baltic	Latvian	dienišķo	daily	
Vasconic	Basque	egun honetako	this day's	Elizen Arteko Biblia
Vasconic	Basque	eguneco / eguneko	the day's	Joanes Leizarraga / Elizen Arteko Biblia

=== Slavonic translations ===
The Old Church Slavonic canon translates epiousion variously as well. For example, Codex Marianus translates it as насѫщьнъі (nasǫštĭnŭì, which appears to be a calque of epiousion using the ousia etymology with debatable semantics) in Luke 11:3 but наставъшааго дьне (nastavŭšaago dĭne, 'for the coming day') in Matthew 6:11. Sava's book agrees in the latter case, but has дьневьнъі (dĭnevĭnŭì, 'daily') in the former, while Codex Zographensis has надьневьнъі (nadĭnevĭnŭì) and настоѩшт… (nastojęšt) respectively.

The New Church Slavonic version has the calque насꙋщный (nasūštnȳĭ) in both cases now, following 16th-century Ostrog Bible, and the dictionaries translate the New Church Slavonic word as 'necessary for existence' (note that the sense of the word likely changed in course of the time), from which derives Russian насущный.

== See also ==
- Language of the New Testament
- Filioque
