= Basser =

Basser is a surname. Notable people with the surname include:

- Herbert Basser (born 1942), Canadian scholar of religion and Jewish theologian
- Michaël Chrétien Basser (born 1984), French-Moroccan footballer
- Russell Basser (born 1960), Australian Olympic water polo player

== See also ==
- Basser College, residential college at the University of New South Wales in Sydney, Australia
- Basser Library, the library of the Australian Academy of Science
- Stade Francis Le Basser, multi-use stadium in Laval, France
