= André Paul =

French scholar, educator and writer

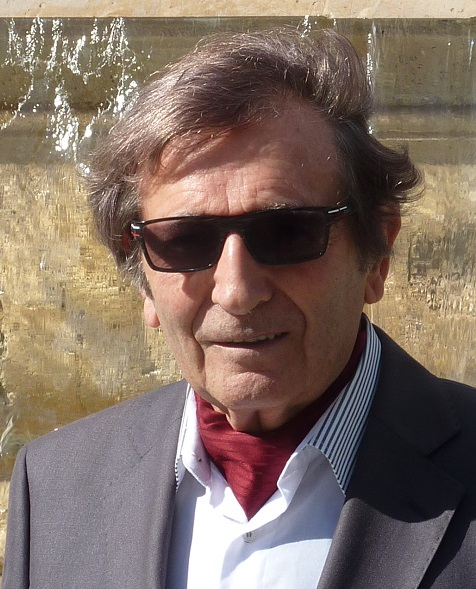

André Paul (born Loures-Barousse, 7 April 1933) is a noted French scholar, educator and writer in the fields of theology, biblical studies and ancient Judaism. Paul's early research explored the relationship between the Dead Sea Scrolls and Karaite Judaism.

In 2011 Paul was made an Officer of the Ordre des Arts et des Lettres by the French government, in recognition of his contribution to French culture.

== Life ==
=== Early life ===
Paul was born in 1933 on a tiny farm in the Pyrenees, one of four children. At the age of 11, through a government scholarship, he enrolled in the College of Notre-Dame de Comminges, in Montréjeau. His father, Thomas Paul, died shortly after this. (Note: In 1974 André Paul dedicated his book, L'impertinence biblique, to his father, writing: To my late father, Thomas Paul, whose life was cruelly beautiful and productively short, he knew how to teach us to live without doubt.) As a young man of 18, Paul entered the seminary in Toulouse to become a Catholic priest, where he began the study of Hebrew, which he has said determined his future. He then fulfilled his military duty for the next three years, serving in Algeria and Morocco.

Returning to France and his studies, Paul enrolled at University Seminary of Pope Pius XI in Toulouse, where he earned a licentiate in theology. He then went to Paris, where he joined the Society of Saint-Sulpice, dedicated to the training of the Catholic clergy, and continued his studies. He has since left both the priesthood and the Society and married Isabelle Le Corre.

=== Academic career ===
In Paris, Paul came to know the biblical scholar, Jean Carmignac, who introduced him to Karaite Judaism, which developed in the 9th century. It became the topic of his doctoral thesis. During this time, he furthered his knowledge of Aramaic and learned Syriac and Coptic, earning a diploma in Semitic languages. He was given the job of editing the article Karaites in the supplement to the Dictionnaire de la Bible published in 1962.

In October 1963 Paul moved to Rome, where he began studies at the Pontifical Biblical Institute. During this time, he was able to observe firsthand the proceedings of the Second Vatican Council. He returned to Paris after two years and submitted his first thesis on the origins of Karaism in May 1966. This resulted in the publication of his first book, in 1968, L’évangile de l’enfance selon Saint Matthieu (The Infancy Narrative in the Gospel of St. Matthew). During this time he was the professor of exegesis at the Regional Seminary of the Midi-Pyrénées.

Paul's research on the origins of Karaism were published in 1969, the same year in which he began to teach at the Institut Catholique de Paris. In September of that year, he gave an address at the Congress of the French Catholic Association for Biblical Studies held at Chantilly, Oise, where Paul Ricoeur and Roland Barthes acted as responders. In 1970, he was appointed as the editor of the influential journal, Recherches de science religieuse, succeeding the noted Jesuit scholar and cardinal, Jean Daniélou.

Paul began to explore the significance of Structuralism for his work. He was greatly by two books: The Archaeology of Knowledge by Michel Foucault and The Logic of Life: A History of Heredity by François Jacob. Working with this new perspective, he went on to earn the degree of Doctor of Arts in 1974. That same year, he was the Literary Director for Éditions Desclée, a noted Catholic publishing firm. At the same time, he released his work L’impertinence biblique (The Impertinence of the Bible). This book so disturbed the French Catholic hierarchy that he was forced to leave the Institut Catholique in 1977.

In collaboration with the French historian, Charles Pietri, Paul launched his monumental History of Christianity in 1981. The process took 20 years to complete, and produced 14 volumes. The work has since been translated into German and Italian. Meanwhile, together with Bernard Sesboüé, he launched a 4-volume History of Dogmas in 1989.

In 2004 Paul was entrusted with the direction of a new series of books on Qumran called La Bibliothèque de Qumrân, published by Éditions du Cerf, which was to be written by a team of young scholars in the field. The first book in the series was published in 2008. In turn, this sparked a successful exhibit on the Dead Sea Scrolls held at the Bibliothèque Nationale in Paris in the spring of 2010.

== Works ==
- L'évangile de l'enfance selon saint Matthieu - Éditions du Cerf - 1968.
- Écrits de Qumrân et sectes juives aux premiers siècles de l'Islam - Recherches sur l'origine du Qaraïsme - publié avec le concours du CNRS - Letouzey et Ané - 1969.
- Parcours évangéliques. Perspectives nouvelles - Éditions du Cerf - 1973.
- L'impertinence biblique - Éditions Desclée - 1974.
- Intertestament - Cahiers Évangile 14 - Éditions du Cerf - 1975.
- Le fait biblique - Éditions du Cerf - 1979
- Le monde des Juifs à l'heure de Jésus. Histoire politique - Desclée - 1981.
- L'inspiration et le canon des Écritures - Cahier Évangile n° 49 - Éd. du Cerf - 1984.
- Le judaïsme ancien et la Bible - Desclée - 1987.
- Leçons paradoxales sur les Juifs et les chrétiens - Éditions Desclée de Brouwer - 1992.
- La Bible coll. Repères pratiques 35 - Nathan - 1995.
- Les manuscrits de la mer Morte - Bayard - 1997.
- Et l'homme créa la Bible. D'Hérodote à Flavius Josèphe - Bayard - 2000.
- Jésus Christ, la rupture. Essai sur la naissance du christianisme - Bayard - 2001.
- A l'écoute de la Torah. Introduction au judaïsme - Éditions du Cerf - 2004.
- La Bible avant la Bible. La grande révélation des manuscrits de la mer Morte - Éditions du Cerf - 2005.
- La Bible et l'Occident. De la bibliothèque d'Alexandrie à la culture européenne - Bayard - 2007.
- Qumrân et les Esséniens. L'éclatement d'un dogme - Éditions du Cerf - 2008.
- La Bibliothèque de Qumrân, Vol. I (concepteur et co-directeur), Éditions du Cerf, 2008.
- De l'Ancien Testament au Nouveau - 1. Autour du Pentateuque - Cahier Évangile n° 152 - juin 2010.
- De l'Ancien Testament au Nouveau - 2. Autour des Prophètes et autres Écrits - Cahier Évangile n° 153 - septembre 2010.
- Autrement la Bible - Mythe, politique et société - Bayard - 2013.
