= Matthew 6:11 =

- ← 6:10 6:12 →
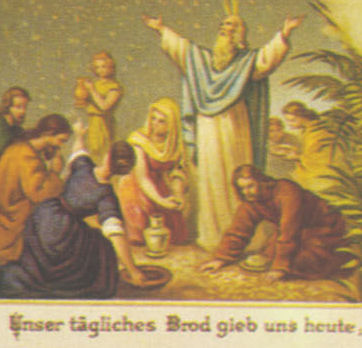
- A 19th century depiction of this verse
- Book: Gospel of Matthew
- Christian Bible part: New Testament

Matthew 6:11 is the eleventh verse of the sixth chapter of the Gospel of Matthew in the New Testament and forms part of the Sermon on the Mount. This verse is the third one of the Lord's Prayer, one of the best known parts of the entire New Testament. This brief verse contains the fourth petition to God.

== Text ==
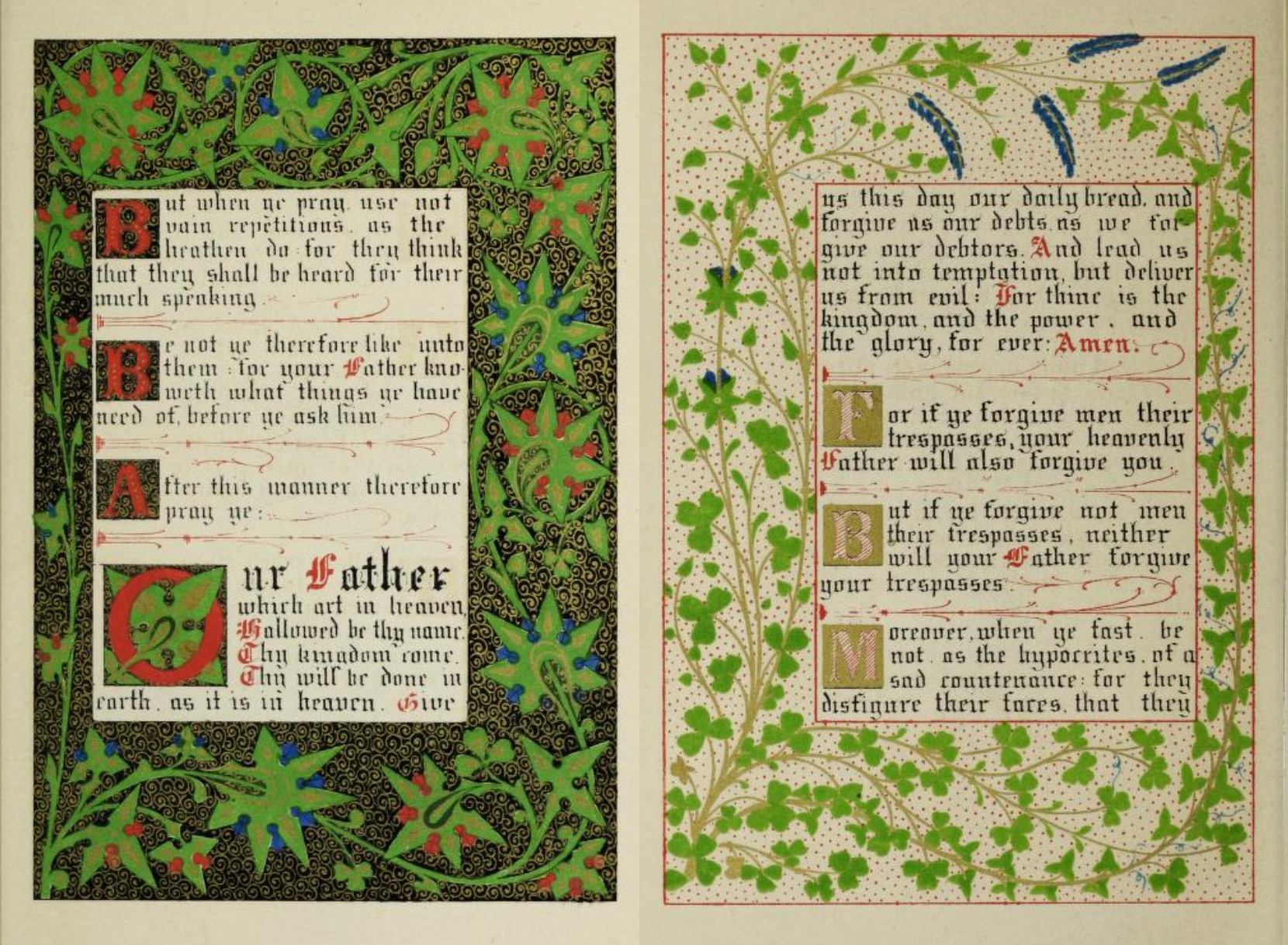
Matthew 6:7–16 from the 1845 illuminated book of The Sermon on the Mount, designed by Owen Jones.

The original Koine Greek, according to Westcott and Hort, reads:

Τὸν ἄρτον ἡμῶν τὸν ἐπιούσιον δὸς ἡμῖν σήμερον
(Interlinear: "The -- bread -- of-us -- - -- epiousion -- give -- us -- today")

"Give us today our epiousios bread"
Matthew 6:11

Via linguistic parsing, Epiousios is translated as supersubstantialem in the Vulgate (Matthew 6:11) and accordingly as supersubstantial in the Douay–Rheims Bible (Matthew 6:11):

"Give us this day our supersubstantial bread."

Reflecting interpretations from the Vetus Latina, the King James Version of the Bible the text reads:

"Give us this day our daily bread."

The English Standard Version translates the passage as:

"Give us this day our daily bread."

For a collection of other versions see BibleHub Matthew 6:11.

This petition marks a change in the character of the prayer. The first three petitions called for the glory of God in the second person. This petition, and the two that follow, call for personal needs to be met in the second person plural. Unlike the earlier parts of the prayer, there is no clear parallel to this one in Jewish prayers of that era.

== Interpretations ==
There are multiple ways of interpreting this verse, primarily because of the uncertain translation of the word epiousios. The original word ἐπιούσιος (epiousios), commonly characterized as daily, is unique to the Lord's Prayer in all of ancient Greek literature. The word is almost a hapax legomenon, occurring only in Luke and Matthew's versions of the Lord's Prayer, and nowhere else in any other extant Greek texts. Several other terms in the New Testament are also translated as daily, but they all reference hemeran (ἡμέραν, "the day"), which does not appear in this usage.

=== Food ===
In the New Testament era, bread was the most important food, especially for the poor and dispossessed segments of society who Jesus frequently refers to in the Sermon on the Mount. Bread was so large a part of the diet, that translating the term as simply food may be closer to its contemporary understanding. Boring believes that while there may be other metaphorical meanings, this basic meaning of bread as sustenance would always have been read into the verse.

Early adopters of the "daily" interpretation include the Vetus Latina manuscripts, John Chrysostom, Gregory of Nyssa, and Theodore of Mopsuestia. The translation of quotidianum was also used by Jerome, not while translating Matthew but when translating the same word in the Sermon in Luke. Quotidianum became the standard term in the Catholic liturgy, as the Lord's Prayer used an earlier translation than the Vulgate.

One problem with this interpretation is that in Matthew 6:31 only a few verses later, Jesus tells his followers to not worry about things such as food. Raymond E. Brown rejects the literal interpretation as the rest of the prayer is clearly metaphorical and eschatological, and a literal request for bread is out of place.

A more difficult matter for the "daily" interpretation is that while epiousios is often substituted by the word "daily," all other New Testament translations from the Greek into "daily" otherwise reference hemeran (ἡμέραν, "the day"), which does not appear in this usage.

Barclay M. Newman's A Concise Greek-English Dictionary of the New Testament, published in a revised edition in 2010 by the United Bible Societies has the following entry:

ἐπι|ούσιος, ον (εἰμί) of doubtful meaning, for today; for the coming day; necessary for existence It thus derives the word from the preposition ἐπί (epi) and the verb εἰμί (eimi), from the latter of which are derived words such as οὐσία (ousia), the range of whose meanings is indicated in A Greek-English Lexicon.

Daily remains the most common translation. William Hendriksen observes that, without any real proof for alternate readings, there is no need to abandon the traditional translation that readers are familiar with. "Daily", he says, is also quite close to both the "necessary for survival" and "for the coming day" meanings, which are the most popular among scholars.

=== Eucharistic ===
The problem of epiousios was noted as early as Origen, who felt term was a neologism created by the gospel writers. He interpreted the word as meaning "necessary for existence." Following this linguistic parsing, Jerome translated "ἐπιούσιον" (epiousios) as supersubstantialem in the Gospel of Matthew. This itself is a new word, not before seen in Latin.

This translation has often been connected to the eucharist. The bread necessary for existence is the communion bread of the Last Supper. That the gospel writers needed to create a new word indicates to Eugene LaVerdiere that they are describing something new. Eating the communion bread at the last supper needed a new word.

This wide-ranging difference with respect to meaning of epiousios is discussed in detail in the current Catechism of the Catholic Church by way of an inclusive approach toward tradition as well as a literal one for meaning:

"Taken in a temporal sense, this word is a pedagogical repetition of "this day," to confirm us in trust "without reservation." Taken in the qualitative sense, it signifies what is necessary for life, and more broadly every good thing sufficient for subsistence. Taken literally (epi-ousios: "super-essential"), it refers directly to the Bread of Life, the Body of Christ, the "medicine of immortality," without which we have no life within us."

This interpretation was also central to the Bogomil sect. In Bulgarian Bibles to this day, epiousios is translated as daily substantial.

Barclay M. Newman's A Concise Greek-English Dictionary of the New Testament, published in a revised edition in 2010 by the United Bible Societies has the following entry:

ἐπι|ούσιος, ον (εἰμί) of doubtful meaning, for today; for the coming day; necessary for existence It thus derives the word from the preposition ἐπί (epi) and the verb εἰμί (eimi), from the latter of which are derived words such as οὐσία (ousia), the range of whose meanings is indicated in A Greek-English Lexicon.

This interpretation was supported by early writers such as Augustine, Cyril of Jerusalem, Cyprian of Carthage, John Cassian and it is still a part of Catholic doctrine. The connection to the eucharist is rejected by most current scholars. Brant Pitre notes that "it receives virtually no support among modern exegetes." Boring notes that the connection with the eucharist is ahistoric as the ritual only developed some time after the Gospel was written and the author of Matthew does not seem to have any knowledge of or interest in the rituals of the eucharist. Craig Blomberg agrees that these "concepts had yet to be introduced when Jesus gave his original prayer and therefore could not have been part of his original meaning." David G. Buttrick summarizes the consensus that "for centuries the church interpreted epiousios sacramentally: Bread was Eucharist. But the word does not refer to eucharistic bread."

=== Eschatological ===
This verse can also be read in an eschatological context. Epiousios can be translated as "bread for tomorrow" or "bread for the future." This translation is also advanced as a possibility by Jerome. Other early supporters of this translation are Cyril of Alexandria and Peter of Laodicea. Albert Schweitzer reintroduced this translation in modern times.

In the New Testament bread is common "symbol of eschatological blessedness" and the metaphor of the Kingdom of Heaven as a divine banquet was a common one at the time and found at Luke 14:15. The obscurity of the word epiousios could be because it specifically refers to bread of the end times, or perhaps to the manna of the Exodus 16:4, which comes in amounts sufficient for each day. The link to the manna provided by God to the Israelites during Exodus could represents the reward the faithful can expect from God at the end of times. Thus the prayer could be calling for a new eschatological exodus.

Crump rejects this metaphorical interpretation. He notes that tomorrow is not an eschatological term in Matthew, and while bread is used metaphorically elsewhere in Matthew, the context is always clear. Schweizer similarly doubts the non-literal interpretations. Throughout the gospel Jesus has been portrayed as caring for the daily needs of his followers, and his miraculously providing them with bread is a symbol of this. Schweizer feels bread was a very real need, not a metaphoric one. R.T. France similarly argues that nothing in the verse implies bread should not be seen literally.

== Commentary from the Church Fathers ==
Augustine: These three things therefore which have been asked in the foregoing petitions, are begun here on earth, and according to our proficiency are increased in us; but in another life, as we hope, they shall be everlastingly possessed in perfection. In the four remaining petitions we ask for temporal blessings which are necessary to obtaining the eternal; the bread, which is accordingly the next petition in order, is a necessary.

Jerome: The Greek word here which we render ‘supersubstantialis,’ is ἐπιούσιος. The LXX (Septuagint) often make use of the word περιούσιος, by which we find, on reference to the Hebrew, they always render the word sogolac. Symmachus translates it ἐξαίρετος, that is, ‘chief,’ or ‘excellent,’ though in one place he has interpreted ‘peculiar.’ When then we pray God to give us our ‘peculiar’ or ‘chief’ bread, we mean Him who says in the Gospel, I am the living bread which came down from heaven. (John 6:51.)

Cyprian: For Christ is the bread of life, and this bread belongs not to all men, but to us. This bread we pray that it be given day by day, lest we who are in Christ, and who daily receive the Eucharist for food of salvation, should by the admission of any grievous crime, and our being therefore forbidden the heavenly bread, be separated from the body of Christ. Hence then we pray, that we who abide in Christ, may not draw back from His sanctification and His body.

Augustine: Here then the saints ask for perseverance of God, when they pray that they may not be separated from the body of Christ, but may abide in that holiness, committing no crime.

Pseudo-Chrysostom:d. Or by ‘supersubstantialis’ may be intended ‘daily.’

John Cassian: In that He says, this day, He shows that it is to be daily taken, and that this prayer should be offered at all seasons, seeing there is no day on which we have not need, by the receiving of this bread, to confirm the heart of e inward man.

John Cassian: Though the expression to-day may be understood of this present life; thus, Give us this bread while we abide in this world.

Jerome: We may also interpret the word ‘supersubstantialis’ otherwise, as that which is above all other substances, and more excellent than all creatures, to wit, the body of the Lord.

Augustine: Or by daily we may understand spiritual, namely, the divine precepts which we ought to meditate and work.

Gregory the Great: We call it our bread, yet pray that it may be given us, for it is God's to give, and is made ours by our receiving it.

Jerome: Others understand it literally according to that saying of the Apostle, Having food and raiment, let us therewith be content, that the saints should have care only of present food; as it follows, Take no thought for the morrow.

Augustine: So that herein we ask for a sufficiency of all things necessary under the one name of bread.

Augustine: Some one may perhaps find a difficulty in our here praying that we may obtain necessaries of this life, such as food and raiment, when the Lord has instructed us, Be not ye careful what ye shall eat, or wherewithal ye shall be clothed. But it is impossible not to be careful about that for the obtaining which we pray.

Augustine: But to wish for the necessaries of life and no more, is not improper; for such sufficiency is not sought for its own sake, but for the health of the body, and for such garb and appliances of the person, as may make us to be not disagreeable to those with whom we have to live in all good reputation. For these things we may pray that they may be had when we are in want of them, that they may be kept when we have them.

Chrysostom: It should be thought upon how when He had delivered to us this petition, Thy will be done as in heaven so in earth, then because He spake to men in the flesh, and not like angelic natures without passion or appetite, He now descends to the needs of our bodies. And He teaches us to pray not for money or the gratification of lust, but for daily bread; and as yet further restriction, He adds, this day, that we should not trouble ourselves with thought for the coming day.

Pseudo-Chrysostom: And these words at first sight might seem to forbid our having it prepared for the morrow, or after the morrow. If this were so, this prayer could only suit a few; such as the Apostles who travelled hither and thither teaching—or perhaps none among us. Yet ought we so to adapt Christ's doctrine, that all men may profit in it.

Cyprian: Justly therefore does the disciple of Christ make petition for to-day's provision, without indulging excessive longings in his prayer. It were a self-contradicting and incompatible thing for us who pray that the kingdom of God may quickly come, to be looking unto long life in the world below.

Pseudo-Chrysostom: Or; He adds, daily, that a man may eat so much only as natural reason requires, not as the lust of the flesh urges. For if you expend on one banquet as much as would suffice you for a hundred days, you are not eating to-day's provision, but that of many days.

Jerome: In the Gospel, entitled The Gospel according to the Hebrews, ‘supersubstantialis’ is rendered ‘mohar,’ that is ‘to-morrow’s;’ so that the sense would be, Give us today to-morrow's bread; i. e. for the time to come.

Preceded by Matthew 6:10	Gospel of Matthew; Chapter 6	Succeeded by Matthew 6:12
