= Uncial 0153 =

- New Testament manuscript
- Text: 2 Corinthians 4:7; 2 Timothy 2:20
- Script: Greek
- Now at: Bodleian Library
- Cite: J. G. Tait, Greek Ostraka in the Bodleian Library and Various other Collections (London: 1930).
- Type: none
- Category: none
- Note: concurs with NA27

Uncial 0153 (in the Gregory-Aland numbering), is a Greek ostracon uncial manuscript of the New Testament. It is unglazed pottery. It contains texts 2 Corinthians 4:7 and 2 Timothy 2:20.

== Description ==
Caspar René Gregory included it into uncials, but Ernst von Dobschütz included it into Ostraca. Dobschütz enumerated 25 ostraca of the New Testament. This opinion was supported by other scholars, and in result Uncial 0153 was deleted from the list of the New Testament uncials, and remained empty place in the list.

== Text ==
Earthen vessels (σκευη, οστρακινα) were in universal use in the antiquity. They are twice mentioned in the New Testament: 2 Corinthians 4:7 and in 2 Timothy 2:20.

2 Corinthians 4:7

Εχομεν δε τον θησαυρον τουτον εν οστρακινοις σκευεσιν ινα η υπερβολη της δυναμεως η του θεου και μη εξ ημων.

2 Timothy 2:20

Εν μεγαλη δε οικια ουκ εστιν μονον σκευη χρυσα και αργυρα αλλα και ξυλινα και οστρακινα και α μεν εις τιμην α δε εις ατιμιαν.

The Greek text of the codex is too brief to determine its textual character.

== Present location ==
It is currently located at the Bodleian Library (Ms. 62), at Oxford.

== See also ==
- List of New Testament uncials
- Textual criticism
- Uncial 0152
