= Uncial 0152 =

Uncial 0152 (in the Gregory-Aland numbering), is a Greek talisman manuscript of the New Testament. It contains a small fragment of the Gospel of Matthew (16:9-13). It is dated to the 4th century.

== Description ==
The text is written in 8 lines and 18 letters per line.

Caspar René Gregory classified manuscripts of New Testament into four groups: Papyri, Uncials, Minuscules, and Lectionaries. Talisman included into Uncials, it received number 0152. Eberhard Nestle distinguished new group – Talismans, and to this group included Uncial 0152. It received no. 1. This opinion was supported by other scholars, f.e. Kurt Aland, and in result Uncial 0152 (or Talisman 1) was deleted from the list of New Testament uncials, and now we have empty place in position 152 of the list.

== See also ==
- List of New Testament uncials
- Textual criticism
- Uncial 0153
