= Matthew 6:9 =

- ← 6:8 6:10 →
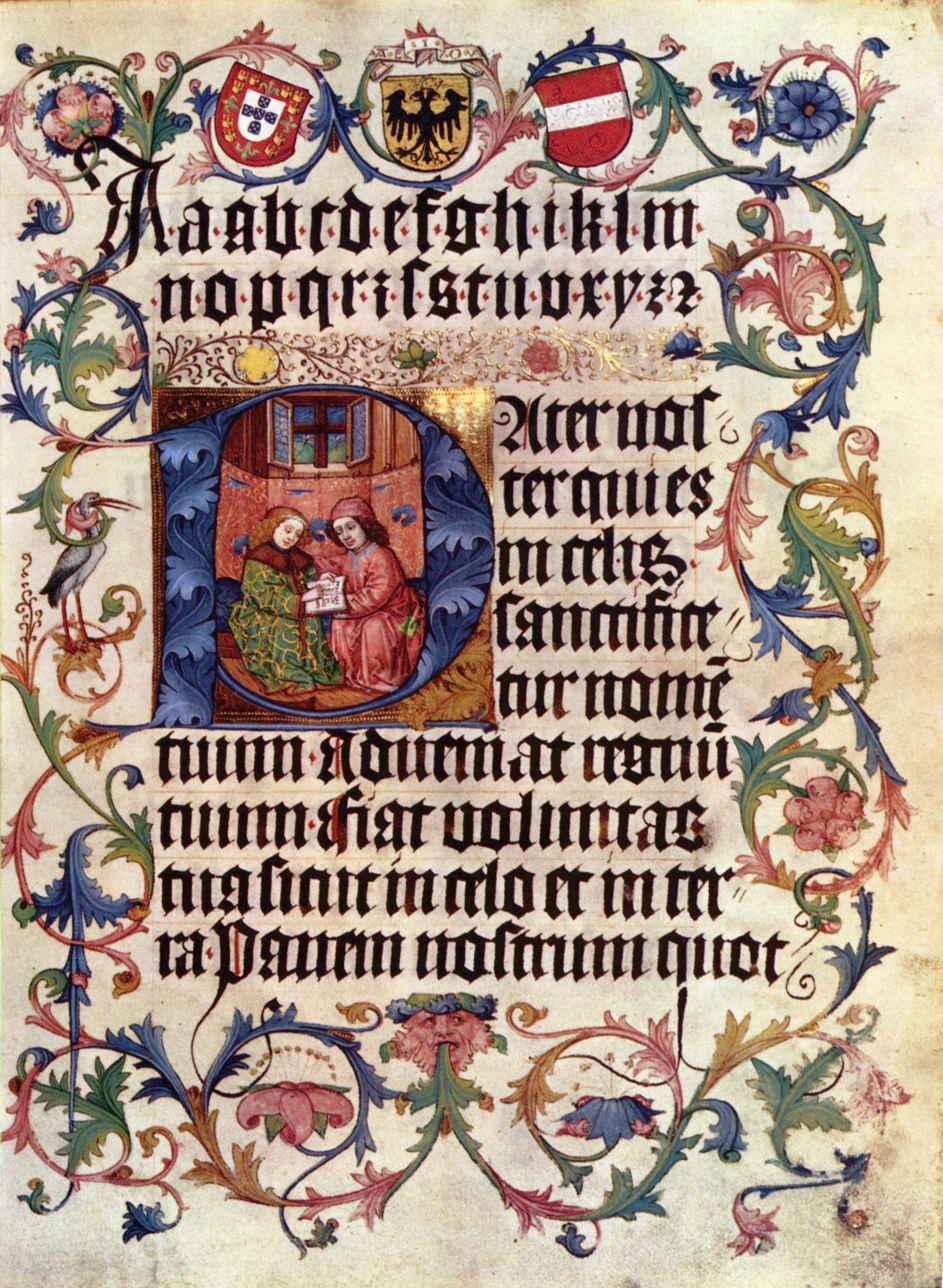
- The opening of the Lord's Prayer (Matthew 6:9) in Latin, 1500, Vienna.
- Book: Gospel of Matthew
- Christian Bible part: New Testament

Matthew 6:9 is the ninth verse of the sixth chapter of the Gospel of Matthew in the New Testament and is part of the Sermon on the Mount. This verse is the opening of the Lord's Prayer, one of the best known parts of the entire New Testament.

== Content ==
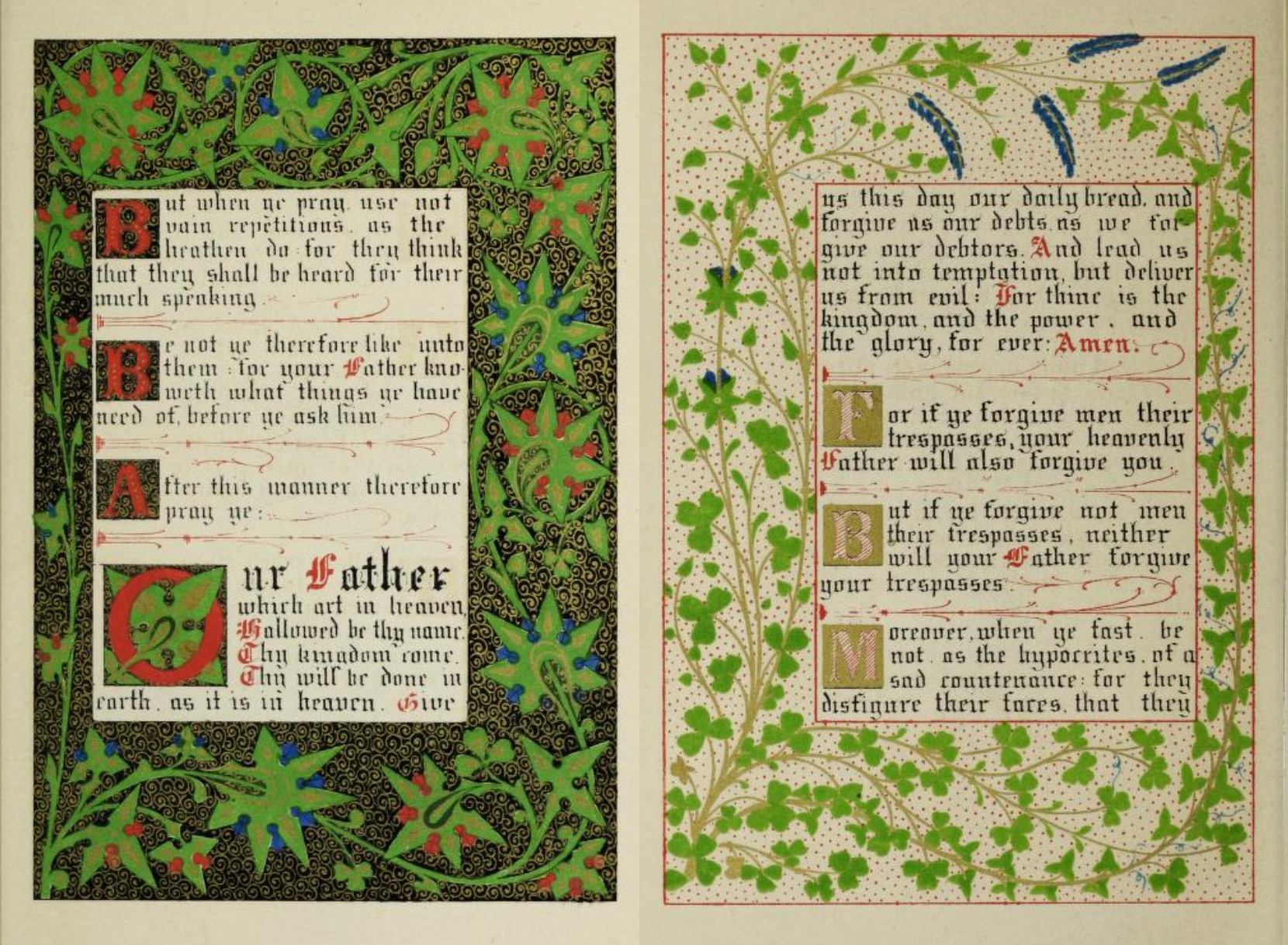
Matthew 6:7–16 from the 1845 illuminated book of The Sermon on the Mount, designed by Owen Jones.

In the King James Version of the Bible the text reads:

After this manner therefore pray ye: Our Father
who art in heaven, Hallowed be thy name.

The World English Bible translates this verse as:

Pray like this: ‘Our Father in heaven,
may your name be kept holy.

The English Standard Version translates this verse as:

Pray then like this:
"Our Father in heaven,
hallowed be your name.

The Novum Testamentum Graece text is:

οὕτως οὖν προσεύχεσθε
ὑμεῖς Πάτερ ἡμῶν ὁ ἐν τοῖς οὐρανοῖς
Ἁγιασθήτω τὸ ὄνομά σου·

== Analysis ==
The verse opens with an instruction to pray in the manner that follows. This opening makes clear that this is not a prayer to be given by Jesus himself, rather it is one to be spoken by his followers. This is important to Christian theology, as the prayer mentions forgiveness for sins, and Jesus is held to be sinless. How specific Jesus' instruction is is a matter of some debate. The prayer that follows has been repeated word for word billions of times, but some scholars believe that Jesus was here giving a general guideline for what prayers should contain rather than a specific prayer. That the New Testament gives other prayers, including a similar one in Luke, is one indication that different wordings are acceptable. The New Testament also reports Jesus disciples praying on several occasions, but never describes them using this prayer.

The opening pronoun is plural, which France notes indicates that the prayer was likely intended for communal worship, rather than private repetition. The New Testament also makes clear that father is a title used by disciples to refer to God. Only those already redeemed should use it, and this prayer is thus for those already converted.

Matthew's wording here reflects that of Jewish works of this period. Luke's very similar prayer at Luke 11:2-4 far more radically has simply Father, rather than our Father, a usage unheard of in Jewish literature of the period. Matthew's our Father makes the relationship somewhat more distant, and more acceptable to Jewish sensibilities. The word translated as father is abba. This is a somewhat informal term that would have been used by young children to address their father. However, it was a term that adult children would sometimes use, and a general term of reverence for any elder male in a community. Boring writes that papa would be a more literal translation, and be closer to the sense of the original.

"Hallowed be thy name" is similar to a portion of the synagogue prayer known as the Qaddish. The Greek word for hallowed was a rare one, and like the English term almost only found in a Biblical context. It means to honour or revere, but also to worship and glorify. In Judaism the name of God is of extreme importance, and honouring the name central to piety. Hendriksen notes that in this era names were not simply labels, but were seen as true reflections of the nature of the object. Thus revering God's name is the equivalent of revering God. One view is that this petition is thus calling for obedience to God and to His commands. Green argues that the hallowing of God's name is deliberately the first among the three petitions in the prayer, in order to reassert the primacy of God over all other things.

Hallowed is in the passive voice and future tense, which makes it unclear how this hallowing is meant to occur. One interpretation is that this is a call for all believers to honour God's name. For those who see the prayer as primarily eschatological the prayer is instead a call for the end times when God's power will ensure his name is universally honoured, and that this petition is not necessarily advice for the present.

== Commentary from the Church Fathers ==
Glossa Ordinaria: Amongst His other saving instructions and divine lessons, wherewith He counsels believers, He has set forth for us a form of prayer in few words; thus giving us confidence that that will be quickly granted, for which He would have us pray so shortly.

Cyprian: He who gave to us to live, taught us also to pray, to the end, that speaking to the Father in the prayer which the Son hath taught, we may receive a readier hearing. It is praying like friends and familiars to offer up to God of His own. Let the Father recognize the Son's words when we offer up our prayer; and seeing we have Him when we sin for an Advocate with the Father, let us put forward the words of our Advocate, when as sinners we make petition for our offences.

Glossa Ordinaria: Yet we do not confine ourselves wholly to these words, but use others also conceived in the same sense, with which our heart is kindled.

Chrysostom: For what hurt does such kindred with those beneath us, when we are all alike kin to One above us? For who calls God Father, in that one title confesses at once the forgiveness of sins, the adoption, the heirship, the brotherhood, which he has with the Only-begotten, and the gift of the Spirit. For none can call God Father, but he who has obtained all these blessings. In a two-fold manner, therefore, he moves the feeling of them that pray, both by the dignity of Him who is prayed to, and the greatness of those benefits which we gain by prayer.

Cyprian: We say not My Father, but Our Father, for the teacher of peace and master of unity would not have men pray singly and severally, since when any prays, he is not to pray for himself only. Our prayer is general and for all, and when we pray, we pray not for one person but for us all, because we all are one. So also He willed that one should pray for all, according as himself in one did bear us all.

Pseudo-Chrysostom: To pray for ourselves it is our necessity compels us, to pray for others brotherly charity instigates.

Glossa Ordinaria: Also because He is a common Father of all, we say, Our Father; not My Father which is appropriate to Christ alone, who is His Son by nature.

Pseudo-Chrysostom: Which art in heaven, is added, that we may know that we have a heavenly Father, and may blush to immerse ourselves wholly in earthly things when we have a Father in heaven.

John Cassian: And that we should speed with strong desire thitherward where our Father dwells.

Chrysostom: In heaven, not confining God's presence to that, but withdrawing the thoughts of the petitioner from earth and fixing them on things above.

Augustine: Having named Him to whom prayer is made and where He dwells, let us now see what things they are for which we ought to pray. But the first of all the things that are prayed for is, Hallowed be thy name, not implying that the name of God is not holy, but that it may be held sacred of men; that is, that God may be so known that nothing may be esteemed more holy.

Chrysostom: Or; He bids us in praying beg that God may be glorified in our life; as if we were to say, Make us to live so that all things may glorify Thee through us. For hallowed signifies the same as glorified. It is a petition worthy to be made by man to God, to ask nothing before the glory of the Father, but to postpone all things to His praise.

Cyprian: Otherwise, we say this not as wishing for God to be made holy by our prayers, but asking of Him for His name to be kept holy in us. For seeing He Himself has said, Be ye holy, for I also am holy, (Lev. 20:7.) it is this that we ask and request that we who have been sanctified in Baptism, may persevere such as we have begun.

Augustine: But why is this perseverance asked of God, if, as the Pelagians say, it is not given by God? Is it not a mocking petition to ask of God what we know is not given by Him, but is in the power of man himself to attain?

Cyprian: For this we daily make petition, since we need a daily sanctification, in order that we who sin day by day, may cleanse afresh our offences by a continual sanctification.

Preceded by Matthew 6:8	Gospel of Matthew; Chapter 6	Succeeded by Matthew 6:10
