= Matthew 6:10 =

- ← 6:9 6:11 →
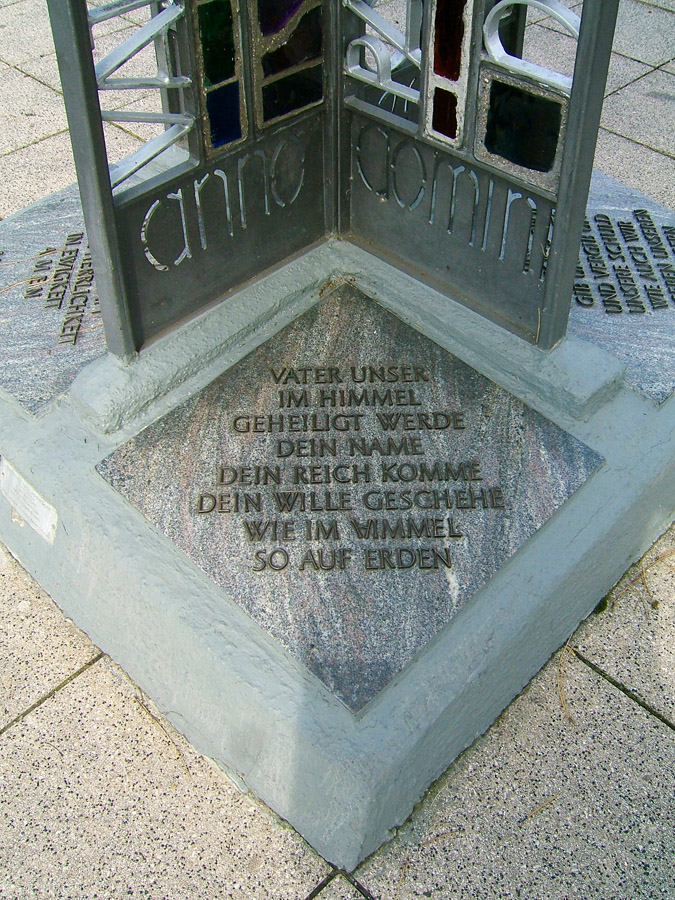
- Matthew 6:9–10 on a sculpture in Germany
- Book: Gospel of Matthew
- Christian Bible part: New Testament

Matthew 6:10 is the tenth verse of the sixth chapter of the Gospel of Matthew in the New Testament and is part of the Sermon on the Mount. This verse is the second one of the Lord's Prayer, one of the best known parts of the entire New Testament. This verse contains the second and third petitions to God.

== Content ==
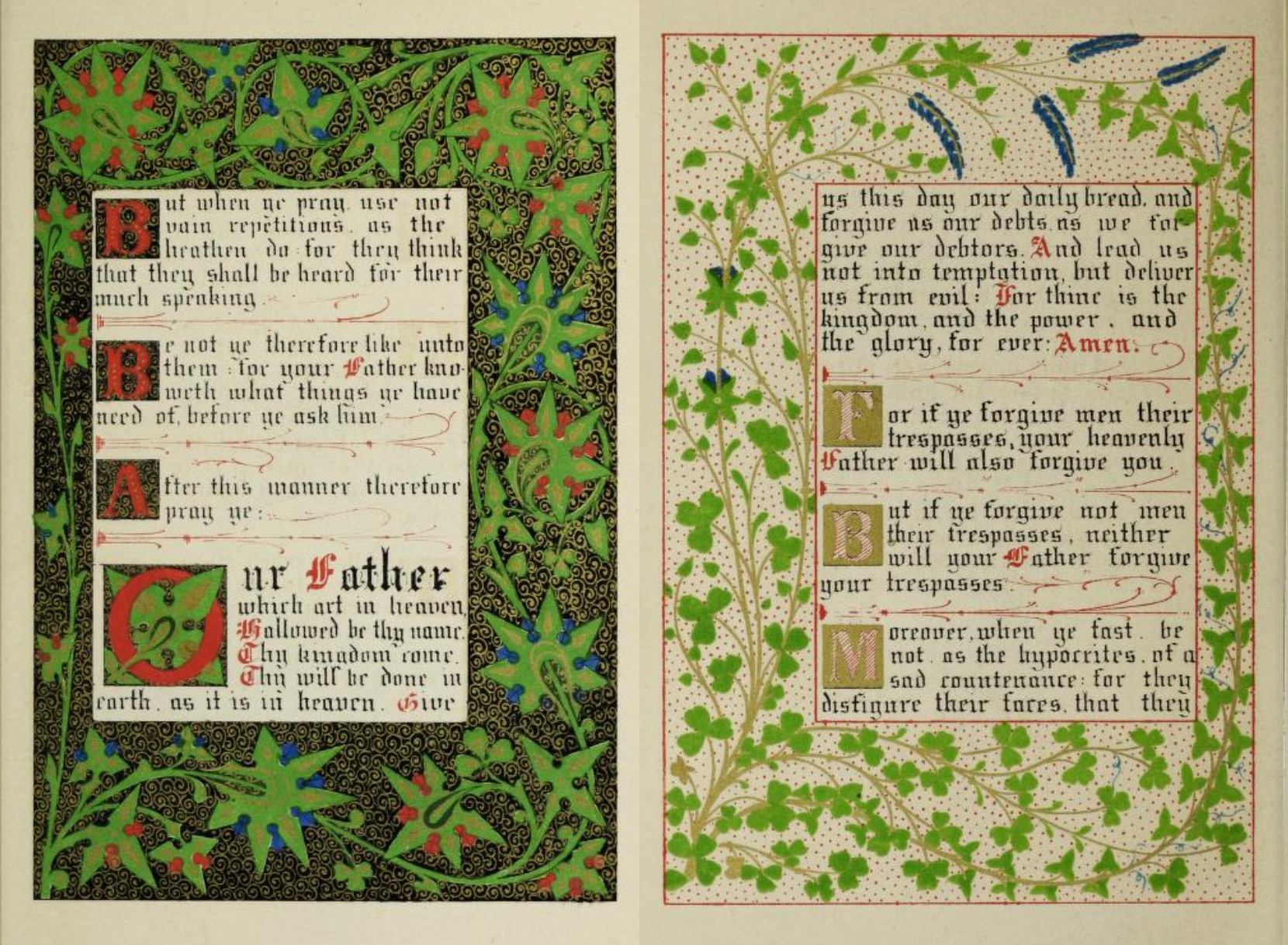
Matthew 6:7–16 from the 1845 illuminated book of The Sermon on the Mount, designed by Owen Jones.

In the King James Version of the Bible the text reads:

Thy kingdom come,
Thy will be done in
earth, as it is in heaven.

The World English Bible translates the passage as:

Let your Kingdom come.
Let your will be done, as
in heaven, so on earth.

The Novum Testamentum Graece text is:

ἐλθάτω ἡ βασιλεία σου
γενηθήτω τὸ θέλημά σου,
ὡς ἐν οὐρανῷ καὶ ἐπὶ γῆς

For a collection of other versions see BibleHub Matthew 6:10.

== Analysis ==
The opening of this verse, like the end of the last ones, echoes the Jewish Qaddish prayer. That prayer contained a call for the Kingdom of God to begin in one's lifetime.

Kingdom is a metaphor for the Kingdom of God that the Jewish messiah was meant to bring. At several places in the New Testament Jesus states that he has brought the kingdom, and that this kingdom is the Christian faith, not the worldly empire that had been expected. Fowler notes that some have thus argued that this prayer is out of date, that it was intended for a pre-Christian audience not one where Christianity is already established. One response to this is that Christianity is far from universal, and that this phrase is a call for the Kingdom of Christ to spread to those who do not yet believe. Even those who do believe are never perfect Christians, and some part of their heart is always left untouched, and this verse can thus be read as calling for the full adoption of Christianity. Alternatively it is common to see kingdom as having more than one meaning in the New Testament, and that while Jesus did inaugurate a new kingdom, this verse is eschatological and looking forward to the final end times.

There is also debate over how eschatological the third petition is. The will of God could refer to the power of God, the manifestation of his reign, and the last petition is simply an addendum to the second calling for God's power to be made manifest on Earth as clearly as it is in Heaven, a clear reference to the end times. The second interpretation is that the petition is a call for humans to obey God's will, his commandments and ethical teachings. A call for proper human behavior, rather than for divine intervention.

In the original Greek the phrase "in earth, as it is in heaven" is ambiguous. Either it can mean that things on Earth should become as they are in Heaven, or it could be read as stating that these things should be done in both Earth and Heaven. The first interpretation is the most common, and this gives us rare information about Heaven, making clear that in that realm God's will is fully enacted. It is uncertain whether this phrase is intended to only modify the last petition, or all three.

== Commentary from the Church Fathers ==
Glossa Ordinaria: It follows suitably, that after our adoption as sons, we should ask a kingdom which is due to sons.

Augustine: This is not so said as though God did not now reign on earth, or had not reigned over it always. Come, must therefore be taken for be manifested to men. For none shall then be ignorant of His kingdom, when His Only-begotten not in understanding only, but in visible shape shall come to judge the quick and dead. This day of judgment the Lord teaches shall then come, when the Gospel shall have been preached to all nations; which thing pertains to the hallowing of God's name.

Jerome: Either it is a general prayer for the kingdom of the whole world that the reign of the Devil may cease; or for the kingdom in each of us that God may reign there, and that sin may not reign in our mortal body.

Cyprian Or; it is that kingdom which was promised to us by God, and bought with Christ's blood; that we who before in the world have been servants, may afterwards reign under the dominion of Christ.

Augustine: For the kingdom of God will come whether we desire it or not. But herein we kindle our desires towards that kingdom, that it may come to us, and that we may reign in it.

Jerome: But be it noted, that it comes of high confidence, and of an unblemished conscience only, to pray for the kingdom of God, and not to fear the judgment.

Augustine: When they pray, Let thy kingdom come, what else do they pray for who are already holy, but that they may persevere in that holiness they now have given unto them? For no otherwise will the kingdom of God come, than as it is certain it will come to those that persevere unto the end.

Augustine: In that kingdom of blessedness the happy life will be made perfect in the Saints as it now is in the heavenly Angels; and therefore after the petition, Thy kingdom come, follows, Thy will be done as in heaven, so on earth. That is, as by the Angels who are in Heaven Thy will is done so as that they have fruition of Thee, no error clouding their knowledge, no pain marring their blessedness; so may it be done by Thy Saints who are on earth, and who, as to their bodies, are made of earth. So that, Thy will be done, is rightly understood as, ‘Thy commands be obeyed;’ as in heaven, so in earth, that is, as by Angels, so by men; not that they do what God would have them do, but they do because He would have them do it; that is, they do after His will.

Chrysostom: See how excellently this follows; having taught us to desire heavenly things by that which He said, Thy kingdom come, before we come to Heaven He bids us make this earth into Heaven, in that saying, Thy will be done as in heaven, so on earth.

Jerome: Let them be put to shame by this text who falsely affirm that there are daily falls (ruinas) in Heavenb.

Augustine: Or; as by the righteous, so by sinners; as if He had said, As the righteous do Thy will, so also may sinners; either by turning to Thee, or in receiving every man his just reward, which shall be in the last judgment. Or, by the heaven and the earth we may understand the spirit and the flesh. As the Apostle says, In my mind I obey the law of God, (Rom. 7:25.) we see the will of God done in the spirit, But in that change which is promised to the righteous there, Let thy will be done as in heaven, so in earth; that is, as the spirit does not resist God, so let the body not resist the spirit. Or; as in heaven, so in earth, as in Christ Jesus Himself, so in His Church; as in the Man who did His Father's will, so in the woman who is espoused of Him. And heaven and earth may be suitably understood as husband and wife, seeing it is of the heaven that the earth brings forth her fruits.

Cyprian: We ask not that God may do His own will, but that we may be enabled to do what He wills should be done by us; and that it may be done in us we stand in need of that will, that is, of God's aid and protection; for no man is strong by his own strength, but is safe in the indulgence and pity of God.

Chrysostom: For virtue is not of our own efforts, but of grace from above. Here again is enjoined on each one of us prayer for the whole world, inasmuch as we are not to say, Thy will be done in me, or in us; but throughout the earth, that error may cease, truth be planted, malice be banished, and virtue return, and thus the earth not differ from heaven.

Augustine: From this passage is clearly shown against the Pelagians that the beginning of faith is God's gift, when Holy Church prays for unbelievers that they may begin to have faith. Moreover, seeing it is done already in the Saints, why do they yet pray that it may be done, but that they pray that they may persevere in that they have begun to be?

Pseudo-Chrysostom: These words, As in heaven so in earth, must be taken as common to all three preceding petitions. Observe also how carefully it is worded; He said not, Father, hallow Thy name in us, Let Thy kingdom come on us, Do Thy will in us. Nor again; Let us hallow Thy name, Let us enter into Thy kingdom, Let us do Thy will; that it should not seem to be either God's doing only, or man's doing only. But He used a middle form of speech, and the impersonal verb; for as man can do nothing good without God's aid, so neither does God work good in man unless man wills it.

Preceded by Matthew 6:9	Gospel of Matthew; Chapter 6	Succeeded by Matthew 6:11
