= Herbert Basser =

Canadian academic

Herbert W. Basser (born 1942) is a Canadian scholar of religion and a Jewish theologian known for his work Studies in Exegesis: Christian Critiques of Jewish Law (Boston, 2000).

== Biography ==
In 1963, he graduated from Yeshiva University with a Bachelor of Arts in French literature. After several years as a mathematics teacher, he continued his studies at the University of Toronto in Toronto, Ontario, Canada earning a Master of Arts in 1979 and a Ph.D. in 1983.

Basser has held the Harvard Starr Fellowship at Harvard University, taught at Hebrew University of Jerusalem, the University of Toronto, and the University of California, Berkeley. He has been teaching religious studies at Queen's University in Canada since 1980.

== Thought ==
Basser is perhaps best known for his view that scholars of early Christianity have not given sufficient study to rabbinic writings of the time, therefore resulting in a limited understanding how Christianity developed from the Jewish religious tradition.

== Bibliography ==
- Annotations to James in The Jewish Annotated New Testament, Oxford University Press 2011, 2017
- The Gospel of Matthew and Judaic Traditions: A relevance based commentary, Leiden and Boston, Brill, 2015 (with Marsha B. Cohen).
- The Mind behind the Gospels: A Commentary to Mathew 1 – 14, Brighton: Academic Studies Press, 2009.
- Studies in Exegesis: Christian Critiques of Jewish Law and Rabbinic Responses 70-300 C.E. Leiden, Boston: E. J. Brill, 2000. Reprint paper 2002.
- Pseudo-Rabad; Commentary to Sifre Numbers, Atlanta: Scholars Press, 1998.
- Pseudo-Rabad: Commentary to Sifre Deuteronomy, Atlanta: Scholars Press, 1994.
- Approaches to Ancient Judaism V (Introduced and edited by H. Basser), Atlanta: Scholars Press, 1993.
- The Mystical Study of Ruth: Midrash HaNe'elam of the Zohar to the Book of Ruth, Atlanta: Scholars Press, 1993. (Lawrence Englander with Herbert Basser).
- Moses Kimhi: Commentary on the Book of Job, Atlanta: Scholars Press, 1992. (Herbert Basser and Barry Walfish).
- In the Margins of the Midrash, Atlanta: Scholars Press, 1990.
- Midrashic Interpretations of the Song of Moses, Berne and New York: Peter Lang, 1984.
