= Jean Carmignac =

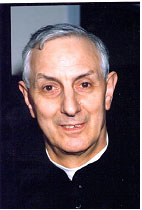
- Jean Carmignac
- Born: 7 August 1914; Paris
- Died: 2 October 1986 (aged 72); Viroflay
- Occupation: biblical scholar
- Known for: The Birth of the Synoptics (Michael J. Wrenn, trans.; Chicago: Franciscan Herald Press, 1987)

Abbé Jean Carmignac (7 August 1914–2 October 1986) was a French biblical scholar who founded the journal Revue de Qumran in 1958. He achieved distinction also by publishing early on, with colleagues P. Guilbert, É Cothennet, and H. Lignée, two volumes of translation and commentary on the major scrolls. After his death a special edition of Revue de Qumran (vol. 13, 1988) was prepared in his honor. Carmignac was also the author of The Birth of the Synoptics (Michael J. Wrenn, trans.; Chicago: Franciscan Herald Press, 1987).

== Views ==
Carmignac in 1963, during his work with the Dead Sea Scrolls, attempted to translate Mark from Greek to Hebrew for his use in a New Testament commentary based on the Dead Sea Scrolls. He expected many difficulties but unexpectedly discovered that the translation was not only easy, but seemed to point to Greek Mark as a translation from a Hebrew or Aramaic original.

Carmignac's discovery prompted further investigation, which yielded much evidence for a Hebrew origin for Mark and Matthew, and for a Lukan source. Among the nine types of Semitisms identified among the three Synoptics, Semitisms of Transmission are probably the strongest evidence for at least Mark and possibly Matthew as direct translations from a Hebrew original text. For example, "Mark 11:14 speaks of eating of the fruit = YWKL (according to the spelling of Qumran) and Matthew 21:19 to produce fruit YWBL: as the letters B and K resemble each other [in Qumran Hebrew] so greatly, the possibility for confusion is very likely." Carmignac's book The Birth of the Synoptics contains dozens of such evidences. He had intended to produce a comprehensive volume but passed away before this work could be produced.

== Main works ==
- La règle de la guerre des Fils de lumière contre les Fils de ténèbres ౼ Texte restauré, traduit et commenté, éd. Letouzey & Ané, 1958.
- Le Docteur de Justice et Jésus-Christ, éd. de l'Orante, 1957.
- Les Textes de Qumrân traduits et annotés, éd. Letouzey & Ané, 2 volumes, 1961 and 1964.
- Recherches sur le « Notre Père », éd. Letouzey & Ané, 1969.
- Le mirage de l'Eschatologie – Royauté, Règne et Royaume de Dieu... sans Eschatologie, éd. Letouzey & Ané, 1979.
- À l'écoute du « Notre Père », éd. F.-X. de Guibert, 1984.
- La Naissance des Évangiles synoptiques, éd. F.-X. de Guibert, 1984.
- The Birth of the Synoptics (Michael J. Wrenn, trans.; Chicago: Franciscan Herald Press, 1987).
- Le Magnificat et le Benedictus en hébreu?, posthumous work published by the Association des Amis de l'Abbé Jean Carmignac (2009).
