= Peter of Laodicea =

Peter of Laodicea was a Christian scholar of the 7th–8th centuries. He was likely a bishop of Laodicea, but next to nothing is known about him. He was the author of commentaries on the New Testament.
