= Matthew 8:24 =

- ← 8:23 8:25 →
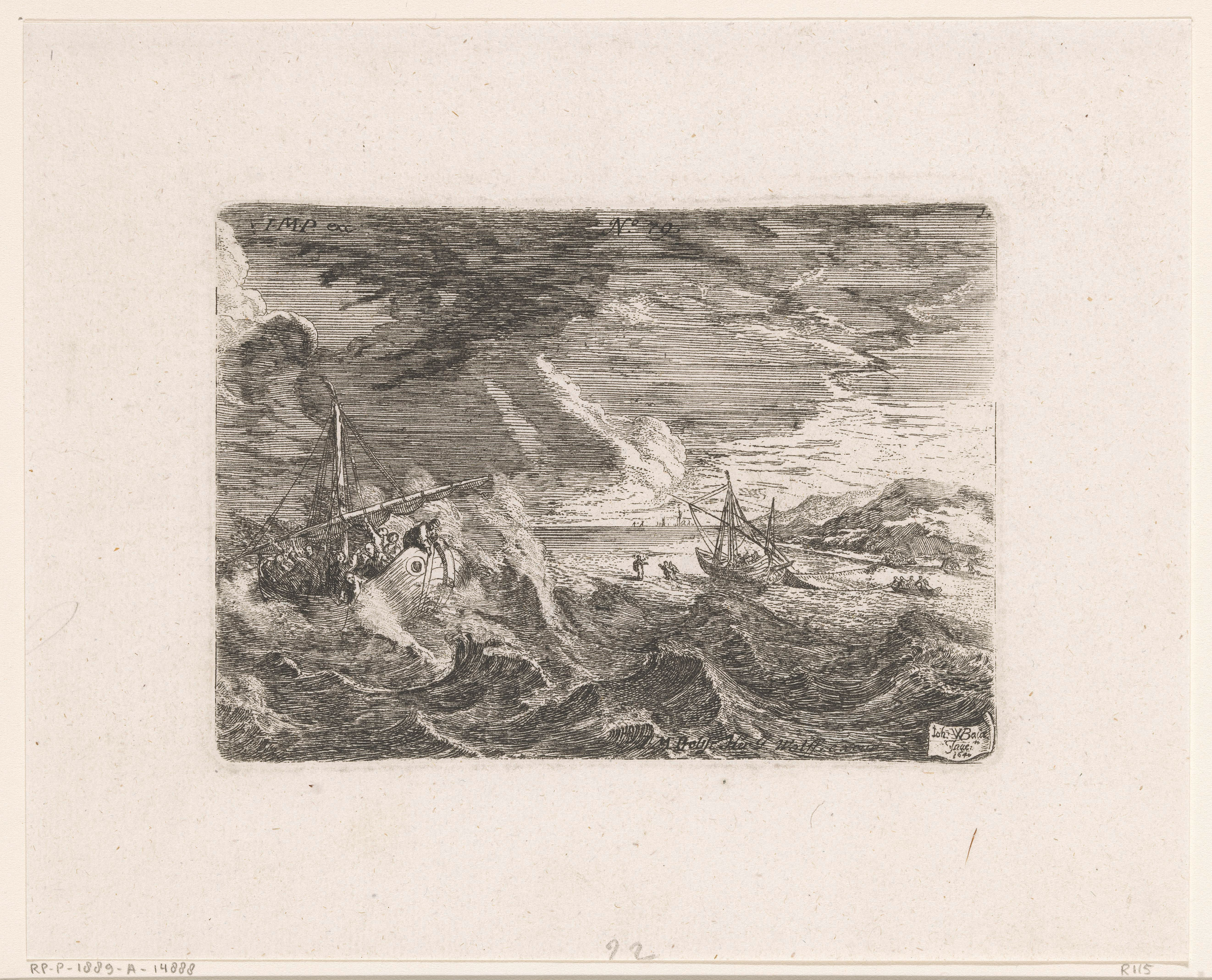
- "The storm on the Sea of Galilee", by Johann Michael Probst (1640).
- Book: Gospel of Matthew
- Christian Bible part: New Testament

Matthew 8:24 is the 24th verse in the eighth chapter of the Gospel of Matthew in the New Testament.

== Content ==
In the original Greek according to Westcott-Hort this verse is:

Καὶ ἰδού, σεισμὸς μέγας ἐγένετο ἐν τῇ θαλάσσῃ, ὥστε τὸ πλοῖον καλύπτεσθαι ὑπὸ τῶν κυμάτων· αὐτὸς δὲ ἐκάθευδε.

In the King James Version of the Bible the text reads:

And, behold, there arose a great tempest in the sea, insomuch that the ship was covered with the waves: but he was asleep.

The New International Version translates the passage as:

Without warning, a furious storm came up on the lake, so that the waves swept over the boat. But Jesus was sleeping.

For a collection of other versions see BibleHub Matthew 8:24.

== Analysis ==
The Greek word σεισμὸς used in this verse for a storm is generally used for earthquakes. The more common word is λαιλαψ which is used in Luke 8:25 and Mark 4:37.

Lapide gives many possible reasons for the storm, which from its sudden nature points to Jesus' divine hand at work. 1) That Jesus might show his power on land and sea (See Rev 10:2 for similar imagery); 2) that Jesus might give the disciples a foretaste of persecutions they would soon face after his ascension; 3) that through his calming the storm his disciples might believe him to be divine.

Origen states that, "Christ slept with respect to His body, but was awake in terms of to His Deity." The sleep of Jonah when the ship was in peril appears to be a type of this.

== Commentary from the Church Fathers ==
Adamantius (Pseudo-Origen): "Therefore, having entered into the boat He caused the sea to rise; And, lo, there arose a great tempest in the sea, so that the boat was covered by the waves. This tempest did not arise of itself, but in obedience to the power of Him Who gave commandment, who brings the winds out of his treasures. (Jer. 10:13.) There arose a great tempest, that a great work might be wrought; because by how much the more the waves rushed into the boat, so much the more were the disciples troubled, and sought to be delivered by the wonderful power of the Saviour."

Chrysostom: "They had seen others made partakers of Christ’s mercies, but forasmuch as no man has so strong a sense of those things that are done in the person of another as of what is done to himself, it behoved that in their own bodies they should feel Christ’s mercies. Therefore He willed that this tempest should arise, that in their deliverance they might have a more lively sense of His goodness. This tossing of the sea was a type of their future trials of which Paul speaks, I would not have you ignorant, brethren, how that we were troubled beyond our strength. (2 Cor. 1:8.) But that there might be time for their fear to arise, it follows, But he was asleep. For if the storm had arisen while He was awake, they would either not have feared, or not have prayed Him, or would not have believed that He had the power to still it."

Preceded by Matthew 8:23	Gospel of Matthew; Chapter 8	Succeeded by Matthew 8:25
