= Matthew 8:27 =

- ← 8:26 8:28 →
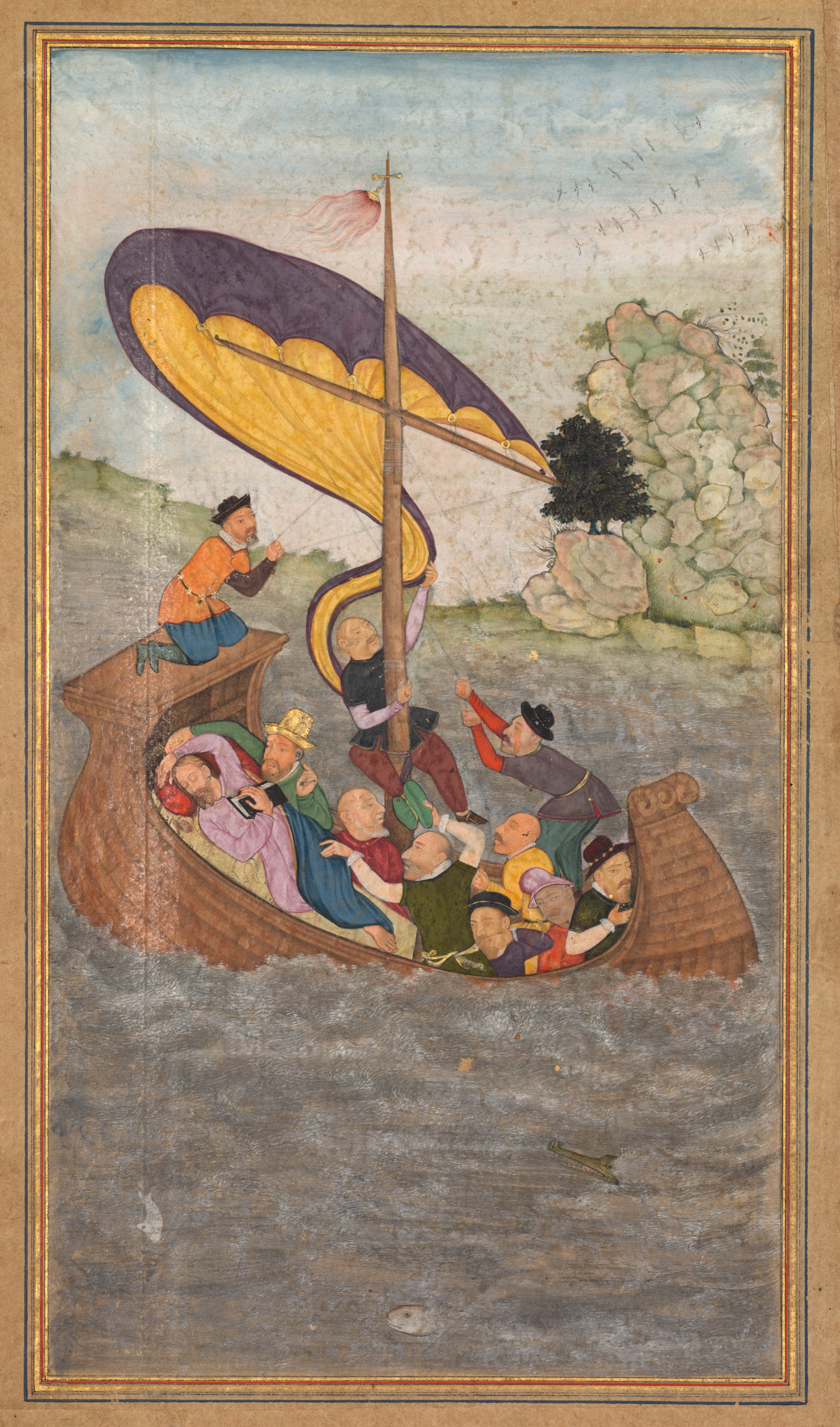
- "Jesus being awakened during a tempest on the Sea of Galilee", from a Mirror of Holiness (Mir’at al-quds) of Father Jerome Xavier
- Book: Gospel of Matthew
- Christian Bible part: New Testament

Matthew 8:27 is a verse in the eighth chapter of the Gospel of Matthew in the New Testament.

== Content ==
In the original Greek according to Westcott-Hort this verse is:

Οἱ δὲ ἄνθρωποι ἐθαύμασαν, λέγοντες, Ποταπός ἐστιν οὗτος, ὅτι καὶ οἱ ἄνεμοι καὶ ἡ θάλασσα ὑπακούουσιν αὐτῷ.

In the King James Version of the Bible the text reads:

But the men marvelled, saying, What manner of man is this, that even the winds and the sea obey him!

The New International Version translates the passage as:

The men were amazed and asked, "What kind of man is this? Even the winds and the waves obey him!"

For a collection of other versions see BibleHub Matthew 8:27.

== Commentary from the Church Fathers ==
Glossa Ordinaria: "Chrysostom explains thus, What manner of man is this? His sleeping and His appearance showed the man; the sea and the calm pointed out the God."

Adamantius (Pseudo-Origen): "But who were the men that marvelled? You must not think that the Apostles are here meant, for we never find the Lord's disciples mentioned with disrespect; they are always called either the Disciples or the Apostles. They marvelled then who sailed with Him, whose was the boat."

Jerome: "But if any shall contend that it was the disciples who wondered, we shall answer they are rightly spoken of as ‘the men’, seeing they had not yet learnt the power of the Saviour."

Adamantius (Pseudo-Origen): "This is not a question, What manner of man is this? but an affirmation that He is one whom the winds and the sea obey. What manner of man then is this? that is, how powerful, how mighty, how great! He commands every creature, and they transgress not His law; men alone disobey, and are therefore condemned by His judgment. Figuratively; We are all embarked in the vessel of the Holy Church, and voyaging through this stormy world with the Lord. The Lord Himself sleeps a merciful sleep while we suffer, and awaits the repentance of the wicked."

Hilary of Poitiers: "Or; He sleeps, because by our sloth He is cast asleep in us. This is done that we may hope aid from God in fear of danger; and that hope though late may be confident that it shall escape danger by the might of Christ watching within."

Adamantius (Pseudo-Origen): "Let us therefore come to Him with joy, saying with the Prophet, Arise, O Lord, why sleepest thou? (Ps. 44:23.) And He will command the winds, that is, the dæmons, who raise the waves, that is, the rulers of the world, to persecute the saints, and He shall make a great calm around both body and spirit, peace for the Church, stillness for the world."

Rabanus Maurus: "Otherwise; The sea is the turmoil of the world; the boat in which Christ is embarked is to be understood the tree of the cross, by the aid of which the faithful having passed the waves of the world, arrive in their heavenly country, as on a safe shore, whither Christ goes with His own; whence He says below, He that will come after me, let him deny himself, and take up his cross, and follow me. (Mat. 16:24.) When then Christ was fixed on the cross, a great commotion was raised, the minds of His disciples being troubled at His passion, and the boat was covered by the waves. For the whole strength of persecution was around the cross of Christ, on which He died; as it is here, But he was asleep. His sleep is death. The disciples awaken the Lord, when troubled at His death; they seek His resurrection with earnest prayers, saying, Save us, by rising again; we perish, by our trouble at Thy death. He rises again, and rebukes the hardness of their hearts, as we read in other places. He commands the winds, in that He overthrew the power of the Devil; He commanded the sea, in that He disappointed the malice of the Jews; and there was a great calm, because the minds of the disciples were calmed when they beheld His resurrection."

Bede: "Or; The boat is the present Church, in which Christ passes over the sea of this world with His own, and stills the waves of persecution. Wherefore we may wonder, and give thanks."

== Later commentary ==
Cornelius a Lapide believes these men were not the disciples, but rather sailors and others who were in the ships because normally the apostles or disciples were named as such. There was much wonder since the miracle seemed to surpass those of Moses. Pope Francis sees this verse as a mark of Jesus living "in full harmony with creation".

Preceded by Matthew 8:26	Gospel of Matthew; Chapter 8	Succeeded by Matthew 8:28
