= Matthew 8:30 =

- ← 8:29 8:31 →
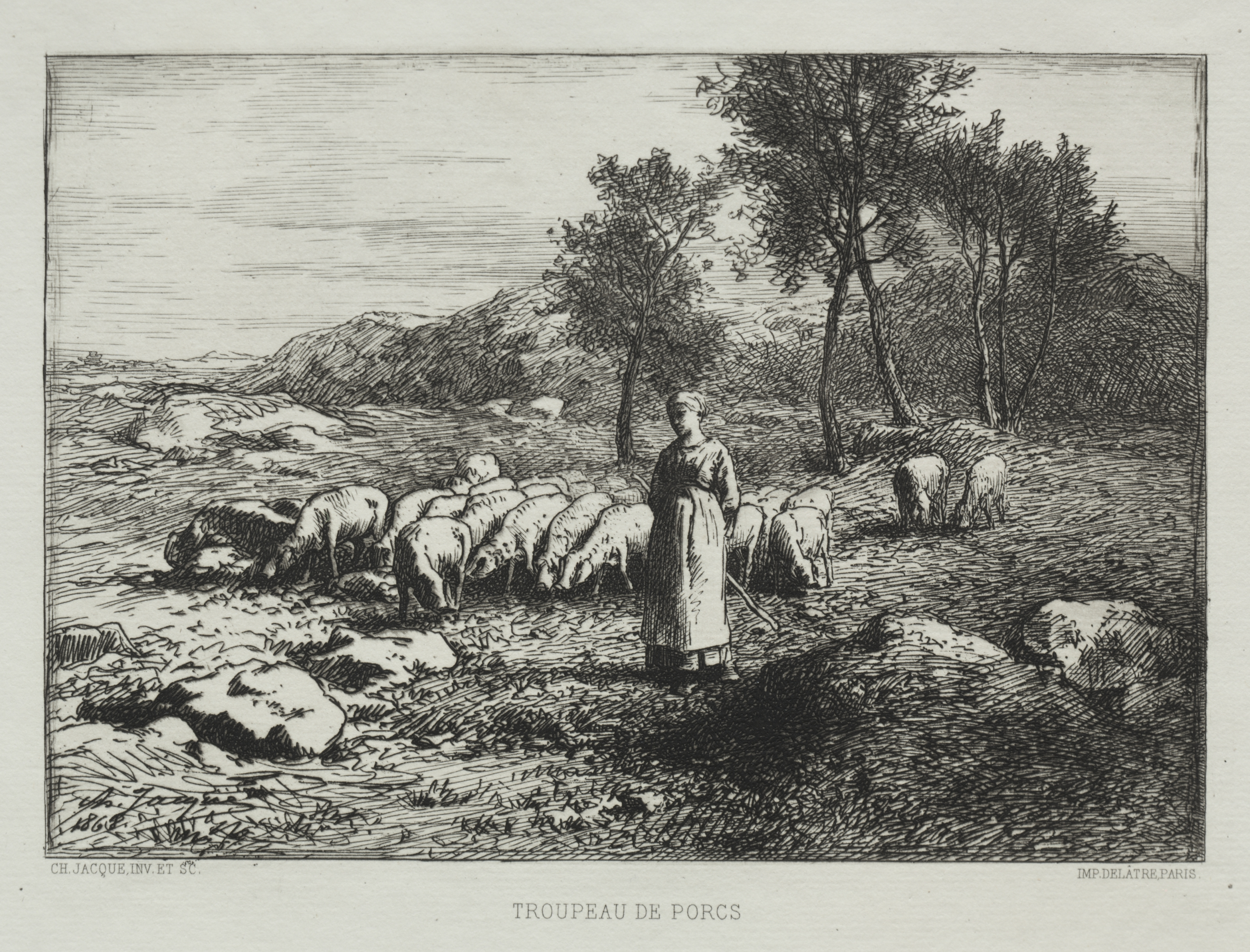
- "Herd of Swine" by Charles-Émile Jacque (1868)
- Book: Gospel of Matthew
- Christian Bible part: New Testament

Matthew 8:30 is the 30th verse in the eighth chapter of the Gospel of Matthew in the New Testament.

== Content ==
In the original Greek according to Westcott-Hort, Textus Receptus and Byzantine Majority, this verse is:

Ἦν δὲ μακρὰν ἀπ᾿ αὐτῶν ἀγέλη χοίρων πολλῶν βοσκομένη.

In the King James Version of the Bible the text reads:

And there was a good way off from them an herd of many swine feeding.

The New International Version translates the passage as:

Some distance from them a large herd of pigs was feeding.

For a collection of other versions see BibleHub Matthew 8:30.

== Analysis ==
This verse is a part of the narrative to show Jesus' authority and his relationship to the Gentiles (cf. Matthew 8:5–13). The location in the Decapolis and the fact that swine are being raised nearby indicate a non-Jewish area, along the east coast of the Sea of Galilee where the population was mixed. The Jews do not eat pork, but Roman soldiers did, so the swine may have been kept to supply the food for the Roman 'legion'. Augustus was reported to have said that 'it was better to be "Herod's swine than son"', seemingly implying that Herod did keep swine herds on his estates, perhaps for supplying the Romans. The scene with pigs in the passage provides irony and humor which are familiar to Matthew's Jewish audience.

== Sources ==
- Allison, Dale C. Jr. (2007). "57. Matthew". In Barton, John; Muddiman, John (eds.). The Oxford Bible Commentary (first (paperback) ed.). Oxford University Press. pp. 844–886. ISBN 978-0-19-927718-6.
- Coogan, Michael David (2007). Coogan, Michael David; Brettler, Marc Zvi; Newsom, Carol Ann; Perkins, Pheme (eds.). The New Oxford Annotated Bible with the Apocryphal/Deuterocanonical Books: New Revised Standard Version, Issue 48 (Augmented 3rd ed.). Oxford University Press. ISBN 978-0-19-528881-0.

Preceded by Matthew 8:29	Gospel of Matthew; Chapter 8	Succeeded by Matthew 8:31
