= Matthew 8:22 =

- ← 8:21 8:23 →
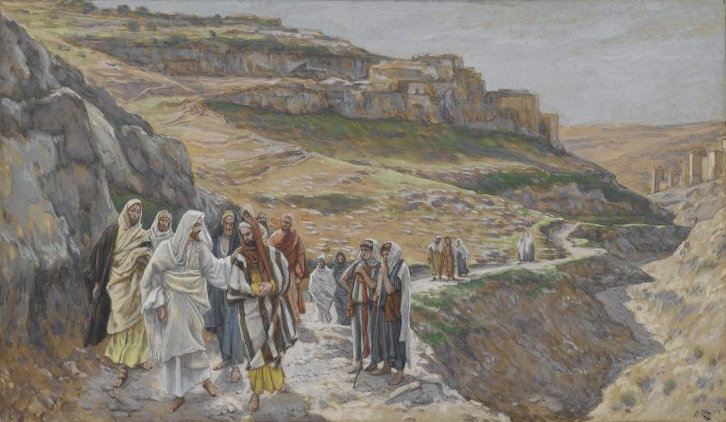
- "Jesus Discourses with His Disciples" by James Tissot (between 1886 and 1894).
- Book: Gospel of Matthew
- Christian Bible part: New Testament

Matthew 8:22 is the 22nd verse in the eighth chapter of the Gospel of Matthew in the New Testament of the Christian Bible.

== Content ==
In the original Greek according to Westcott-Hort this verse is:

Ὁ δὲ Ἰησοῦς εἶπεν αὐτῷ, Ἀκολούθει μοι, καὶ ἄφες τοὺς νεκροὺς θάψαι τοὺς ἑαυτῶν νεκρούς.

In the King James Version of the Bible the text reads:

But Jesus said unto him, Follow me; and let the dead bury their dead.

The New International Version translates the passage as:

But Jesus told him, "Follow me, and let the dead bury their own dead." (Note: For a collection of other versions see Matthew 8:22.)

== Analysis ==
Lapide says concerning this verse that "Christ does not intend to condemn the burial of the dead," because this was widely considered an important work of mercy in Jewish Israel (see book of Tobit). Instead, he sought to teach that when God summons or commands someone, his summons should be immediately obeyed, above human summons or commands. This same issue comes up in Acts 6, when the disciples appoint deacons to deal with acts of mercy such as feeding widows. The same message is also heard in 2 Timothy 2, where Paul writes, "No man, being a soldier to God, entangles himself with worldly business" (cf. 2 Timothy 2:4,9).

The dead here referred to by Jesus are thought to be those that are 'spiritually' dead, rather than physically dead.

== Commentary from the Church Fathers ==
Augustine: "The Lord when He prepares men for the Gospel will not have any excuse of this fleshly and temporal attachment to interfere, therefore it follows; Jesus said unto him, Follow me, and, leave the dead to bury their dead."

Chrysostom: "This saying does not condemn natural affection to our parents, but shows that nothing ought to be more binding on us than the business of heaven; that to this we ought to apply ourselves with all our endeavours, and not to be slack, however necessary or urgent are the things that draw us aside. For what could be more necessary than to bury a father? What more easy? For it could not need much time. But in this the Lord rescued him from much evil, weeping, and mourning, and from the pains of expectation. For after the funeral there must come examination of the will, division of the inheritance, and other things of the same sort; and thus trouble following trouble, like the waves, would have borne him far from the port of truth. But if you are not yet satisfied, reflect further that oftentimes the weak are not permitted to know the time, or to follow to the grave; even though the dead be father, mother, or son; yet are they not charged with cruelty that hinder them; it is rather the reverse of cruelty. And it is a much greater evil to draw one away from spiritual discourse; especially when there were who should perform the rites; as here, Leave the dead to bury their dead."

Augustine: "As much as to say; Thy father is dead; but there are also other dead who shall bury their dead, because they are in unbelief."

Chrysostom: "This moreover shows that this dead man was not his; for, I suppose, he that was dead was of the unbelieving. If you wonder at the young man, that in a matter so necessary he should have asked Jesus, and not have gone away of his own accord, wonder much more that he abode with Jesus after he was forbidden to depart; which was not from lack of affection, but that he might not interrupt a business yet more necessary."

Hilary of Poitiers: "Also, because we are taught in the beginning of the Lord’s prayer, first to say, Our Father, which art in heaven; and since this disciple represents the believing people; he is here reminded that he has one only Father in heaven (Matthew 23:9), and that between a believing son and an unbelieving Father the filial relation does not hold good. We are also admonished that the unbelieving dead are not to be mingled with the memories of the saints, and that they are also dead who live out of God; and the dead are buried by the dead, because by the faith of God it behoves the living to cleave to the living."

Jerome: "But if the dead shall bury the dead, we ought not to be careful for the dead but for the living, lest while we are anxious for the dead, we ourselves should be counted dead."

Gregory the Great: "The dead also bury the dead, when sinners protect sinners. They who exalt sinners with their praises, hide the dead under a pile of words."

Rabanus Maurus: "From this we may also take occasion to observe, that lesser goods are to be sometimes forfeited for the sake of securing greater."

Augustine: "Matthew relates that this was done when He gave them commandment that they should go over the lake, Luke, that it happened as they walked by the way; which is no contradiction, for they must have walked by the way that they might come to the lake."

== Notes ==
Preceded by Matthew 8:21	Gospel of Matthew; Chapter 8	Succeeded by Matthew 8:23
