= Matthew 8:23 =

- ← 8:22 8:24 →
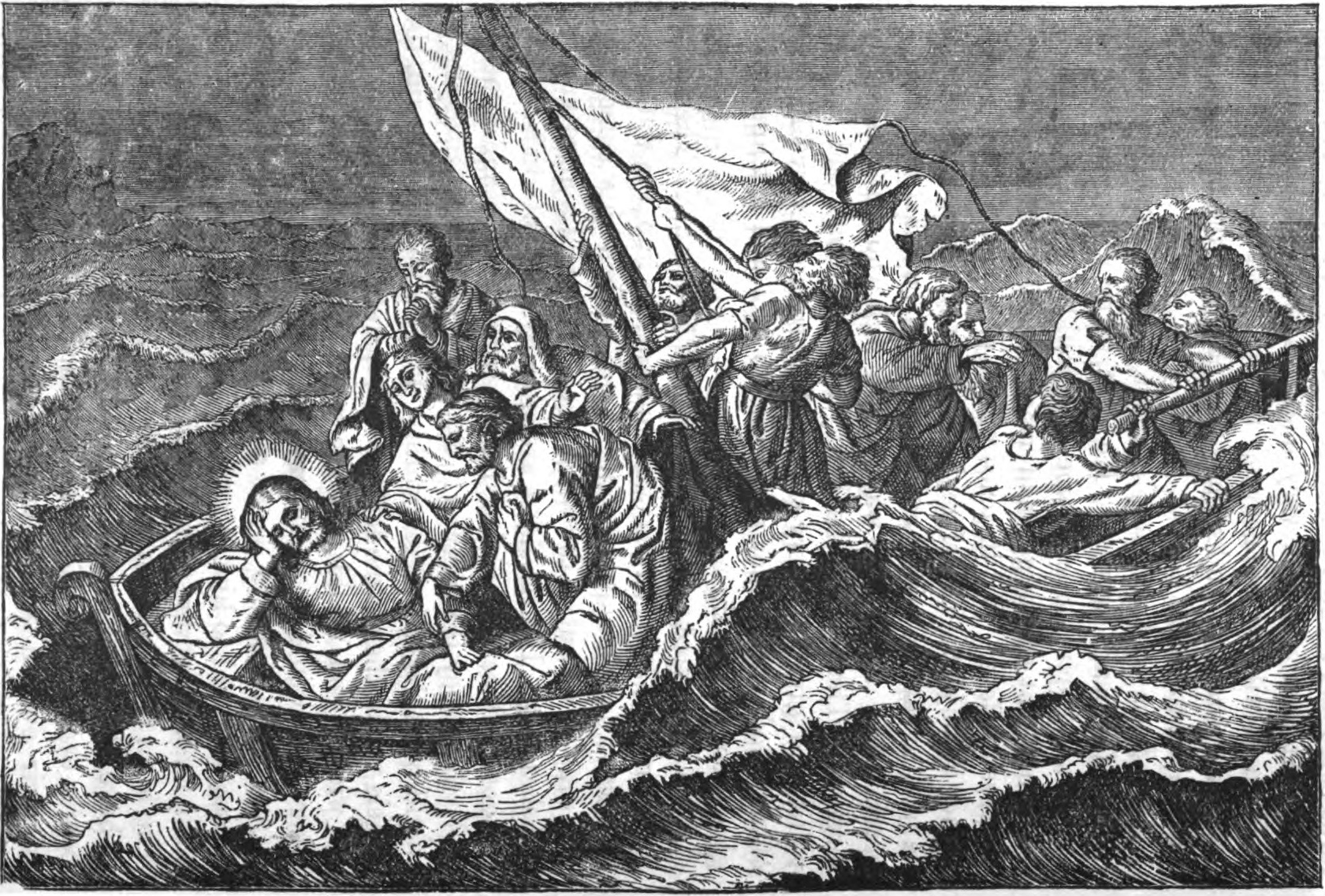
- "Jesus and his disciples on the sea of Galilee" (1873)
- Book: Gospel of Matthew
- Christian Bible part: New Testament

Matthew 8:23 is the 23rd verse in the eighth chapter of the Gospel of Matthew in the New Testament of the Christian Bible.

== Content ==
In the original Greek according to Westcott-Hort this verse is:

Καὶ ἐμβάντι αὐτῷ εἰς τὸ πλοῖον, ἠκολούθησαν αὐτῷ οἱ μαθηταὶ αὐτοῦ.

In the King James Version of the Bible the text reads:

And when he was entered into a ship, his disciples followed him.

The New International Version translates the passage as:

Then he got into the boat and his disciples followed him.

For a collection of other versions see BibleHub Matthew 8:23.

== Commentary ==
The Vulgate for this verse has navicula, “a little ship,” because they were small boats, which were used for crossing the lake, and normally they were used for fishing. Mark 4:36 adds, "they received him as he was," i.e., as he was teaching the people who were standing on the shore.

== Commentary from the Church Fathers ==
Adamantius (Pseudo-Origen): "Christ having performed many great and wonderful things on the land, passes to the sea, that there also He might show forth His excellent power, presenting Himself before all men as the Lord of both earth and sea. And when he was entered into a boat, his disciples followed him, not being weak but strong and established in the faith. Thus they followed Him not so much treading in His footsteps, as accompanying Him in holiness of spirit."

Chrysostom: "He took His disciples with Him, and in a boat, that they might learn two lessons; first, not to be confounded in dangers, secondly, to think lowly of themselves in honour. That they should not think great things of themselves because He kept them while He sent the rest away, He suffers them to be tossed by the waves. Where miracles were to be shown, He suffers the people to be present; where temptations and fears were to be stilled, there He takes with Him only the victors of the world, whom He would prepare for strife."

Preceded by Matthew 8:22	Gospel of Matthew; Chapter 8	Succeeded by Matthew 8:24
