= Matthew 8:31 =

- ← 8:30 8:32 →
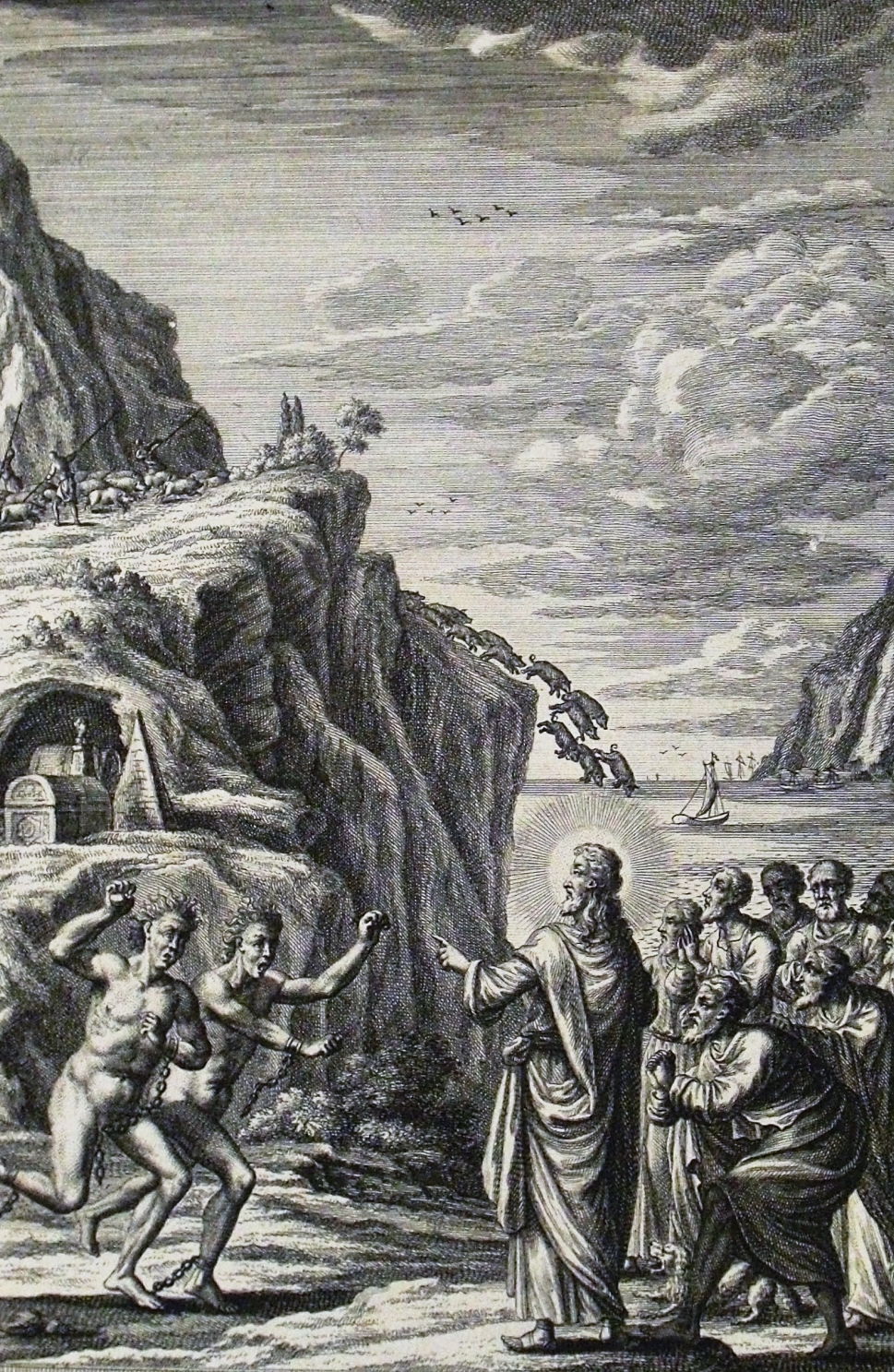
- "Christ drives them into the swine" (Matthew 8.28-32), by Pieter van der Borcht (ca. 1540-1608)
- Book: Gospel of Matthew
- Christian Bible part: New Testament

Matthew 8:31 is 31st verse in the eighth chapter of the Gospel of Matthew in the New Testament.

== Content ==
In the original Greek according to Westcott-Hort this verse is:

Οἱ δὲ δαίμονες παρεκάλουν αὐτόν, λέγοντες, Εἰ ἐκβάλλεις ἡμᾶς, ἐπίτρεψον ἡμῖν ἀπελθεῖν εἰς τὴν ἀγέλην τῶν χοίρων.

In the King James Version of the Bible the text reads:

So the devils besought him, saying, If thou cast us out, suffer us to go away into the herd of swine.

The New International Version translates the passage as:

The demons begged Jesus, "If you drive us out, send us into the herd of pigs."

For a collection of other versions see BibleHub Matthew 8:31.

== Analysis ==
Mark 5:11 tells us that the herd was made up of "about two thousand swine."

Why exactly Jewish people would be keeping swine is open to debate. A couple of theories are, 1) to sell to the Gentiles for the use of Roman soldiers, 2) to provide lard for the greasing of chariot wheels.

Lapide puts forward three possibilities as to why the demons make this request: 1) being unable to injure people directly they sought to injure their possessions; 2) that they might stir up the malice those that dwelt in the region (which is what happened); 3) "clean spirits delight in unclean things" (i.e. the swine).

== Commentary from the Church Fathers ==
Augustine: "Though the words of the dæmons are variously reported by the three Evangelists, yet this is no difficulty; for they either all convey the same sense, or may be supposed to have been all spoken. Nor again because in Matthew they speak in the plural, in the others in the singular number; because even the other two Evangelists relate that when asked his name, he answered, Legion, showing that the dæmons were many. Now there was not far from thence a herd of many swine feeding; and the dæmons prayed him, saying, If thou cast us out hence, send us into the swine."

Gregory the Great: "For the Devil knows that of himself he has no power to do any thing, because it is not of himself that he exists as a spirit."

Saint Remigius: "They did not ask to be sent into men, because they saw Him by whose excellence they were tortured existing in human shape. Nor did they ask to be sent into sheep, because sheep are by God’s institution clean animals, and were then offered in the temple of God. But they requested to be sent into the swine rather than into any of the other unclean animals, because this is of all animals the most unclean; whence also it has its name ‘porcus,’ as being ‘spurcus,’ filthy, and delighting in filthiness; and dæmons also delight in the filthiness of sin. They did not pray that they might be sent into the air, because of their eager desire of hurting men. And he saith unto them, Go."

| Preceded by Matthew 8:30 | Gospel of Matthew; Chapter 8 | Succeeded by Matthew 8:32 |
