= Matthew 8:26 =

- ← 8:25 8:27 →
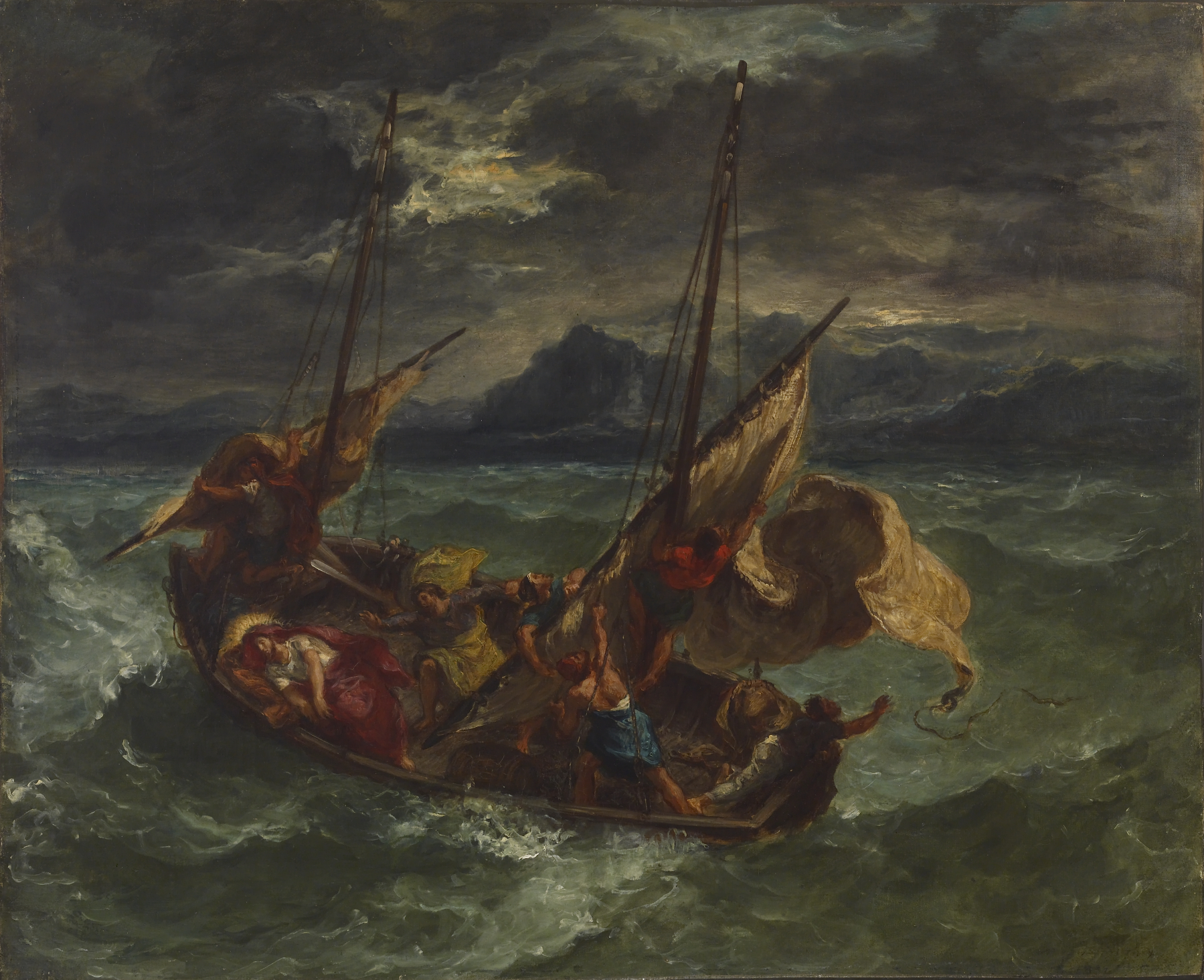
- "Christ on the Sea of Galilee". Eugène Delacroix (1854)
- Book: Gospel of Matthew
- Christian Bible part: New Testament

Matthew 8:26 is a verse in the eighth chapter of the Gospel of Matthew in the New Testament.

== Content ==
In the original Greek according to Westcott-Hort this verse is:

Καὶ λέγει αὐτοῖς, Τί δειλοί ἐστε, ὀλιγόπιστοι; Τότε ἐγερθεὶς ἐπετίμησε τοῖς ἀνέμοις καὶ τῇ θαλάσσῃ, καὶ ἐγένετο γαλήνη μεγάλη.

In the King James Version of the Bible the text reads:

And he saith unto them, Why are ye fearful, O ye of little faith? Then he arose, and rebuked the winds and the sea; and there was a great calm.

The New International Version translates the passage as:

He replied, "You of little faith, why are you so afraid?" Then he got up and rebuked the winds and the waves, and it was completely calm.

For a collection of other versions see BibleHub Matthew 8:26.

== Analysis ==
This statement, "O ye of little faith?" Matthew records before the miracle, but Mark and Luke afterwards. MacEvilly notes that the statement was appropriate for, "they had on board the Lord God, whose Divine eye never sleeps."

Then Jesus rebukes. In Greek this is ἐπετίμησε which corresponds to the Hebrew גער gaar. In Mark we have Jesus telling the sea literally, "Be silent, be muzzled."

Most commentators take the boat as a figure of the church which is persecuted by the turbulent, stormy world.

== Commentary from the Church Fathers ==
Adamantius (Pseudo-Origen): "O ye true disciples! ye have the Saviour with you, and do ye fear danger? Life itself is among you, and are ye afraid of death? They would answer, We are yet children, and weak, and are therefore afraid; whence it follows, Jesus saith unto them, Why are ye afraid, O ye of little faith? As though He had said, If ye have known me mighty upon earth, why believe ye not that I am also mighty upon the sea? And even though death were threatening you, ought ye not to support it with constancy? He who believes a little will be reasoned with; he who believes not at all will be neglected."

Chrysostom: "If any should say, that this was a sign of no small faith to go and rouse Jesus; it is rather a sign that they had not a right opinion concerning Him. They knew that when wakened He could rebuke the waves, but they did not yet know that He could do it while sleeping. For this cause He did not do this wonder in the presence of the multitudes, that they should not be charged with their little faith; but He takes His disciples apart to correct them, and first stills the raging of the waters. Then he arose, and rebuked the winds and the sea, and there was a great calm."

Jerome: "From this passage we understand, that all creation is conscious of its Creator; for what may be rebuked and commanded is conscious of the mind commanding. I do not mean as some heretics hold, that the whole creation is animated—but by the power of the Maker things which to us have no consciousness have to Him."

Adamantius (Pseudo-Origen): "Therefore He gave commandment to the winds and the sea, and from a great storm it became a great calm. For it behoves Him that is great to do great things; therefore He who first greatly stirred the depths of the sea, now again commands a great calm, that the disciples who had been too much troubled might have great rejoicing."

Chrysostom: "Observe also that the storm is stilled at once entirely, and no trace of disturbance appears; which is beyond nature; for when a storm ceases in the course of nature, yet the water is wont to be agitated for some time longer, but here all is tranquillity at once. Thus what is said of the Father, He spake, and the storm of wind ceased, (Ps. 107:25.) this Christ fulfilled in deed; for by His word and bidding only He stayed and checked the waters. For from His appearance, from His sleeping, and His using a boat, they that were present supposed Him a man only, and on this account they fell into admiration of Him; And the men marvelled, saying, What manner of man is this, for the winds and the sea obey him?"

Preceded by Matthew 8:25	Gospel of Matthew; Chapter 8	Succeeded by Matthew 8:27
