= Matthew 8:28 =

- ← 8:27 8:29 →
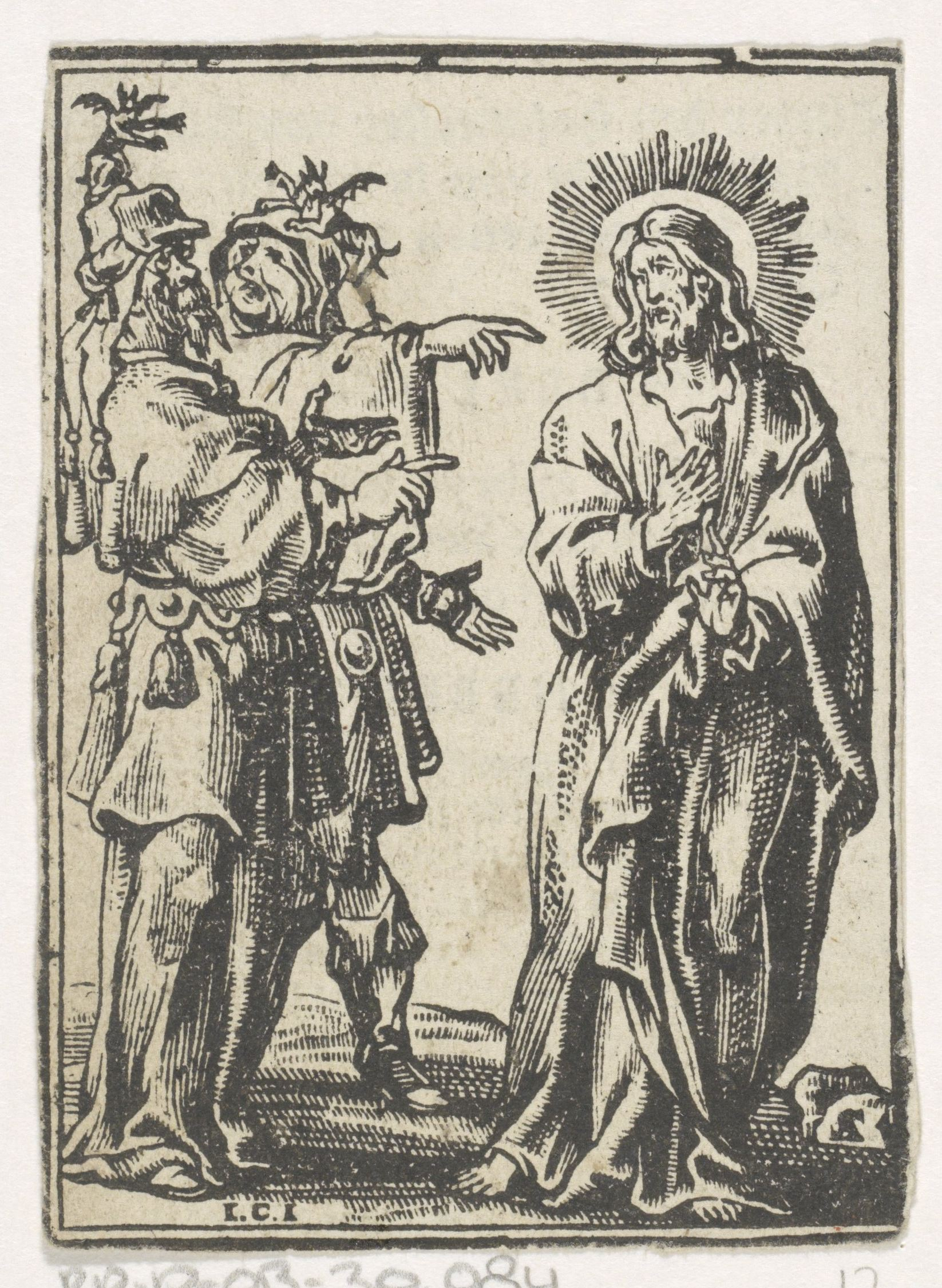
- "Christ heals two possessed men". Antwerpen: Cornelis Woons, 1649
- Book: Gospel of Matthew
- Christian Bible part: New Testament

Matthew 8:28 is the 28th verse in the eighth chapter of the Gospel of Matthew in the New Testament.

== Content ==
In the original Greek according to Westcott-Hort this verse is:

Καὶ ἐλθόντι αὐτῷ εἰς τὸ πέραν εἰς τὴν χώραν τῶν Γεργεσηνῶν, ὑπήντησαν αὐτῷ δύο δαιμονιζόμενοι ἐκ τῶν μνημείων ἐξερχόμενοι, χαλεποὶ λίαν, ὥστε μὴ ἰσχύειν τινὰ παρελθεῖν διὰ τῆς ὁδοῦ ἐκείνης·

In the King James Version of the Bible the text reads:

And when he was come to the other side into the country of the Gergesenes, there met him two possessed with devils, coming out of the tombs, exceeding fierce, so that no man might pass by that way.

The New International Version translates the passage as:

When he arrived at the other side in the region of the Gadarenes, two demon-possessed men coming from the tombs met him. They were so violent that no one could pass that way.

For a collection of other versions see BibleHub Matthew 8:28.

== Analysis ==
In the parallel verses Mark 5:2 and Luke 8:29, only one of the two demoniacs is mentioned. Some postulate that this was because one was much more violent than the other, and so Mark and Luke thought it not worth mentioning the milder of the two.

It was required under the Mosaic law that tombs be built outside towns. John McEvilly believes that the demons compelled the men to dwell in such a place.

== Commentary from the Church Fathers ==
Chrysostom: "Because there were who thought Christ to be a man, therefore the dæmons came to proclaim His divinity, that they who had not seen the sea raging and again still, might hear the dæmons crying; And when he was come to the other side in the country of the Gergesenes, there met him two men having dæmons."

Rabanus Maurus: "Gerasa is a town of Arabia beyond Jordan, close to Mount Gilead, which was in the possession of the tribe of Manasseh, not far from the lake of Tiberias, into which the swine were precipitated."

Preceded by Matthew 8:27	Gospel of Matthew; Chapter 8	Succeeded by Matthew 8:29
