= Matthew 8:25 =

- ← 8:24 8:26 →
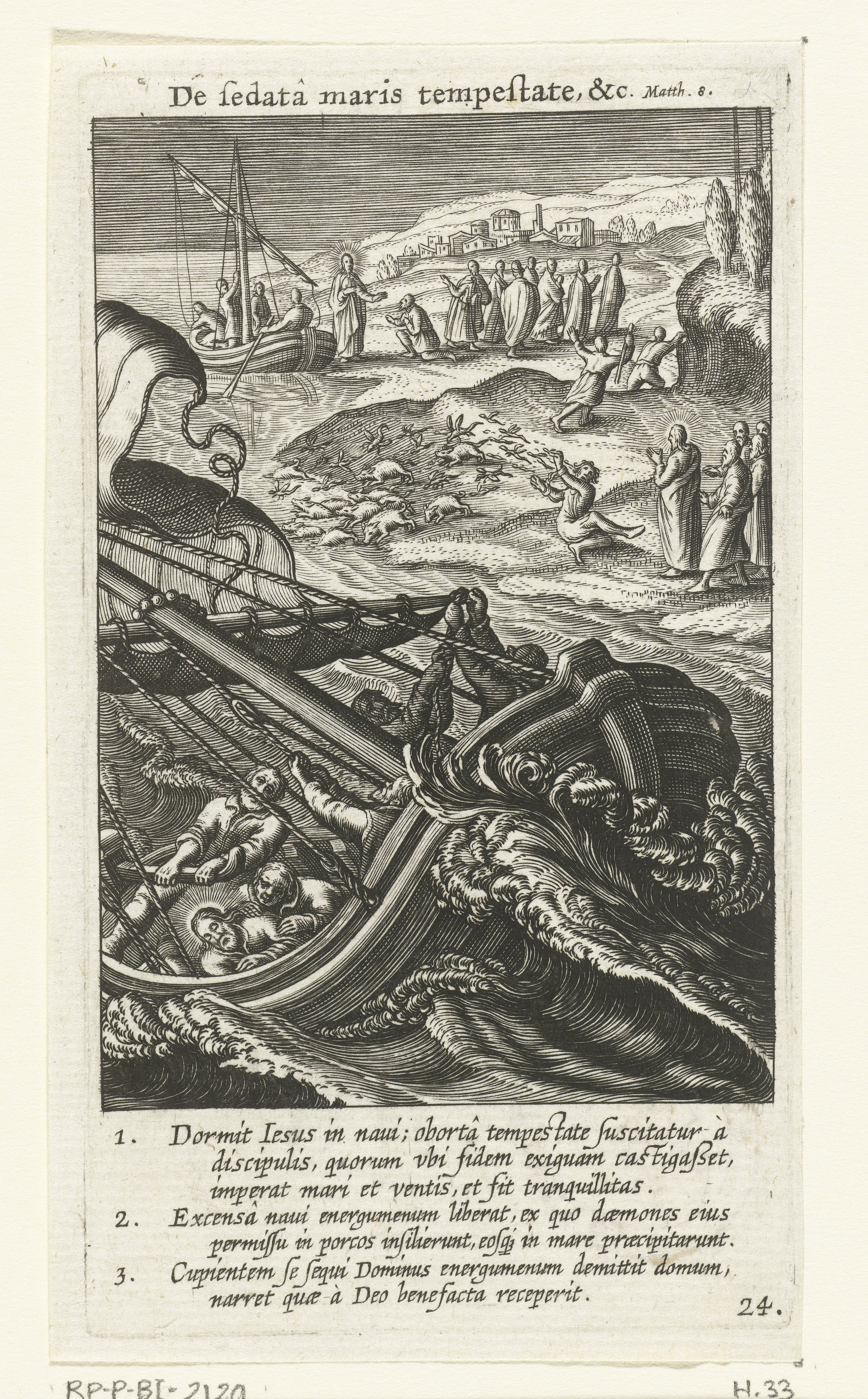
- "Christ slept during the storm on the sea", by Joannes Bourgois, Vitae passionis et mortis Jesu Christi Somini nostri mysteria, Antwerpen Hendrick Aertssens, 1622.
- Book: Gospel of Matthew
- Christian Bible part: New Testament

Matthew 8:25 is a verse in the eighth chapter of the Gospel of Matthew in the New Testament.

== Content ==
In the original Greek according to Westcott-Hort this verse is:

Καὶ προσελθόντες οἱ μαθηταὶ αὐτοῦ ἤγειραν αὐτόν, λέγοντες, Κύριε, σῶσον ἡμᾶς, ἀπολλύμεθα.

In the King James Version of the Bible the text reads:

And his disciples came to him, and awoke him, saying, Lord, save us: we perish.

The New International Version translates the passage as:

The disciples went and woke him, saying, "Lord, save us! We're going to drown!"

For a collection of other versions see BibleHub Matthew 8:25.

== Commentary from the Church Fathers ==
Adamantius (Pseudo-Origen): "Wonderful, stupendous event! He that never slumbereth nor sleepeth, is said to be asleep. He slept with His body, but was awake in His Deity, showing that He bare a truly human body which He had taken on Him, corruptible. He slept with the body that He might cause the Apostles to watch, and that we all should never sleep with our mind. With so great fear were the disciples seized, and almost beside themselves, that they rushed to Him, and did not modestly or gently rouse Him, but violently awakened Him, His disciples came to him, and awoke him, saying, Lord, save us, we perish."

Jerome: "Of this miracle we have a type in Jonah, who while all are in danger is himself unconcerned, sleeps, and is awakened."

Preceded by Matthew 8:24	Gospel of Matthew; Chapter 8	Succeeded by Matthew 8:26
