= Matthew 8:29 =

- ← 8:28 8:30 →
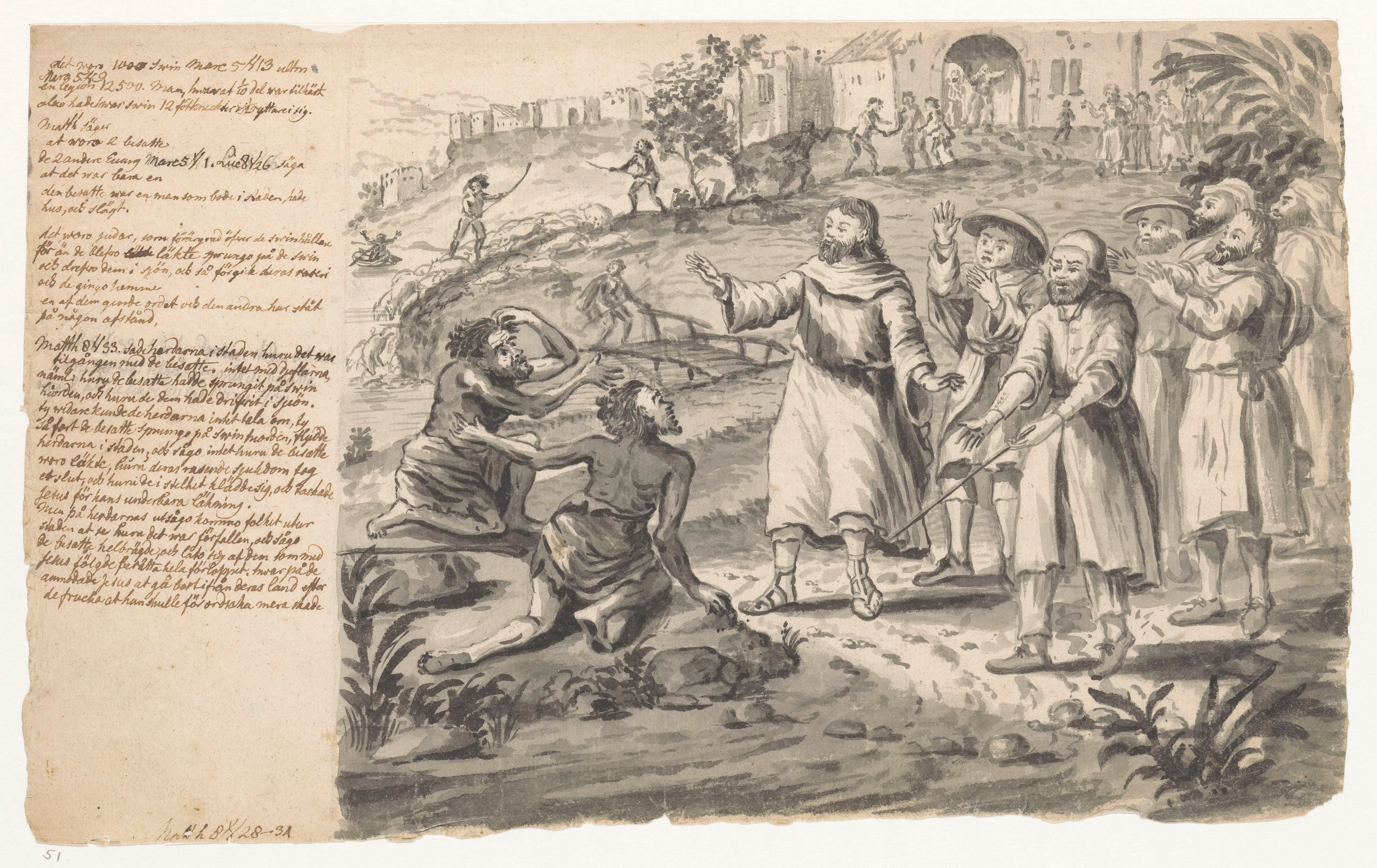
- "Christ heals two possessed men", by Jan Brandes (1788-1808).
- Book: Gospel of Matthew
- Christian Bible part: New Testament

Matthew 8:29 is the 29th verse in the eighth chapter of the Gospel of Matthew in the New Testament.

== Content ==
In the original Greek according to Westcott-Hort this verse is:

καὶ ἰδού, ἔκραξαν λέγοντες, Τί ἡμῖν καὶ σοί, Ἰησοῦ υἱὲ τοῦ Θεοῦ; Ἦλθες ὧδε πρὸ καιροῦ βασανίσαι ἡμᾶς;

In the King James Version of the Bible the text reads:

And, behold, they cried out, saying, What have we to do with thee, Jesus, thou Son of God? art thou come hither to torment us before the time?

The New International Version translates the passage as:

"What do you want with us, Son of God?" they shouted. "Have you come here to torture us before the appointed time?"

For a collection of other versions see BibleHub Matthew 8:29.

== Analysis ==
The initial expression of the demons MacEvilly interprets as, "We only torment sinners. We have nothing to do with Thee, the Son of God, who art infinite sanctity, incapable of sin." MacEvilly also points out that from the expression "Son of God" it appears that the demons knew exactly who Jesus was.

It was believed that some spirits were dragged down to hell before "the appointed time" (See 2 Peter 2 & Jude), which was thought to be Judgement day when they were to be cast into the abyss.

== Commentary from the Church Fathers ==
Augustine: "Whereas Matthew relates that there were two who were afflicted with dæmons, but Mark and Luke mention only one, you must understand that one of them was a person of note, for whom all that country was in grief, and about whose recovery there was much care, whence the fame of this miracle was the more noised abroad."

Jerome: "This is no voluntary confession followed up by a reward to the utterer, but one extorted by the compulsion of necessity. A runaway slave, when after long time he first beholds his master, straight thinks only of deprecating the scourge; so the dæmons, seeing the Lord suddenly moving upon the earth, thought He was come to judge them. Some absurdly suppose, that these dæmons knew the Son of God, while the Devil knew Him not, because their wickedness was less than his. But all the knowledge of the disciple must be supposed in the Master."

Augustine: "God was so far known to them as it was His pleasure to be known; and He pleased to be known so far as it was needful. He was known to them therefore not as He is Life eternal, and the Light which enlightens the good, but by certain temporal effects of His excellence, and signs of His hidden presence, which are visible to angelic spirits though evil, rather than to the infirmity of human nature."

Jerome: "But both the Devil and the dæmons may be said to have rather suspected, than known, Jesus to be the Son of God."

Pseudo-Augustine: "When the dæmons cry out, What have we to do with thee, Jesus, thou Son of God? (1 Cor. 2:8.) we must suppose them to have spoken from suspicion rather than knowledge. For had they known him, they never would have suffered the Lord of glory to be crucified."

Saint Remigius: "But as often as they were tortured by His excellent power, and saw Him working signs and miracles, they supposed Him to be the Son of God; when they saw Him hungry and thirsty, and suffering such things, they doubted, and thought Him mere man. It should be considered that even the unbelieving Jews when they said that Christ cast out dæmons in Beelzebub, and the Arians who said that He was a creature, deserve condemnation not only on God’s sentence, but on the confession of the dæmons, who declare Christ to be the Son of God. Rightly do they say, What have we to do with thee, Jesus, thou Son of God? that is, our malice and Thy grace have nothing in common, according to that the Apostle speaks, There is no fellowship of light with darkness. (2 Cor. 6:14.)"

Chrysostom: "That this should not be thought to be flattery, they cry out what they were experiencing, Art thou come to torment us before the time?"

Augustine: "Either because that came upon them unexpectedly, which they looked for indeed, but supposed more distant; or because they thought their perdition consisted in this, that when known they would be despised; or because this was before the day of judgment, when they should be punished with eternal damnation."

Jerome: "For the presence of the Saviour is the torment of dæmons."

Chrysostom: "They could not say they had not sinned, because Christ had found them doing evil, and marring the workmanship of God; whence they supposed that for their more abundant wickedness the time of the last punishment which shall be at the day of judgment should not be tarried for to punish them."

Preceded by Matthew 8:28	Gospel of Matthew; Chapter 8	Succeeded by Matthew 8:30
