= Jesus eats with sinners and tax-collectors =

Bible story

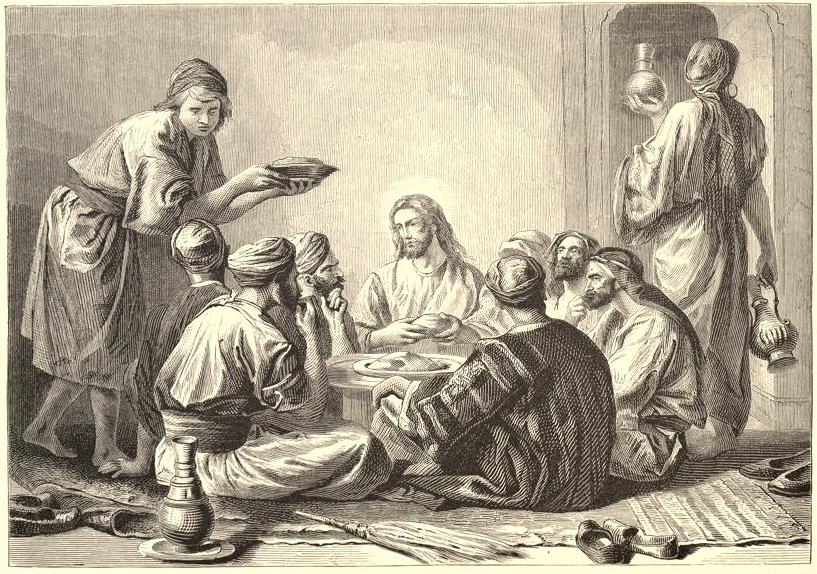
Jesus eats with sinners and publicans by Alexandre Bida

This narrative is told in Matthew 9:10–17, Mark 2:15–22, and Luke 5:29–39. The Pharisees rebuke Jesus for eating with sinners, to which Jesus responds, "It is not the healthy who need a doctor, but the sick."

Jesus shows mercy as opposed to self-righteous judgment. The narrative occurs directly after the Calling of Matthew.

== Narrative ==
While Jesus was having dinner at Matthew’s house, many tax collectors and sinners came and ate with him and his disciples. When the Pharisees saw this, they asked his disciples, “Why does your teacher eat with tax collectors and sinners?”

On hearing this, Jesus said, “It is not the healthy who need a doctor, but the sick. But go and learn what this means: ‘I desire mercy, not sacrifice.’ For I have not come to call the righteous, but sinners.”

— Matthew 9:10–13, New International Version

== Context ==
The tax-collector in the Roman world was an official that was often greedy, and usually took the position from love of money. They would frequently extort unjust dues, especially from the poor. Such tax-collectors were infamous among the Jews. As Cornelius a Lapide points out, the Jews "maintained that they, as a people dedicated to God, ought not to pay tribute to the Romans, who were Gentiles and idolaters: for this was contrary to the liberty and dignity of the children of God."

To associate with tax-collectors and sinners was considered sinful behavior for Jews. Tradition stated: “Let not a man associate with the wicked, not even to bring him to the Torah” (Mechilta).

== Commentary ==
Cornelius a Lapide notes that in this discourse, Jesus must have heard the accusation from his disciples, since evidently the Pharisees were not bold enough to make this charge against Christ directly. Jesus responded to them by comparing himself to a physician, who is not infected by the diseases of the sick, but instead overcomes their illness. So it is not a disgrace, but an honor for a physician to be with the sick. Thus Lapide points out that, Jesus is "a physician of sin-sick souls", and is not contaminated by their sins, but rather heals them.

John McEvilly postulates that the "sinners" referred to in Matthew the Apostle's house, were "either Jews who led loose, dissolute lives, regardless of the law of Moses, and lived after Gentile fashion, and possibly were excommunicated and cast out of the synagogue; or Pagans, who may have been stopping at Capharnaum". McEvilly believes these sinners would likely have come at Matthew's request, or perhaps they were attracted by Jesus' power, and drawn by Matthew's example. Frederick Farrar suggests that "the sinners" refers in general to all "the degraded and outcast classes".

== See also ==
- Life of Jesus in the New Testament
- Ministry of Jesus
- Pharisee and the Publican
- Matthew 9:10
- Matthew 9:11
- Matthew 9:12
