= Buhl, Haut-Rhin =

Commune in Grand Est, France

Buhl
- Commune
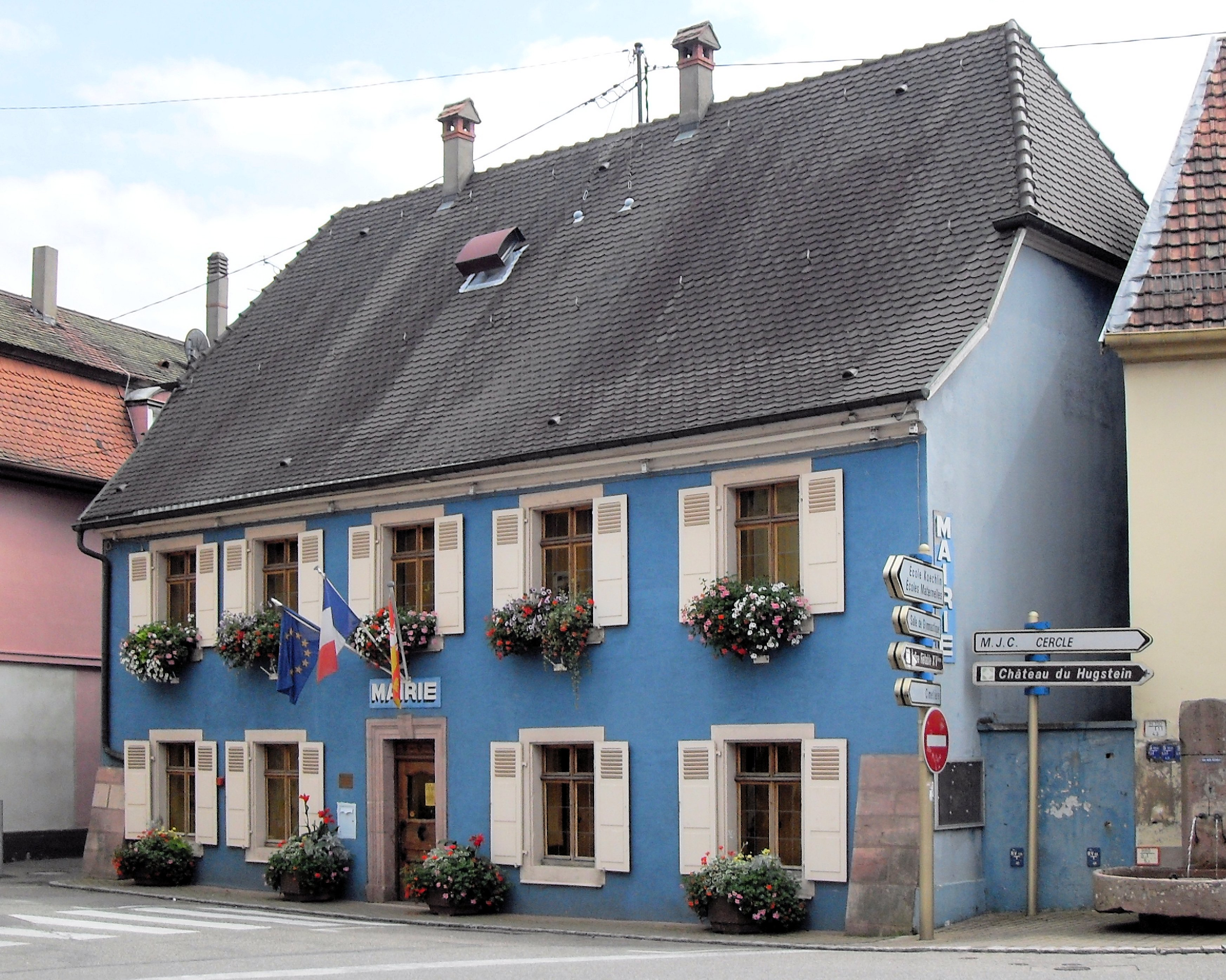
- The town hall in Buhl

- Coat of arms
- Location of Buhl
- Location within France Location within Grand Est
- Coordinates: 47°55′43″N 7°11′14″E
- Country: France
- Region: Grand Est
- Department: Haut-Rhin
- Arrondissement: Thann-Guebwiller
- Canton: Guebwiller
- Intercommunality: Région de Guebwiller

Government
  - Mayor (2020–2026): Yves Coquelle
- Area^{1}: 8.8 km^{2} (3.4 sq mi)
- Elevation: 340 m (1,120 ft)
- Highest elevation: 842 m (2,762 ft)
- Lowest elevation: 313 m (1,027 ft)
- Population (2023): 3,100
  - Density: 350/km^{2} (910/sq mi)
- Time zone: UTC+01:00 (CET)
  - Summer (DST): UTC+02:00 (CEST)
- INSEE/Postal code: 68058 /68530
- ^{1} French Land Register data, which excludes lakes, ponds, glaciers > 1 km^{2} (0.386 sq mi or 247 acres) and river estuaries.

Buhl (French pronunciation: [byl]; German: Bühl) is a commune in the Haut-Rhin department in Grand Est in north-eastern France.

It inhabitants are called Buhlois (male) or Buhloises (female).

== Geography ==
Buhl is situated in the valley of the Lauch, at the foot of the Vosges Mountains and the Grand Ballon (1424 m) and surrounded by forests whose hills reach altitudes ranging from 395 to 860 metres. The village is crossed by the Lauch, a gentle stream with clear, limpid water, in the heart of the Florival valley, 3 km from Guebwiller.

Buhl owes its name to its picturesque site on the Bühele hill, from which the village and church dominate a large part of the valley. The commune covers an area of 880 hectares and extends into two confluent valleys.

The commune is crossed by three water courses, the Lauch, the Murbach and the Krebsbach. Buhl looks over several forested hills which border the village:

- le Demberg (altitude 628 m)
- le Schimerg (582 m) whose steep sides are covered with vines
- le Geisskopf (735 m)
- l'Ebeneck (859 m)
- le Hochkopf (545 m) above the Château du Hugstein

== Population ==
Historical population
Year	Pop.	±% p.a.
1968	2,945	—
1975	3,048	+0.49%
1982	2,674	−1.85%
1990	2,755	+0.37%
1999	3,079	+1.24%
2007	3,238	+0.63%
2012	3,310	+0.44%
2017	3,310	+0.00%
2023	3,100	−1.09%
Source: INSEE

== Sites and monuments ==
=== Église Saint-Jean-Baptiste (Church of St John the Baptist) ===
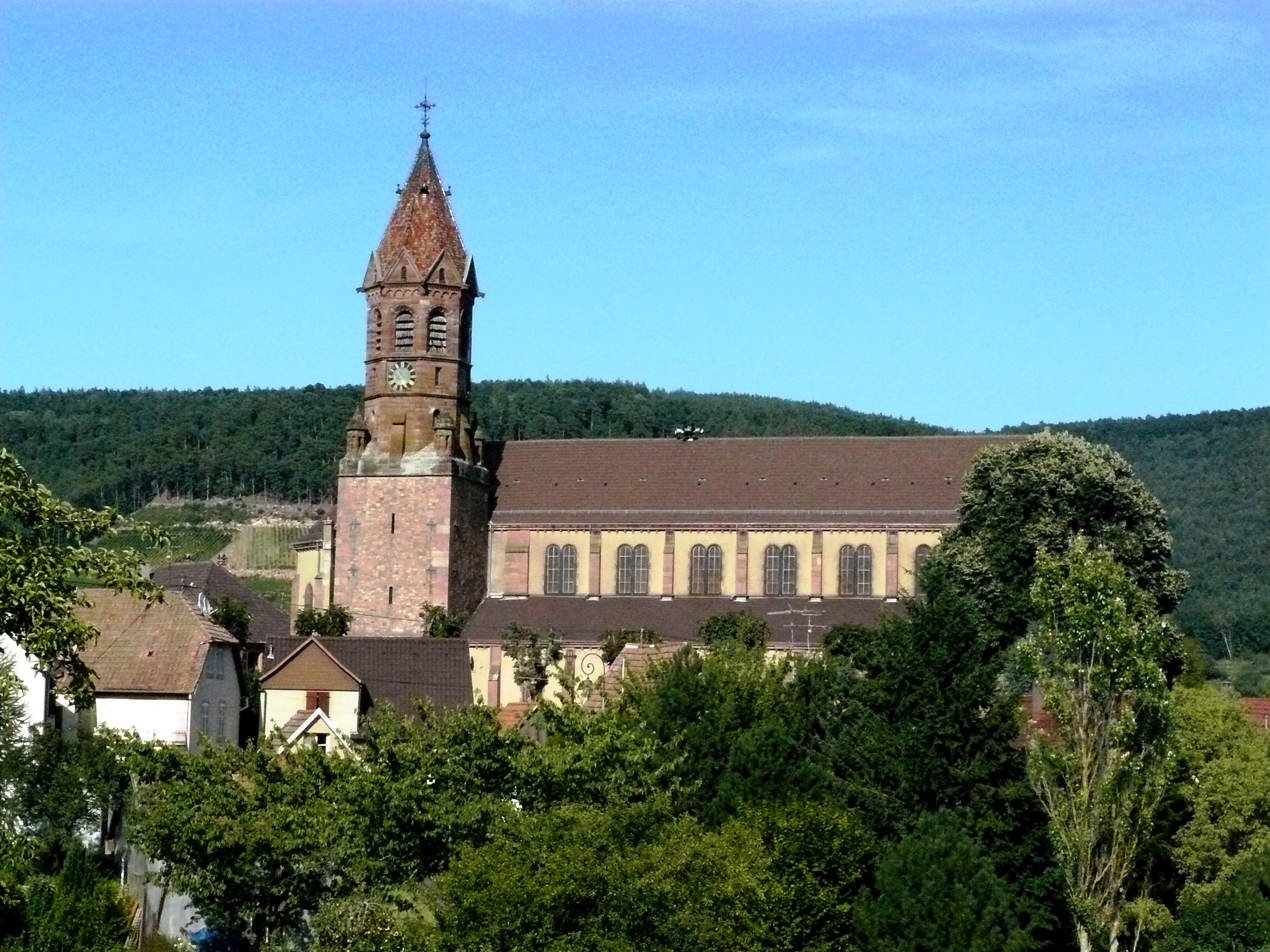
Eglise Sainte Jean Baptiste

The presence of a vicar in Buhl is recorded since 1243.

Of the original 13th-century church, all that remains is the tower, whose two upper levels were remodelled in the 18th century (the date 1748 is visible). The nave and choir were also probably remodelled in the 18th century.

Following a large growth in population in the 19th century, a new church was built to replace the old shrine. With a population of 2000, the municipality had decided that the old church was too small. It was replaced by a vast Neo-Romanesque edifice. Between 1868 and 1870, the architect Langestein built a new nave perpendicular to the old one which served as a choir. The Franco-Prussian War in 1870 interrupted construction, so it was not until 1877 that the remainder of the old church was demolished and a new choir was built by the architect Hartmann.

The top of the original tower was demolished in 1899 amid fears that it could fall. It was replaced with an octagonal bell tower by the architect Kreyer.

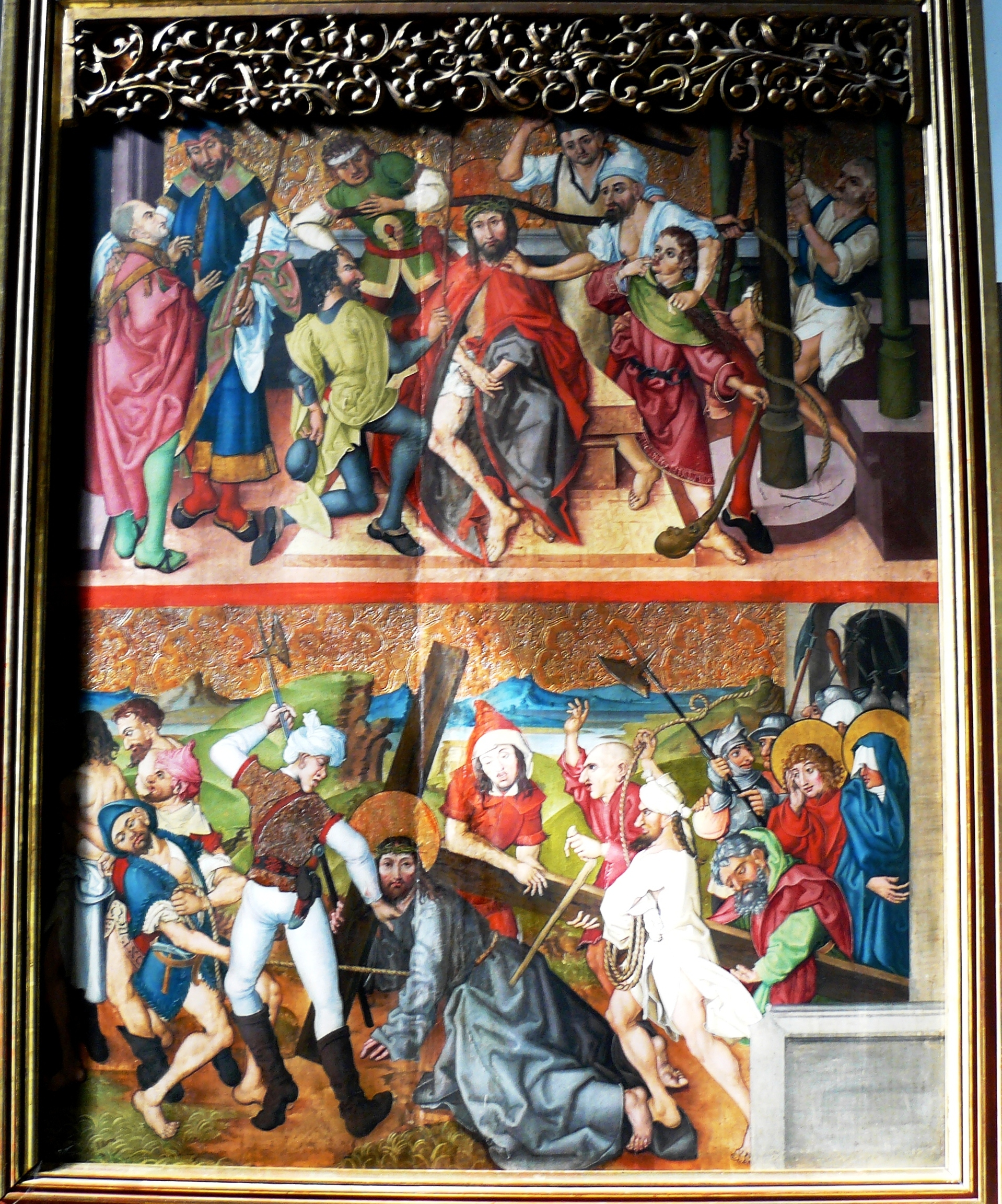
Detail from the Buhl Altarpiece

=== Retable de la Crucifixion ===
The church houses a 15th-century altarpiece consecrated to the Passion of Christ (open shutters) and to the Virgin Mary (closed shutters): the Buhl Altarpiece.

This masterpiece was taken to Colmar during the French Revolution when the convents were emptied of their furniture. After the Revolution, two inhabitants of Buhl brought the altarpiece back to the village hidden in a load of fodder.

The altarpiece probably originated in a Dominican convent, very probably that of the Catherinettes of Colmar. The style of the altarpiece suggests it is from the school of the Colmar artist Martin Schongauer (1448–1491).

From top to bottom, the picture shows the crown and thorns and the carrying of the cross.

=== Château du Hugstein ===
The Château du Hugstein is a ruined 13th-century castle.

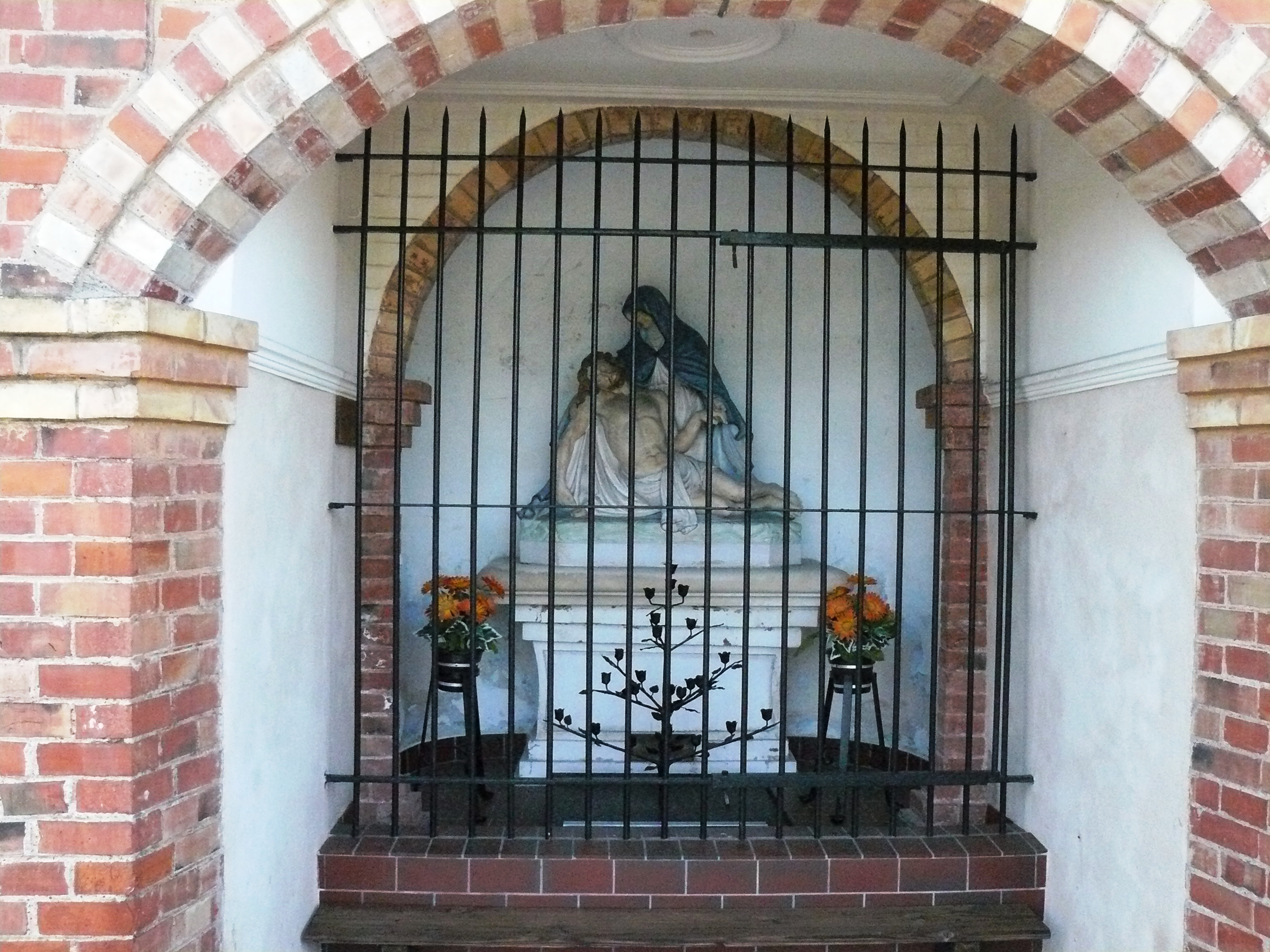
Cemetery chapel

=== Other sites ===
- Chapelle des Maquisards
- Chapelle Notre-Dame
- Calvaire du Rimlishof
- Chapelle du cimetière
- Chapelle Sainte Catherine
- Menhirs de l'Appenthal

== Personalities linked to the commune ==
- Alexandre Bida: 19th-century painter, died in Buhl.
- Jean-Marie Haessle (1939-2024) painter, born and raised in Buhl
- Maurice Koechlin: structural engineer, designer of Eiffel Tower, born in Buhl

== See also ==
- Communes of the Haut-Rhin department
