= Buhl Altarpiece =

Church artwork in Buhl, France

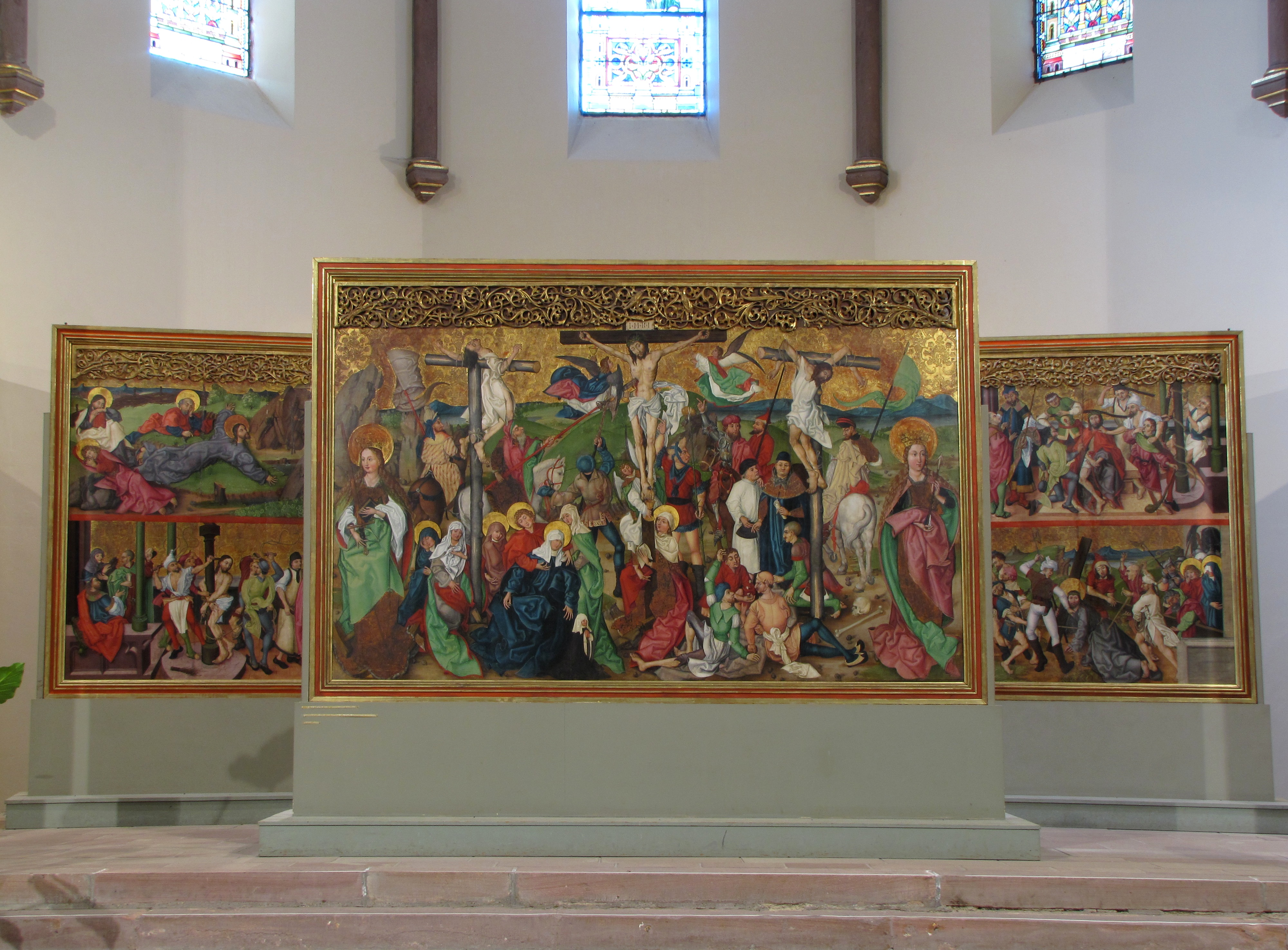
- Artist: Followers of Martin Schongauer
- Year: circa 1495−1500
- Medium: Oil on panel
- Dimensions: 197 cm × 700 cm (78 in × 280 in)
- Location: Église Saint-Jean-Baptiste, Buhl, Haut-Rhin

The Buhl Altarpiece (French: Retable de Buhl) is a late 15th-century, Gothic altarpiece of colossal dimensions now kept in the parish church Église Saint-Jean-Baptiste of Buhl in the Haut-Rhin département of France. It was painted by followers of Martin Schongauer, most probably for the convent of the Dominican sisters of Saint Catherine of Colmar, and moved to its present location in the early 19th century. It is classified as a Monument historique by the French Ministry of Culture (see below, History).

The altarpiece depicts five scenes from the Passion of Jesus, four scenes from the Life of the Virgin, and a Last Judgment.

== History ==
The Couvent Sainte-Catherine de Colmar, the convent of the Dominican sisters of Saint Catherine (French: Catherinettes) of Colmar was established in 1310. The convent's church for which the Buhl altarpiece was originally painted was completed in 1436, replacing a smaller building from 1371. The Gothic building was desecrated in 1792 and partly destroyed in the 19th century. Classified as a Monument historique since 1903, it is now used for different purposes by the municipality.

The colourful Buhl altarpiece is the work of a group of followers of Martin Schongauer, who drew their inspiration both from his woodcuts and from his paintings, especially the Altarpiece of the Dominicans, painted in 1480 for the church of the Dominican friars of Colmar and today kept in the Unterlinden Museum of the same town. The Buhl painters closely followed their model's designs, but on a larger scale and in a simpler and technically cruder manner. While it is not documented that the altarpiece was commissioned by the convent of Saint Catherine, the closeness to the designs of Schongauer but also, to a lesser degree, of Caspar Isenmann (the panel depicting the Flagellation of Christ is reminding of the same scene in the altarpiece of St Martin's Church) indicate without a doubt that it has been painted in Colmar; furthermore, both Saint Catherine and Saint Ursula, who figure prominently in the Crucifixion scene, were particularly venerated by the Dominican sisters of Saint Catherine.

It has been suggested that Schongauer's pupil Urbain Huter (1471–1501) may have been one of the authors but without any solid evidence.

The altarpiece is recorded in Buhl since 1835. The current parish church, a Neo-Romanesque building with a long and imposing nave and a short and narrow choir (in which the altarpiece is displayed) was built in three phases between 1868 and 1899. The altarpiece left Buhl twice, once during World War II, when it was hidden in Périgueux and once from 1966 until 1971, when it was restored in Paris, then displayed in the Unterlinden Museum in Colmar. A local association of the "Friends of the Buhl Altarpiece" (Amis du retable de Buhl) was founded in 1988.

The altarpiece is classified as a Monument historique by the French Ministry of Culture on terms that may appear confusing. It is classified as an object (mobilier) since 1978 according to the digital database of the Ministry, or since 1967 according to the Inventaire général du patrimoine culturel (General inventory of the cultural heritage) of the Ministry. It is also classified since 1863 as a part of the building (immeuble) in which it is displayed, regardless of the fact that the church in question has been entirely rebuilt after that date.

== Description ==
Originally a triptych but currently not displayed in that fashion because of a lack of space, the Buhl altarpiece is composed of a central panel, 3.5 m (11 ft) wide and 1.97 m (6 ft 6 in) high, and two lateral panels, 1.75 m (5 ft 9 in) wide and 1.97 m (6 ft 6 in) high. When opened, the altarpiece thus reaches a width of 7 m (23 ft), significantly surpassing the Isenheim Altarpiece (total width 4.57 m (15.0 ft), and the Ghent Altarpiece (total width 5.20 m (17.1 ft).

The front side of the left wing shows the Agony in the Garden and the Flagellation of Christ. The front side of the central wing represents the Crucifixion of Jesus with Saint Catherine and Saint Ursula. These two female figures may have been painted last as they are in a more distinctly Proto-Renaissance style than the rest. The front side of the right wing represents the Crowning with thorns and the Bearing of the Cross, all from the Passion of Jesus.

The rear side of the left wing shows the Nativity of Jesus and the Assumption of Mary. The rear of the central panel (painted in a different style and in a lesser state of preservation than the rest of the altarpiece) shows the Last Judgment as a doom. The rear of the right panel shows the Annunciation with the Unicorn (almost a carbon copy of the same scene from the Altarpiece of the Dominicans) and the Adoration of the Magi. Remarkably, both the blessed in the depiction of Paradise and the damned in the depiction of Hell in the Last Judgement are almost all clerical people: popes, bishops, monks, nuns. A nun deep in the fire is shown pointing her finger at her tongue; a text (in German) running next to her says "I didn't keep my mouth shut, that's why I'm deep in hell" (Darum, dass ich nit han geswiegen ich tief in der Helle liegen).

== Gallery ==
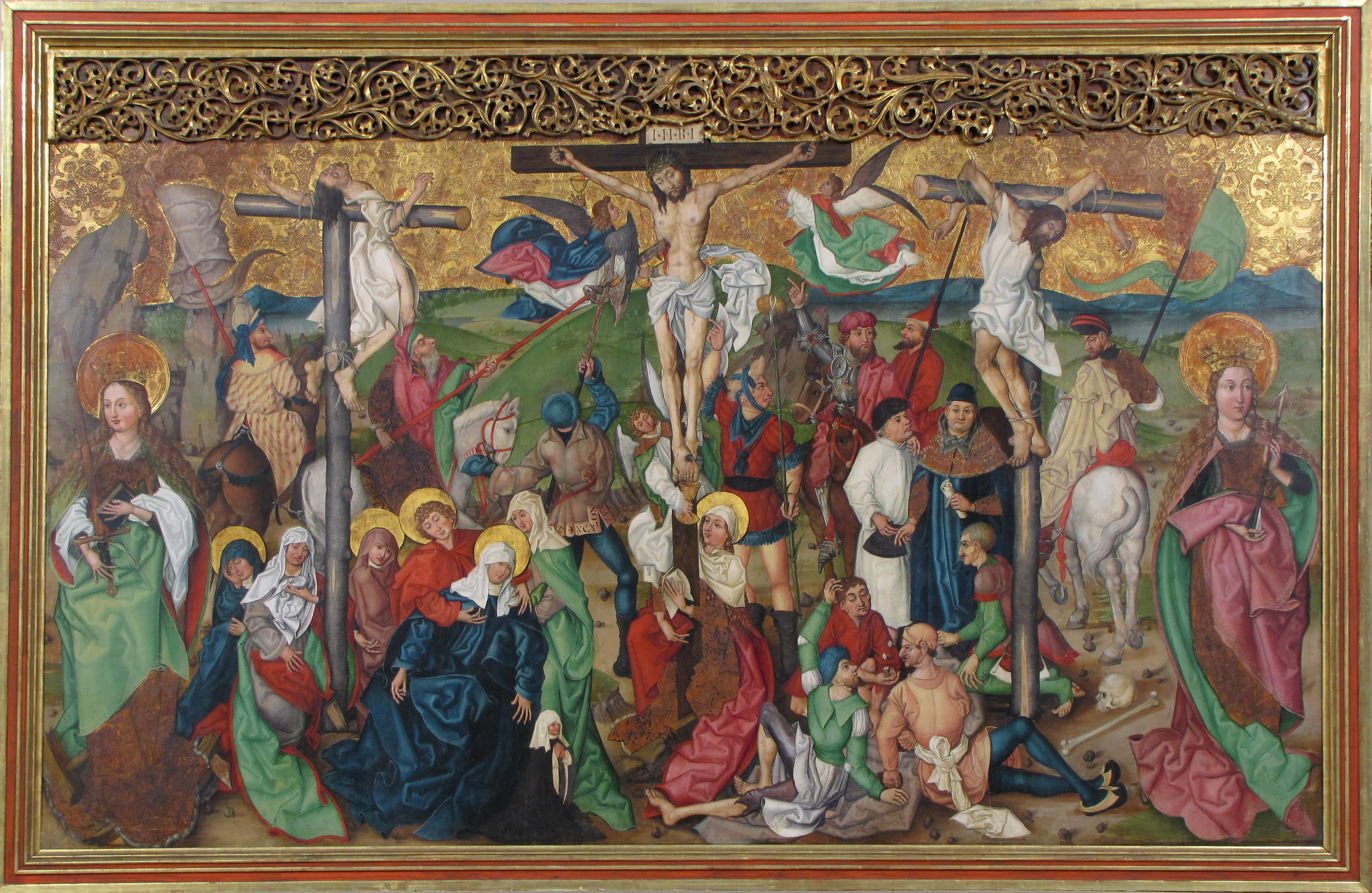
Crucifixion of Jesus

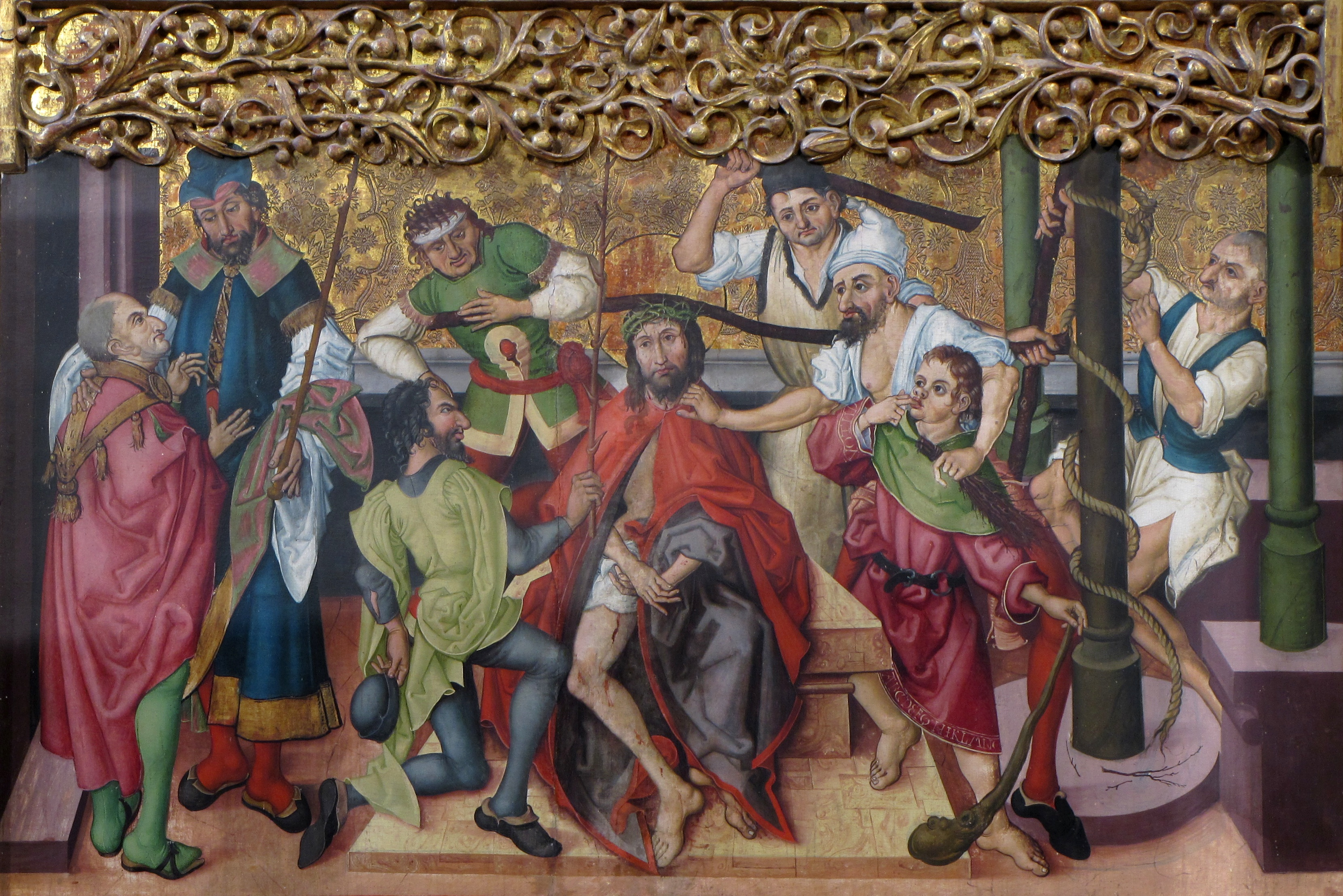
Crown of thorns

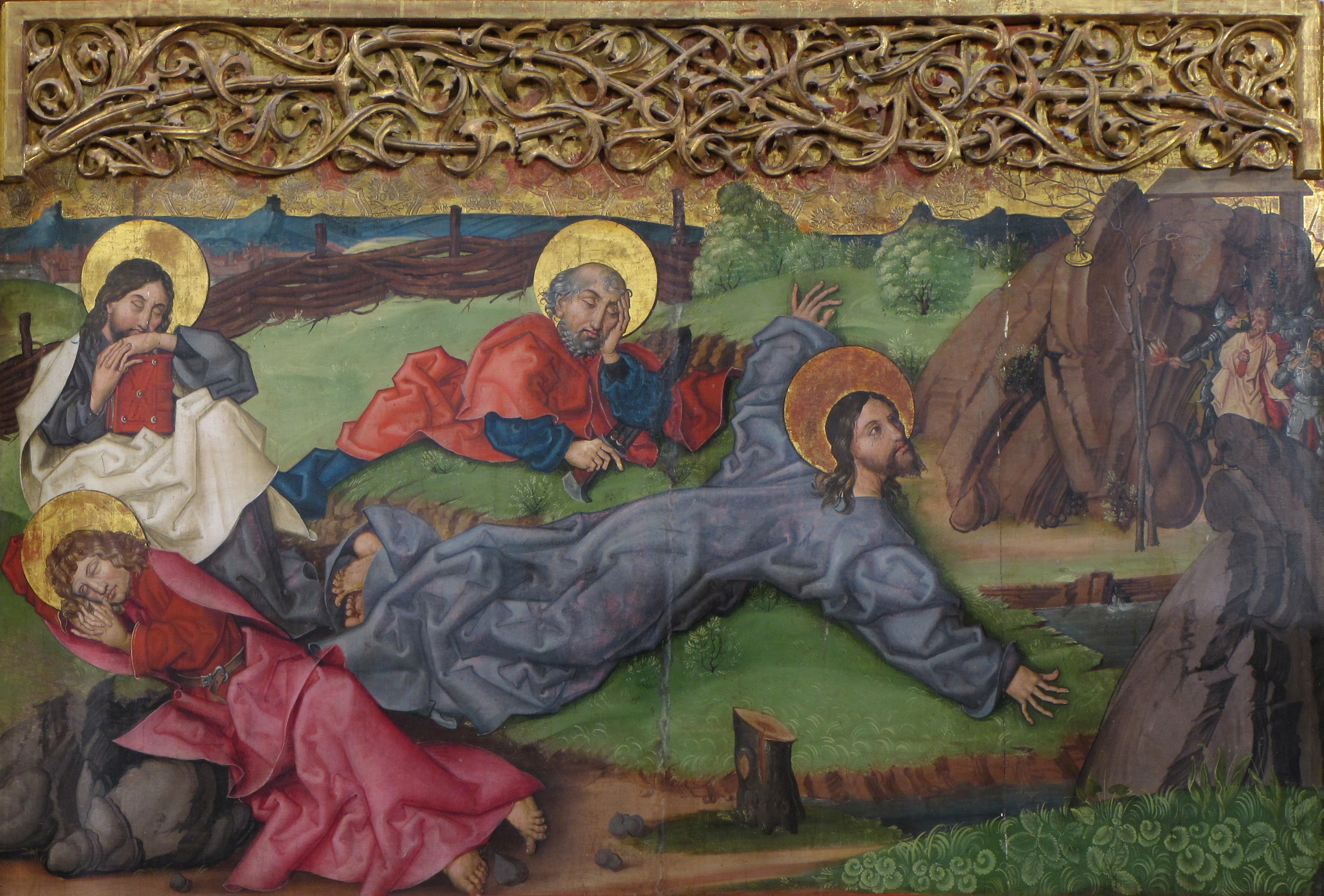
Agony in the Garden

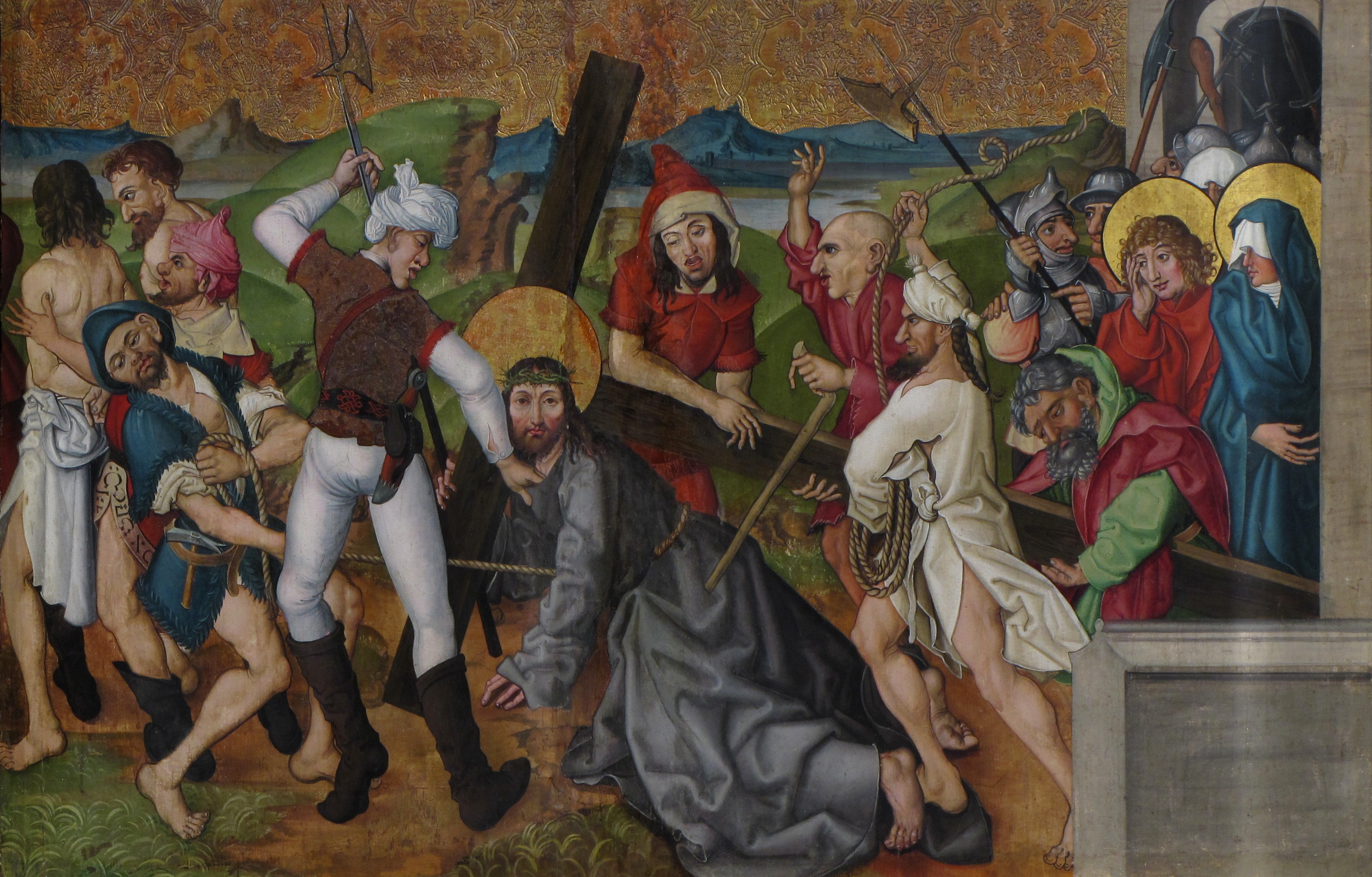
Bearing the Cross

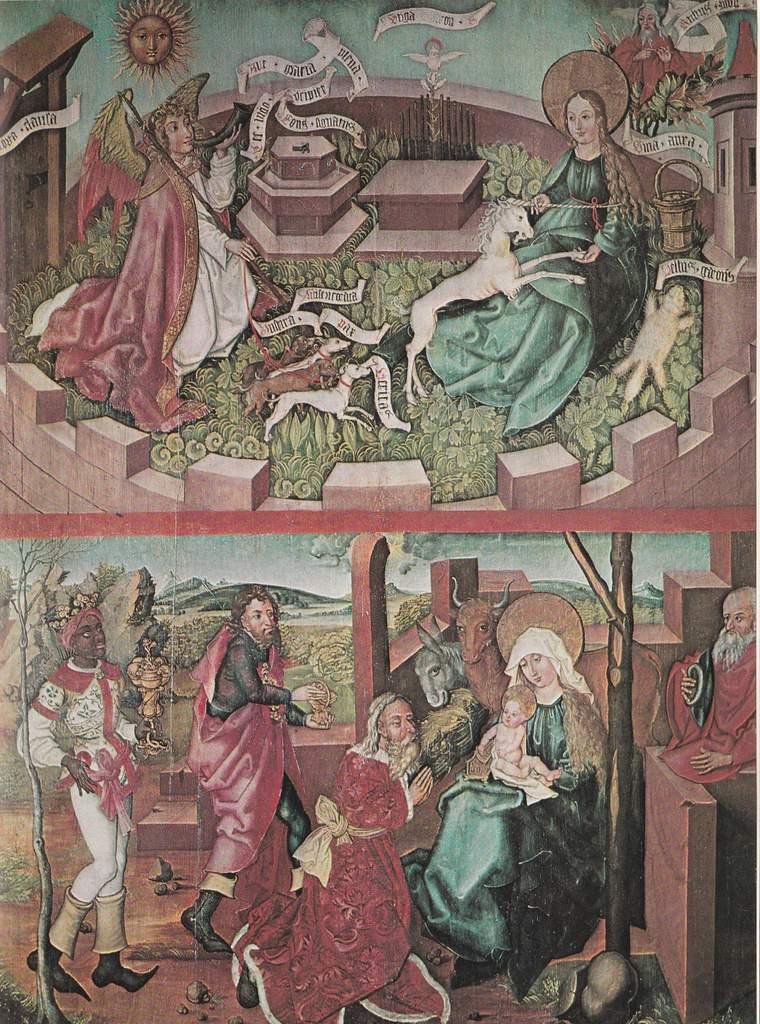
Annunciation with the unicorn and Adoration of the Magi

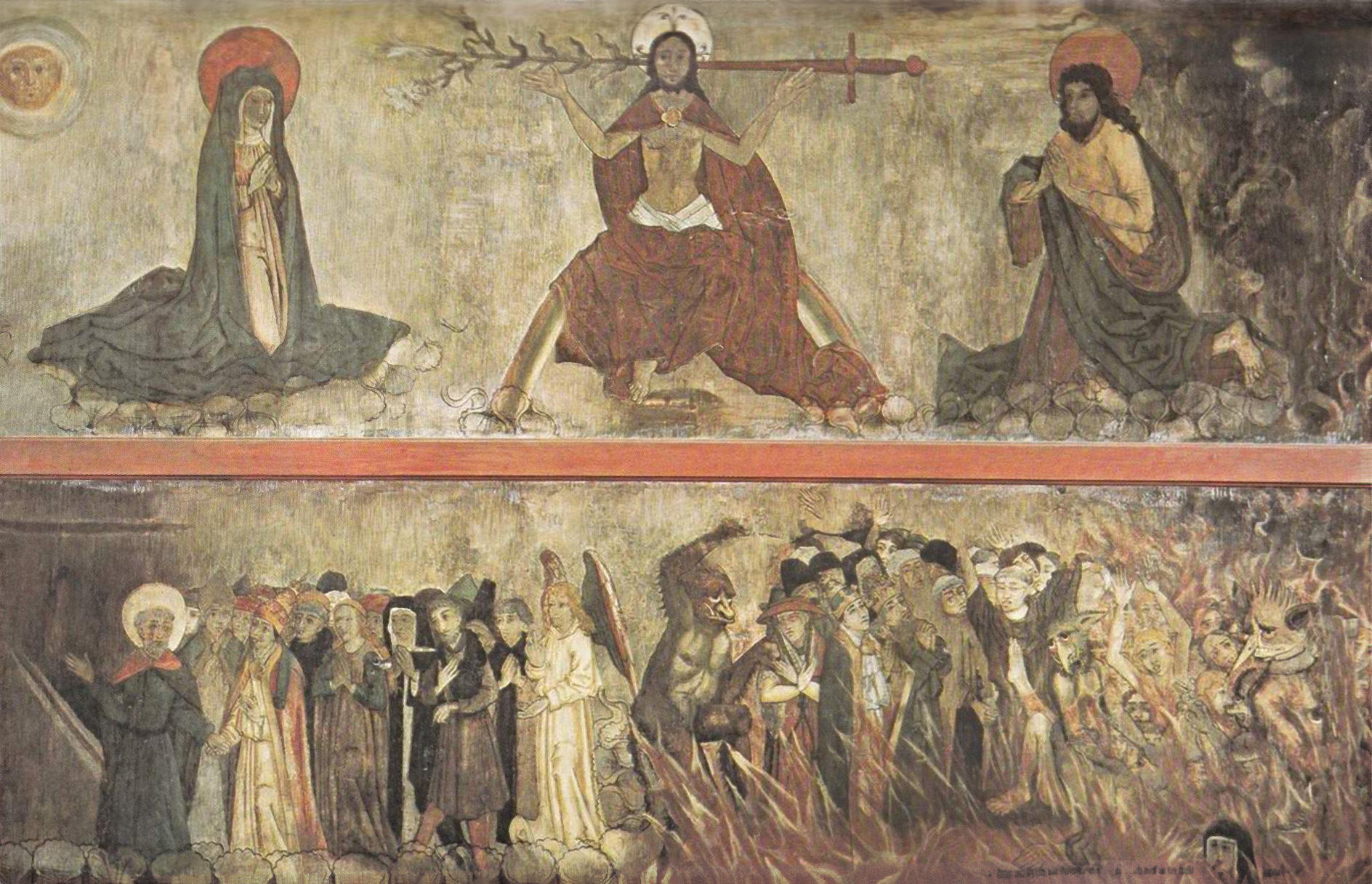
Last Judgment and Hell

== See also ==
- The Passion of Christ (Strasbourg), a contemporary work, also displayed in a church.
