= Matthew 9:15 =

- ← 9:14 9:16 →
- Book: Gospel of Matthew
- Christian Bible part: New Testament

Matthew 9:15 is a verse in the ninth chapter of the Gospel of Matthew in the New Testament.

== Content ==
In the original Greek according to Westcott-Hort this verse is:

Καὶ εἶπεν αὐτοῖς ὁ Ἰησοῦς, Μὴ δύνανται οἱ υἱοὶ τοῦ νυμφῶνος πενθεῖν, ἐφ᾿ ὅσον μετ᾿ αὐτῶν ἐστιν ὁ νυμφίος; Ἐλεύσονται δὲ ἡμέραι ὅταν ἀπαρθῇ ἀπ᾿ αὐτῶν ὁ νυμφίος, καὶ τότε νηστεύσουσιν.

In the King James Version of the Bible the text reads:

And Jesus said unto them, Can the children of the bridechamber mourn, as long as the bridegroom is with them? but the days will come, when the bridegroom shall be taken from them, and then shall they fast.

The New International Version translates the passage as:

Jesus answered, "How can the guests of the bridegroom mourn while he is with them? The time will come when the bridegroom will be taken from them; then they will fast.

== Analysis ==
Most commentators agree that "the Bridegroom" is Christ, since He has become "wedded to human nature." The completion of his marriage is spoken of in Rev 19:7, with "the endless marriage-feast of the Lamb." The word "mourn" is said to mean "fast" by Lapide. The sense he gives is that, "at a wedding, modest banquets are becoming, fasting is unbecoming." However, when Christ dies then his disciples will mourn and fast. By this MacEvilly believes he referring to the ancient custom of mourning for the dead, with fasting, which David and the Hebrews did for seven days when Saul died. Lapide points out that the Apostles did stricter fasting after Jesus died, which St. Paul relates in 1 Cor 11. In the Orthodox church, Christians continue to fast, observing Wednesdays and Fridays as fast days, while Western churches join them to observe Lent as a fasting time.

== Commentary from the Church Fathers ==
Jerome: " Christ is the Bridegroom and the Church the Bride. Of this spiritual union the Apostles were born; they cannot mourn so long as they see the Bridegroom in the chamber with the Bride. But when the nuptials are past, and the time of passion and resurrection is come, then shall the children of the Bridegroom fast. The days shall come when the bridegroom shall be taken from them, and then shall they fast."

Chrysostom: " He means this; The present is a time of joy and rejoicing; sorrow is therefore not to be now brought forward; and fasting is naturally grievous, and to all those that are yet weak; for to those that seek to contemplate wisdom, it is pleasant; He therefore speaks here according to the former opinion. He also shows that this they did was not of gluttony, but of a certain dispensation."

Jerome: " Hence some think that a fast ought to follow the forty days of Passion, although the day of Pentecost and the coming of the Holy Spirit immediately bring back our joy and festival. From this text accordingly, Montanus, Prisca, and Maximilla enjoin a forty days’ abstinence after Pentecost, but it is the use of the Church to come to the Lord’s passion and resurrection through humiliation of the flesh, that by carnal abstinence we may better be prepared for spiritual fulness."

Preceded by Matthew 9:14	Gospel of Matthew; Chapter 9	Succeeded by Matthew 9:16
