= Matthew 9:16 =

- ← 9:15 9:17 →
- Book: Gospel of Matthew
- Christian Bible part: New Testament

Matthew 9:16 is a verse in the ninth chapter of the Gospel of Matthew in the New Testament.

== Content ==
In the original Greek according to Westcott-Hort this verse is:

Οὐδεὶς δὲ ἐπιβάλλει ἐπίβλημα ῥάκους ἀγνάφου ἐπὶ ἱματίῳ παλαιῷ· αἴρει γὰρ τὸ πλήρωμα αὐτοῦ ἀπὸ τοῦ ἱματίου, καὶ χεῖρον σχίσμα γίνεται.

In the King James Version of the Bible the text reads:

No man putteth a piece of new cloth unto an old garment, for that which is put in to fill it up taketh from the garment, and the rent is made worse.

The New International Version translates the passage as:

"No one sews a patch of unshrunk cloth on an old garment, for the patch will pull away from the garment, making the tear worse.

== Analysis ==
Lapide conjectures that the parable means: "If an ancient garment be torn, it should be mended with the like old cloth, not with new. For if the new patch be sewed on to the old cloth, the garment is no longer whole and homogeneous, but multiform and heterogeneous, and so deformed and spoilt." So, therefore, the rent is made worse. MacEvilly further points out that parable connects to the verse before, that Christ does not enjoin strict fasting on his new disciples, preferring rather they do so of their own free will out of love for him, which they do later (see Acts 13:2, 3; 2 Cor. 11:27; Acts 27:9). In general, the church fathers seem to equate the old skins with the Old Law, and the new patch with the New Law (the Gospel).

== Commentary from the Church Fathers ==
Chrysostom: "Here again He confirms what He has said by examples of common things; No man putteth a patch of undressed cloth into an old garment; for it taketh away its wholeness from, the garment, and the rent is made worse; which is to say, My disciples are not yet become strong, but have need of much consideration; they are not yet renewed by the Spirit. On men in such a state it is not behoveful to lay a burden of precepts. Herein He establishes a rule for His disciples, that they should receive with leniency disciples from out of the whole world."

Saint Remigius: "By the old garment He means His disciples, who had not yet been renewed in all things. The patch of undressed, that is, of new cloth, means the new grace, that is, the Gospel doctrine, of which fasting is a portion; and it was not meet that the stricter ordinances of fasting should be entrusted to them, lest they should be broken down by their severity, and forfeit that faith which they had; as He adds, It taketh its wholeness from the garment, and the rent is made worse."

Glossa Ordinaria: "As much as to say, An undressed patch, that is, a new one, ought not to be put into an old garment, because it often takes away from the garment its wholeness, that is, its perfection, and then the rent is made worse. For a heavy burden laid on one that is untrained often destroys that good which was in him before."

Preceded by Matthew 9:15	Gospel of Matthew; Chapter 9	Succeeded by Matthew 9:17
