= Matthew 9:14 =

- ← 9:13 9:15 →
- Book: Gospel of Matthew
- Christian Bible part: New Testament

Matthew 9:14 is a verse in the ninth chapter of the Gospel of Matthew in the New Testament.

== Content ==
In the original Greek according to Westcott-Hort this verse is:

Τότε προσέρχονται αὐτῷ οἱ μαθηταὶ Ἰωάννου, λέγοντες, Διὰ τί ἡμεῖς καὶ οἱ Φαρισαῖοι νηστεύομεν πολλά, οἱ δὲ μαθηταί σου οὐ νηστεύουσι;

In the King James Version of the Bible the text reads:

Then came to him the disciples of John, saying, Why do we and the Pharisees fast oft, but thy disciples fast not?

The New International Version translates the passage as:

Then John's disciples came and asked him, "How is it that we and the Pharisees fast, but your disciples do not fast?"

== Analysis ==
Here it appears that the Scribes and Pharisees induce John's disciples to bring a charge against Christ and his disciples from the common fasting they both practiced. The parallel verse in Luke 5:33 seems to indicate that although the disciples and Christ kept the normal Jewish fasts they did not go beyond to anything stricter. According to MacEvilly they appear to be saying, "why do you profess yourself to be a master of perfection and yet we fast more than you." Lapide postulates that perhaps the disciples of John said these things out of zeal for their master, and envy of Christ, preferring John to Him.

== Commentary from the Church Fathers ==
Glossa Ordinaria: " When He had replied to them respecting eating and converse with sinners, they next assault Him on the matter of food; Then came to him the disciples of John, saying, Why do we and the Pharisees fast often, but thy disciples fast not?"

Jerome: " O boastful enquiry and ostentation of fasting much to be blamed, nor can John’s disciples be excused for their taking part with the Pharisees who they knew had been condemned by John, and for bringing a false accusation against Him whom they knew their master had preached."

Chrysostom: " What they say comes to this, Be it that you do this as Physician of souls, but why do your disciples neglect fasting and approach such tables? And to augment the weight of their charge by comparison, they put themselves first, and then the Pharisees. They fasted as they learnt out of the Law, as the Pharisee spoke, I fast twice in the week; (Luke 18:12.) the others learnt it of John."

Rabanus Maurus: " For John drank neither wine, nor strong drink, increasing his merit by abstinence, because he had no power over nature. But the Lord who has power to forgive sins, why should He shun sinners that eat, since He has power to make them more righteous than those that eat not? Yet doth Christ fast, that you should not avoid the command; but He eats with sinners that you may know His grace and power."

Augustine: " Though Matthew mentions only the disciples of John as having made this enquiry, the words of Mark rather seem to imply that some other persons spoke of others, that is, the guests spoke concerning the disciples of John and the Pharisees—this is still more evident from Luke; why then does Matthew here say, Then came unto him the disciples of John, (Luck 5:33.) unless that they were there among other guests, all of whom with one consent put this objection to Him?"

Chrysostom: " Or; Luke relates that the Pharisees, but Matthew that the disciples of John, said thus, because the Pharisees had taken them with them to ask the question, as they afterwards did the Herodians. Observe how when strangers, as before the Publicans, were to be defended, He accuses heavily those that blamed them; but when they brought a charge against His disciples, He makes answer with mildness. And Jesus saith unto them, Can the children of the bridegroom mourn as long as the bridegroom is with them? Before He had styled Himself Physician, now Bridegroom, calling to mind the words of John which he had said, He that hath the bride is the bridegroom. (John 3:29.)"

Preceded by Matthew 9:13	Gospel of Matthew; Chapter 9	Succeeded by Matthew 9:15
