= Jean-Marie Haessle =

French-American painter (1939–2024)

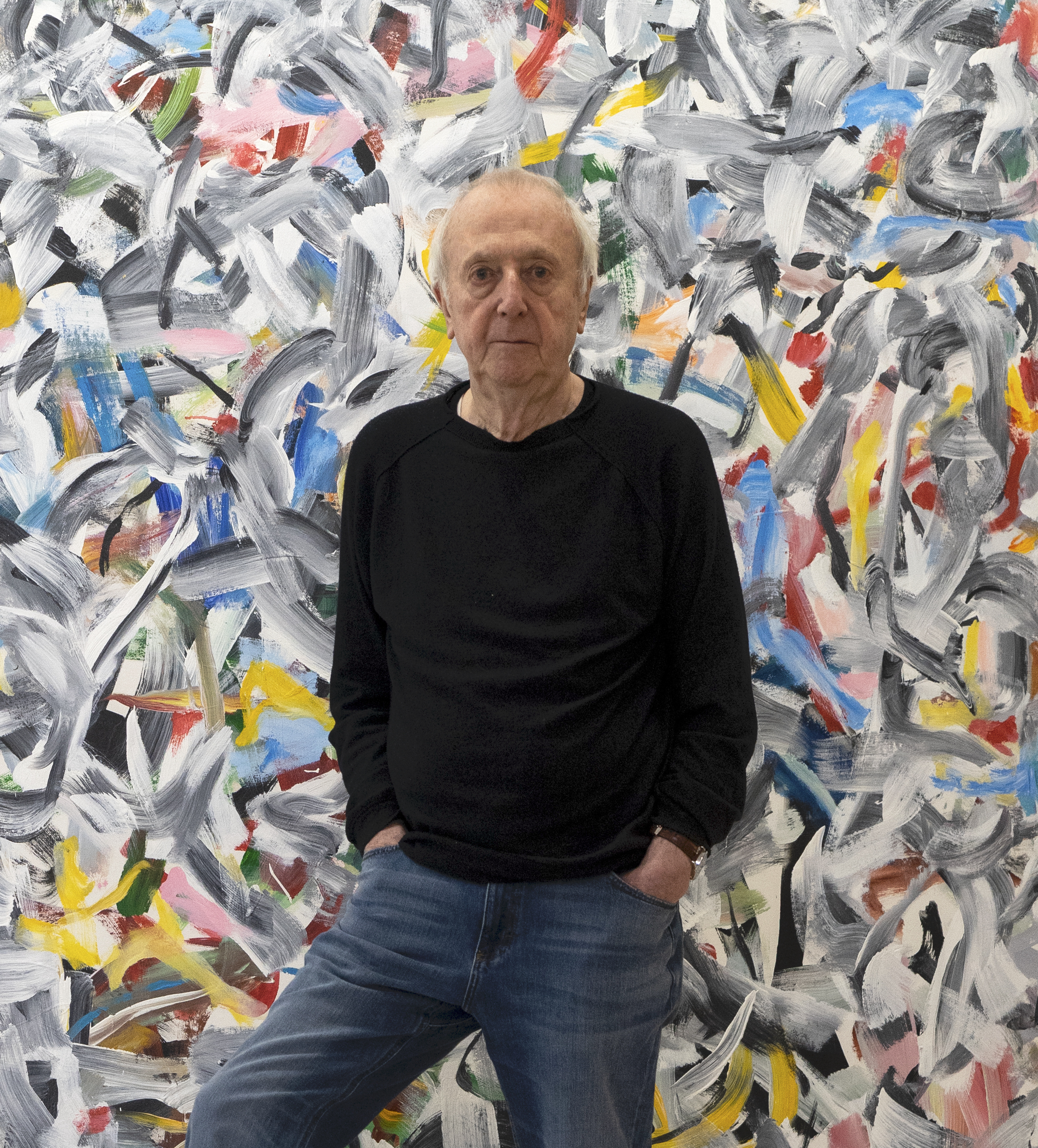
- Haessle in 2022
- Born: 12 September 1939; Buhl, France
- Died: 16 April 2024 (aged 84)
- Known for: Abstraction

Jean-Marie Haessle (12 September 1939 – 16 April 2024) was a French-American painter. He is primarily known for his abstract, geometrical, and impressionist paintings. His work is associated with American Modernism and makes use of Color Field composition.

== Early life ==
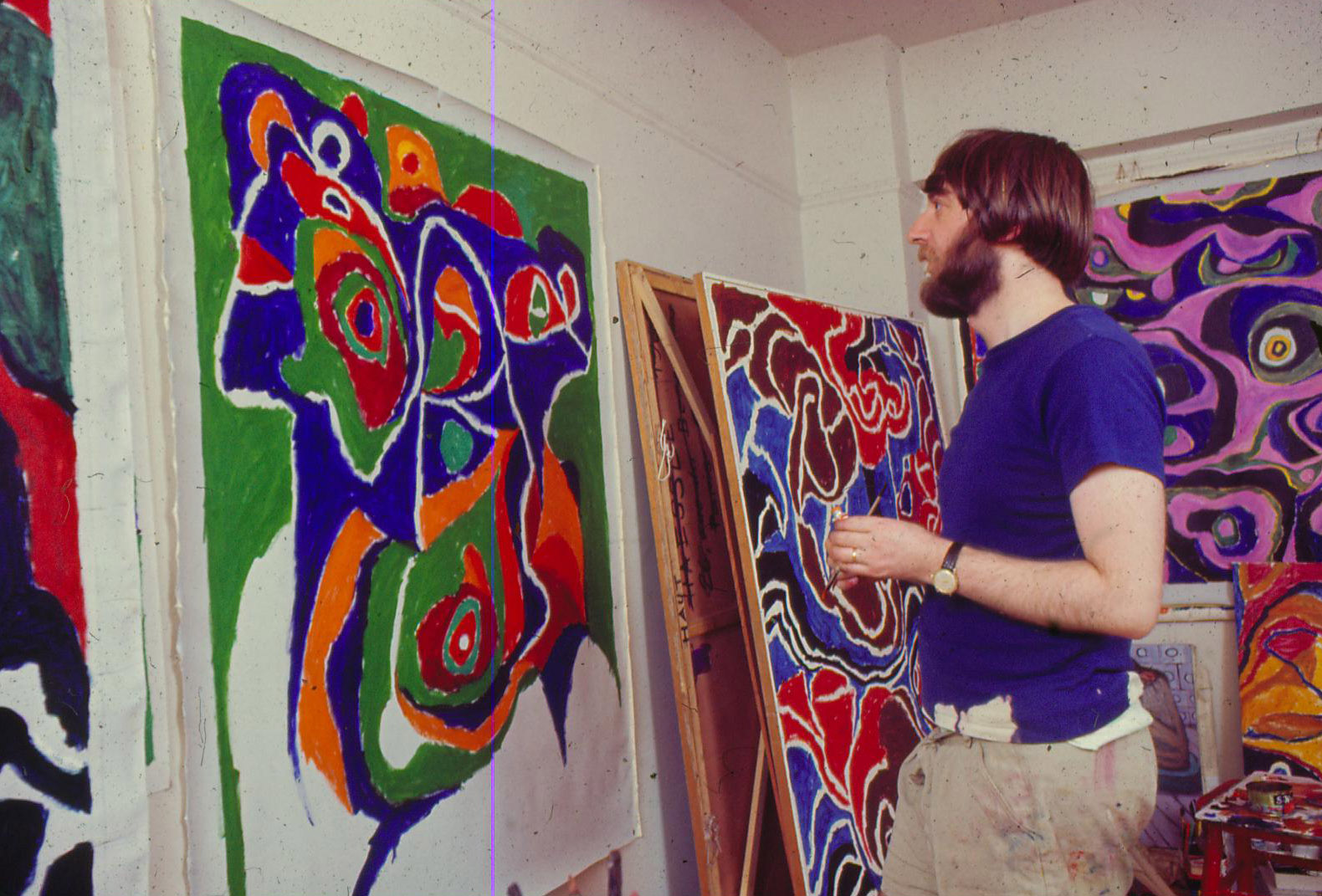
Haessle in his Upper West Side studio, 1967

From Buhl a small village in France, Haessle's exposure to art did not come until later in his adolescence. At the age of fourteen, Haessle worked at a salt mine. pl In 1958, he became very ill and was bedridden at the hospital for six months due to a kidney infection. This was his first introduction to art through reading a book on the Impressionists. While at the hospital, he created many works on paper. After his recovery, he would continuously read, despite the inaccessibility of some books and periodicals in his isolated village. While continuing to work at the mines, a job he hated, he dreamed of becoming an artist and moving to Paris. Before making his way to Paris, he was drafted into the French Army. He spent three years in service, stationed half the time in Germany as a French occupant, and half the time in Algeria. In Munich, Haessle was exposed to art physically when he visited his first art museum. He was inspired by Van Gogh's "Sunflowers." Haessle continued to create work, experimenting with figurative, but also with abstraction.

It was not until 1962 that he finally could move to Paris. In his early 20s, Haessle took up many small jobs including working as an assistant to an architect and a night watchman in a hotel. He lived in a maid's room on the seventh floor of a walkup with no heating but enjoyed the artistic scene in Paris at the time. During the four years that he lived in Paris, he frequented the École des Beaux-Arts.

In 1967, Haessle met an American artist, Lucienne Weinberger, and his curiosity about the world continued to grow. Within two weeks, they started living together. Soon after, the couple married and decided to move to New York. In July 1967, "he arrived in New York with $200 in his pocket" and very minimal spoken English.

They lived on the Upper West Side for a while. Haessle took up various jobs at Columbia Records where he met Tomi Ungerer. He also freelanced at The New York Times before he settled in the pursuit of his career as an artist. He struggled with the art community in New York where he was unable to find a casual place for artists to engage with one another like the community he had in Paris.

In 1970, Haessle and his wife, Lucienne, moved to Westbeth, the recently opened artist-in-residence space. They were among the first people to move into the Artists' Housing in 1970 and considered themselves urban pioneers in an area of vacant warehouses, the abandoned West Side Elevated Highway, and rotting piers. The couple stayed there for three years before moving to SoHo, a loft that he currently still resides in. That same year, the couple separated.

Life in New York during the late 1970s and 1980s was a time of vast change and artistic growth. Haessle experienced in the formation of what became a new way of living and making art in lower Manhattan. In the early 1970s, it was possible to buy a building in the then-rundown area for $500,000. Haessle and a group of artists invested all their savings to purchase one of the last manufacturing buildings in SoHo. Soon after moving in, Haessle and Lucienne separated. Living in lower Manhattan, Haessle met and befriended others artists: Bernar Venet, Arman, Basquiat, Louise Bourgeois which he often met at Fanneli Cafe. Dorothea Tanning and Ron Gorchov, at the time, they lived on Broome Street. His neighbor, Donald Judd occupying an entire building which today is his foundation.

"30 Ans de Peinture," by David Shapiro art historian and poet, published a poem in 1995 dedicated to the artist.

Rebuilding a connection with France, Haessle exchanged apartments with another artist from Lyon. Exposure to the French art market was also mirrored by the growth in sales in New York.

Mizuma & Kips Gallery has represented Haessle at multiple art fairs in the U.S. and Korea.

Haessle later lived in SoHo, Manhattan. He died on 16 April 2024, at the age of 84.

== Selected exhibitions ==
- 2026 Jean-Marie Haesslé “ Paintings 1958 - 2024”, OKNP Busan, Korea
- 2025 Jean-Marie Haesslé “ What Painting Means : Jean-Marie Haessle” ,Sung Kok Art Museum , Seoul, Korea
- 2023 Jean-Marie Haesslé “ New Works”, Mizuma & Kips, NY, USA
- 2023 Jean-Marie Haessle “ SOHO” Gallery 138, Seoul, Korea
- 2022 Jean-Marie Haesslé – “Paris, New York”, Jeonbuk Museum of Art, Korea
- Paintings: Elements, 2021, Mizuma & Kips Gallery, New York, US
- Jean-Marie Haessle Color of Life Homage to Hiroshige, 2018, Wada Garou, Tokyo, Japan
- Jean-Marie Haessle, 2017 “Journey / Homage to Hiroshige” Kodokan, Kyoto, Japan
- Falling into Abstractionism, 2015, Soohoh Gallery, Korea (group show)
- The Color of Life, 2014, Korea University Museum, Seoul, Korea
- NaMu Modern & Contemporary, Seoul, Korea
- Color in Abstraction,Keumsan Gallery, 2013 Seoul, Korea
- 2012 “Multimedia Tour – Haesslé”, Hillwood Art Museum, LIU Post, Long Island City, NY, USA
- 2012 Whitelabs Gallery, Milan, Italy
- 2010 David Richard Contemporary, Santa Fe NM, US
- 2000 Gallery Yvonamor Palix, Mexico DF Mexico
- 1997 École des Beaux Arts de Metz, Metz, France
- 1997 Kunsthaus Santa Fe, San Miguel de Allende, Mexico
- 1997 Museo de Art, Querétaro, Mexico
- 1995 Kim Foster Gallery, New York NY US
- 1995 Center Europeen d'actions Artistiques Contemporaines, Strasbourg France
- 1994 Chateau du Grand Jardin, Joinville France
- 1989 Galerie Jade, Colmar France
- 1988 Galerie Lucien Durand, Paris France
- 1972 Westbeth Gallery, New York NY US
- 1968 Panoras Gallery, New York NY US
