= Matthew 9:18 =

- ← 9:17 9:19 →
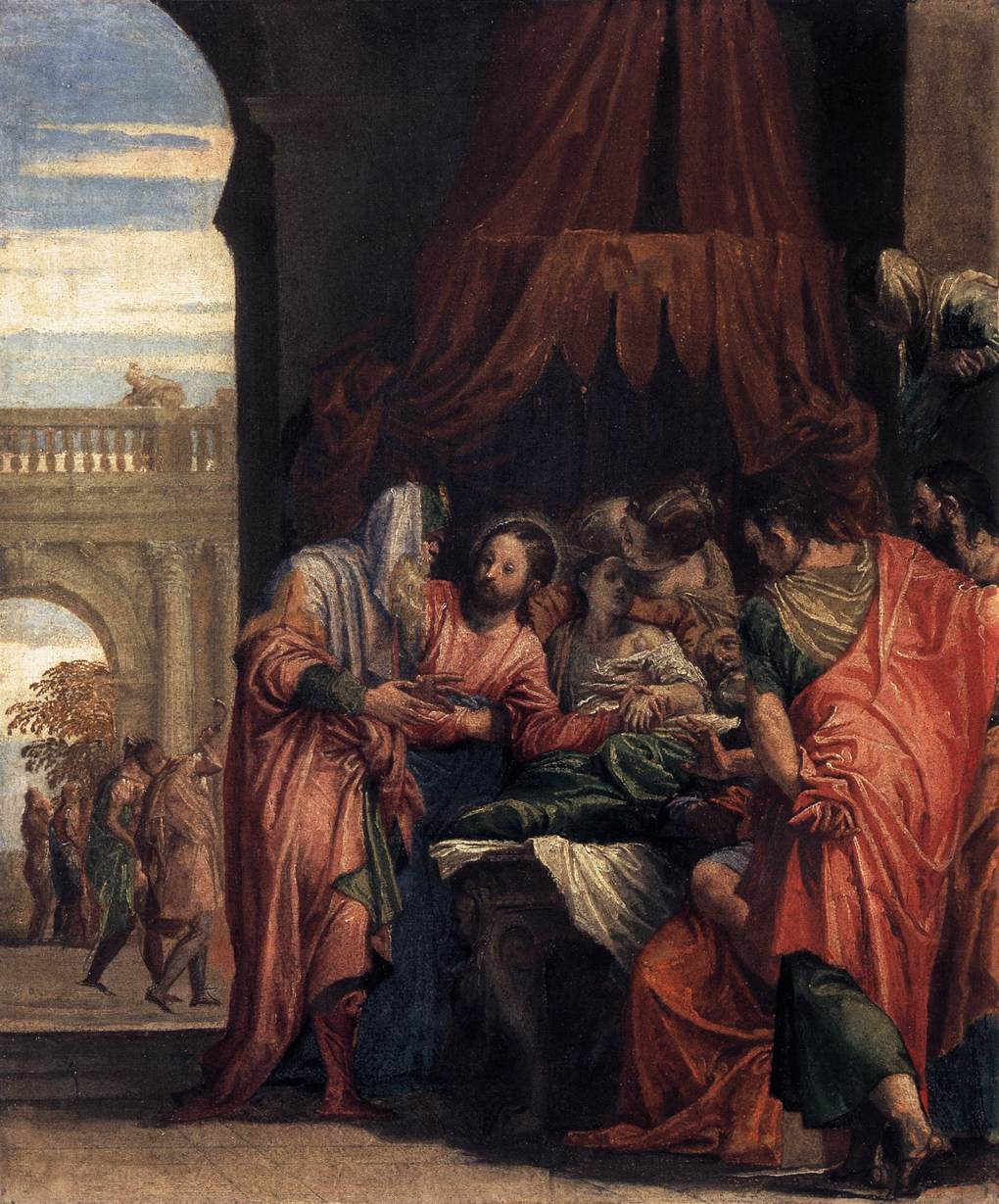
- "Raising of Jairus' Daughter" by Paolo Veronese, 1546
- Book: Gospel of Matthew
- Christian Bible part: New Testament

Matthew 9:18 is the 18th verse in the ninth chapter of the Gospel of Matthew in the New Testament.

== Content ==
In the original Greek according to Westcott-Hort this verse is:

Ταῦτα αὐτοῦ λαλοῦντος αὐτοῖς, ἰδού, ἄρχων ἐλθὼν προσεκύνει αὐτῷ, λέγων ὅτι Ἡ θυγάτηρ μου ἄρτι ἐτελεύτησεν· ἀλλὰ ἐλθὼν ἐπίθες τὴν χεῖρά σου ἐπ᾿ αὐτήν, καὶ ζήσεται.

In the King James Version of the Bible the text reads:

While he spake these things unto them, behold, there came a certain ruler, and worshipped him, saying, My daughter is even now dead: but come and lay thy hand upon her, and she shall live.

The New International Version translates the passage as:

While he was saying this, a ruler came and knelt before him and said, "My daughter has just died. But come and put your hand on her, and she will live."

== Analysis ==
Mark's gospel (5:22) speaks of this ruler as one of the rulers of the synagogue.

There is some debate if this the daughter is really dead at this point. Some believe she is, others think the ruler means she is near death, because often "those who are wretched, are wont to exaggerate their miseries, that they may more easily obtain the aid for which they seek." And perhaps the ruler thinking of the time of the journey has reckoned her dead at this point.

The ruler likely had heard that Jesus could heal by the laying on of his hands and bids him do the same here. MacEvilly notes that the faith of the ruler was less than that of the centurion, because he believed that Christ, even when absent, by a mere word could heal his servant.

== Commentary from the Church Fathers ==
Chrysostom: " After His instructions He adds a miracle, which should mightily discomfit the Pharisees, because he who came to beg this miracle, was a ruler of the synagogue, and the mourning was great, for she was his only child, and of the age of twelve years, that is, when the flower of youth begins; While he spake these things unto them, behold, there came one of their chief men unto him."

Augustine: " This narrative is given both by Mark and Luke, but in a quite different order; namely, when after the casting out of the dæmons and their entrance into the swine, he had returned across the lake from the country of the Gerasenes. Now Mark does indeed tell us that this happened after He had recrossed the lake, but how long after he does not determine. Unless there had been some interval of time, that could not have taken place that Matthew relates concerning the feast in his house. After this, immediately follows that concerning the ruler of the synagogue’s daughter. If the ruler came to Him while He was yet speaking that of the new patch, and the new wine, then no other act of speech of his intervened. And in Mark’s account, the place where these things might come in, is evident. In like manner, Luke does not contradict Matthew; for what he adds, And behold a man, whose name was Jairus, (Luke 8:41.) is not to be taken as though it followed instantly what had been related before, but after that feast with the Publicans, as Matthew relates. While he spake these things unto them, behold, one of their chief men, namely, Jairus, the ruler of the synagogue, came to him, and worshipped him, saying, Lord, my daughter is even now dead. It should be observed, lest there should seem to be some discrepancy, that the other two Evangelists represent her as at the point of death, but yet not dead, but so as afterwards to say that there came afterwards some saying, She is dead, trouble not the Master, for Matthew for the sake of shortness represents the Lord as having been asked at first to do that which it is manifest He did do, namely, raise the dead. He looks not at the words of the father respecting his daughter, but rather his mind. For he had so far despaired of her life, that he made his request rather for her to be called to life again, thinking it impossible that she, whom he had left dying, should be found yet alive. The other two then have given Jairus’ words; Matthew has put what he wished and thought. Indeed had either of them related that it was the father himself that said that Jesus should not be troubled for she was now dead, in that case the words that Matthew has given would not have corresponded with the thoughts of the ruler. But we do not read that he agreed with the messengers. Hence we learn a thing of the highest necessity, that we should look at nothing in any man’s words, but his meaning to which his words ought to be subservient; and no man gives a false account when he repeats a man’s meaning in words other than those actually used."

Chrysostom: " Or; The ruler says, she is dead, exaggerating his calamity. As it is the manner of those that prefer a petition to magnify their distresses, and to represent them as something more than they really are, in order to gain the compassion of those to whom they make supplication; whence he adds, But come and lay thy hand upon her, and she shall live. See his dullness. He begs two things of Christ, to come, and to lay His hand upon her. This was what Naaman the Syrian required of the Prophet. For they who are constituted thus hard of heart have need of sight and things sensible."

Saint Remigius: " We ought to admire and at the same time to imitate the humility and mercifulness of the Lord; as soon as ever He was asked, He rose to follow him that asked; And Jesus rose, and followed him. Here is instruction both for such as are in command, and such as are in subjection. To these He has left an example of obedience; to those who are set over others He shows how earnest and watchful they should be in teaching; whenever they hear of any being dead in spirit, they should hasten to Him; And his disciples went with him."

| Preceded by Matthew 9:17 | Gospel of Matthew; Chapter 9 | Succeeded by Matthew 9:19 |
