= Matthew 9:17 =

- ← 9:16 9:18 →
- Book: Gospel of Matthew
- Christian Bible part: New Testament

Matthew 9:17 is a verse in the ninth chapter of the Gospel of Matthew in the New Testament.

== Content ==
In the original Greek according to Westcott-Hort this verse is:

Οὐδὲ βάλλουσιν οἶνον νέον εἰς ἀσκοὺς παλαιούς· εἰ δὲ μήγε, ῥήγνυνται οἱ ἀσκοί, καὶ ὁ οἶνος ἐκχεῖται, καὶ οἱ ἀσκοὶ ἀπολοῦνται· ἀλλὰ βάλλουσιν οἶνον νέον εἰς ἀσκοὺς καινούς, καὶ ἀμφότερα συντηροῦνται.

In the King James Version of the Bible the text reads:

Neither do men put new wine into old bottles: else the bottles break, and the wine runneth out, and the bottles perish: but they put new wine into new bottles, and both are preserved.

The New International Version translates the passage as:

Neither do men pour new wine into old wineskins. If they do, the skins will burst, the wine will run out and the wineskins will be ruined. No, they pour new wine into new wineskins, and both are preserved."

== Analysis ==
Lapide notes that Christ shows three different reasons why the disciples should not be fasting when He is present: By 1) the parable of the Spouse and the wedding, 2) the old and new garment, 3) the new wine, and the old wineskins. According to MacEvilly and Witham the sense of the parable is: As new wine, owing to the force of its fermentation bursts old skins, since they are worn and weak, loses both the wine and the skins; therefore new wine must be poured into new skins. So also new austerities and fasts should not be imposed at this time on the disciples, lest their spirits should be broken, and they forsake Christ. However they are renewed with the Holy Ghost at Pentecost.

== Commentary from the Church Fathers ==
Saint Remigius: " After two comparisons made, that of the wedding, and that of the undressed cloth, He adds a third concerning wine skins; Neither do men put new wine into old skins. By the old skins He means His disciples, who were not yet perfectly renewed. The new wine is the fulness of the Holy Spirit, and the depths of the heavenly mysteries, which His disciples could not then bear; but after the resurrection they became as new skins, and were filled with new wine when they received the Holy Spirit into their hearts. Whence also some said, These men are full of new wine. (Acts 2:13.)"

Chrysostom: " Herein He also shows us the cause of those condescending words which He often addressed to them because of their weakness."

Jerome: " Otherwise; By the old garment, and old skins, we must understand the Scribes and Pharisees; and by the piece of new cloth, and new wine, the Gospel precepts, which the Jews were not able to bear; so the rent was made worse. Something such the Galatians sought to do, to mix the precepts of the Law with the Gospel, and to put new wine into old skins. The word of the Gospel is therefore to be poured into the Apostles, rather than into the Scribes and Pharisees, who, corrupted by the traditions of the elders, were unable to preserve the purity of Christ’s precepts."

Glossa Ordinaria: " This shows that the Apostles being hereafter to be replenished with newness of grace, ought not now to be bound to the old observances."

Augustine: " Otherwise; Every one who rightly fasts, either humbles his soul in the groaning of prayer, and bodily chastisement, or suspends the motion of carnal desire by the joys of spiritual meditation. And the Lord here makes answer respecting both kinds of fasting; concerning the first, which is in humiliation of soul, He says, The children of the bridegroom cannot mourn. Of the other which has a feast of the Spirit, He next speaks, where He says, No man putteth a patch of undressed cloth. Then we must mourn because the Bridegroom is taken away from us. And we rightly mourn if we burn with desire of Him. Blessed they to whom it was granted before His passion to have Him present with them, to enquire of Him what they would, to hear what they ought to hear. Those days the fathers before His coming sought to see, and saw them not, because they were placed in another dispensation, one in which He was proclaimed as coming, not one in which He was heard as present. For in us was fulfilled that He speaks of, The days shall come when ye shall desire to see one of these days, and shall not be able. (Luke 17:22.) Who then will not mourn this? Who will not say, My tears have been my meat day and night, while they daily say unto me, Where is now thy God? (Ps. 42:3.) With reason then did the Apostle seek to die and to be with Christ."

Augustine: " That Matthew writes here mourn, where Mark and Luke write fast, shows that the Lord spake of that kind of fasting which pertains to humbling one’s self in chastisement; as in the following comparisons He may be supposed to have spoken of the other kind which pertains to the joy of a mind wrapt in spiritual thoughts, and therefore averted from the food of the body; showing that those who are occupied about the body, and owing to this retain their former desires, are not fit for this kind of fasting."

Hilary of Poitiers: " Figuratively; This His answer, that while the Bridegroom was present with them, His disciples needed not to fast, teaches us the joy of His presence, and the sacrament of the holy food, which none shall lack, while He is present, that is, while one keeps Christ in the eye of the mind. He says, they shall fast when He is taken away from them, because all who do not believe that Christ is risen, shall not have the food of life. For in the faith of the resurrection the sacrament of the heavenly bread is received."

Jerome: " Or; When He has departed from us for our sins, then is a fast to be proclaimed, then is mourning to be put on."

Hilary of Poitiers: " By these examples He shows that neither our souls nor bodies, being so weakened by inveteracy of sin, are capable of the sacraments of the new grace."

Rabanus Maurus: " The different comparisons all refer to the same thing, and yet are they different; the garment by which we are covered abroad signifies our good works, which we perform when we are abroad; the wine with which we are refreshed within is the fervor of faith and charity, which creates us anew within."

Preceded by Matthew 9:16	Gospel of Matthew; Chapter 9	Succeeded by Matthew 9:18
