= Château du Hugstein =

French castle

Coordinates: 47°55′15″N 7°11′31″E

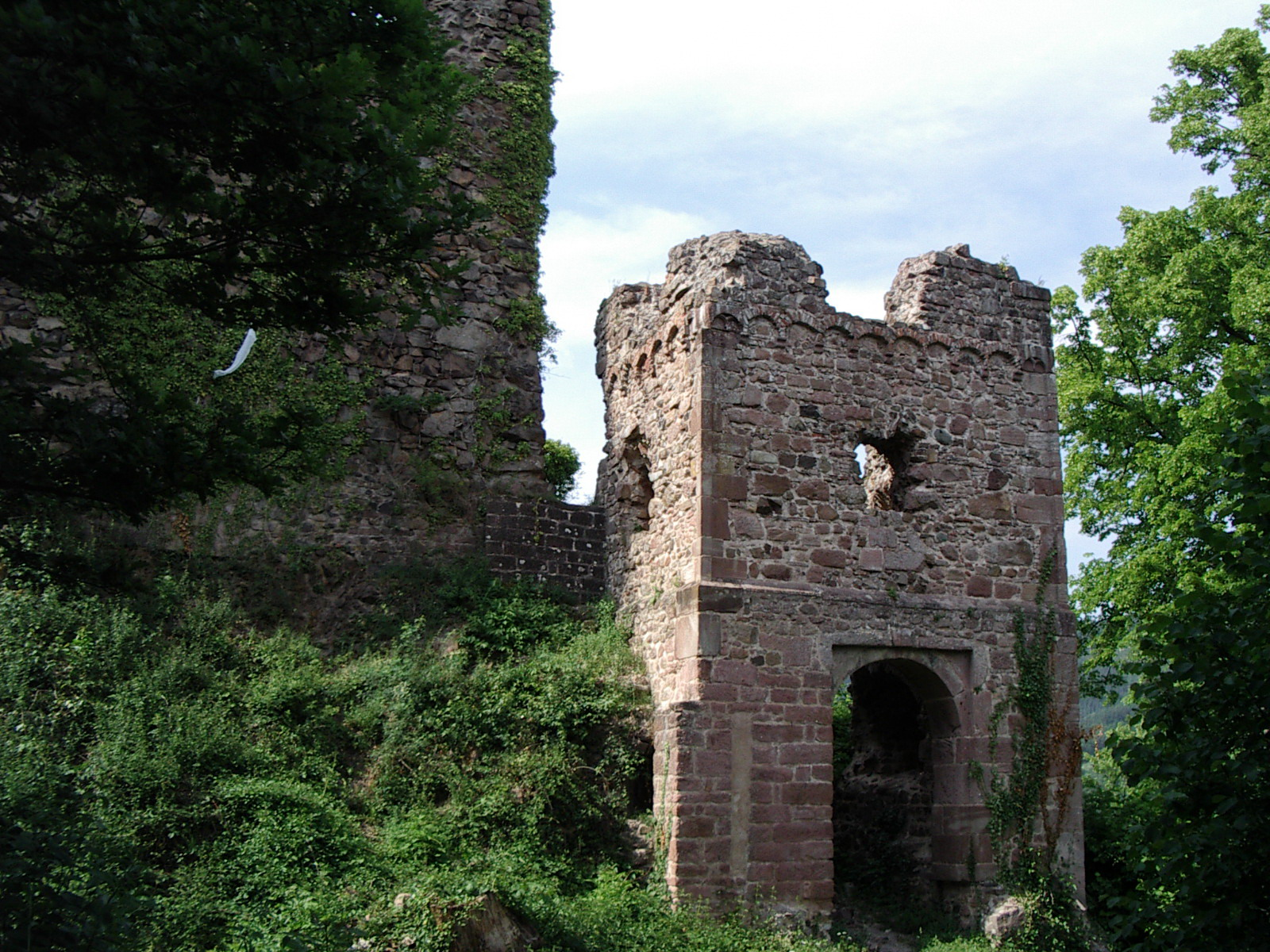
Gate house of the Château du Hugstein

The Château du Hugstein is a ruined castle on the borders of the communes of Buhl and Guebwiller in the Haut-Rhin département of France.

== History ==
The castle was built in 1227 by Hugo (Hugues) de Rothenbourg, abbot prince of Murbach from 1216 to 1236. It was constructed between the communes of Buhl and Guebwiller, to defend both the Murbach Abbey and the entrance to the Florival valley.

In 1313, the abbot Conrad Wiedergrun de Stauffenberg consecrated the castle chapel to the Holy Cross and Saint Benoît. Abbot Barthélémy d'Andlau modernised the castle during the 15th century, notably adding a gate tower decorated with a frieze and equipped with a drawbridge (visible in the photo).

Two new towers were also added to the defensive system of the castle even though its principal role had become residential. Georges de Masevaux continued with the restoration but died in 1542. The castle then became the subject of a quarrel about succession between Henri de Jestetten and his cousin Rodolphe Stoer de Stoerenbourg, abbot of Honcourt and Capitulary of Murbach. The latter finally won, but the fortress suffered from the affair. In 1598, the castle was struck by lightning. At the start of the 17th century, it was used as a prison, particularly for Lutherans and witches, of whom it is said that some were burned in front of the castle. Abandoned, it provided shelter for the poor before finally being used as a stone quarry. The stone which built the castle was extracted from the moat which surrounded it.

The cylindrical keep, 10 m in diameter, is comparatively rare in Alsace. The higher part of the keep was removed when the site served as a quarry.

The main corps de logis had two or, indeed, three floors giving the building a certain magnificence. The Gothic keystone to the chapel vault, decorated with an Easter lamb, is displayed at the Florival Museum (Musée Théodore Deck) in Guebwiller

The defences consisted of ramparts rounded at the corners, designed to create an illusion to attackers that the castle was equipped with cylindrical towers.

The Château du Hugstein has been listed since 1898 as a monument historique by the French Ministry of Culture (though the Ministry database refers to it as de Hugstein).

== See also ==
- List of castles in France

== Bibliography ==
- Nick, Jean Marie: "Le Hugstein, cet inconnu", Les Vosges n°2, 2006, p. 10-11
