= Matthew 9:9 =

- ← 9:8 9:10 →
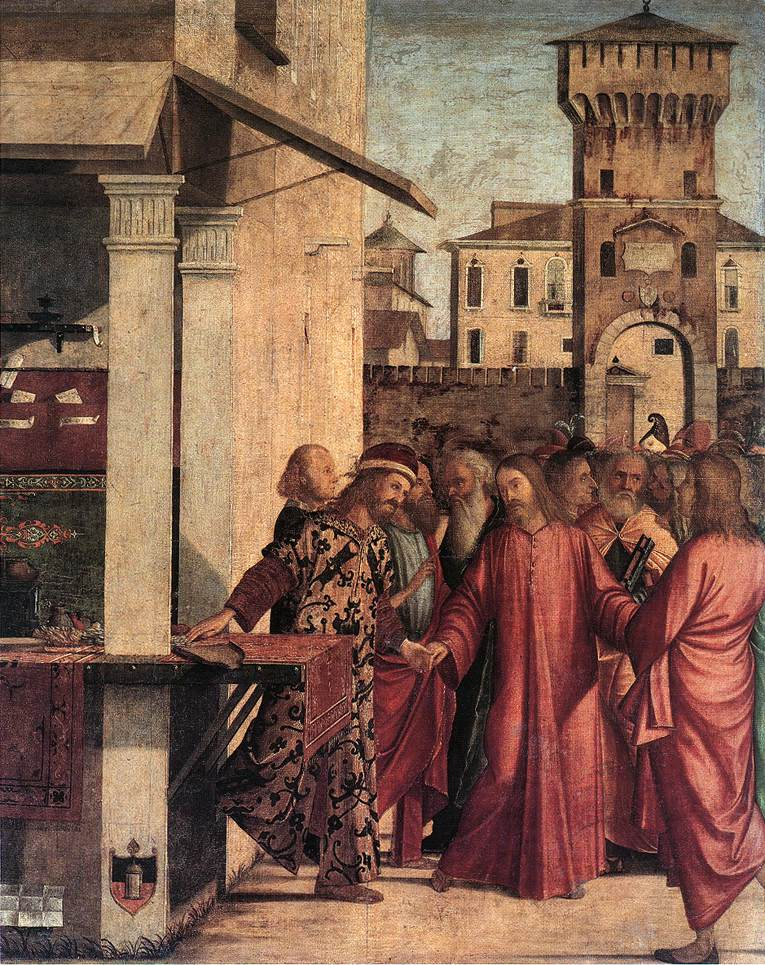
- The Calling of St. Matthew, by Vittore Carpaccio, 1502.
- Book: Gospel of Matthew
- Christian Bible part: New Testament

Matthew 9:9 is the ninth verse in the ninth chapter of the Gospel of Matthew in the New Testament.

== Content ==
In the original Greek according to Westcott-Hort this verse is:

Καὶ παράγων ὁ Ἰησοῦς ἐκεῖθεν εἶδεν ἄνθρωπον καθήμενον ἐπὶ τὸ τελώνιον, Ματθαῖον λεγόμενον, καὶ λέγει αὐτῷ, Ἀκολούθει μοι. Καὶ ἀναστὰς ἠκολούθησεν αὐτῷ.

In the King James Version of the Bible the text reads:

And as Jesus passed forth from thence, he saw a man, named Matthew, sitting at the receipt of custom: and he saith unto him, Follow me. And he arose, and followed him.

The New International Version translates the passage as:

As Jesus went on from there, he saw a man named Matthew sitting at the tax collector's booth. "Follow me," he told him, and Matthew got up and followed him.

== Analysis ==
Tradition holds that this custom house (τελώνιον) was located in Capernaum.

"Named Matthew:" Lapide notes that Matthew names himself, "both out of humility, that he might confess to the whole world that he had been a publican and a sinner," and also perhaps from gratitude, so he might make it widely known the exceeding grace of Jesus Christ to him. In the same manner St. Paul writes, "It is a faithful saying, and worthy of all acceptation, that Christ Jesus came into the world to save sinners, of whom I am chief." (1 Tim. 1:15.)

MacEvilly notes the condescension of Christ in calling Matthew, "the publican, and a man so infamous among the Jews, not only to grace but to His family and intimate friendship and Apostleship." He also comments on the efficacy of Christ's calling, and the ready obedience of Matthew. "Thus then as a magnet draws iron unto it, so did Christ draw Matthew."

Bridget of Sweden is said to have had a vision of this scene in which claims that Matthew said, “It was my desire at the time I was a publican to defraud no man, and I wished to find out a way by which I might abandon that employment, and cleave to God alone with my whole heart. When therefore He who loved me, even Jesus Christ was preaching, His call was a flame of fire in my heart; and so sweet were His words unto my taste, that I thought no more of riches than of straws: yea, it was delightful to me to weep for joy, that my God had deigned to call one of such small account, and so great a sinner as I to His grace. And as I clave unto my Lord, His burning words became fixed in my heart, and day and night I fed upon them by meditation, as upon sweetest food.”

== Commentary from the Church Fathers ==
Chrysostom: " Having wrought this miracle, Christ would not abide in the same place, lest He should rouse the envy of the Jews. Let us also do thus, not obstinately opposing those who lay in wait for us. And as Jesus departed thence, (namely from the place in which He had done this miracle,) he saw a man sitting at the receipt of custom, Matthew by name."

Jerome: " The other Evangelists from respect to Matthew have not called him by his common name, but say here, Levi, for he had both names. Matthew himself, according to that Solomon says. The righteous man accuses himself, (Prov. 18:17.) calls himself both Matthew and Publican, to show the readers that none need despair of salvation who turn to better things, seeing he from a Publican became an Apostle."

Glossa Ordinaria: " He says, sitting at the receipt of custom, that is, in the place where the tolls were collected. He was named Telonarius, from a Greek word signifying taxes."

Chrysostom: " Herein he shows the excellent power of Him that called him; while engaged in this dangerous office He rescued him from the midst of evil, as also Paul while he was yet mad against the Church. He saith unto him, Follow me. As you have seen the power of Him that calleth, so learn the obedience of him that is called; he neither refuses, nor requests to go home and inform his friends."

Saint Remigius: " He esteems lightly human dangers which might accrue to him from his masters for leaving his accounts in disorder, but, he arose, and followed him. And because he relinquished earthly gain, therefore of right was he made the dispenser of the Lord's talents."

Jerome: " Porphyry and the Emperor Julian insist from this account, that either the historian is to be charged with falsehood, or those who so readily followed the Saviour with haste and temerity; as if He called any without reason. They forget also the signs and wonders which had preceded, and which no doubt the Apostles had seen before they believed. Yea the brightness of effulgence of the hidden Godhead which beamed from His human countenance might attract them at first view. For if the loadstone can, as it is said, attract iron, how much more can the Lord of all creation draw to Himself whom He will!"

Chrysostom: " But why did He not call him at the same time with Peter and John and the others? Because he was then still in a hardened state, but after many miracles, and great fame of Christ, when He who knows the inmost secrets of the heart, perceived him more disposed to obedience, then He called him."

Augustine: " Or, perhaps it is more probable that Matthew here turns back to relate something that he had omitted; and we may suppose Matthew to have been called before the sermon on the mount; for on the mount, as Luke relates, the twelve, whom He also named Apostles, were chosen."

Glossa Ordinaria: " Matthew places his calling among the miracles; for a great miracle it was, a Publican becoming an Apostle."

Chrysostom: " Why is it then that nothing is said of the rest of the Apostles how or when they were called, but only of Peter, Andrew, James, John, and Matthew? Because these were in the most alien and lowly stations, for nothing can be more disreputable than the office of Publican, nothing more abject than that of fisherman."

Preceded by Matthew 9:8	Gospel of Matthew; Chapter 9	Succeeded by Matthew 9:10
