= Matthew 9:13 =

- ← 9:12 9:14 →
- Book: Gospel of Matthew
- Christian Bible part: New Testament

Matthew 9:13 is a verse in the ninth chapter of the Gospel of Matthew in the New Testament.

== Content ==
In the original Greek according to Westcott-Hort this verse is:

Πορευθέντες δὲ μάθετε τί ἐστιν, Ἔλεον θέλω, καὶ οὐ θυσίαν· οὐ γὰρ ἦλθον καλέσαι δικαίους, ἀλλ᾿ ἁμαρτωλοὺς εἰς μετάνοιαν.

In the King James Version of the Bible the text reads:

But go ye and learn what that meaneth, I will have mercy, and not sacrifice: for I am not come to call the righteous, but sinners to repentance.

The New International Version translates the passage as:

But go and learn what this means: 'I desire mercy, not sacrifice.' For I have not come to call the righteous, but sinners."

== Analysis ==
"But go" is said by many to be a rebuke, as if Jesus had said, "depart out of My sight". The words which are quoted are from Hosea 6:6. Lapide notes that sacrifice was considered one of the noblest elements of religion which shows the high regard placed on mercy.

The NIV leaves out "to repentance" (εἰς μετάνοιαν in Greek).

Some have understood this statement to mean that Jesus only calls sinners to repentance, while those who are just he merely calls to follow him. However church fathers such as Hilary, Jerome, and Bede understand the words to be, "I came not to call the righteous, that is, those who proudly, but falsely esteem and boast themselves to be righteous, when they are in truth sinners and hypocrites, such as you Pharisees."

== Commentary from the Church Fathers ==
Chrysostom: "Having first spoken in accordance with common opinion, He now addresses them out of Scripture, saying, Go ye, and learn what that meaneth, I will have mercy and not sacrifice."

Jerome: "This text from Osee (Hosea 6:6.) is directed against the Scribes and Pharisees, who, deeming themselves righteous, refused to keep company with Publicans and sinners."

Chrysostom: " As much as to say; How do you accuse me for reforming sinners? Therefore in this you accuse God the Father also. For as He wills the amendment of sinners, even so also do I. And He shows that this that they blamed was not only not forbidden, but was even by the Law set above sacrifice; for He said not, I will have mercy as well as sacrifice, but chooses the one and rejects the other."

Glossa Ordinaria: " Yet does not God contemn sacrifice, but sacrifice without mercy. But the Pharisees often offered sacrifices in the temple that they might seem to men to be righteous, but did not practise the deeds of mercy by which true righteousness is proved."

Rabanus Maurus: " He therefore warns them, that by deeds of mercy they should seek for themselves the rewards of the mercy that is above, and, not overlooking the necessities of the poor, trust to please God by offering sacrifice. Wherefore, He says, Go; that is, from the rashness of foolish fault-finding to a more careful meditation of Holy Scripture, which highly commends mercy, and proposes to them as a guide His own example of mercy, saying, I came not to call the righteous but sinners."

Augustine: " Luke adds to repentance, which explains the sense; that none should suppose that sinners are loved by Christ because they are sinners; and this comparison of the sick shows what God means by calling sinners, as a physician does the sick to be saved from their iniquity as from a sickness: which is done by penitence."

Hilary of Poitiers: " Christ came for all; how is it then that He says He came not for the righteous? Were there those for whom it needed not that He should come? But no man is righteous by the law. He shows how empty their boast of justification, sacrifices being inadequate to salvation, mercy was necessary for all who were set under the Law."

Chrysostom: " Whence we may suppose that He is speaking ironically, as when it is said, Behold now Adam is become as one of us. (Gen. 3:22.) For that there is none righteous on earth Paul shows, All have sinned, and need glory of God. (Rom. 3:23.) By this saying He also consoled those who were called; as though He had said, So far am I from abhorring sinners, that for their sakes only did I come."

Glossa Ordinaria: " Or; Those who were righteous, as Nathanael and John the Baptist, were not to be invited to repentance. Or. I came not to call the righteous, that is, the feignedly righteous, those who boasted of their righteousness as the Pharisees, but those that owned themselves sinners."

Rabanus Maurus: " In the call of Matthew and the Publicans is figured the faith of the Gentiles who first gaped after the gain of the world, and are now spiritually refreshed by the Lord; in the pride of the Pharisees, the jealousy of the Jews at the salvation of the Gentiles. Or, Matthew signifies the man intent on temporal gain; Jesus sees him, when He looks on him with the eyes of mercy. For Matthew is interpreted ‘given,’ Levi ‘taken,’ the penitent is taken out of the mass of the perishing, and by God's grace given to the Church. And Jesus saith unto him, Follow me, either by preaching, or by the admonition of Scripture, or by internal illumination."

Preceded by Matthew 9:12	Gospel of Matthew; Chapter 9	Succeeded by Matthew 9:14
