= Matthew 9:12 =

- ← 9:11 9:13 →
- Book: Gospel of Matthew
- Christian Bible part: New Testament

Matthew 9:12 is a verse in the ninth chapter of the Gospel of Matthew in the New Testament.

== Content ==
In the original Greek according to Westcott-Hort this verse is:

Ὁ δὲ Ἰησοῦς ἀκούσας εἶπεν αὐτοῖς, Οὐ χρείαν ἔχουσιν οἱ ἰσχύοντες ἰατροῦ, ἀλλ᾿ οἱ κακῶς ἔχοντες.

In the King James Version of the Bible the text reads:

But when Jesus heard that, he said unto them, They that be whole need not a physician, but they that are sick.

The New International Version translates the passage as:

On hearing this, Jesus said, "It is not the healthy who need a doctor, but the sick.

== Analysis ==
Lapide believes that Jesus "heard that," from the report of His disciples, because "even the Pharisees did not dare to make this charge against Christ."

MacEvilly draws parallels between a physician and Jesus, saying that just as a physician is honored to be a companion of the sick and is not overcome by their diseases, but rather drives them away, so in like manner Jesus with sinners and their vices.

== Commentary from the Church Fathers ==
Jerome: " For they do not come to Jesus while they remain in their original condition of sin, as the Pharisees and Scribes complain, but in penitence, as what follows proves; But Jesus hearing said, They that be whole need not a physician, but they that are sick."

Rabanus Maurus: " He calls Himself a physician, because by a wonderful kind of medicine He was wounded for our iniquities that He might heal the wound of our sin. By the whole, He means those who seeking to establish their own righteousness have not submitted to the true righteousness of God. By the sick, (Rom. 10:3.) He means those who, tied by the consciousness of their frailty, and seeing that they are not justified by the Law, submit themselves in penitence to the grace of God."

Preceded by Matthew 9:11	Gospel of Matthew; Chapter 9	Succeeded by Matthew 9:13
