= Matthew 9:10 =

- ← 9:9 9:11 →
- Book: Gospel of Matthew
- Christian Bible part: New Testament

Matthew 9:10 is a verse in the ninth chapter of the Gospel of Matthew in the New Testament.

== Content ==
In the original Greek according to Westcott-Hort this verse is:

Καὶ ἐγένετο αὐτοῦ ἀνακειμένου ἐν τῇ οἰκίᾳ, καὶ ἰδού, πολλοὶ τελῶναι καὶ ἁμαρτωλοὶ ἐλθόντες συνανέκειντο τῷ Ἰησοῦ καὶ τοῖς μαθηταῖς αὐτοῦ.

In the King James Version of the Bible the text reads:

And it came to pass, as Jesus sat at meat in the house, behold, many publicans and sinners came and sat down with him and his disciples.

The New International Version translates the passage as:

While Jesus was having dinner at Matthew's house, many tax collectors and "sinners" came and ate with him and his disciples.

== Analysis ==
Luke's gospel tells us that Levi, who is Matthew, made him a great feast in his own house, for Lapide tells us that Matthew "is silent about his virtues, outspoken about his errors". He invited many of his companions, hoping perhaps they would also be drawn to Christ.

It is said that tax collectors were particularly hated in Jesus' time because often greedy men undertook it from their love of money, and extorted unjust taxes, especially from the poor. Pope Francis notes that despite sitting with these tax collectors and various sinners, "Jesus was scandalized by none of them".

== Commentary from the Church Fathers ==
Thomas Aquinas collated a number of patristic comments on each verse of the gospels, including on this verse:

Glossa Ordinaria: "As a meet return for the heavenly mercy, Matthew prepared a great feast for Christ in his house, bestowing his temporal goods on Him of whom he looked to receive everlasting goods. It follows, And it came to pass as he sat at meat in the house."

Augustine: "Matthew has not said in whose house Jesus sat at meat (on this occasion), from which we might suppose, that this was not told in its proper order, but that what took place at some other time is inserted here as it happened to come into his mind; did not Mark and Luke who relate the same show that it was in Levi’s, that is, in Matthew’s house."

Chrysostom: "Matthew being honoured by the entrance of Jesus into his house, called together all that followed the same calling with himself; Behold many Publicans and sinners came and sat down with Jesus, and with his disciples."

Glossa Ordinaria: "The Publicans were they who were engaged in public business, which seldom or never can be carried on without sin. And a beautiful omen of the future, that he that was to be an Apostle and doctor of the Gentiles, at his first conversion draws after him a great multitude of sinners to salvation, already performing by his example what he was shortly to perform by word."

Glossa Ordinaria: "Tertullian says that these must have been Gentiles, because Scripture says, There shall be no payer of tribute in Israel, as if Matthew were not a Jew. But the Lord did not sit down to meat with Gentiles, being more especially careful not to break the Law, as also He gave commandment to His disciples below, Go not into the way of the Gentiles."

Jerome: "But they had seen the Publican turning from sins to better things, and finding place of repentance, and on this account they do not despair of salvation."

Preceded by Matthew 9:9	Gospel of Matthew; Chapter 9	Succeeded by Matthew 9:11
