= Alexandre Bida =

French painter (1813–1895)

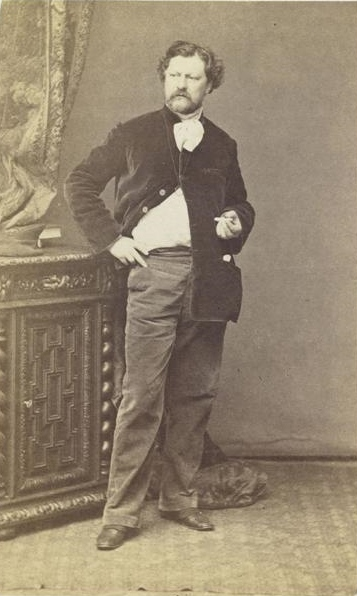
- Alexandre Bida, ca 1855
- Born: 1813; Toulouse, France
- Died: 1895 (aged 81–82); Buhl, German Empire
- Known for: Painting

Alexandre Bida (3 October 1813 – 2 January 1895) was a French painter.

== Life ==
He was born in Toulouse, and specialized in Orientalism and studied under Eugène Delacroix, but with an artist's eye for precision and perfection, he soon developed his own style. During Bida's youth, he traveled and worked in Egypt, Greece, Turkey, Lebanon, and Palestine. He became well known for his exhibition shows during the period between 1847 and 1861. He was also an illustrator of the Holy Bible. As a Bible illustrator, Bida's Les Saints Evangeles was published in 1873. In it, the four gospels were enriched by his twenty-eight etchings.

Of Bida's work, it was said that he brought a truth and genius that made his Christ reverent, refined, dignified, and strong. He died in Buhl, Germany in 1895 at the age of 82.

== Gallery ==
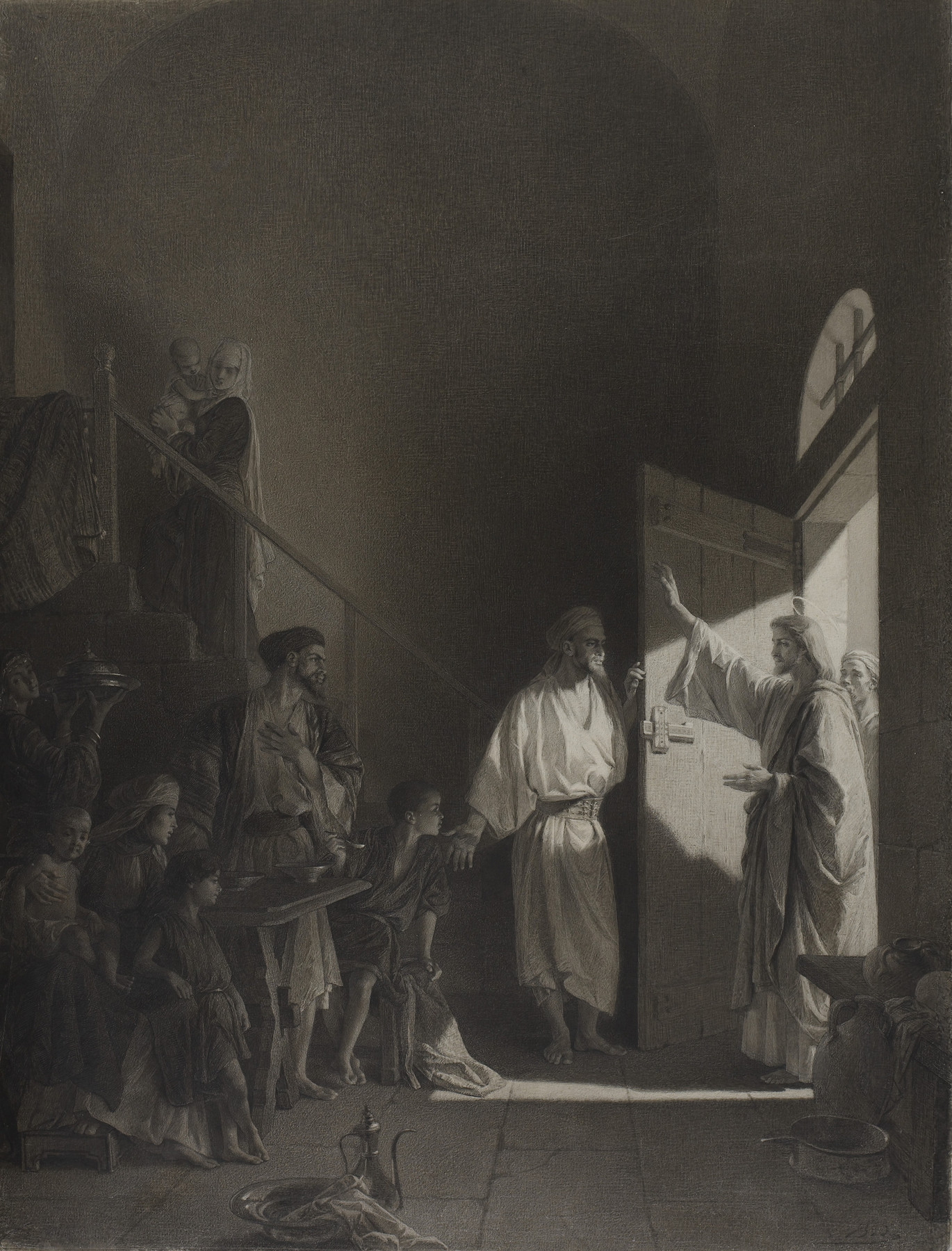
And Jesus Said: This Day is Salvation Come to This House, crayon paper, 62.8 × 48 cm, crayon on paper. Walters Art Museum.

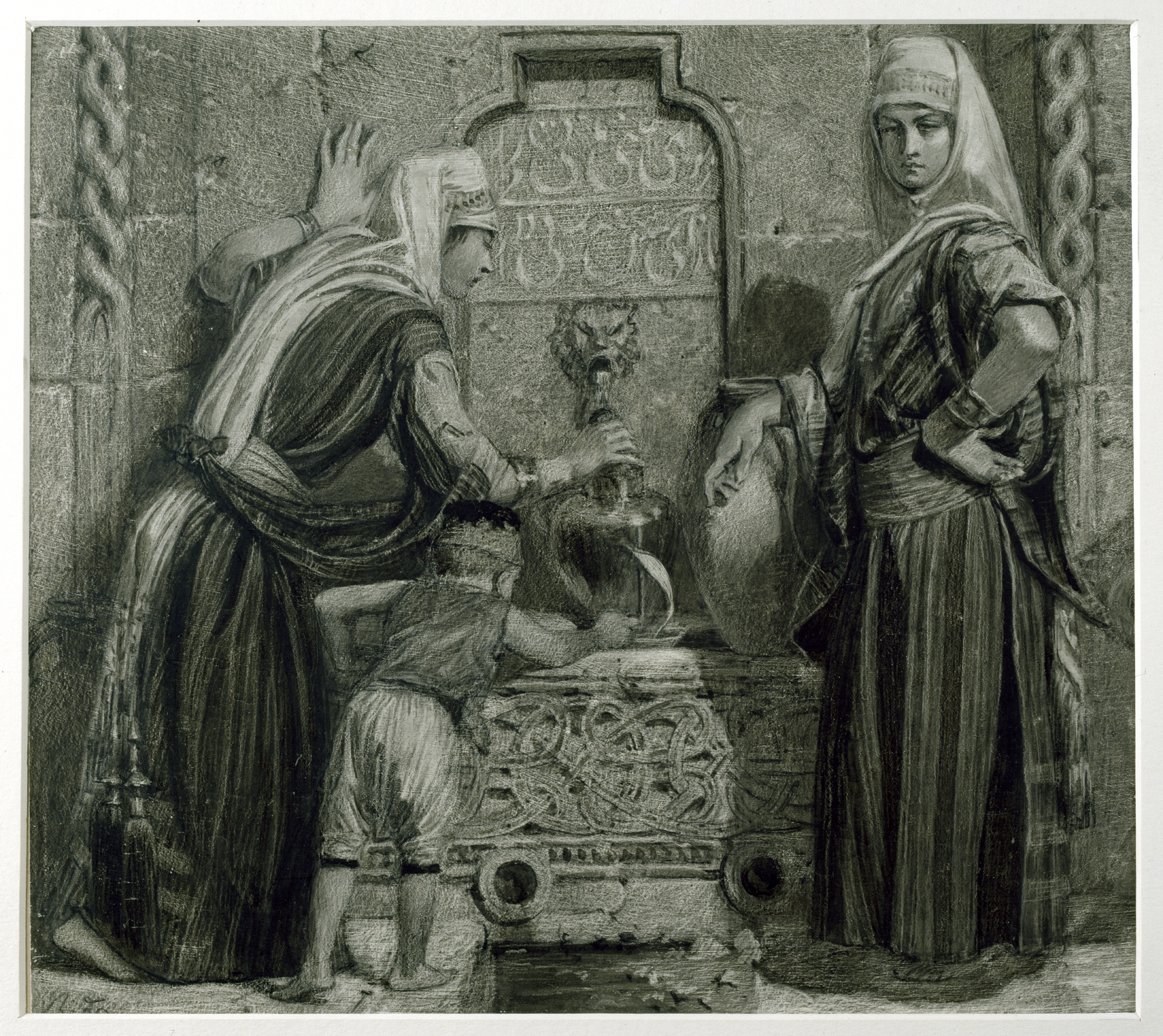
At the Fountain, 19th century, ink with scraping on cream, 22.7 x 25.2 cm. Walters Art Museum.

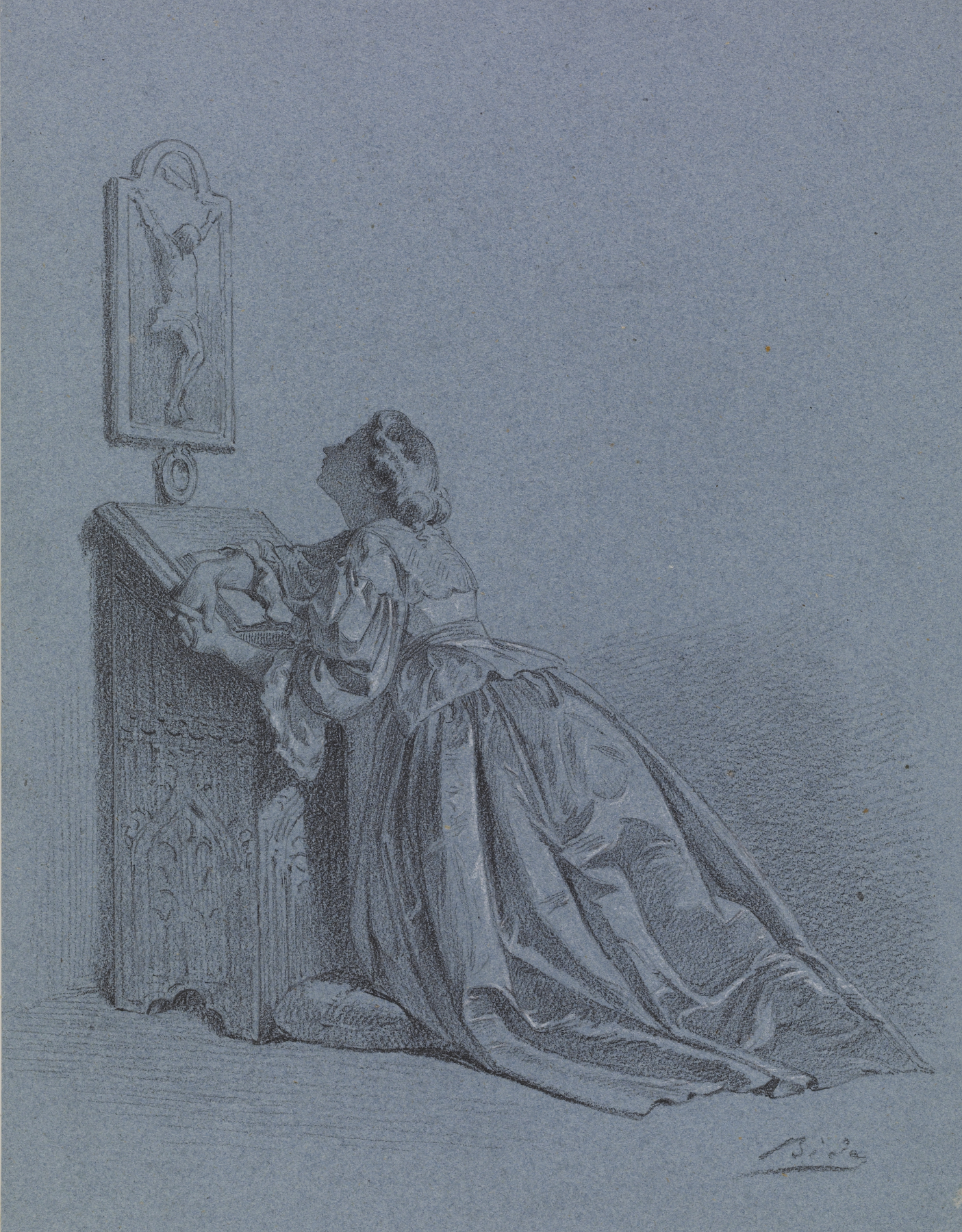
Woman Kneeling at Prie-dieu, 1865

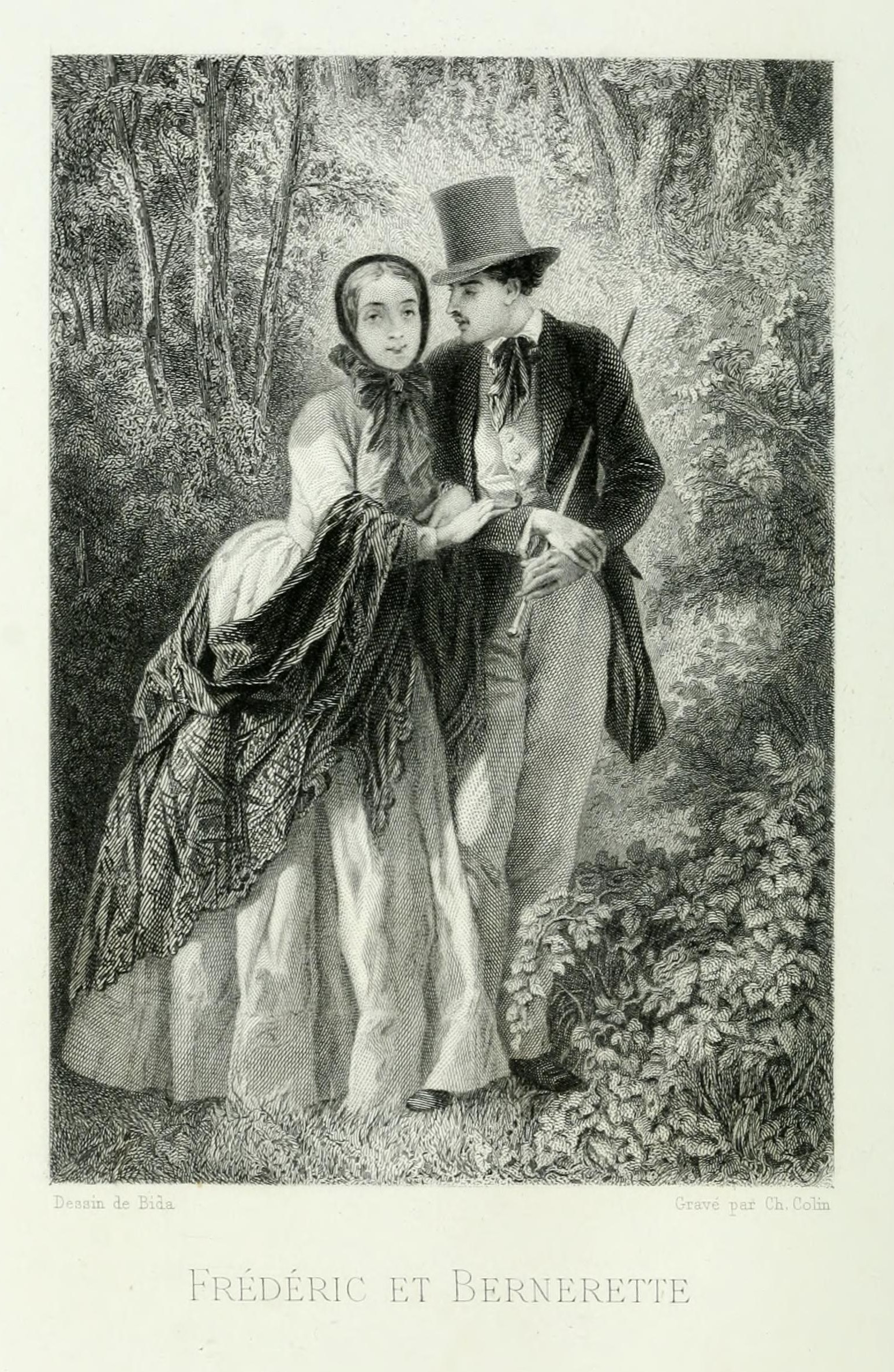
Frédéric and Bernerette

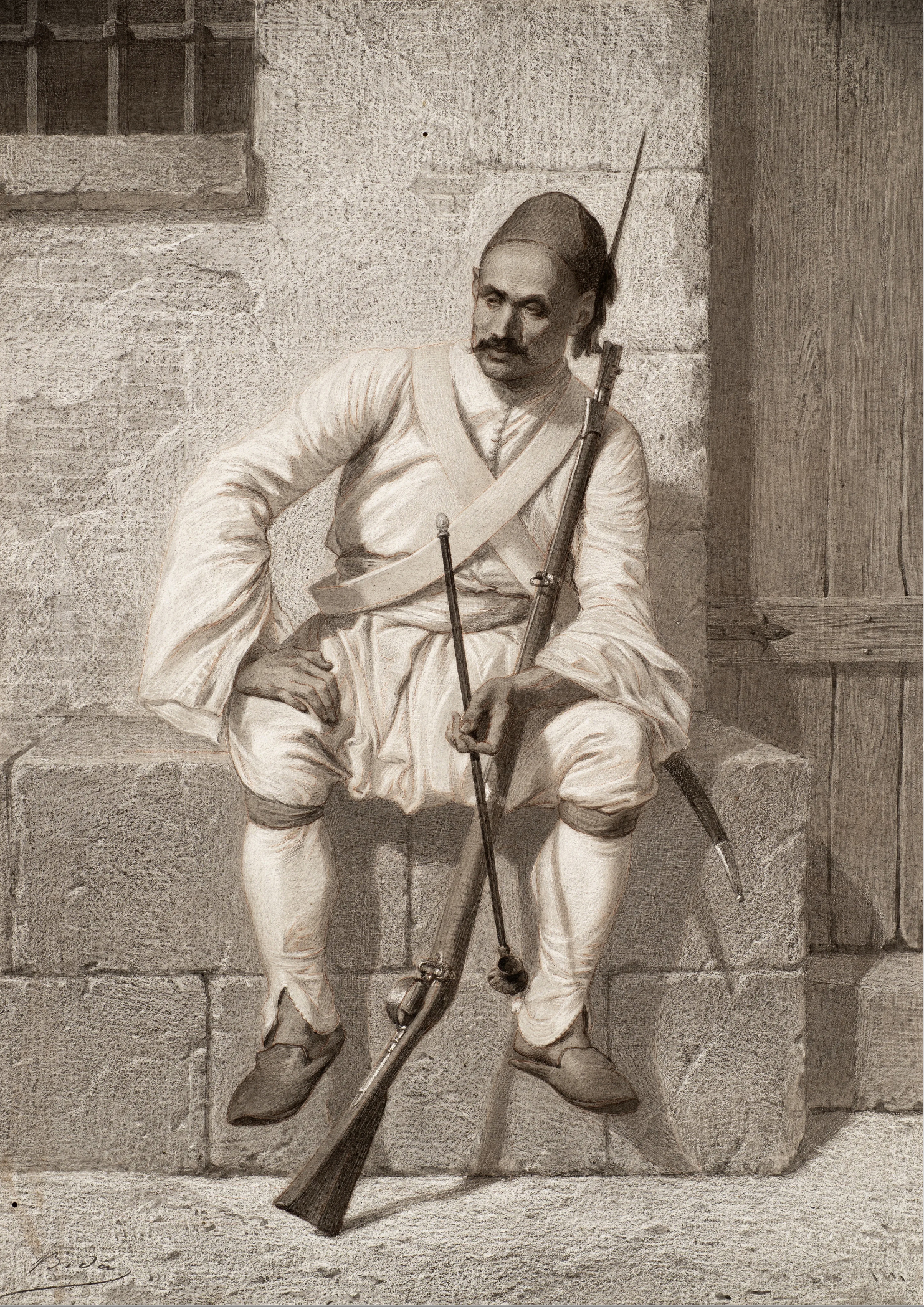
An Albanian soldier

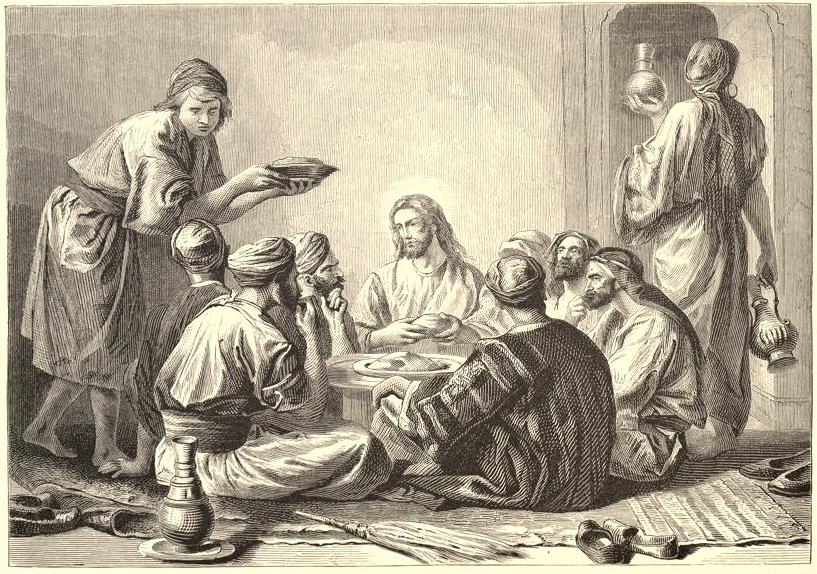
Jesus eating with sinners and tax-collectors

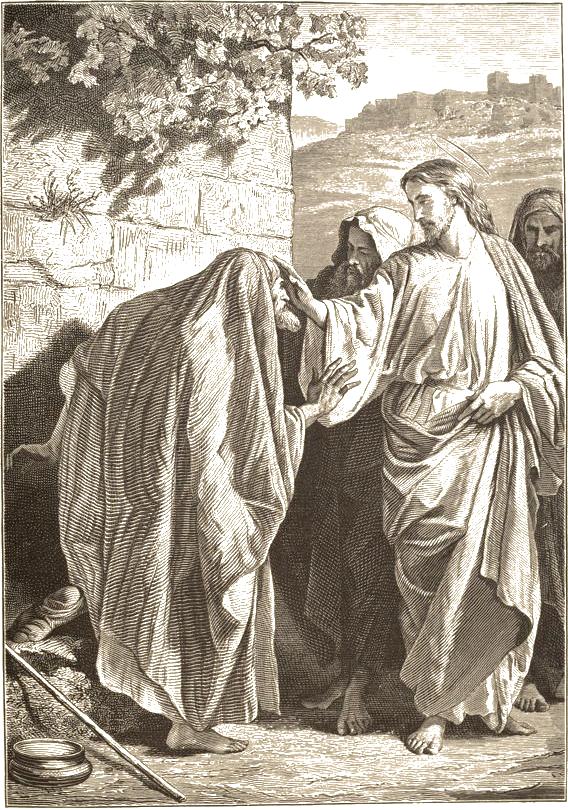
Jesus heals the leper

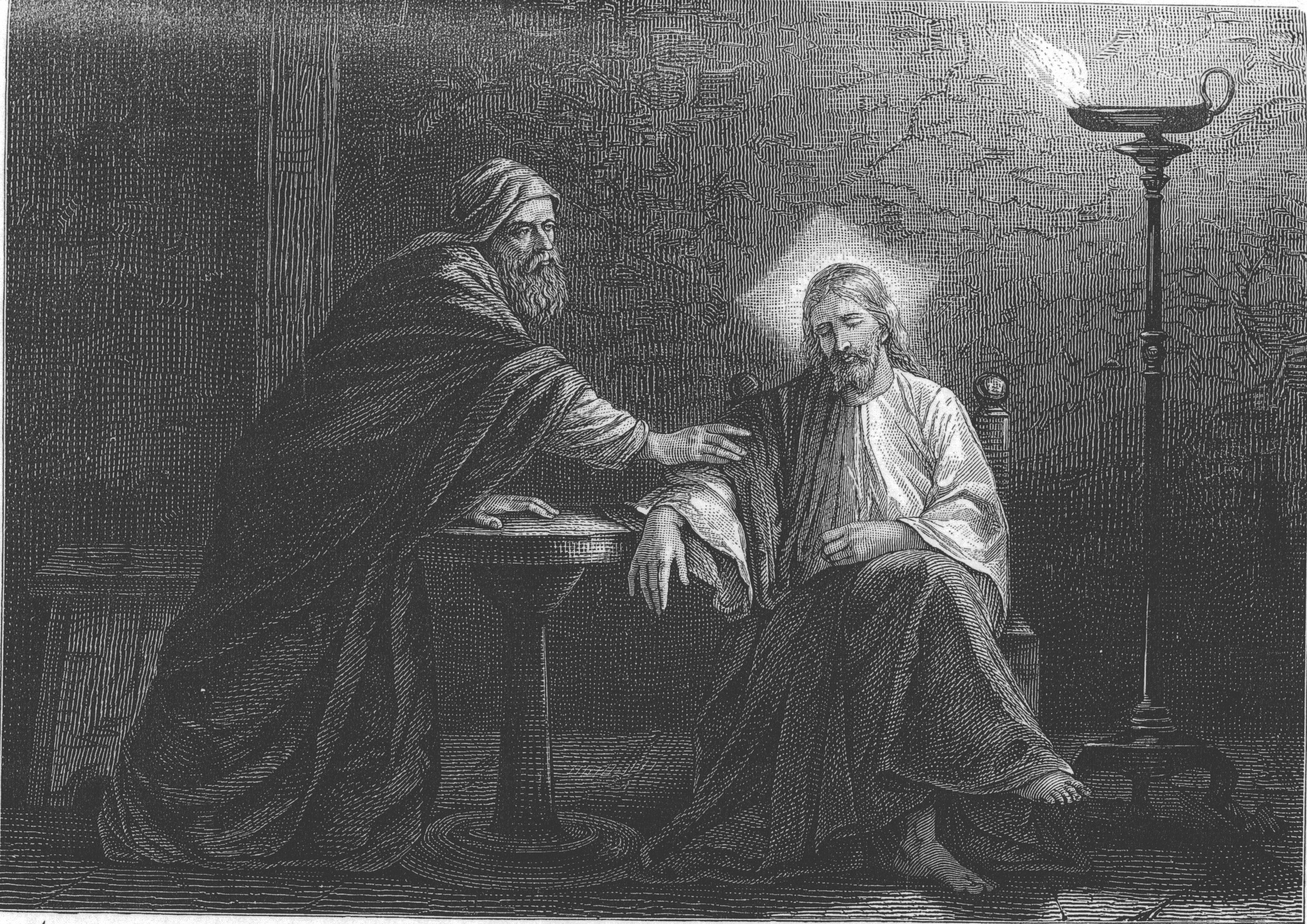
Jesus and Nicodemus, 1874

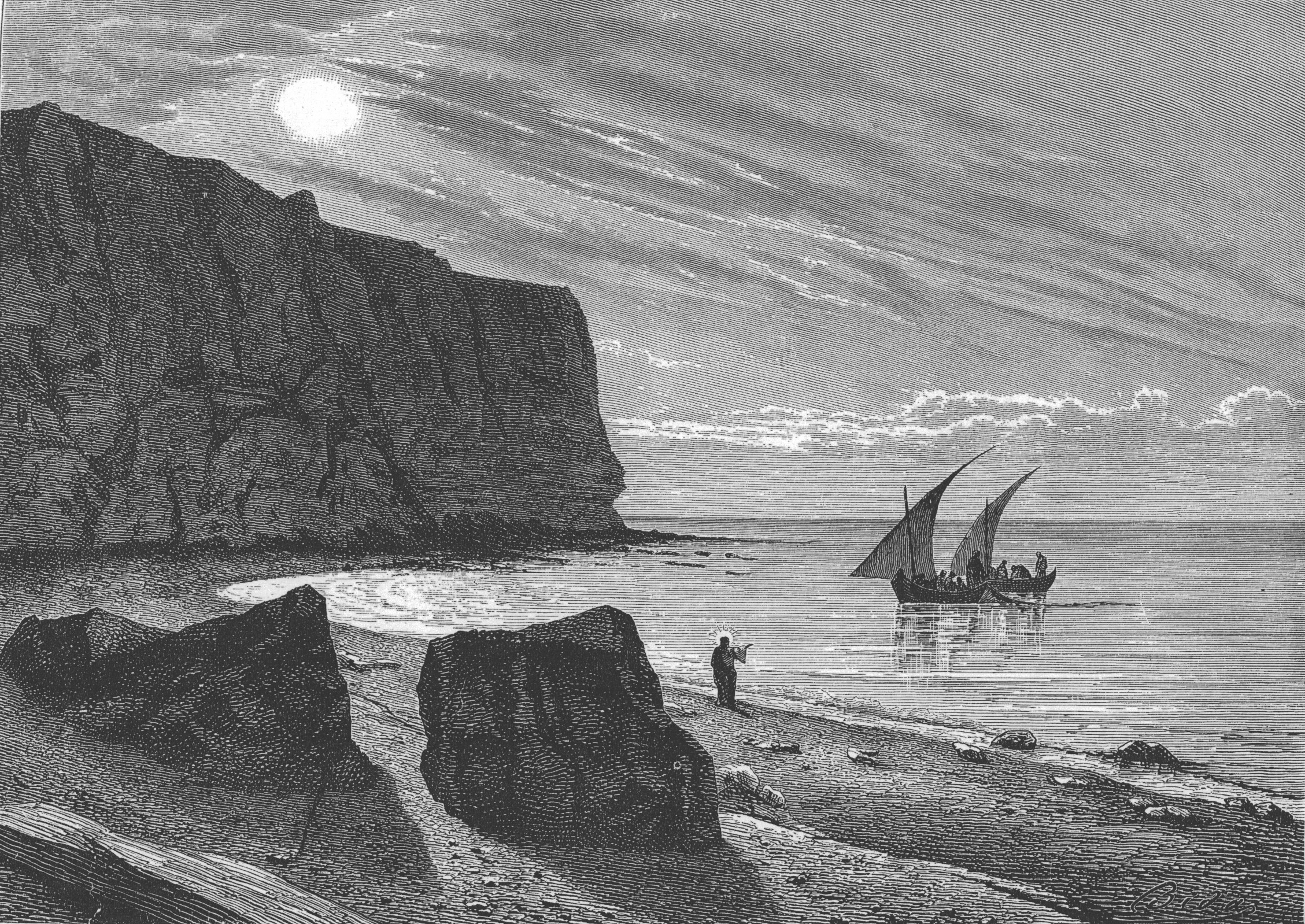
The miracle of the fishes

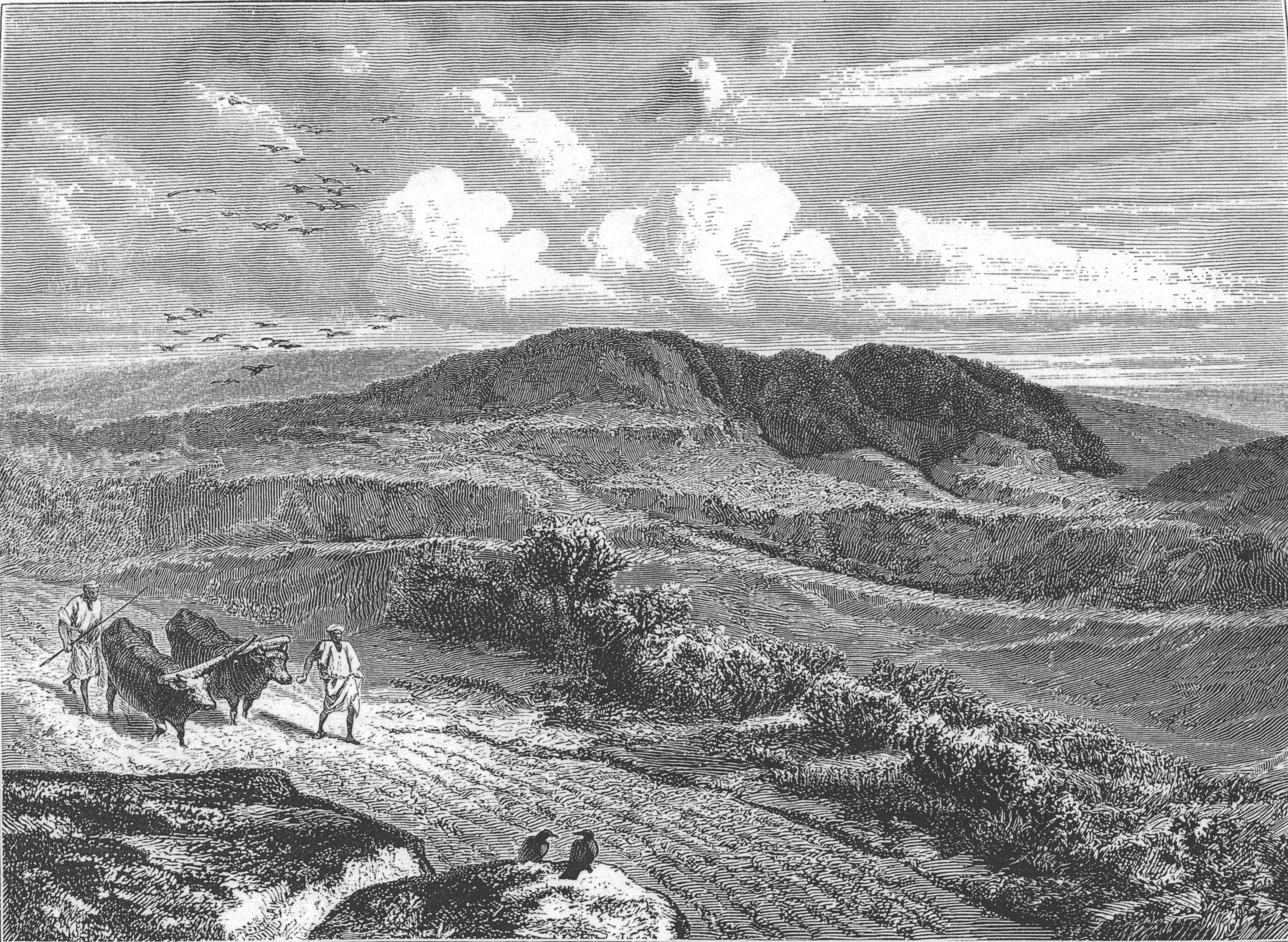
The parable of the sower
