= Matthew 9:11 =

- ← 9:10 9:12 →
- Book: Gospel of Matthew
- Christian Bible part: New Testament

Matthew 9:11 is a verse in the ninth chapter of the Gospel of Matthew in the New Testament.

== Content ==
In the original Greek according to Westcott-Hort this verse is:

Καὶ ἰδόντες οἱ Φαρισαῖοι εἶπον τοῖς μαθηταῖς αὐτοῦ, Διὰ τί μετὰ τῶν τελωνῶν καὶ ἁμαρτωλῶν ἐσθίει ὁ διδάσκαλος ὑμῶν;

In the King James Version of the Bible the text reads:

And when the Pharisees saw it, they said unto his disciples, Why eateth your Master with publicans and sinners?

The New International Version translates the passage as:

When the Pharisees saw this, they asked his disciples, "Why does your teacher eat with tax collectors and 'sinners'?"

== Analysis ==
Lapide states that these are the words, not of a mere question, but of an accusation. As if they said, "Your Master Christ acts contrary to the law of God and the traditions of the Fathers. Why do you listen to Him, and follow Him? He associates with sinners. He is bringing the stain of their sins and infamy upon you."

== Commentary from the Church Fathers ==
Chrysostom: " Thus they came near to our Redeemer, and that not only to converse with Him, but to sit at meat with Him; for so not only by disputing, or healing, or convincing His enemies, but by eating with them, He oftentimes healed such as were ill-disposed, by this teaching us, that all times, and all actions, may be made means to our advantage. When the Pharisees saw this they were indignant; And the Pharisees beholding said to his disciples, Why eateth your Master with Publicans and sinners? It should be observed, that when the disciples seemed to be doing what was sinful, these same addressed Christ, Behold, thy disciples are doing what it is not allowed to do on the Sabbath. (Mat. 12:2.) Here they speak against Christ to His disciples, both being the part of malicious persons, seeking to detach the hearts of the disciple from the Master."

Rabanus Maurus: " They are here in a twofold error; first, they esteemed themselves righteous, though in their pride they had departed far from righteousness; secondly, they charged with unrighteousness those who by recovering themselves from sin were drawing near to righteousness."

Augustine: " Luke seems to have related this a little differently; according to him the Pharisees say to the disciples, Why do ye eat and drink with Publicans and sinners? (Luke 5:30.) not unwilling that their Master should be understood to be involved in the same charge; insinuating it at once against Himself and His disciples. Therefore Matthew and Mark have related it as said to the disciples, because so it was as much an objection against their Master whom they followed and imitated. The sense therefore is one in all, and so much the better conveyed, as the words are changed while the substance continues the same."

Preceded by Matthew 9:10	Gospel of Matthew; Chapter 9	Succeeded by Matthew 9:12
