= Matthew 9:7 =

- ← 9:6 9:8 →
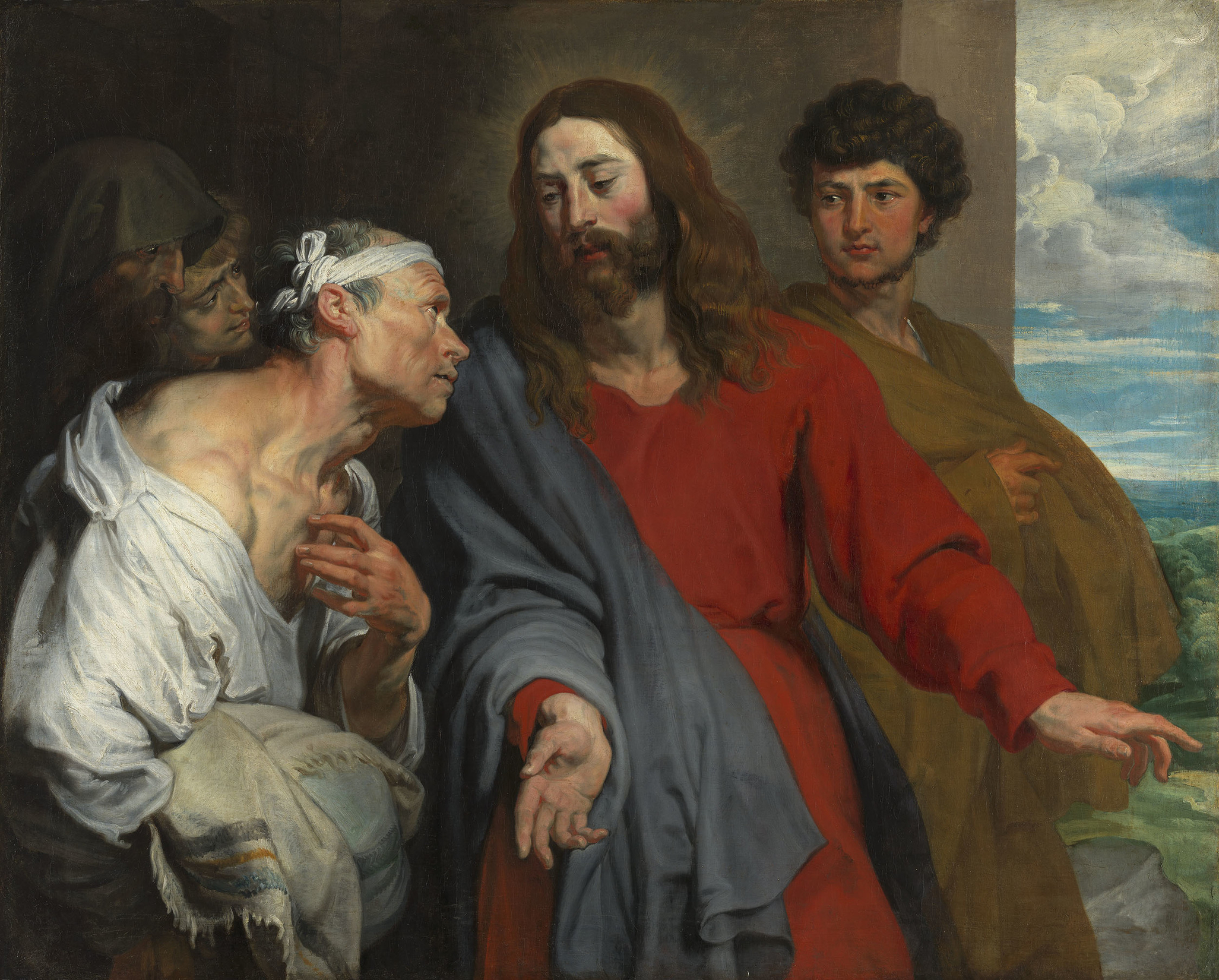
- Christ Healing the Paralytic, by Anthony van Dyck (1599–1641), c. 1619
- Book: Gospel of Matthew
- Christian Bible part: New Testament

Matthew 9:7 is the seventh verse in the ninth chapter of the Gospel of Matthew in the New Testament.

== Content ==
In the original Greek according to Westcott-Hort, Textus Receptus and Byzantine Majority, this verse is:

καὶ ἐγερθεὶς ἀπῆλθεν εἰς τὸν οἶκον αὐτοῦ.

In the King James Version of the Bible the text reads:

And he arose, and departed to his house.

The Holman Christian Standard Bible translates the passage as:

And he got up and went home.

For a collection of other versions see BibleHub Matthew 9:7.

== Analysis ==
This verse records how the man sick with palsy responds to his miraculous healing of by Jesus, after first receiving the forgiveness of sin and then Jesus' command to rise up. The story connects the person's infirmity to a spiritual cause (cf. Exodus 20:5; 1 Corinthians 11:29–30; James 5:14–15; in Matthew 9:32–34 a demon makes a man deaf and dumb), so by declaring that the man's sins are forgiven Jesus uproots the cause of the paralysis. The text in 4QPrNab, a document among the Dead Sea Scrolls, informs that some Jews think of one person who forgives another's sins with healing as the result. The fact that a paralytic man could instantaneously get up and walk home proves that a miracle was performed, and the healing happened through 'a word' in the most public manner. It proves that a divine "power" had been exerted by he who must also have the "power" and the "authority" to forgive sin. The parallel verse Mark 2:12 has the word "immediately", characteristic to the Gospel of Mark, and "took up the bed, and went forth before them all" to demonstrate the full obedience of the healed man. Another parallel verse, Luke 5:25, adds that the healed person went home "glorifying God", from the 'exultant joy of the soul freed from the burden of its sins', and the new vitality of his body.

This event happened in Capernaum, which at the time has become the hometown of Jesus (cf. Matthew 4:13).

== Sources ==
- Allison, Dale C. Jr. (2007). "57. Matthew". In Barton, John; Muddiman, John (eds.). The Oxford Bible Commentary (first (paperback) ed.). Oxford University Press. pp. 844–886. ISBN 978-0-19-927718-6.
- Coogan, Michael David (2007). Coogan, Michael David; Brettler, Marc Zvi; Newsom, Carol Ann; Perkins, Pheme (eds.). The New Oxford Annotated Bible with the Apocryphal/Deuterocanonical Books: New Revised Standard Version, Issue 48 (Augmented 3rd ed.). Oxford University Press. ISBN 978-0-19-528881-0.

Preceded by Matthew 9:6	Gospel of Matthew; Chapter 9	Succeeded by Matthew 9:8
