= Healing the paralytic at Capernaum =

Miracle carried out by Jesus according to the Bible

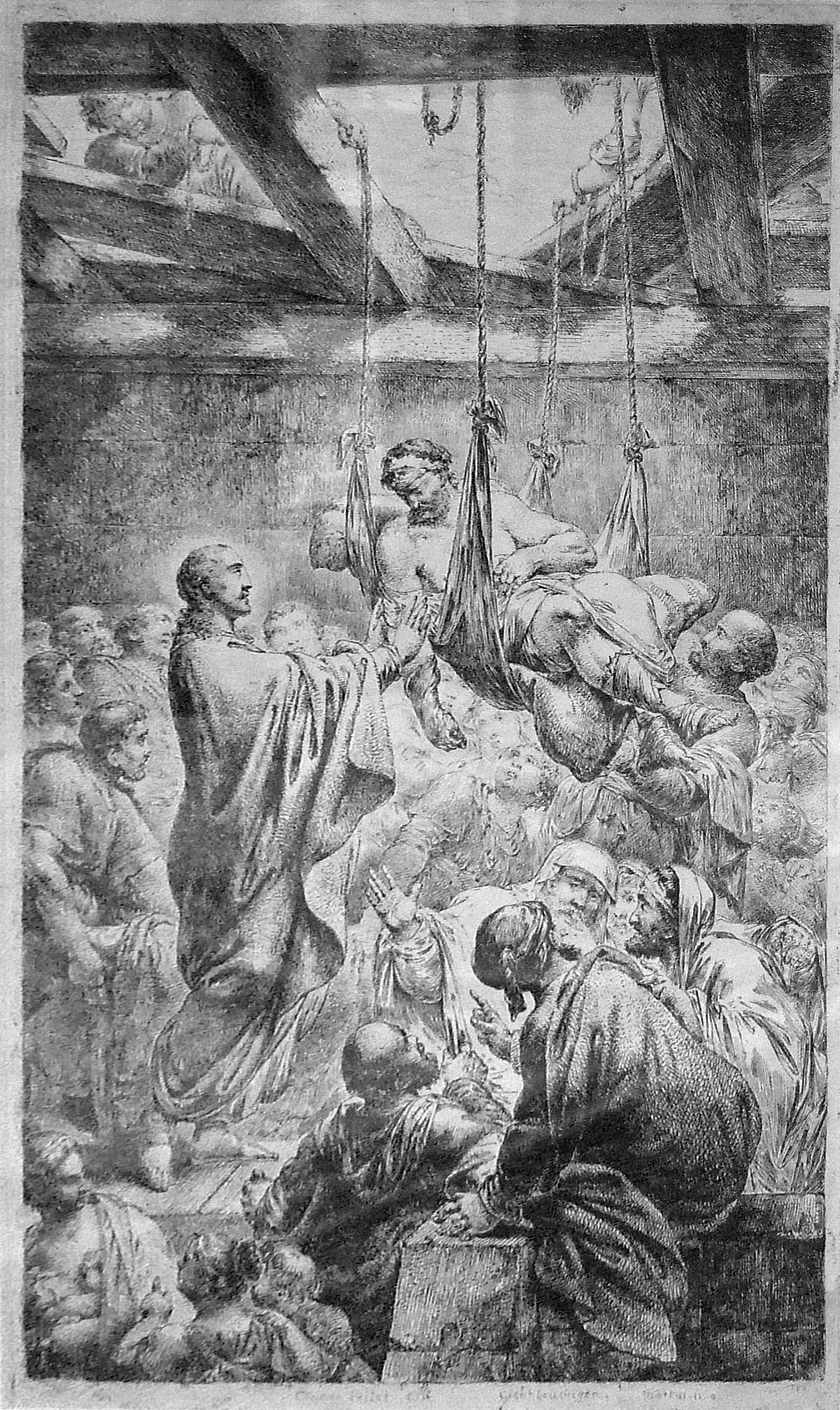
Christ healing the paralytic at Capernaum by Bernhard Rode 1780

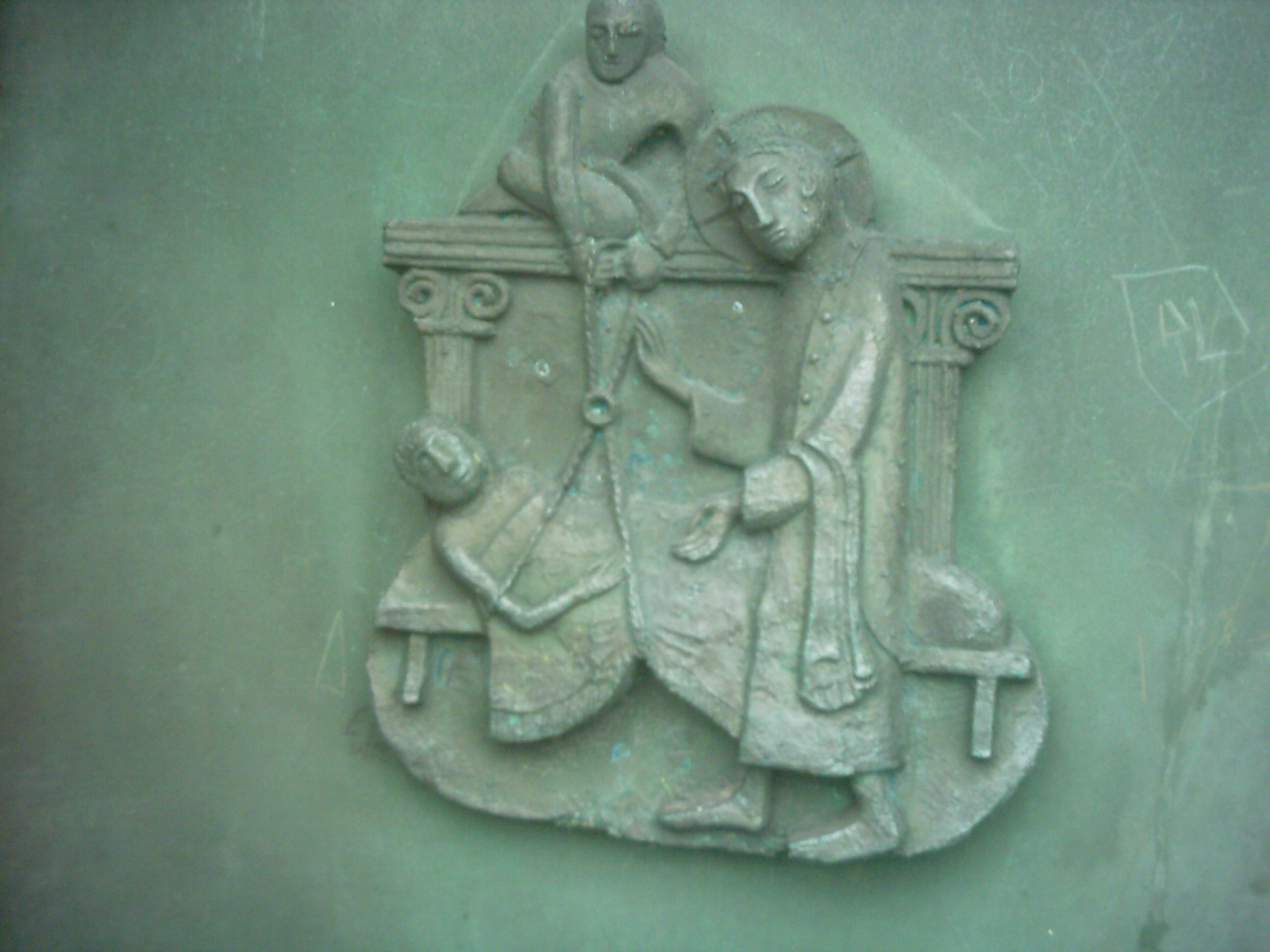
Jesus heals the paralytic at Capernaum. (Galway City Museum, Ireland)

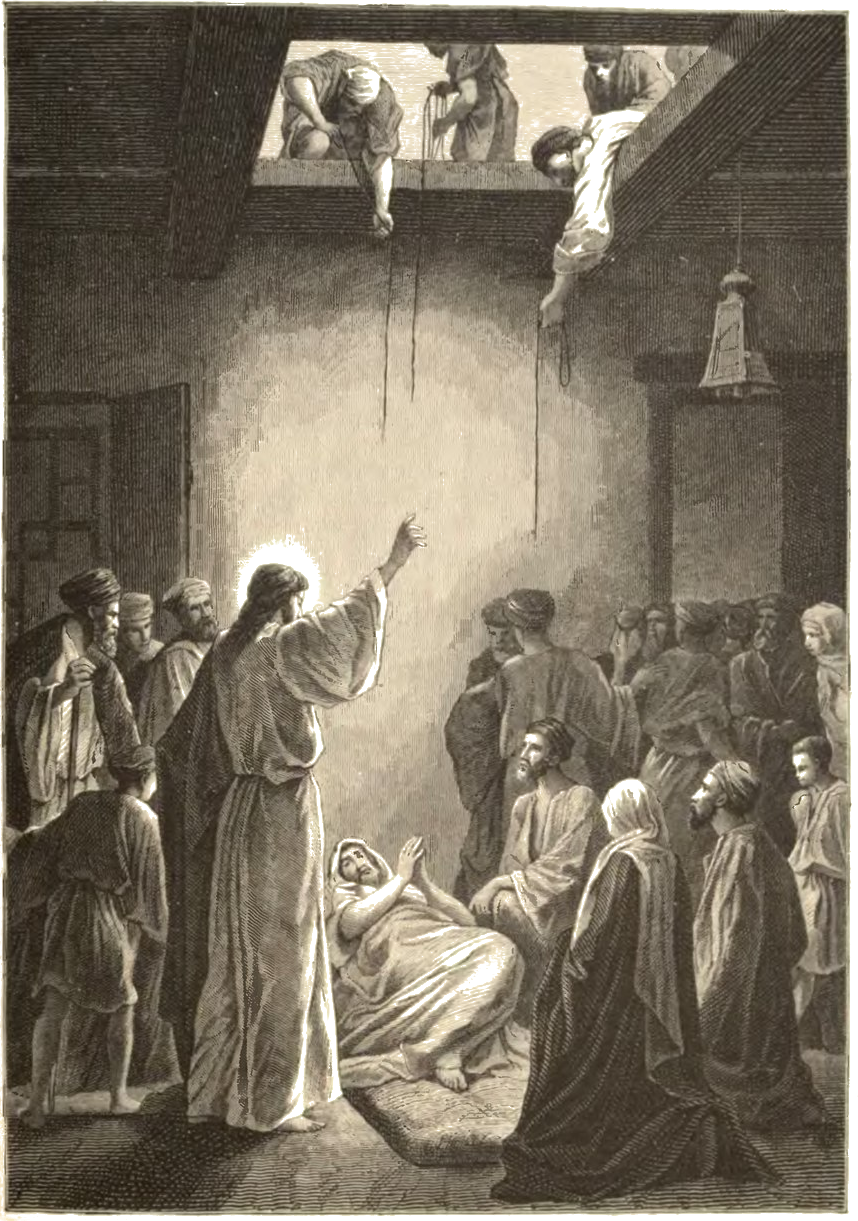
Jesus heals the man with palsy by Alexandre Bida (1875).

Healing the paralytic at Capernaum is one of the miracles of Jesus in the synoptic Gospels (Matthew 9:1–8, Mark 2:1–12, and Luke 5:17–26). Jesus was living in Capernaum and teaching the people there, and on one occasion the people gathered in such large numbers that there was no room left inside the house where he was teaching, not even outside the door. Some men came carrying a paralyzed man but could not get inside, so they made an opening in the roof above Jesus and then lowered the man down. When Jesus saw how faithful they had been, he said to the paralyzed man, "Son, your sins are forgiven."

Some of the teachers of the law interpreted this as blasphemy, since God alone can forgive sins. Mark states that "Jesus knew in his spirit that this was what they were thinking in their hearts." (2:8) Jesus said to them, "Why are you thinking these things? Which is easier: to say to the paralytic, 'Your sins are forgiven,' or to say, 'Get up, take your mat and walk'? But that you may know that the Son of Man has authority on earth to forgive sins ..." He says to the man "...get up, take your mat and go home." (8–11).

Mark's Gospel states that this event took place in Capernaum. In Matthew's Gospel, it took place in "his own town" which he had reached by crossing the Sea of Galilee, while Luke's Gospel does not specify where the miracle occurred. In all three it is followed by the calling of Matthew.

== Narrative ==
The passage from scripture is as follows:

A few days later, when Jesus again entered Capernaum, the people heard that he had come home. They gathered in such large numbers that there was no room left, not even outside the door, and he preached the word to them. Some men came, bringing to him a paralyzed man, carried by four of them. Since they could not get him to Jesus because of the crowd, they made an opening in the roof above Jesus by digging through it and then lowered the mat the man was lying on. When Jesus saw their faith, he said to the paralyzed man, "Son, your sins are forgiven."

Now some teachers of the law were sitting there, thinking to themselves, "Why does this fellow talk like that? He's blaspheming! Who can forgive sins but God alone?"

Immediately Jesus knew in his spirit that this was what they were thinking in their hearts, and he said to them, "Why are you thinking these things? Which is easier: to say to this paralyzed man, 'Your sins are forgiven,' or to say, 'Get up, take your mat and walk'? But I want you to know that the Son of Man has authority on earth to forgive sins." So he said to the man, "I tell you, get up, take your mat and go home." He got up, took his mat and walked out in full view of them all. This amazed everyone and they praised God, saying, "We have never seen anything like this!"

— Mark 2:1–12, New International Version

== Interpretation ==
In his Against Heresies, Church Father Irenaeus interprets the miracle as a demonstration of Jesus's divinity:

Therefore, by remitting sins, He did indeed heal man, while He also manifested Himself who He was. For if no one can forgive sins but God alone, while the Lord remitted them and healed men, it is plain that He was Himself the Word of God made the Son of man, receiving from the Father the power of remission of sins; since He was man, and since He was God, in order that since as man He suffered for us, so as God He might have compassion on us, and forgive us our debts, in which we were made debtors to God our Creator.

For Adam Clarke, there are three miracles of Jesus in this passage: the forgiveness of sins, the discernment of the private thoughts of the scribes, and the cure of the paralytic. According to John Gill, the fact that Jesus knew people's thoughts was sufficient demonstration of his Messiahship, according to the teaching of the Jews. This distinguished him from false Messiahs like Simon bar Kokhba, who was unmasked and executed for not having this power.

Cornelius a Lapide comments on the verse "And, behold, they brought to him ...", writing, "the paralytic man was carried by four bearers. Learn from this to care not only for thine own salvation, but for that of thy neighbours, and that earnestly, as well because charity demands it, as because God often chastises the good as well as the bad, because the good neglect to chastise and amend the faults of the bad."

Justus Knecht comments on the dignity of the soul, writing, "Jesus first healed the palsied man's soul, and then his body. He desired to teach us by this that He came to cure and save souls, that the soul is worth more than the body, and that the health of the body can only avail those whose soul is healthy. Our love of ourselves ought therefore to be bestowed first of all on our souls."

== See also ==
- Life of Jesus in the New Testament
- Ministry of Jesus
- Miracles of Jesus
- New Testament places associated with Jesus
- Parables of Jesus
