= Matthew 9:23 =

- ← 9:22 9:24 →
- Book: Gospel of Matthew
- Christian Bible part: New Testament

Matthew 9:23 is a verse in the ninth chapter of the Gospel of Matthew in the New Testament.

== Content ==
In the original Greek according to Westcott-Hort, this verse is:

Καὶ ἐλθὼν ὁ Ἰησοῦς εἰς τὴν οἰκίαν τοῦ ἄρχοντος, καὶ ἰδὼν τοὺς αὐλητὰς καὶ τὸν ὄχλον θορυβούμενον,

In the King James Version of the Bible the text reads:

And when Jesus came into the ruler’s house, and saw the minstrels and the people making a noise,

The New International Version translates the passage as:

When Jesus entered the ruler's house and saw the flute players and the noisy crowd,

== Analysis ==
According to St. Ambrose, "minstrels" were people who were hired at funerals to chant sad songs, moving the relations and neighbours to tears. There were both women minstrels and men. Jeremiah speaks of the women in 9:17, "Call for the mourning women, that they may come, and let them make haste, and take up a wailing for us, that our eyes may run down with tears, and our eyelids gush out with water." It was both a Jewish and Gentile custom. It is said that as a token of her virginity, the minstrels used flutes rather than trumpets as was usual for older people.

== Commentary from the Church Fathers ==
Thomas Aquinas collated a number of patristic comments on each verse of the gospels, including on this verse:

- Glossa Ordinaria: "After the healing of the woman with the issue of blood, follows the raising of the dead; And when Jesus was come into the ruler’s house."
- Chrysostom: "We may suppose that He proceeded slowly, and spake longer to the woman whom He had healed, that He might suffer the maid to die, and thus an evident miracle of restoring to life might be wrought. In the case of Lazarus also He waited till the third day. And when he saw the minstrels and the people making a noise; this was a proof of her death."
- Ambrose: "For by the ancient custom minstrels were engaged to make lamentation for the dead."

Preceded by Matthew 9:22	Gospel of Matthew; Chapter 9	Succeeded by Matthew 9:24
