= Matthew 9:3 =

- ← 9:2 9:4 →
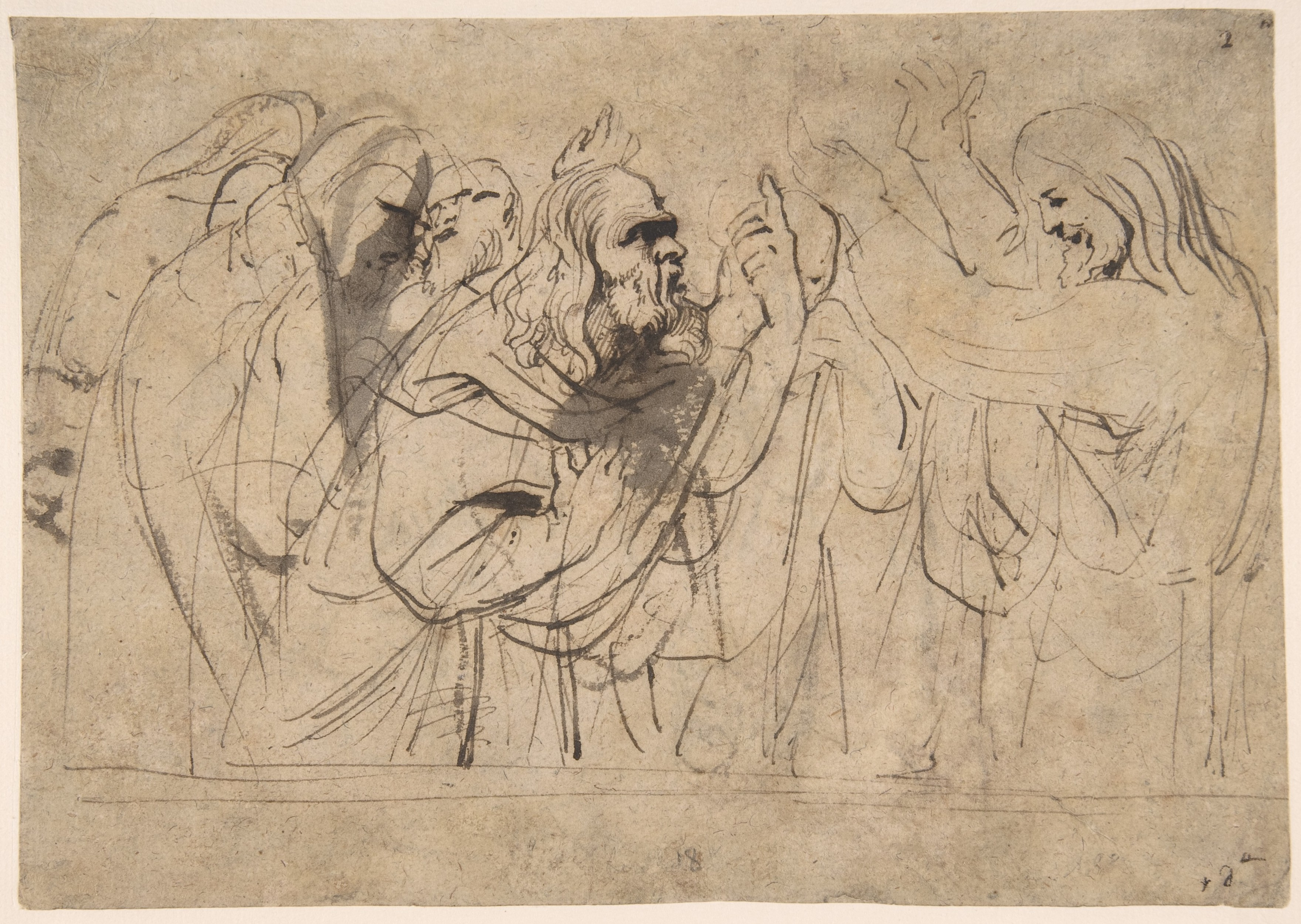
- "Christ and the Pharisees" by Anthony van Dyck (1599–1641); early 17th century
- Book: Gospel of Matthew
- Christian Bible part: New Testament

Matthew 9:3 is a verse in the ninth chapter of the Gospel of Matthew in the New Testament.

== Content ==
In the original Greek according to Westcott-Hort this verse is:

Καὶ ἰδού, τινὲς τῶν γραμματέων εἶπον ἐν ἑαυτοῖς, Οὗτος βλασφημεῖ.

In the King James Version of the Bible the text reads:

And, behold, certain of the scribes said within themselves, This man blasphemeth.

The New International Version translates the passage as:

At this, some of the teachers of the law said to themselves, "This fellow is blaspheming!"

== Analysis ==
Witham notes that the phrase "this man blasphemes", stems from the scribes thinking that Jesus, as a mere man, was pretending to have the power to forgive sins, which only God could do. This is a common charge against Catholic and Orthodox priests today. However, they argue that Christ, who was both God and man, communicated this power of forgiving sins in his name, to bishops and priests, as his ministers in the sacraments of baptism and confession (see John 20:23, "whose sins you shall forgive, they are forgiven them, etc.").

MacEvilly and Lapide agree that "said within themselves," means the scribes merely thought the statement and thus set up the miracle in the next verse that Jesus is able to know their thoughts.

== Commentary from the Church Fathers ==
Chrysostom: " The Scribes in their desire to spread an ill report of Him, against their will made that which was done be more widely known; Christ using their envy to make known the miracle. For this is of His surpassing wisdom to manifest His deeds through His enemies; whence it follows, Behold, some of the Scribes said among themselves, This man blasphemeth."

Preceded by Matthew 9:2	Gospel of Matthew; Chapter 9	Succeeded by Matthew 9:4
