= Matthew 9:5 =

- ← 9:4 9:6 →
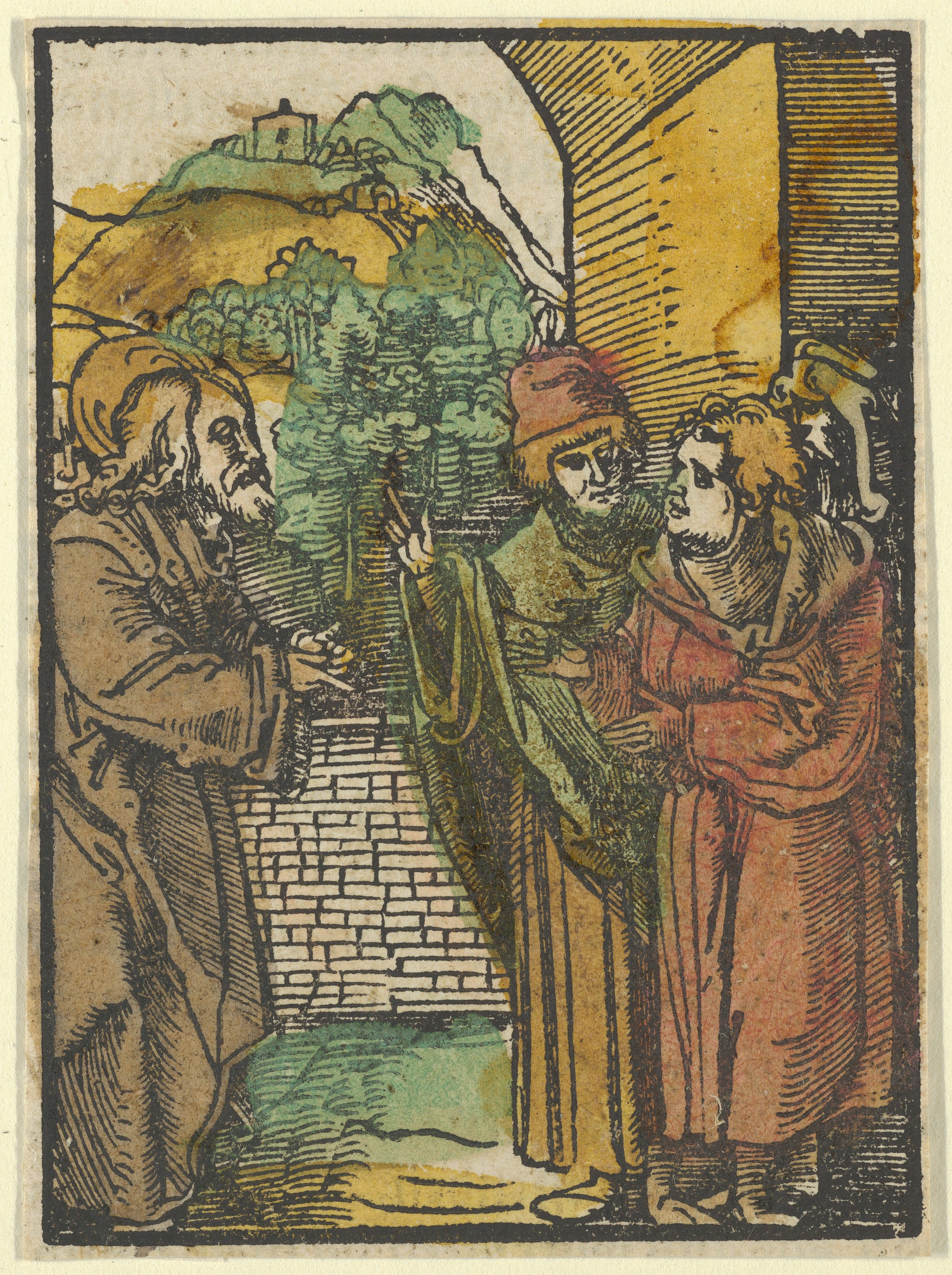
- "Christ and the Pharisees" from Das Plenarium (1517). Artists: Hans Leonhard Schäufelein (1480–1540), Adam Petri (1454–1527)
- Book: Gospel of Matthew
- Christian Bible part: New Testament

Matthew 9:5 is a verse in the ninth chapter of the Gospel of Matthew in the New Testament.

== Content ==
In the original Greek according to Westcott-Hort this verse is:

Τί γάρ ἐστιν εὐκοπώτερον, εἰπεῖν, Ἀφέωνταί σοι αἱ ἁμαρτίαι· ἢ εἰπεῖν, Ἔγειραι καὶ περιπάτει;

In the King James Version of the Bible the text reads:

For whether is easier, to say, Thy sins be forgiven thee; or to say, Arise, and walk?

The New International Version translates the passage as:

Which is easier: to say, 'Your sins are forgiven,' or to say, 'Get up and walk'?

== Analysis ==
Lapide gives two reasons why forgiving sins is more difficult:

1) Because sin, as an enemy of God, and much further away from God than is a paralytic or any created thing, because these are in themselves good. The goodness of God is opposed by sin and is repugnant to God.

2) Remission of sins is something above the natural order, for it is concerned with the supernatural order of grace. As Peter states (2 Peter 1:4) for by grace “we are made partakers of the divine nature,” as S. Peter says (2 Pet. 1:4).

Cornelius Jansen notes that with respect to God, both are equally easy and miraculously divine. In this particular act Jesus fulfils the words of John the Baptist, "his is he that taketh away the sins of the world."

== Commentary from the Church Fathers ==
Jerome: " We read in prophecy, I am he that blots out thy transgressions; (Is. 43:25.) so the Scribes regarding Him as a man, and not understanding the words of God, charged Him with blasphemy. But He seeing their thoughts thus showed Himself to be God, Who alone knoweth the heart; and thus, as it were, said, By the same power and prerogative by which I see your thoughts, I can forgive men their sins. Learn from your own experience what the paralytic has obtained. When Jesus perceived their thoughts, he said, Why think ye evil in your hearts?"

Chrysostom: " He did not indeed contradict their suspicions so far as they had supposed Him to have spoken as God. For had He not been equal to God the Father, it would have behoved Him to say, I am far from this power, that of forgiving sin. But He confirms the contrary of this, by His words and His miracle; Whether is it easier to say, Thy sins are forgiven thee, or to say, Arise, and walk? By how much the soul is better than the body, by so much is it a greater thing to forgive sin than to heal the body. But forasmuch as the one may be seen with the eyes, but the other is not sensibly perceived, He does the lesser miracle which is the more evident, to be a proof of the greater miracle which is imperceptible."

Preceded by Matthew 9:4	Gospel of Matthew; Chapter 9	Succeeded by Matthew 9:6
