= Matthew 9:6 =

- ← 9:5 9:7 →
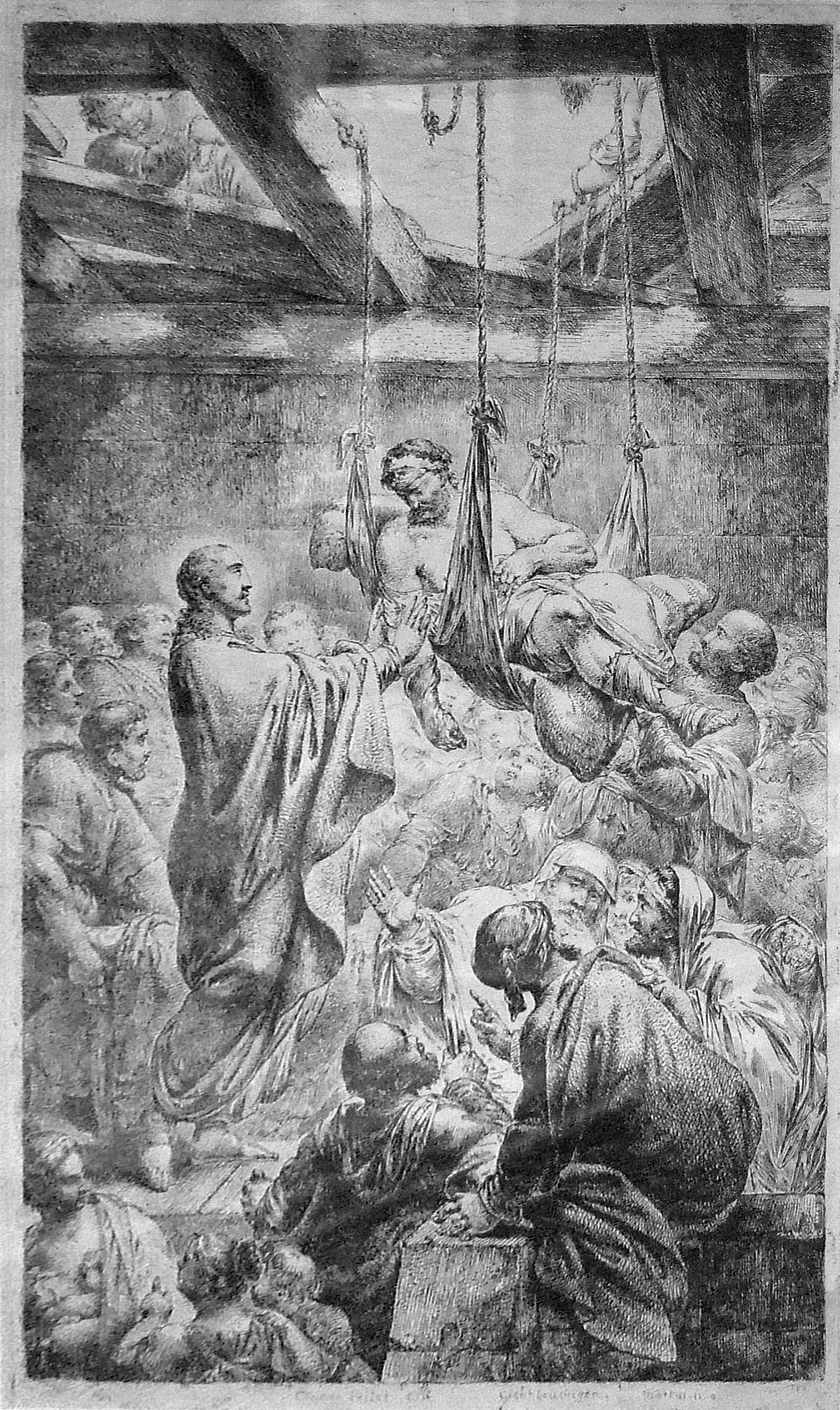
- " Christ Heals a Man Paralyzed". Engraving by Bernhard Rode, 1780.
- Book: Gospel of Matthew
- Christian Bible part: New Testament

Matthew 9:6 is the sixth verse in the ninth chapter of the Gospel of Matthew in the New Testament.

== Content ==
In the original Greek according to Westcott-Hort this verse is:

Ἵνα δὲ εἰδῆτε, ὅτι ἐξουσίαν ἔχει ὁ υἱὸς τοῦ ἀνθρώπου ἐπὶ τῆς γῆς ἀφιέναι ἁμαρτίας — τότε λέγει τῷ παραλυτικῷ — Ἐγερθεὶς ἆρόν σου τὴν κλίνην, καὶ ὕπαγε εἰς τὸν οἶκόν σου.

In the King James Version of the Bible the text reads:

But that ye may know that the Son of man hath power on earth to forgive sins, (then saith he to the sick of the palsy,) Arise, take up thy bed, and go unto thine house.

The New International Version translates the passage as:

But so that you may know that the Son of Man has authority on earth to forgive sins...." Then he said to the paralytic, "Get up, take your mat and go home."

== Analysis ==
Lapide points out the importance of the fact Jesus uses the expression, "Son of Man," because "Christ forgave sins, not only as He was God, but in that He was man." In a sense he is prefiguring his ability to make satisfaction for the sins of the whole world.

MacEvilly states that he says, "Arise, take up" so that all might see the clear proof of his recovered strength. "And go into your house," so that everyone who met him could testify to the miracle.

== Commentary from the Church Fathers ==
Jerome: " Whether or no his sins were forgiven He alone could know who forgave; but whether he could rise and walk, not only himself but they that looked on could judge of; but the power that heals, whether soul or body, is the same. And as there is a great difference between saying and doing, the outward sign is given that the spiritual effect may be proved; But that ye may know that the Son of Man hath power on earth to forgive sins."

Chrysostom: " Above, He said to the paralytic, Thy sins are forgiven thee, not, I forgive thee thy sins; but now when the Scribes made resistance, He shows the greatness of His power by saying, The Son of Man hath power on earth to forgive sins. And to show that He was equal to the Father, He said not that the Son of Man needed any to forgive sins, but that He hath power."

Glossa Ordinaria: " These words That ye may know, may be either Christ’s words, or the Evangelist’s words. As though the Evangelist had said, They doubted whether He could remit sins, But that ye may know that the Son of Man hath the power to remit sins, he saith to the paralytic. If they are the words of Christ, the connexion will be as follows; You doubt that I have power to remit sins, But that ye may know that the Son of Man hath power to remit sins—the sentence is imperfect, but the action supplies the place of the consequent clause, he saith to the paralytic, Rise, take up thy bed."

Peter Chrysologus: " That that which had been proof of his sickness, should now become proof of his recovered health. And go to thy house, that having been healed by Christian faith, you may not die in the faithlessness of the Jews."

Chrysostom: " This command He added, that it might be seen there was no delusion in the miracle; so it follows to establish the reality of the cure, And he arose, and went away to his own house. But they that stood by yet grovel on the earth, whence it follows, But the multitude seeing it were afraid, and glorified God, who had bestowed such power among men. For had they rightly considered among themselves, they would have acknowledged Him to be the Son of God. Meanwhile it was no little matter to esteem Him as one greater than men, and to have come from God."

Hilary of Poitiers: " Mystically; When driven out of Judæa, He returns into His own city; the city of God is the people of the faithful; into this He entered by a boat, that is, the Church."

Peter Chrysologus: " Christ has no need of the vessel, but the vessel of Christ; for without heavenly pilotage the bark of the Church cannot pass over the sea of the world to the heavenly harbour."

Hilary of Poitiers: " In this paralytic the whole Gentile world is offered for healing, he is therefore brought by the ministration of Angels; he is called Son, because he is God’s work; the sins of his soul which the Law could not remit are remitted him; for faith only justifies. Lastly, he shows the power of the resurrection, by taking up his bed, teaching that all sickness shall then be no more found in the body."

Jerome: " Figuratively; the soul sick in the body, its powers palsied, is brought by the perfect doctor to the Lord to be healed. For every one when sick, ought to engage some to pray for his recovery, through whom the halting footsteps of our acts may be reformed by the healing power of the heavenly word. These are mental monitors, who raise the soul of the hearer to higher things, although sick and weak in the outward body."

Peter Chrysologus: " The Lord requires not in this world the will of those who are without understanding, but looks to the faith of others; as the physician does not consult the wishes of the patient, when his malady requires other things."

Rabanus Maurus: " His rising up is the drawing off the soul from carnal lusts; his taking up his bed is the raising the flesh from earthly desires to spiritual pleasures; his going to his house is his returning to Paradise, or to internal watchfulness of himself against sin."

Gregory the Great: " Or by the bed is denoted the pleasure of the body. He is commanded now he is made whole to bear that on which he had lain when sick, because every man who still takes pleasure in vice is laid as sick in carnal delights; but when made whole he bears this because he now endures the wantonness of that flesh in whose desires he had before reposed."

Hilary of Poitiers: " It is a very fearful thing to be seized by death while the sins are yet unforgiven by Christ; for there is no way to the heavenly house for him whose sins have not been forgiven. But when this fear is removed, honour is rendered to God, who by His word has in this way given power to men, of forgiveness of sins, of resurrection of the body, and of return to Heaven."

Preceded by Matthew 9:5	Gospel of Matthew; Chapter 9	Succeeded by Matthew 9:7
