= Matthew 9:2 =

- ← 9:1 9:3 →
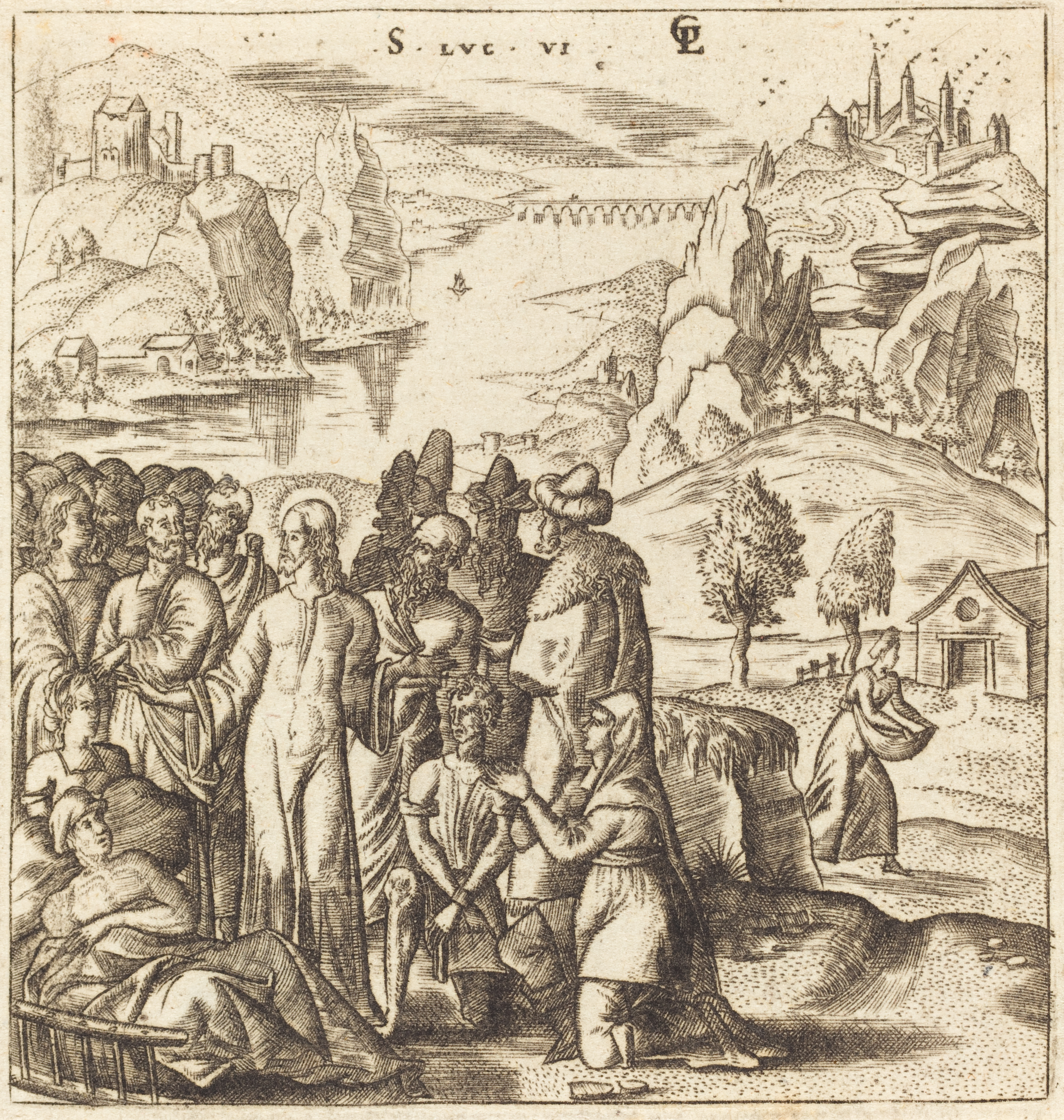
- "Christ Heals the Sick", by Léonard Gaultier (c. 1576/1580).
- Book: Gospel of Matthew
- Christian Bible part: New Testament

Matthew 9:2 is the second verse in the ninth chapter of the Gospel of Matthew in the New Testament.

== Content ==
In the original Greek according to Westcott-Hort this verse is:

Καὶ ἰδού, προσέφερον αὐτῷ παραλυτικὸν ἐπὶ κλίνης βεβλημένον· καὶ ἰδὼν ὁ Ἰησοῦς τὴν πίστιν αὐτῶν εἶπε τῷ παραλυτικῷ, Θάρσει, τέκνον· ἀφέωνταί σοι αἱ ἁμαρτίαι σου.

In the King James Version of the Bible the text reads:

And, behold, they brought to him a man sick of the palsy, lying on a bed: and Jesus seeing their faith said unto the sick of the palsy; Son, be of good cheer; thy sins be forgiven thee.

The New International Version translates the passage as:

Some men brought to him a paralytic, lying on a mat. When Jesus saw their faith, he said to the paralytic, "Take heart, son; your sins are forgiven."

== Analysis ==
Cornelius a Lapide comments on the words, "And seeing their faith, ..." which he says is clearly the faith of those who brought the paralytic to Christ. Because when they could not bring him into the house, they carried him up to the roof, (Note: This refers to the more detailed accounts in Mark's Gospel (Mark 2:1-12) and Luke's Gospel (Luke 5:17-26)) although he also adds the faith of the paralytic in the group since Jesus would never have forgiven his sins, "unless he had had faith". Pope Francis notes a parallel between the words "Take heart, son!" in this verse and "Take heart, daughter!" in Matthew 9:22.

The story presupposes that the infirmity has a spiritual cause, but there is some debate about the connection between sin and physical illness. Both Lapide and Archbishop McEvilly state that the main reason Jesus healed the man was "that He might show that diseases often arise, not so much from natural causes, as from sin. For He forgives the sins first, and then He heals the paralytic; showing that when the cause was taken away, the effect followed." Dale Allison notes that the text in 4QPrNab, a document among the Dead Sea Scrolls, shows that some Jews thought that a person could forgive someone's sins, with healing as the result.

== Notes ==
Preceded by Matthew 9:1	Gospel of Matthew; Chapter 9	Succeeded by Matthew 9:3
