= Matthew 9:4 =

- ← 9:3 9:5 →
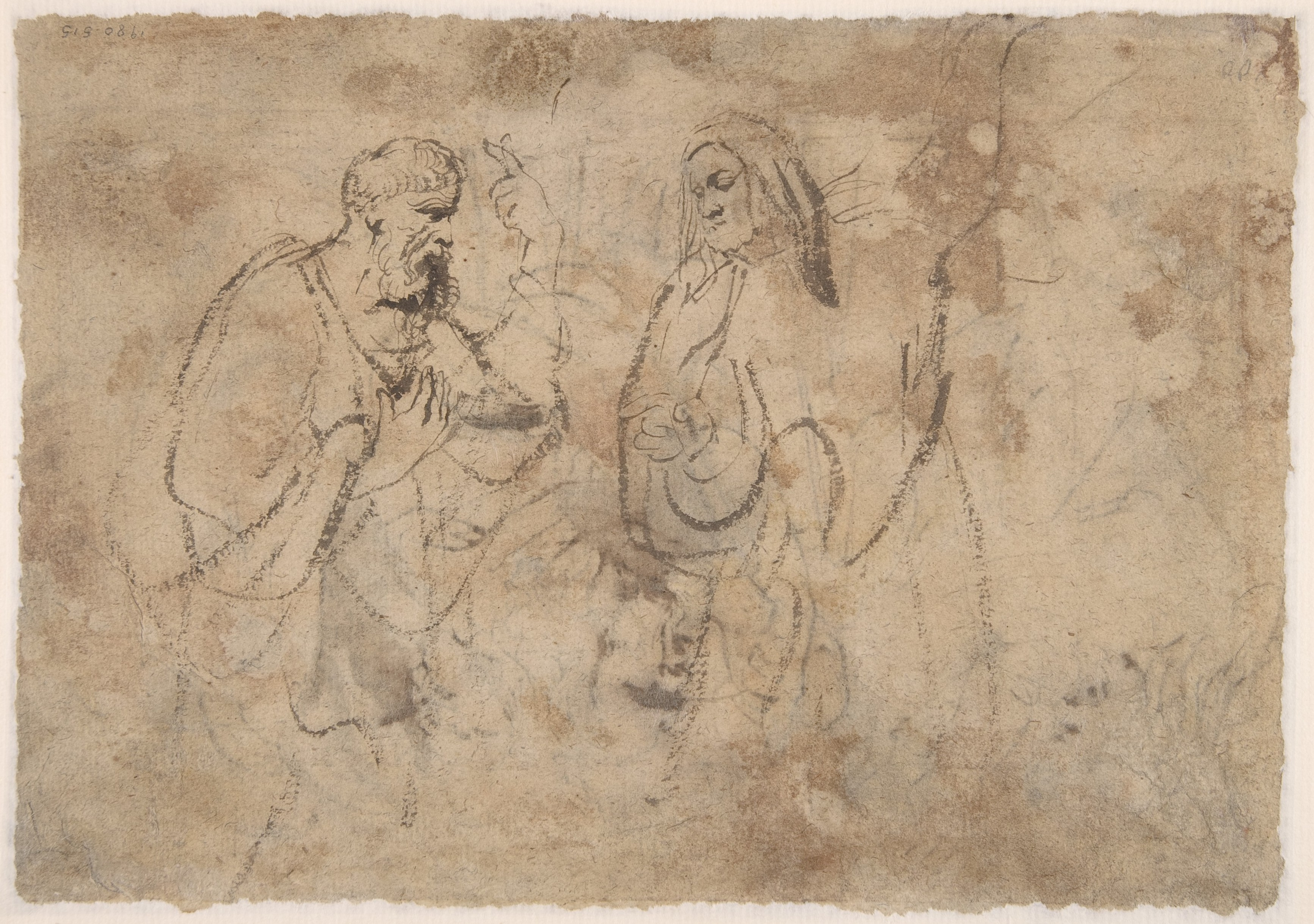
- "Christ and a Pharisee" by Anthony van Dyck (1599–1641); early 17th century
- Book: Gospel of Matthew
- Christian Bible part: New Testament

Matthew 9:4 is a verse in the ninth chapter of the Gospel of Matthew in the New Testament.

== Content ==
In the original Greek according to Westcott-Hort this verse is:

Καὶ ἰδὼν ὁ Ἰησοῦς τὰς ἐνθυμήσεις αὐτῶν εἶπεν, Ἵνα τί ὑμεῖς ἐνθυμεῖσθε πονηρὰ ἐν ταῖς καρδίαις ὑμῶν;

In the King James Version of the Bible the text reads:

And Jesus knowing their thoughts said, Wherefore think ye evil in your hearts?

The New International Version translates the passage as:

Knowing their thoughts, Jesus said, "Why do you entertain evil thoughts in your hearts?

== Analysis ==
"Jesus seeing their thoughts:" Witham points out that by showing that he knew their hidden thoughts, and by healing the man, which confirmed his words, he afforded them proof of his divine power. In Mark's gospel he adds that Jesus "knew in His Spirit." Lapide notes that, "this was not because another revealed to Him the thoughts and blasphemies of the Scribes, as the prophets knew such things, but by Himself and His own Spirit, pervading and penetrating all things."

Jesus reveals his divine nature by publicly exposing their thoughts, since the Bible repeatedly affirm that only God can know the secrets of hearts. See 1 Kings 8:39, "those heart You know (for You alone know the hearts of all the sons of men." Also, "I the LORD search the heart, I try the rein" (Jer. 17:10)

== Commentary from the Church Fathers ==
Chrysostom: Our Saviour, therefore, shews himself to be equal to his Father, by thus revealing to all, the malicious murmurs of his enemies, who for fear of the multitude, dared not to publish themselves what their wicked hearts devised.... If thou art incredulous about my power of remitting sin, behold I exercise another, whilst I lay open thy interior.

Preceded by Matthew 9:3	Gospel of Matthew; Chapter 9	Succeeded by Matthew 9:5
