= Matthew 9:24 =

- ← 9:23 9:25 →
- Book: Gospel of Matthew
- Christian Bible part: New Testament

Matthew 9:24 is a verse in the ninth chapter of the Gospel of Matthew in the New Testament.

== Content ==
In the original Greek according to Westcott-Hort for this verse is:

λέγει αὐτοῖς, Ἀναχωρεῖτε· οὐ γὰρ ἀπέθανε τὸ κοράσιον, ἀλλὰ καθεύδει. Καὶ κατεγέλων αὐτοῦ.

In the King James Version of the Bible the text reads:

He said unto them, Give place: for the maid is not dead, but sleepeth. And they laughed him to scorn.

The New International Version translates the passage as:

he said, "Go away. The girl is not dead but asleep." But they laughed at him.

== Analysis ==
Although the girl was dead (see v. 18), Jesus said that she was sleeping. Lapide gives several reasons for this response: 1) To God and to Jesus, all things live, and so she was not dead, and would be raised again at the Judgment Day. Therefore, the dead are regularly said to be sleeping in Scripture. 2) The girl was not dead in an altogether and absolutely sense, since she could be recalled to life, which was shortly about to be done. In such a sense, she was merely sleeping for a little while. Jesus also spoke of Lazarus as sleeping while he was dead.

== Commentary from the Church Fathers ==
Chrysostom: "But Christ put forth all the pipers, but took in the parents, that it might not be said that He had healed her by any other means; and before the restoring to life He excites their expectations by His words, And he said, Give place: for the maid is not dead, but sleepeth."

Bede: " As though He had said, To you she is dead, but to God who has power to give life, she sleeps only both in soul and body."

Chrysostom: "By this saying, He soothes the minds of those that were present, and shows that it is easy to Him to raise the dead; the like He did in the case of Lazarus, Our friend Lazarus sleepeth. (John 11:11.) This was also a lesson to them not to be afraid of death; forasmuch as He Himself also should die, He made His disciples learn in the persons of others confidence and patient endurance of death. For when He was near, death was but as sleep. When He had said this, They mocked him. And He did not rebuke their mocking; that this mocking, and the pipes and all other things, might be a proof of her death. For ofttimes at His miracles when men would not believe, He convicted them by their own answers; as in the case of Lazarus, when He said, Where have ye laid him? so that they that answered, Come and see, and, He stinketh, for he hath now been dead four days, could no longer disbelieve that He had raised a dead man."

Preceded by Matthew 9:23	Gospel of Matthew; Chapter 9	Succeeded by Matthew 9:25
