= Matthew 9:25 =

- ← 9:24 9:26 →
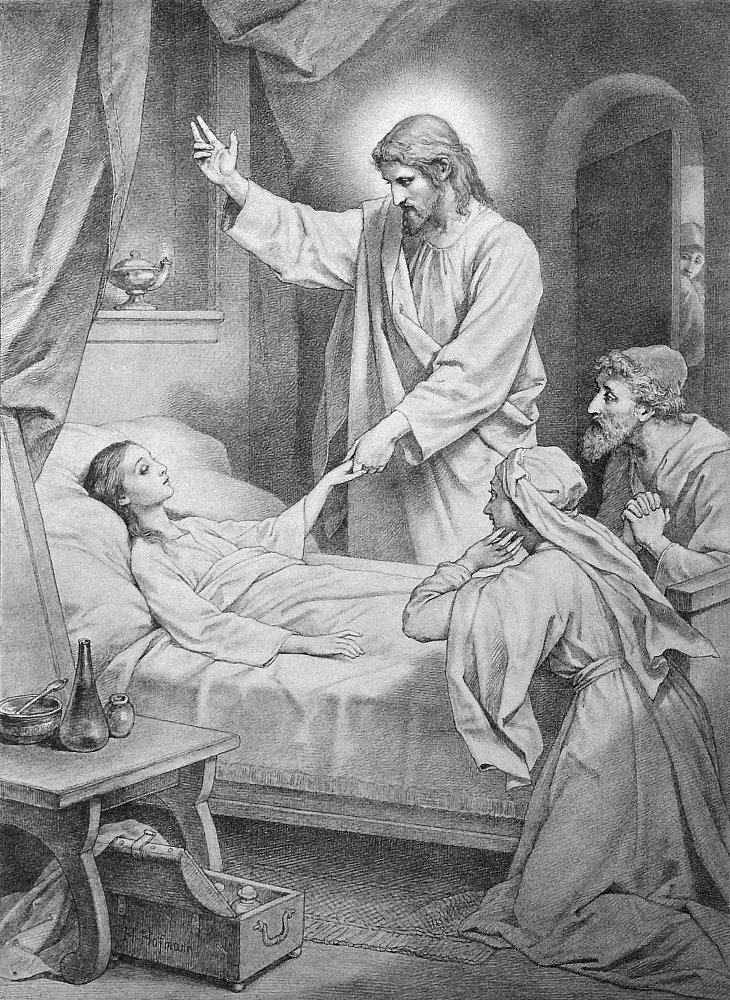
- "The raising of the daughter of Jairus", by Heinrich Hofmann 1893
- Book: Gospel of Matthew
- Christian Bible part: New Testament

Matthew 9:25 is the 25th verse in the ninth chapter of the Gospel of Matthew in the New Testament.

== Content ==
In the original Greek according to Westcott-Hort for this verse is:

Ὅτε δὲ ἐξεβλήθη ὁ ὄχλος, εἰσελθὼν ἐκράτησε τῆς χειρὸς αὐτῆς, καὶ ἠγέρθη τὸ κοράσιον.

In the King James Version of the Bible the text reads:

But when the people were put forth, he went in, and took her by the hand, and the maid arose.

The New International Version translates the passage as:

After the crowd had been put outside, he went in and took the girl by the hand, and she got up.

== Analysis ==
When "he went in," St. Mark says that Jesus took her parents, and Peter, James, and John. According to Lapide, Jesus dismissed the crowd because they were not worthy to be there. St. Gregory says, “That the dead soul may arise, the multitude of worldly cares must be cast out of the heart.” The Greek word ἐκράτησε ("took", her hand), has a sense of strength in it, which some would say points to the power of Christ. MacEvilly notes on the words "the maid arose": Christ raised her to life "as easily as if He were waking one who was asleep."

== Commentary from the Church Fathers ==
Jerome: "They that had mocked the Reviver were not worthy to behold the mystery of the revival; and therefore it follows, And when the multitude was put forth, he entered, and took her by the hand, and the maid arose."

Chrysostom: "He restored her to life not by bringing in another soul, but by recalling that which had departed, and as it were raising it from sleep, and through this sight preparing the way for belief of the resurrection. And He not only restores her to life, but commands food to be given her, as the other Evangelists relate, that that which was done might be seen to be no delusion. And the fame of him went abroad into all that country."

Glossa Ordinaria: "The fame, namely, of the greatness and novelty of the miracle, and its established truth; so that it could not be supposed to be a forgery."

Hilary of Poitiers: "Mystically; The Lord enters the ruler’s house, that is, the synagogue, throughout which there resounded in the songs of the Law a strain of wailing."

Jerome: "To this day the damsel lays dead in the ruler’s house; and they that seem to be teachers are but minstrels singing funeral dirges. The Jews also are not the crowd of believers, but of people making a noise. But when the fulness of the Gentiles shall come in, then all Israel shall be saved."

Hilary of Poitiers: "But that the number of the elect might be known to be but few out of the whole body of believers, the multitude is put forth; the Lord indeed would that they should be saved, but they mocked at His sayings and actions, and so were not worthy to be made partakers of His resurrection."

Jerome: "He took her by the hand, and the maid arose; because if the hands of the Jews which are defiled with blood be not first cleansed, their synagogue which is dead shall not revive."

Rabanus Maurus: "Morally; The damsel dead in the house is the soul dead in thought. He says that she is asleep, because they that are now asleep in sin may yet be roused by penitence. The minstrels are flatterers who cherish the dead."

Gregory the Great: "The multitude are put forth that the damsel may be raised; for unless the multitude of worldly cares is first banished from the secrets of the heart, the soul which is laid dead within, cannot rise again."

Rabanus Maurus: "The maiden is raised in the house with few to witness, the young man without the gate, and Lazarus in the presence of many; for a public scandal requires a public expiation; a less notorious, a lesser remedy; and secret sins may be done away by penitence."

Preceded by Matthew 9:24	Gospel of Matthew; Chapter 9	Succeeded by Matthew 9:26
