= Matthew 8:33 =

- ← 8:32 8:34 →
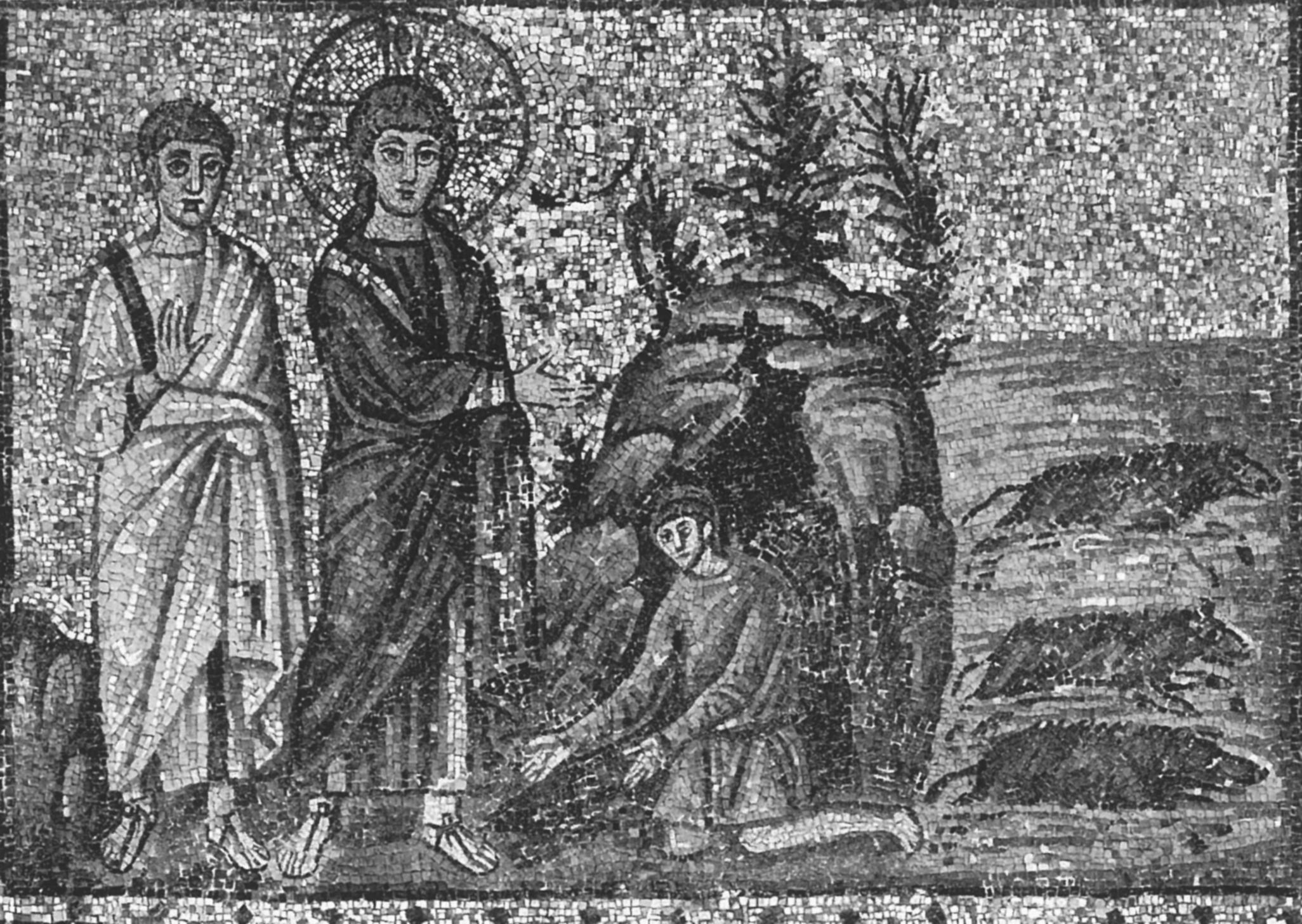
- Christ exorcising demons. Fifth century mosaic at Basilica of Sant'Apollinare Nuovo, Ravenna, Italy.
- Book: Gospel of Matthew
- Christian Bible part: New Testament

Matthew 8:33 is the 33rd verse in the eighth chapter of the Gospel of Matthew in the New Testament.

== Content ==
In the original Greek according to Westcott-Hort, Textus Receptus and Byzantine Majority, this verse is:

Οἱ δὲ βόσκοντες ἔφυγον, καὶ ἀπελθόντες εἰς τὴν πόλιν ἀπήγγειλαν πάντα, καὶ τὰ τῶν δαιμονιζομένων.

In the King James Version of the Bible the text reads:

And they that kept them fled, and went their ways into the city, and told every thing, and what was befallen to the possessed of the devils.

The New International Version translates the passage as:

Those tending the pigs ran off, went into the town and reported all this, including what had happened to the demon-possessed men.

For a collection of other versions see BibleHub Matthew 8:33.

== Analysis ==
This verse is a part of the narrative to show Jesus' authority and his relationship to the Gentiles (cf. Matthew 8:5–13). The location in the Decapolis and the fact that swine are being raised nearby indicate a non-Jewish area, along the east coast of the Sea of Galilee, where the population was mixed. The parallel verses (Mark 5:14 and Luke 8:34) mention that the news was also spread outside the city in the countryside. The swine herds ran to report what had happened to their masters and to everybody they met along the way.

== Sources ==
- Allison, Dale C. Jr. (2007). "57. Matthew". In Barton, John; Muddiman, John (eds.). The Oxford Bible Commentary (first (paperback) ed.). Oxford University Press. pp. 844–886. ISBN 978-0-19-927718-6.
- Coogan, Michael David (2007). Coogan, Michael David; Brettler, Marc Zvi; Newsom, Carol Ann; Perkins, Pheme (eds.). The New Oxford Annotated Bible with the Apocryphal/Deuterocanonical Books: New Revised Standard Version, Issue 48 (Augmented 3rd ed.). Oxford University Press. ISBN 978-0-19-528881-0.

Preceded by Matthew 8:32	Gospel of Matthew; Chapter 8	Succeeded by Matthew 8:34
