= Matthew 8:34 =

- ← 8:33 9:1 →
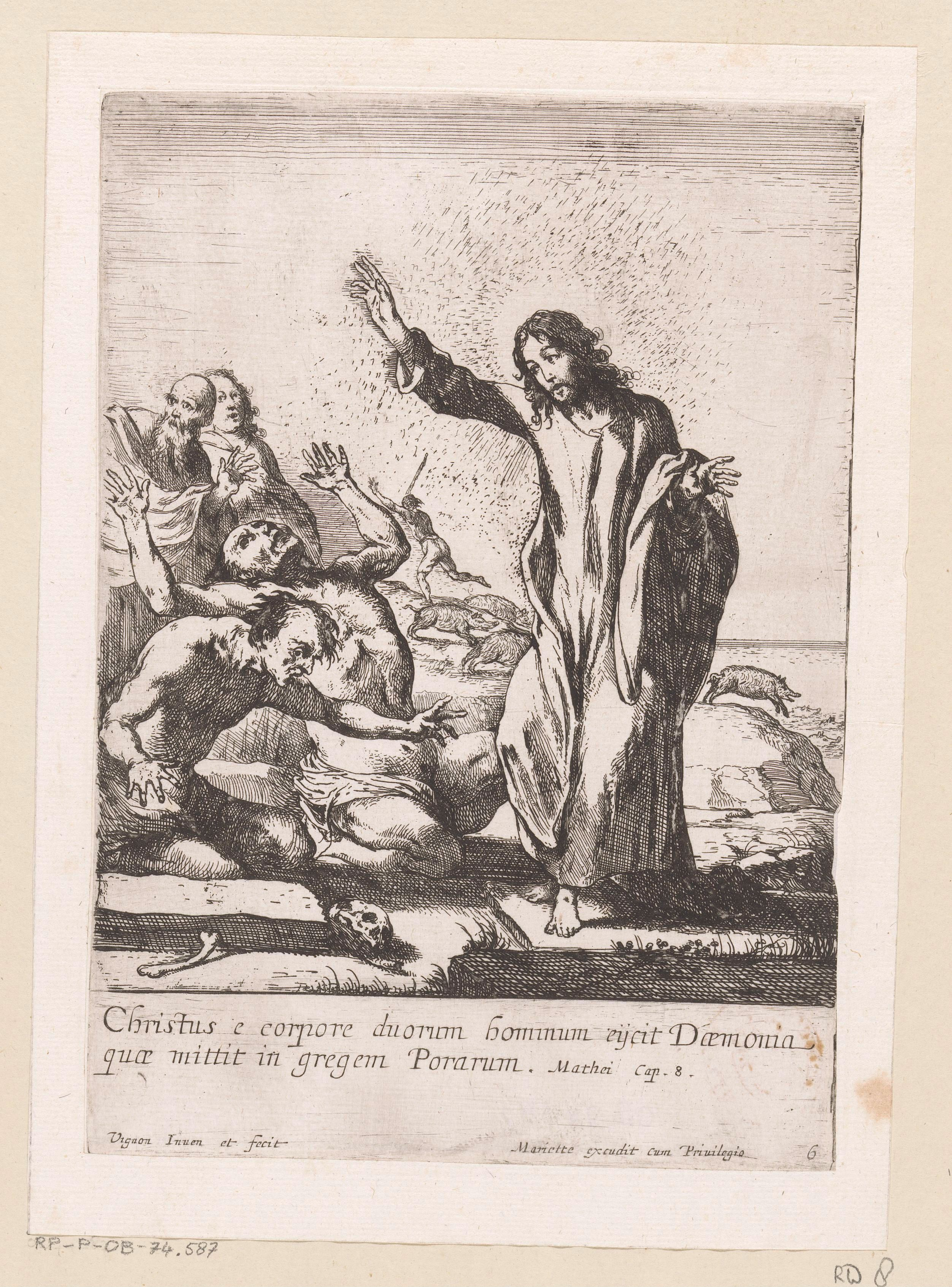
- "Christ heals two possessed men" in Miracula Domini Nostri Jesu Christi. Illustration by Charles Delorme (1638–1643).
- Book: Gospel of Matthew
- Christian Bible part: New Testament

Matthew 8:34 is a verse in the eighth chapter of the Gospel of Matthew in the New Testament.

== Content ==
In the original Greek according to Westcott-Hort this verse is:

Καὶ ἰδού, πᾶσα ἡ πόλις ἐξῆλθεν εἰς συνάντησιν τῷ Ἰησοῦ· καὶ ἰδόντες αὐτόν, παρεκάλεσαν ὅπως μεταβῇ ἀπὸ τῶν ὁρίων αὐτῶν.

In the King James Version of the Bible the text reads:

And, behold, the whole city came out to meet Jesus: and when they saw him, they besought him that he would depart out of their coasts.

The New International Version translates the passage as:

Then the whole town went out to meet Jesus. And when they saw him, they pleaded with him to leave their region.

For a collection of other versions see BibleHub Matthew 8:34.

== Analysis ==
St. Jerome believes these people acted this way from humility, thinking themselves unworthy of his presence. According to Witham others seeing the loss of the swine were afraid, "lest Christ, being a Jew, might do them greater damages."

== Commentary from the Church Fathers ==
Hilary of Poitiers: "By their coming forth to meet Him is signified the willingness of men flocking to the faith. The dæmons seeing that there is no longer any place left for them among the Gentiles, pray that they may be suffered to dwell among the heretics; these, seized by them, are drowned in the sea, that is, in worldly desires, by the instigations of the dæmons, and perish in the unbelief of the rest of the Gentiles."

Bede: "Or; The swine are they that delight in filthy manners; for unless one live as a swine, the devils do not receive power over him; or at most, only to try him, not to destroy him. That the swine were sent headlong into the lake, signifies, that when the people of the Gentiles are delivered from the condemnation of the dæmons, yet still they who would not believe in Christ, perform their profane rites in secret, drowned in a blind and deep curiosity. That they that fed the swine, fled and told what was done, signifies that even the leaders of the wicked though they shun the law of Christianity, yet cease not to proclaim the wonderful power of Christ. When struck with terror, they entreat Him to depart from them, they signify a great number who, well satisfied with their ancient life, show themselves willing to honour the Christian law, while they declare themselves unable to perform it."

Hilary of Poitiers: "Or; The town is a type of the Jewish nation, which having heard of Christ’s works goes forth to meet its Lord, to forbid Him to approach their country and town; for they have not received the Gospel."

Preceded by Matthew 8:33	Gospel of Matthew; Chapter 8	Succeeded by Matthew 9:1
