= Matthew 9:8 =

- ← 9:7 9:9 →
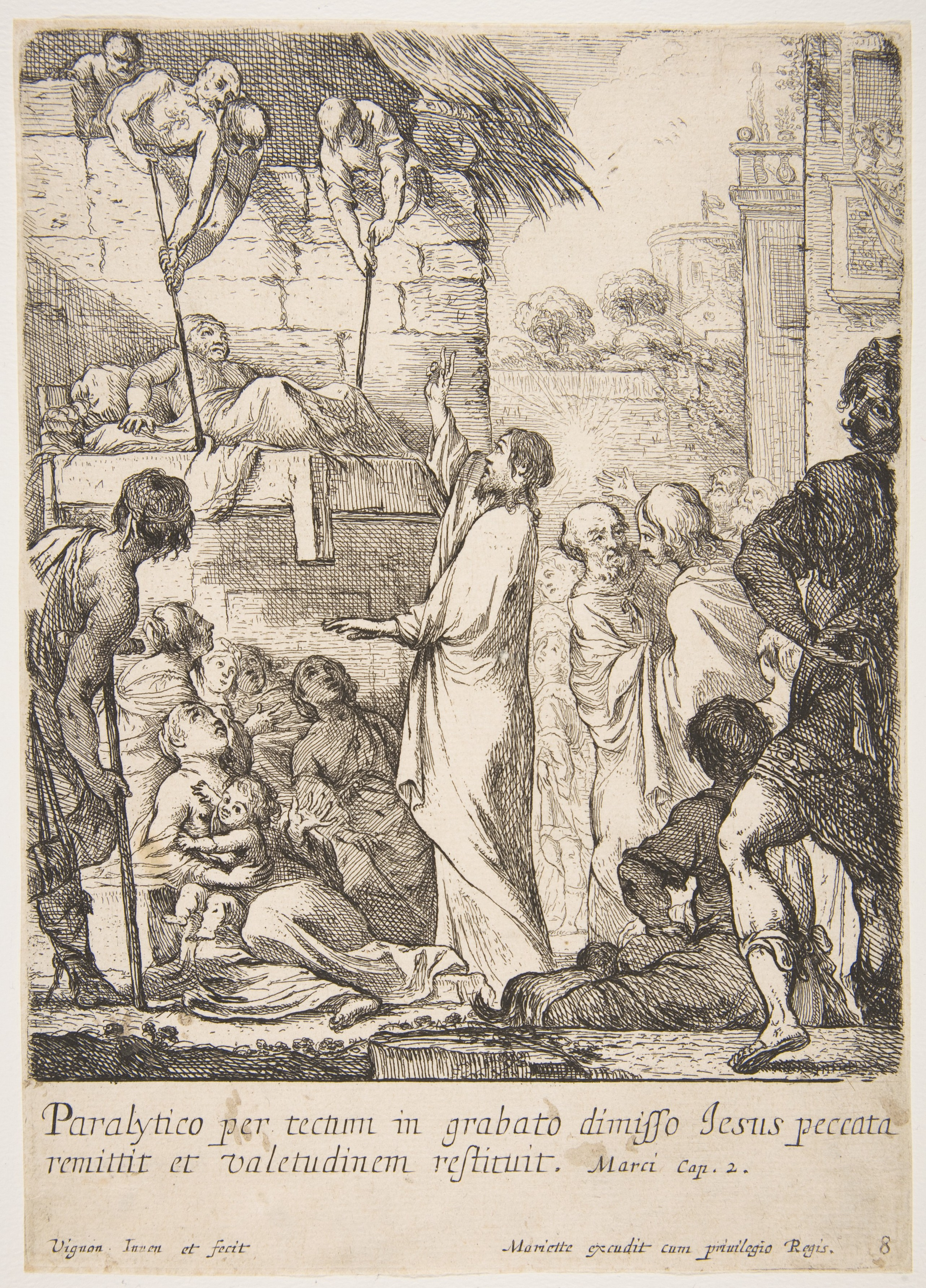
- Christ Healing the Paralytic, etched by Claude Vignon (1593–1670)
- Book: Gospel of Matthew
- Christian Bible part: New Testament

Matthew 9:8 is the eighth verse in the ninth chapter of the Gospel of Matthew in the New Testament.

== Content ==
In the original Greek according to Textus Receptus and Byzantine Majority, this verse is:

ἰδόντες δὲ οἱ ὄχλοι ἐθαύμασαν, καὶ ἐδόξασαν τὸν θεὸν τὸν δόντα ἐξουσίαν τοιαύτην τοῖς ἀνθρώποις

According to Westcott-Hort, the Greek text of this verse is:

Ἰδόντες δὲ οἱ ὄχλοι ἐφοβήθησαν καὶ ἐδόξασαν τὸν θεὸν τὸν δόντα ἐξουσίαν τοιαύτην τοῖς ἀνθρώποις.

In the King James Version of the Bible the text reads:

But when the multitudes saw it, they marvelled, and glorified God, which had given such power unto men.

The Holman Christian Standard Bible translates the passage as:

When the crowds saw this, they were awestruck and gave glory to God who had given such authority to men.

For a collection of other versions see BibleHub Matthew 9:8.

== Analysis ==
This verse records the reaction of the people who witnessed the miraculous healing of a paralytic man by Jesus, who before the healing declared the forgiveness of the man's sins, that they glorified God, who had given such divine "power" or "authority" to men. Dale Allison notes that a text in 4QPrNab, a document among the Dead Sea Scrolls, shows that some Jews think of one person who forgives another's sins with healing as the result.

The Greek text according to Westcott and Hort has ἐφοβήθησαν ("they were afraid"; cf. Mark 5:15 for a similar reaction of fear at miraculous events), a rather solely physical effect than the word ἐθαύμασαν ("they marvelled") of the Textus Receptus, which is more in agreement with words used in the parallel verses, Mark 2:12 ἐξίστασθαι πάντας ("they all were amazed") and Luke 5:26 ἔκστασις ἔλαβεν ἅπαντας ("they all were filled with fear"). Moreover, Mark 2:12 records the words the people said, "We never saw it after this fashion", whereas Luke 5:26 has "We saw strange things today". The variants of words here and in the parallel verses are likely attributed to various translations of the Aramaic or Hebrew traditions.

The event described here took place in Capernaum, where Jesus resided at the time (cf. Matthew 4:13).

== Sources ==
- Allison, Dale C. Jr. (2007). "57. Matthew". In Barton, John; Muddiman, John (eds.). The Oxford Bible Commentary (first (paperback) ed.). Oxford University Press. pp. 844–886. ISBN 978-0-19-927718-6.
- Coogan, Michael David (2007). Coogan, Michael David; Brettler, Marc Zvi; Newsom, Carol Ann; Perkins, Pheme (eds.). The New Oxford Annotated Bible with the Apocryphal/Deuterocanonical Books: New Revised Standard Version, Issue 48 (Augmented 3rd ed.). Oxford University Press. ISBN 978-0-19-528881-0.

Preceded by Matthew 9:7	Gospel of Matthew; Chapter 9	Succeeded by Matthew 9:9
