= Matthew 8:32 =

- ← 8:31 8:33 →
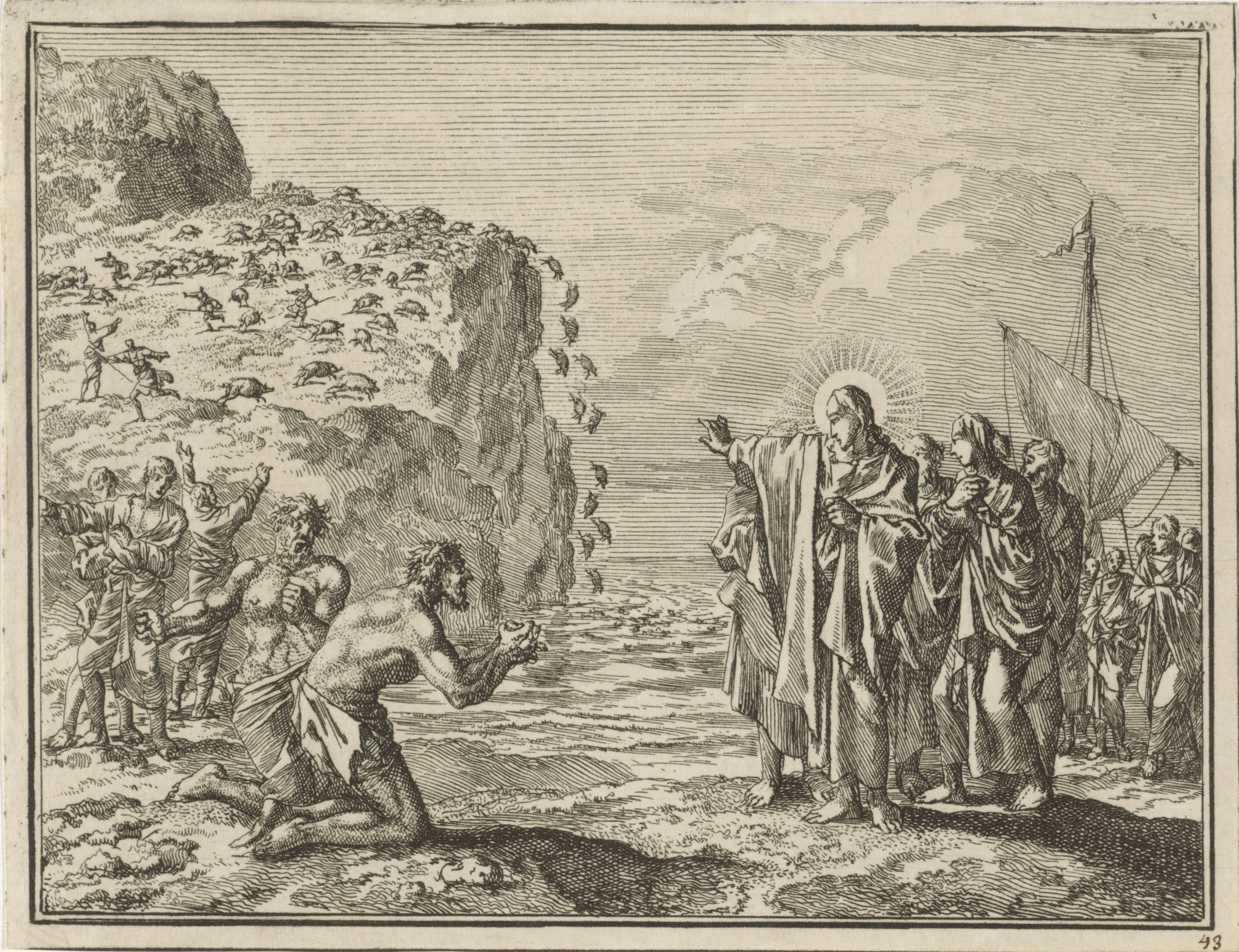
- Christ in the land of Gadarenes by Jan Luyken, 1712
- Book: Gospel of Matthew
- Christian Bible part: New Testament

Matthew 8:32 is the 32nd verse in the eighth chapter of the Gospel of Matthew in the New Testament.

== Content ==
In the original Greek according to Westcott-Hort this verse is:

"Καὶ εἶπεν αὐτοῖς, Ὑπάγετε. Οἱ δὲ ἐξελθόντες ἀπῆλθον εἰς τὴν ἀγέλην τῶν χοίρων· καὶ ἰδού, ὥρμησε πᾶσα ἡ ἀγέλη τῶν χοίρων κατὰ τοῦ κρημνοῦ εἰς τὴν θάλασσαν, καὶ ἀπέθανον ἐν τοῖς ὕδασιν."

In the King James Version of the Bible the text reads:

"And he said unto them, Go. And when they came out, they went into the herd of swine, and, behold, the whole herd of swine ran violently down a steep place into the sea, and perished in the waters."

The New International Version translates the passage as:

"He said to them, 'Go!' So they came out and went into the pigs, and the whole herd rushed down the steep bank into the lake and died in the water."

== Analysis ==
Cornelius a Lapide gives a number of reasons why Christ granted the request of the devils. First, to show that He had power over evil spirits, and that without his permission they could not even harm pigs, much less people. (Note: This point is discussed in the life of Anthony the Great.) Second, to show the number, strength, and ill-nature of the devils, and to show how much greater was his own power. Third, to disprove the error of the Sadducees, who said that there is "neither angel nor spirit" (Acts 23:8).

This moment fulfills the prophecy of the Messiah's power over evil, as seen in passages like Isaiah 61:1, which speaks of setting captives free. Water often represents chaos and judgment in biblical literature, as seen in the story of Noah's flood (Genesis 7) and the parting of the Red Sea (Exodus 14). The drowning of the pigs signifies the cleansing and purifying power of Jesus' intervention.

The demons' request to enter the pigs (as seen in the preceding verses) highlights their desire to inhabit a physical form. The choice of pigs is significant, as pigs were considered unclean animals according to Jewish law (Leviticus 11:7). This event takes place in a predominantly Gentile region, which explains the presence of a large herd of pigs. The transfer of demons from humans to animals underscores the destructive nature of demonic forces and the mercy of Jesus in liberating the men.

Lapide also puts forth a mystical meaning for this passage, saying that Christ did this to show that "all who, after the manner of swine wallow in fleshly lusts and pleasures, that they in like manner are rushing into the abyss of hell, and also to teach us that we must account the loss of our earthly possessions as of small account compared with the destruction of the soul. For He permitted the devils to enter into the herd of swine in order to free the demoniacs from their power."

== Commentary from the Church Fathers ==
Chrysostom: "Jesus did not say this, as though persuaded by the dæmons, but with many designs therein. One, that He might show the mighty power to hurt of these dæmons, who were in possession of the two men; another, that all might see that they had no power against the swine unless by His sufferance; thirdly, to show that they would have done more grievous hurt to the men, had they not even in their calamities been aided by Divine Providence, for they hate men more than irrational animals. By this it is manifest that there is no man who is not supported by Divine Providence; and if all are not equally supported by it, neither after one manner, this is the highest characteristic of Providence, that it is extended to each man according to his need. Besides the above-mentioned things, we learn also that He cares not only for the whole together, but for each one in particular; which one may see clearly in these dæmoniacs, who would have been long before choked in the deep, had not Divine care preserved them. He also permitted them to go into the herd of swine, that they that dwelt in those parts might know His power. For where He was known to none, there He makes His miracles to shine forth, that He may bring them to a confession of His divinity."

Jerome: "The Saviour bade them go, not as yielding to their request, but that by the death of the swine, an occasion of man's salvation might be offered. But they went out, (to wit, out of the men,) and went into the swine; and, lo, the whole herd rushed violently headlong into the sea, and perished in the waters. Let Manichæus blush; if the souls of men and of beasts be of one substance, and one origin, how should two thousand swine have perished for the sake of the salvation of two men?"

Chrysostom: "The dæmons destroyed the swine because they are ever striving to bring men into distress, and rejoice in destruction. The greatness of the loss also added to the fame of that which was done; for it was published by many persons; namely, by the men that were healed, by the owners of the swine, and by those that fed them; as it follows, But they that fed them fled, and went into the town, and told all, and concerning them that had the dæmons; and, behold, the whole town went out to meet Jesus. But when they should have adored Him, and wondered at His excellent power, they cast Him from them, as it follows, And when they saw him, they besought him that he would depart out of their coasts. Observe the clemency of Christ next to His excellent power; when those who had received favours from Him would drive Him away, He resisted not, but departed, and left those who thus pronounced themselves unworthy of His teaching, giving them as teachers those who had been delivered from the dæmons, and the feeders of the swine."

Jerome: "Otherwise; This request may have proceeded from humility as well as pride; like Peter, they may have held themselves unworthy of the Lord's presence, Depart from me, for I am a sinful man, O Lord. (Luke 5:8.)"

Rabanus Maurus: "Gerasa is interpreted 'casting out the dweller,' or, 'a stranger approaching;' this is the Gentile world which cast out the Devil from it; and which was first far off, but now made near, after the resurrection being visited by Christ through His preachers."

Ambrose: "The two dæmoniacs are also a type of the Gentile world; for Noah having three sons, Shem, Ham, and Japhet, Shem's posterity alone was taken into the inheritance of God, while from the other two sprang the nations of the Gentiles."

Hilary of Poitiers: "Thus the dæmons held the two men among the tombs without the town, that is, without the synagogue of the Law and the Prophets; that is, they infested the original seats of the two nations, the abodes of the dead, making the way of this present life dangerous to the passers by."

Rabanus Maurus: "It is not without cause that he speaks of them as dwelling among the tombs; for what else are the bodies of the faithless but sepulchres of the dead, in which the word of God dwells not, but there is enclosed the soul dead in sins. He says, So that no man might pass through that way, because before the coming of the Saviour the Gentile world was inaccessible. Or, by the two, understand both Jews and Gentiles, who did not abide in the house, that is, did not rest in their conscience. But they abode in tombs, that is, delighted themselves in dead works, and suffered no man to pass by the way of faith, which way the Jews obstructed."

== Notes ==
Preceded by Matthew 8:31	Gospel of Matthew; Chapter 8	Succeeded by Matthew 8:33
