= Matthew 9:22 =

- ← 9:21 9:23 →
- Book: Gospel of Matthew
- Christian Bible part: New Testament

Matthew 9:22 is a verse in the ninth chapter of the Gospel of Matthew in the New Testament.

== Content ==
In the original Greek according to Westcott-Hort, this verse is:

Ὁ δὲ Ἰησοῦς ἐπιστραφεὶς καὶ ἰδὼν αὐτὴν εἶπε, Θάρσει, θύγατερ· ἡ πίστις σου σέσωκέ σε. Καὶ ἐσώθη ἡ γυνὴ ἀπὸ τῆς ὥρας ἐκείνης.

In the King James Version of the Bible the text reads:

But Jesus turned him about, and when he saw her, he said, Daughter, be of good comfort; thy faith hath made thee whole. And the woman was made whole from that hour.

The New International Version translates the passage as:

Jesus turned and saw her. "Take heart, daughter," he said, "your faith has healed you." And the woman was healed from that moment.

== Analysis ==
Robert Witham states that the woman's faith is seen as the cause of the healing, in that she believed that by touching his garment she might be saved. Witham also notes that Jesus turns about and looks, as if he were ignorant and wanted to see who touched him. From the various gospel accounts, it is not clear whether she was healed upon Jesus' words or from the moment when she touched his garment. Pope Francis notes a parallel between the words "Take heart, son!" in Matthew 9:2 and "Take heart, daughter!" in this verse.

Preceded by Matthew 9:21	Gospel of Matthew; Chapter 9	Succeeded by Matthew 9:23
