= Matthew 9:1 =

- ← 8:34 9:2 →
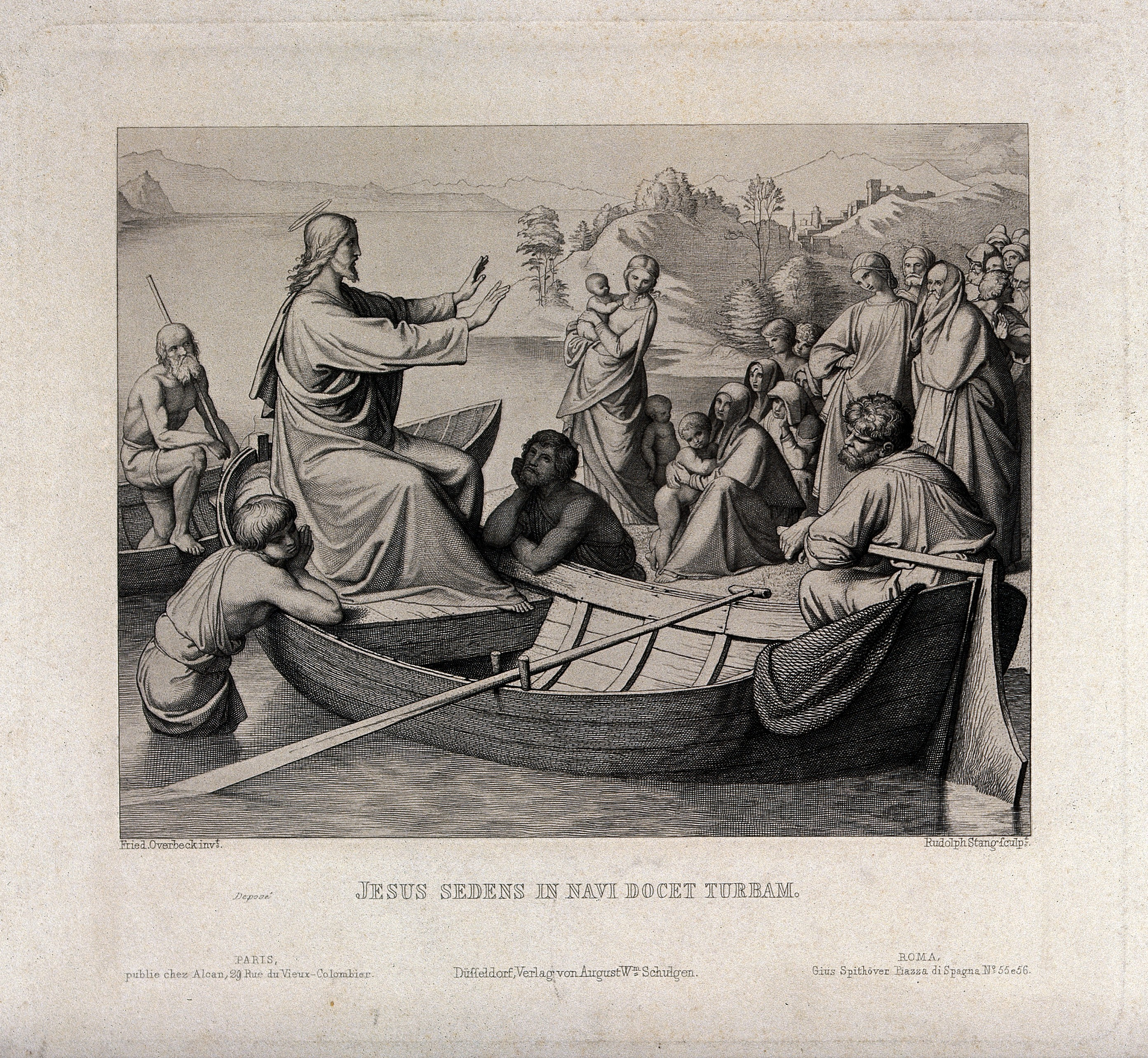
- "Christ, seated in a boat, pacifies the crowds on the shore". Etching by Rudolf Stang after J. F. Overbeck.
- Book: Gospel of Matthew
- Christian Bible part: New Testament

Matthew 9:1 is the first verse in the ninth chapter of the Gospel of Matthew in the New Testament.

== Content ==
In the original Greek according to Westcott-Hort this verse is:

Καὶ ἐμβὰς εἰς τὸ πλοῖον διεπέρασε καὶ ἦλθεν εἰς τὴν ἰδίαν πόλιν.

In the King James Version of the Bible, the text reads:

And he entered into a ship, and passed over, and came into his own city.

The New International Version translates the passage as:

Jesus stepped into a boat, crossed over and came to his own town.

== Analysis ==
There is a variety of opinions as to which was Jesus' "own town". Theologians Arthur Carr and Dale Allison refer to Capernaum, which is located on the northwest shore of the Sea of Galilee. Henricus Sedulius believes that Bethlehem is meant, since he was born there. St. Jerome understands it to be Nazareth, because Jesus was brought up there. Most other church fathers (see below) believe it is Capernaum, in which Christ often dwelt (see Matthew 4:13).

== Commentary from the Church Fathers ==
Chrysostom: "By his own city is here meant Capharnaum. For one town, to wit, Bethlehem, had received Him to be born there; another had brought Him up, to wit, Nazareth; and a third received Him to dwell there continually, namely, Capharnaum."

Augustine: "That Matthew here speaks of his own city, and Mark calls it Capharnaum, would be more difficult to be reconciled if Matthew had expressed it Nazareth. But as it is, all Galilee might be called Christ’s city, because Nazareth was in Galilee; just as all the Roman empire, divided into many states, was still called the Roman city. Who can doubt then that the Lord in coming to Galilee is rightly said to come into his own city, whatever was the town in which He abode, especially since Capharnaum was exalted into the metropolis of Galilee?"

Augustine: "And if we adopt this supposition, we must say that Matthew has omitted all that was done from the time that Jesus entered into His own city till He came to Capharnaum, and has proceeded on at once to the healing of the paralytic; as in many other places they pass over things that intervened, and carry on the thread of the narrative, without noticing any interval of time, to something else; so here, And, lo, they bring unto him a paralytic laying on a bed."

Jerome: "Or; This city may be no other than Nazareth, whence He was called a Nazarene."

Preceded by Matthew 8:34	Gospel of Matthew; Chapter 9	Succeeded by Matthew 9:2
