= Mark 2 =

- ← Mark 1 Mark 3 →
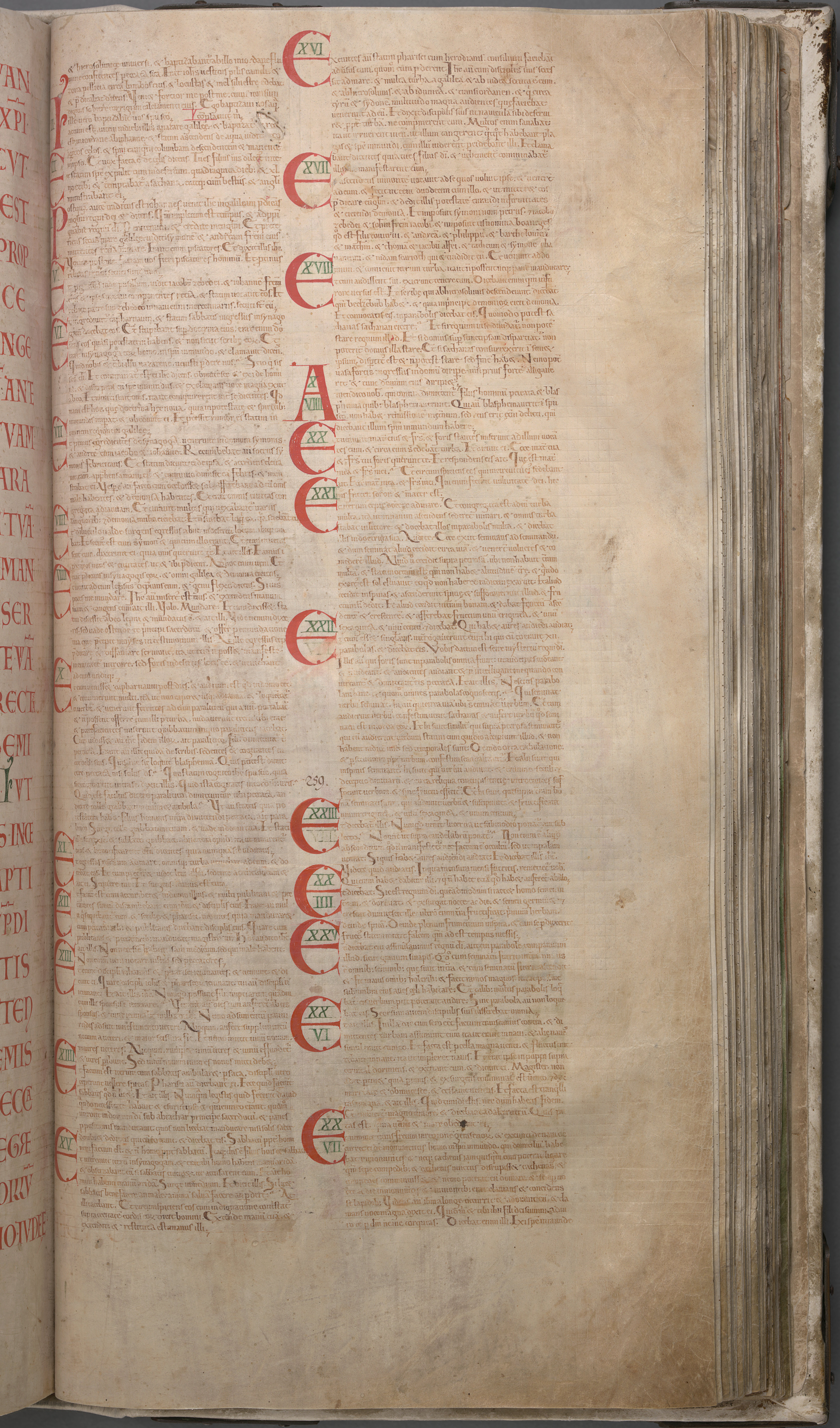
- The Latin text of Mark 1:5–5:8 in Codex Gigas (13th century)
- Book: Gospel of Mark
- Category: Gospel
- Christian Bible part: New Testament
- Order in the Christian part: 2

Mark 2 is the second chapter of the Gospel of Mark in the New Testament of the Christian Bible. In this chapter, the first arguments between Jesus and other Jewish religious teachers appear. Jesus heals a paralyzed man and forgives his sins, meets with the disreputable Levi and his friends, and argues over the need to fast, and whether or not one can harvest food on Sabbath.

== Text ==
The original text was written in Koine Greek. This chapter is divided into 28 verses.

=== Textual witnesses ===
Some early manuscripts containing the complete text of this chapter are:

- Codex Vaticanus (325–350)
- Codex Sinaiticus (330–360)
- Codex Bezae (~400)
- Codex Alexandrinus (400–440)
- Codex Ephraemi Rescriptus (~450)

== Critical scholarship ==
Several writers treat Mark 2:1–3:6 as a single unit for analytical purposes. Joseph Mali refers to these verses as containing the "Galilean Conflict Stories", whilst noting that there is no scholarly consensus in this field. He notes "Markan Public Debates" and "controversy dialogues" as other terms which have been used to cover these verses. The Jerusalem Bible refers to the "Five Disputes" set out in these verses. Vincent Taylor suggests that this passage may have existed "as a connected whole" before the gospel was compiled. Johannes Weiss sees its function as establishing "why Jesus' opponents hated [him] and pursued him to death".

== Jesus heals a paralyzed man ==
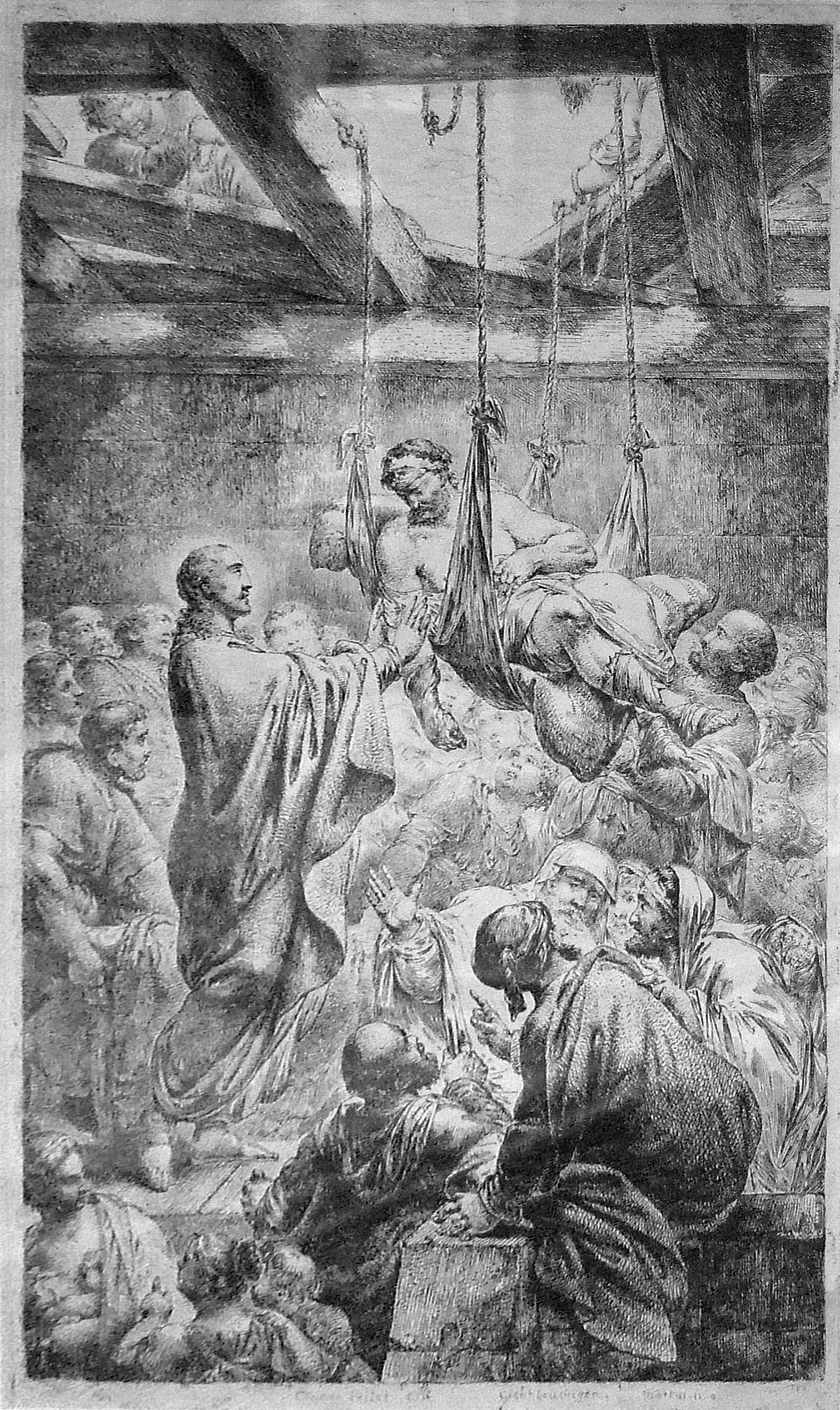
"Christ Heals a Man Paralyzed by the Gout". Mark 2:4. Engraving by Bernhard Rode, 1780.

Jesus returns to Capernaum after a period of absence in the open country (Mark 1:35–45). Verse 1 of this chapter sees him "in the house" (Greek: εν οικω, en oikō). Some translations state that Jesus was "at home". Tom Wright notes that "most people don't realize that this was probably Jesus' own house", although it may have been Peter's house.

Four men carrying a paralyzed man come to see Jesus, but they cannot get past the crowd. Mark is the only canonical gospel to specify that there were four persons carrying him. It is not stated who the men are, but it is implied that they have faith in Jesus, or in God's working through him. Since Mark has so far listed four disciples, some writers speculate that Mark might be indicating it is them doing the carrying, but there is no general agreement on this.

These four men create a hole in the roof of the house (Greek: ἀπεστέγασαν τὴν στέγην, apestegasan tēn stegēn, "they uncovered the roof") and lower the man in to see Jesus. Kilgallen suggests that because they "dug" through the roof this indicates that it is a poor house, with the roof made of leaves, bark, and dirt. It might also have had wooden beams for more sturdy support. This was the ordinary type of house in Judea at the time. Longman, Strauss and Taylor's Expanded Bible states "they dug a hole in the roof" and notes that Judean "roofs were generally flat and made of thatch and dried mud" and The Living Bible refers to a "clay roof". Jesus is impressed by their effort, praising all the men's faith, and he tells the paralytic that his sins are forgiven. Theophylact includes the paralytic as a person of faith: otherwise he would not have allowed himself to be carried up onto the roof of the house. It has also been argued, to the contrary, that Jesus "did not mean the faith of the sick man, but of his bearers" (Pseudo-Chrysostom). Jerome and Ambrose exclude the paralytic himself from the commended faith, but John Chrysostom includes him. Wright suggests that the forgiveness is granted in part for creating a hole in the roof of Jesus' house, but also that the forgiveness Jesus granted "went deeper" than this. Jesus calls the man "Son" or "my child", a term of affection.

Some of the teachers of the law present (belonging to the sect of the Pharisees) are disturbed by this. "Why does this fellow talk like that? He's blaspheming! Who can forgive sins but God alone?" (2:7). Mark observes that Jesus "... knew in his spirit that this was what they were thinking in their hearts..." (2:8).

He says to them "Why are you thinking these things? Which is easier: to say to the paralytic, 'Your sins are forgiven', or to say, 'Get up, take your mat and walk'? But that you may know that the Son of Man has authority on earth to forgive sins ..." He says to the man "...get up, take your mat and go home." (8–11).

According to Raymond E. Brown, it may have been easier to tell the man something than to demand he get up and walk. Jesus chooses to prove his ability to forgive sins, with a demonstration of the man's ability to walk. He forgives and heals by word alone, highlighting the power of his words. Mark says that "everyone" was amazed by this.

Jesus refers to himself as the Son of Man, ho huios tou anthrōpou (literally son of the human being), which he does many times in Mark. This is taken in several ways in Mark, but is a term accepted by orthodox Christianity as referring to his Messiahship. The term is found in other Jewish sources, for example Daniel 7:31 and the Book of Enoch. In the Jewish apocalyptic tradition, this title represents the judge during the final judgement. He was often viewed as angelic or as a heavenly being who comes as a flesh and blood person. Only Jesus mentions this title in the Gospels, often using it to speak about himself in the third person. It has also been seen as symbolic of God's plan for all people.

In both Luke 13:1–5 and John 9:2–3 Jesus rejects the notion that illness and misfortune are the result of sins.

The teachers say that only God can forgive one's sins; some see Exodus 34:6–7 and Isaiah 43:25 and 44:22 as proof of this claim. Mark thus leaves it implied that Jesus is God and that faith in his power can lead to not just a cure of physical ills but to a forgiveness of a person's sins. Early Christians may have used this story to buttress their claims of Jesus' ability to forgive sins. Thus to the teachers Jesus' claim is blasphemy as they do not think Jesus is God, but to Mark's audience this confirms their belief in Jesus' divinity.

This is the first conflict between Jesus and other Jewish teachers in Mark. Mark might be starting his explanation of why these Jewish authorities later turned on Jesus.

This incident of the cure of a paralytic and his subsequent forgiveness of his sins is told in all the Synoptic Gospels, (Luke 5:17–26 and Matthew 9:1–8). All the synoptics agree that the man was paralyzed and that the teachers of the law were incensed at Jesus because he said he could forgive the man's sins.

== Calling of Levi ==
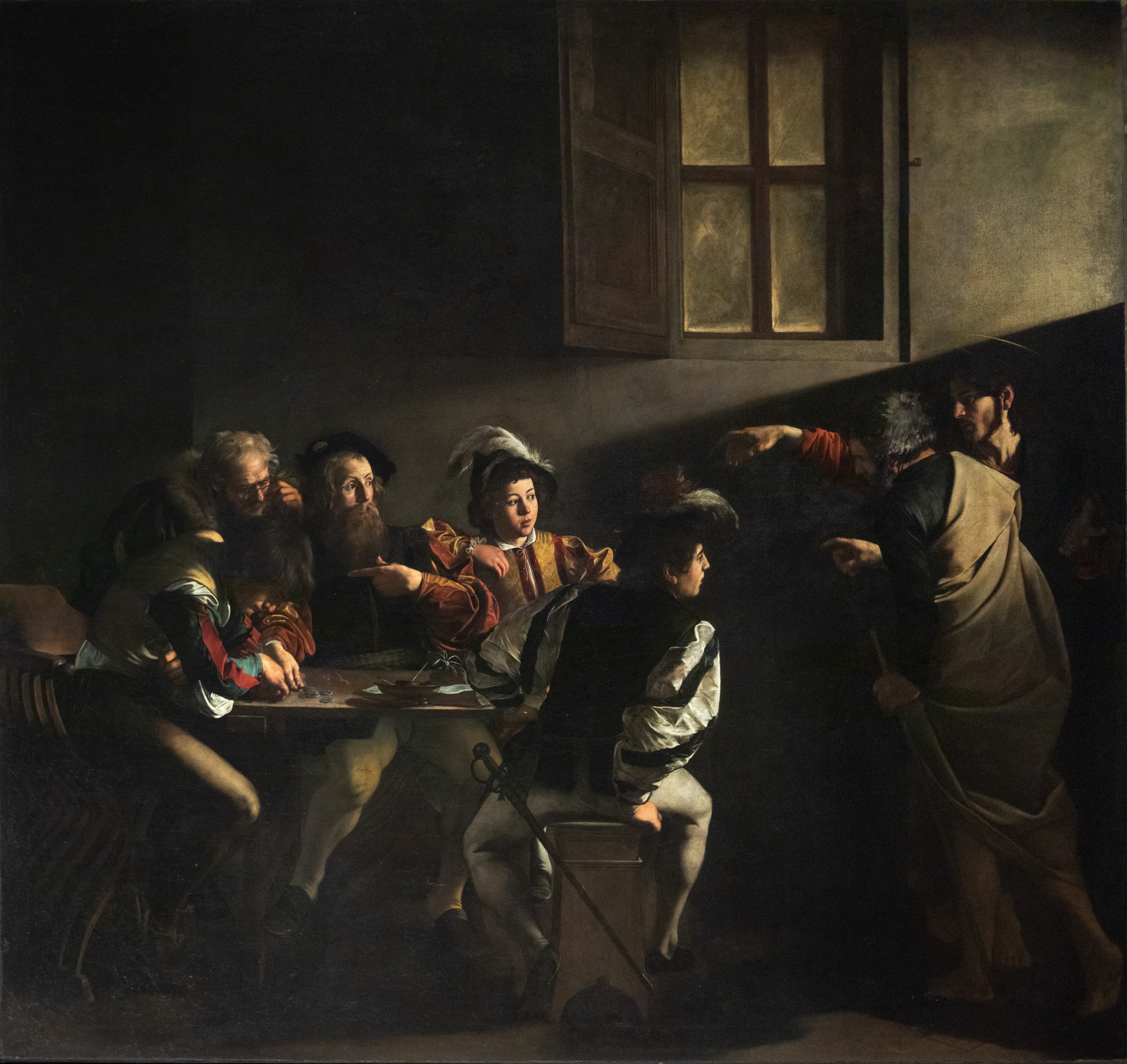
The Calling of Saint Matthew by Caravaggio

Jesus, while teaching a large crowd by the lake, finds Levi at the tax collector's booth and says "Follow me!" Luke 5:27–29 also calls him "Levi". Matthew's version of this story clearly lists him as "Matthew", the tax collector and apostle, in 9:9,10:3. Mark lists him as Levi the son of Alphaeus, although an Alphaeus is also listed as the name of the father of James. A few manuscripts refer to James and not Levi, but most think this is an attempt by a copyist at correction. J.E. Jacquier suggests that Levi was his name originally, and that it is probable that Mattija, "gift of Iaveh", was the name conferred upon the tax-gatherer by Jesus when He called him to the Apostolate. maybe a middle or nickname, and both fathers had the same name. Mark names Matthew but Levi as one of the Twelve Apostles in 3:16–19, so if one considers Mark alone it is not clear this Levi was an Apostle.

A tax collector could mean two things. He could have been an independent contractor working for the Roman government, who paid a fee to Rome to obtain the right to extract taxes from the people in a certain area, with an added fee for the collector and his employees. He might have also been a toll collector for Herod Antipas, and Capernaum was an area with a high traffic of people and merchants. Either way, Levi would have been a very unpopular and even despised person.

Jesus and his disciples eat "at his house" (Greek: ἐν τῇ οἰκίᾳ αὐτοῦ, en tē oikia autou) with Levi and his disreputable friends and the "teachers of the law who were Pharisees" (2:16) ask his disciples why. Some ancient authorities put the question as "why does he eat and drink" with them. The house is generally understood to have been Levi's, but the text is not certain, and Nicoll refers to a suggestion that "Jesus, not Matthew, was the real host at the social gathering": the "call" to sinners can be read as an "invitation", just as a host might invite guests to a meal.

Teaching the law was a profession, and the Pharisees were a group of men who were considered pious. Whether they were at the dinner or were simply aware of it is unclear. The proper preparing and eating of food are very important in Judaism. It was even considered dangerous to eat with those who did not observe the same dining customs by some Jews like the Pharisees. See also the "Incident at Antioch" Gal 2:11–21.

Jesus replies the famous "It is not the healthy who need a doctor, but the sick. I have not come to call the righteous, but sinners." Matthew has him say "But go and learn what this means: 'I desire mercy, not sacrifice'" between the two sentences in Mark's version. Luke says "... but sinners to repentance". Jesus compares himself to a doctor to show that, as a doctor fights disease by working with the sick, so Jesus must go to sinners in order to help them overcome their sins. Jesus had earlier announced that his mission was a call to repentance in Mark 1:14–15.

The Oxyrhynchus Gospels 1224 5:1–2 also record this episode of "dining with sinners".

Jesus thus ends the debate with a statement with no rebuttal by his opponents. Many see this as Mark's way of telling the story to set up Jesus for his memorable words, which Mark uses in the next two incidents and others as well. Scholars have labeled this method of narration an apophthegm, chreia or pronouncement story. All three synoptics have this occur after the healing of the paralyzed man.

Mark says many people followed Jesus. In contrast to the followers Jesus attracted, it is not clear how many actual disciples (students) he recruited, only Luke 6:17 calls it a "great crowd of ... disciples", and John 6:66 says that many left.

== Fasting and new wineskins ==
Some people asked why is it that the disciples of John the Baptist and the Pharisees (often) fast, or were engaged in fasting just at that point in time, but the disciples of Jesus did not fast (2:18). People fasted for many reasons, such as mourning or penitence, but another reason was to prepare for the anticipated coming of the messiah and perhaps even to hasten the process. Heinrich Julius Holtzmann suggests that John's disciples might have been fasting "on account of the loss of their master", although Meyer considers this an unsupported interpretation.

Jesus answered their question, saying "Can ye make the children of the bridechamber fast, while the bridegroom is with them?" He is referred to as a bridegroom in several places in the New Testament, such as in John 3:29, 2 Corinthians 11:2, the Epistle to the Ephesians 5:32 and Revelation 19:7 and 21:2. Jesus speaking of himself as the bridegroom carries messianic overtones. There is no purpose in fasting as the messiah, Jesus, is already here and his coming is like a wedding celebration, at which people do not fast.

Jesus then says the bridegroom will be "taken from them" and then his disciples will fast "on that day", or "on those days". All three synoptic gospels use the same phrase, ἀπάρθη ἀπ’ αὐτῶν (aparthē ap’ autōn), which does not appear elsewhere in the New Testament. The words are taken as an allusion to Jesus' death. For those who do not believe Jesus had foreknowledge of his death this is taken as an interpolation of the early Church.

Marks' account follows this with "No one sews a patch of unshrunk cloth on an old garment. If he does, the new piece will pull away from the old, making the tear worse. And no one pours new wine into old wineskins. If he does, the wine will burst the skins, and both the wine and the wineskins will be ruined. No, he pours new wine into new wineskins." (2:21–21)

What its exact meaning is in the original context is not totally clear to scholars today. It is easily interpreted to mean Jesus was proposing a new way of doing things. The new "unshrunk" patch for the cloth can not be melded to the old cloth as it will shrink and make the tear of the cloth worse. One can also not use "new" wine with "old" wineskins as the new wine will ferment and expand and break the old skins. Jesus thus seems to be concerned that the patch and the "new" wine as well as the "old" cloth and old wineskins be preserved. This might be Jesus trying to convey that one must shed those old things that are incompatible with his new way.

Ignatius of Antioch, among others, interpreted it as Jesus saying he was the start of a new religion separate from John the Baptist and Second Temple Judaism. Some Christians have used it to propose new ways of being Christian or even entirely new forms of Christianity. As early as the second century, Marcion used it to justify his doctrine, later called Marcionism and deemed heretical.

John Calvin, in his Commentary on Matthew, Mark, and Luke, states that the old wineskins and the old garment represent Jesus' disciples, and the new wine and unshrunk cloth represent the practice of fasting twice a week. Fasting this way would be burdensome to the new disciples, and would be more than they could bear.

== Plucking grain on Sabbath ==
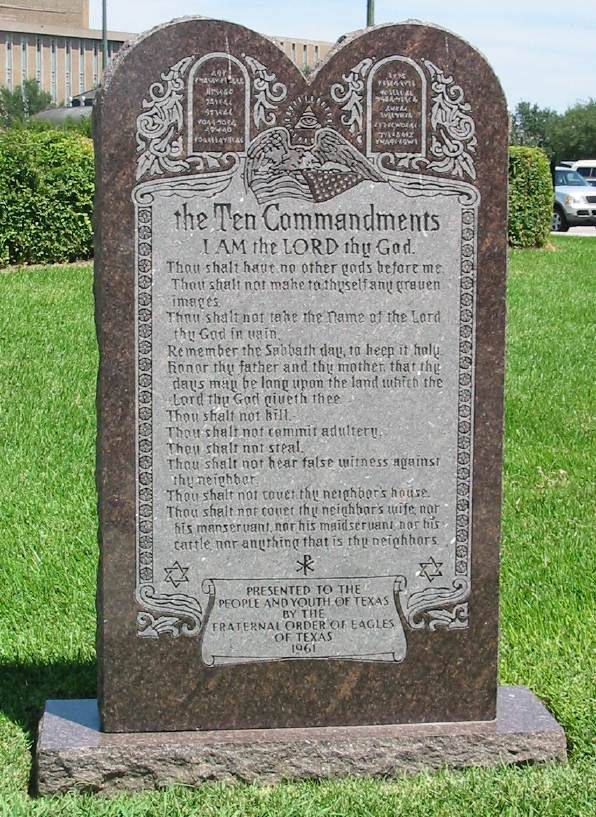
The Ten Commandments on a monument on the grounds of the Texas State Capitol. The third non-indented commandment listed is "Remember the Sabbath day, to keep it holy".

One sabbath he was going through the grainfields; and as they made their way his disciples began to pluck heads of grain. The Pharisees accused them of breaking Sabbath (2:23–24). The command to observe Sabbath is found in Exodus 31:16–17, a "perpetual covenant ... [for] the people of Israel" (NRSV). Some think this is not historical but is Mark's literary way of debating Sabbath observance issues. E. P. Sanders argues that these debates on Sabbath, handwashing, and food are artificial constructs of Mark as there were debates between Paul and other Christians (Gal 2:11–14; 4:10; Rom 14:1–6) about the issue after Jesus' ministry. The Jesus Seminar determined Mark 2:23–28, Matt 12:1–8, Luke 6:1–5 to be "pink" acts of Jesus, that is "a close approximation of what Jesus did" and call them "Sabbath observance."

Jesus points out to them a story about David found in 1 Samuel 21. David ate the special consecrated bread reserved for the priests, detailed in Leviticus 24:5–9. In Mark, Jesus says this was when Abiathar was high priest, while Samuel says the high priest was Ahimelech, Abiathar's father. Neither Luke 6:4 and Matthew 12:4 name the high priest. Mark may have simply made an error or had an incomplete or inaccurate copy of the Books of Samuel. A few early Marcan manuscripts omit this phrase, but most scholars think the name of the priest was originally written by Mark, not a later copyist.

Jesus then says "The Sabbath was made for man, not man for the Sabbath. So the Son of Man is Lord even of the Sabbath." (2:27–28) Thus human needs take precedence over strict observance of the law. Some see this as a radical departure from the Jewish understanding of the law (see also Christianity and Judaism). Neither Luke 6:1–5 nor Matthew 12:1–8 have the first phrase putting people ahead of Sabbath. Since form critics believe the Q hypothesis and that Luke and Matthew copied from Mark, many argue they might have found this too radical and so chose not to include it. Jesus here claims he knows what Sabbath is for, and thus that he knows the mind of God, something only God could do, and equates himself with the "Lord of the Sabbath", God. The passage thus has a christological climax.

Most scholars agree that Sabbath and proper observance of Mosaic law in general were a point of contention between Jesus and other Jewish teachers. A minority position, held by scholars such as E. P. Sanders, is that these do not constitute proof of a rejection of the law, e.g., Sanders claims there was no significant conflict between the Pharisees as a group and Jesus and that the Church took some time to reach its position on Sabbath, which makes it difficult to believe Jesus specifically taught one position or the other. The Jewish Encyclopedia article on Jesus argues the Halakah ("Jewish Law") was not in so definite a form at this period due to the disputes of Bet Hillel and Bet Shammai.

There were debates within Early Christianity, such as at the Council of Jerusalem between Paul and Jewish Christians, over just how much of the Law of Moses one should follow. This passage might have been used by the early Church in defense of their less than strict observance of Sabbath against Jews like the Pharisees who held a harder line on Sabbath observance. The Jewish Encyclopedia article on Jesus notes: "...stricter rabbis allowed only the saving of life to excuse the slightest curtailment of the Sabbath rest (Shab. xxii. 6)."

These stories are almost entirely the same in Luke 5–6, and in Matthew except for the story of the Sabbath, which occurs in Matthew at Chapter 12. They do not occur in John except for perhaps the paralyzed man.

According to the Jewish Encyclopedia: New Testament: Misunderstood Passages:

Misunderstanding of the term "be-ḥad le-shabba tinyana" (on the first of the second week after Passover), preserved only in Luke vi. 1, caused the confusion of the law concerning the new produce of the year (Lev. xxiii. 11–14) with Sabbath law (see Jew. Encyc. vii. 168, s.v. Jesus). In the one case Jesus, referring to David, defended his disciples, who in their hunger plucked the new corn in the field and ate it without waiting for the offering upon the altar; in the other case he himself disregarded Sabbath law in view of the "pikkuaḥ nefesh" (peril of life), a case in which the Rabbis admitted the suspension of the law, upon the principle, "The Sabbath is given over to you ["the son of man"], and not you to the Sabbath" (see Mek., Wayaḳhel, 1; Chwolson, "Das Letzte Passahmahl," 1892, pp. 59–67, 91–92).

The Jewish Encyclopedia article on Gentile: Gentiles May Not Be Taught the Torah notes the following reconciliation:

R. Emden, in a remarkable apology for Christianity contained in his appendix to "Seder 'Olam" (pp. 32b–34b, Hamburg, 1752), gives it as his opinion that the original intention of Jesus, and especially of Paul, was to convert only the Gentiles to the seven moral laws of Noah and to let the Jews follow the Mosaic law — which explains the apparent contradictions in the New Testament regarding the laws of Moses and the Sabbath.

== See also ==
- Christianity and Judaism § Sin

== Sources ==
- Brown, Raymond E. An Introduction to the New Testament Doubleday 1997 ISBN 0-385-24767-2
- Brown, Raymond E. et al. The New Jerome Biblical Commentary Prentice Hall 1990 ISBN 0-13-614934-0
- Herbermann, Charles, ed. (1913). "Judaizers" . Catholic Encyclopedia. New York: Robert Appleton Company.
- E. P. Sanders, accessed 11 October 2005
- Jewish Encyclopedia on Jesus, accessed 8 September 2006
- Kilgallen, John J. A Brief Commentary on the Gospel of Mark Paulist Press 1989 ISBN 0-8091-3059-9
- Marcionism, accessed 11 October 2005
- Miller, Robert J. Editor The Complete Gospels Polebridge Press 1994 ISBN 0-06-065587-9
- Sanders, E.P. Jesus and Judaism Fortress Press 1985 ISBN 0-8006-0743-0

Preceded by Mark 1	Chapters of the Bible; Gospel of Mark	Succeeded by Mark 3
