= Matthew 9 =

- ← chapter 8 chapter 10 →
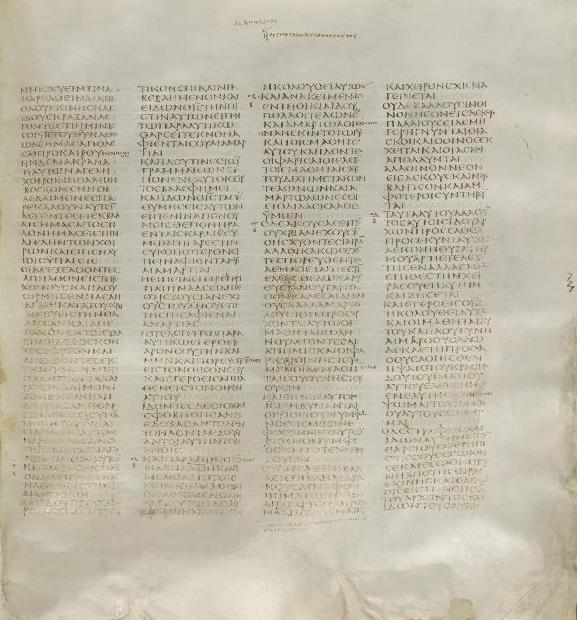
- Matthew 8:28–9:23 on Codex Sinaiticus (AD 330–360)
- Book: Gospel of Matthew
- Category: Gospel
- Christian Bible part: New Testament
- Order in the Christian part: 1

Matthew 9 is the ninth chapter of the Gospel of Matthew in the New Testament. It continues the narrative about Jesus' ministry in Galilee as he ministers to the public, working miracles, and going through all the cities and towns of the area, preaching the gospel, and healing every disease. This chapter opens with Jesus back in "his own town", i.e. Capernaum. This chapter reflects "the crucial role of faith" in relation to healing.

== Text ==
The original text was written in Koine Greek. This chapter is divided into 25 verses.

=== Textual witnesses ===
Some early manuscripts containing the text of this chapter are:

- Codex Vaticanus (AD 325–350)
- Codex Sinaiticus (AD 330–360; complete)
- Codex Bezae (c. AD 400)
- Codex Washingtonianus (c. AD 400)
- Codex Ephraemi Rescriptus (c. AD 450; complete)
- Minuscule 828 (Codex 828; 12th century)

=== Old Testament references ===
- Matthew 9:13: Hosea 6:6
- Matthew 9:36: Numbers 27:16

== Structure ==
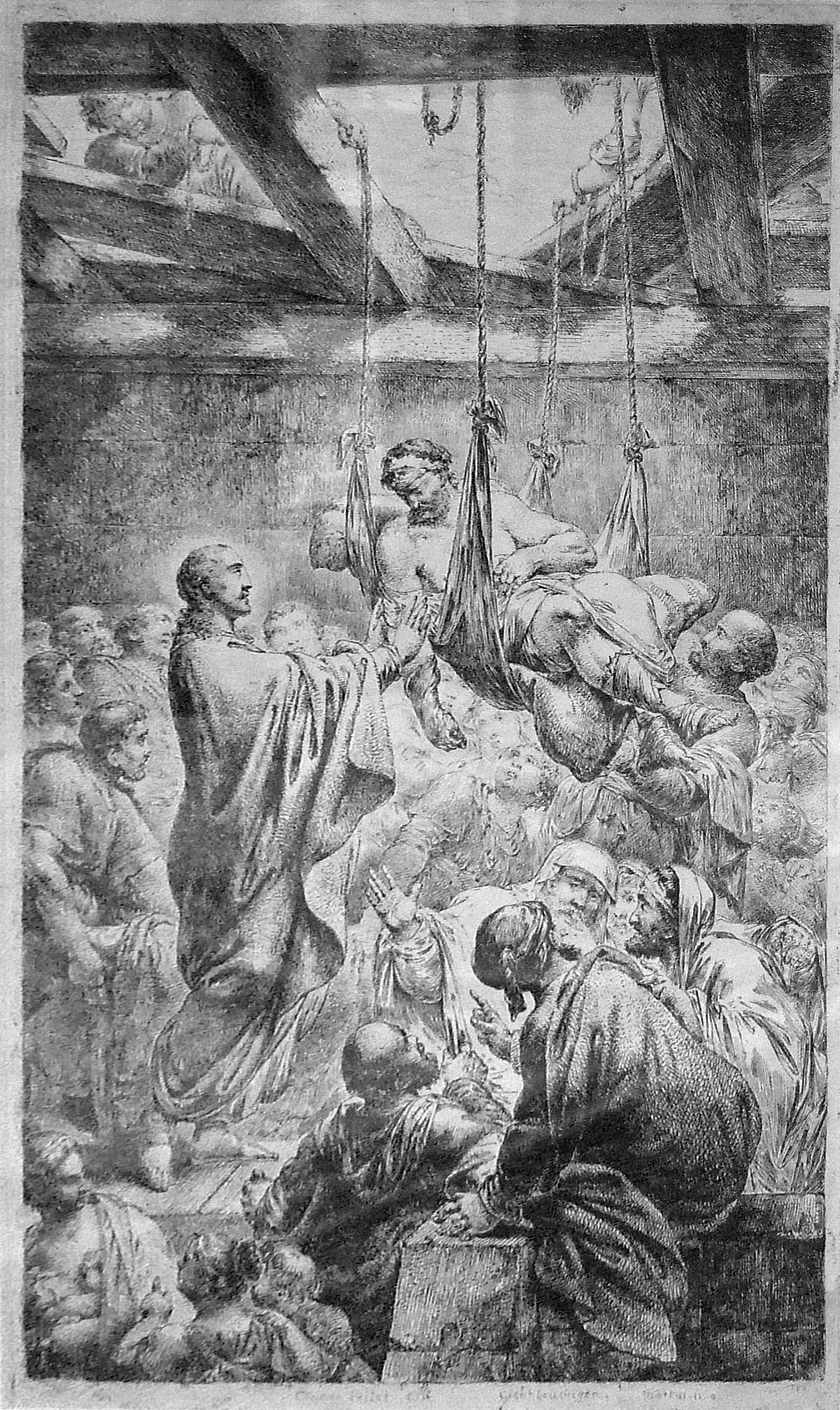
Christ healing the paralytic at Capernaum by Bernhard Rode 1780

This chapter can be grouped (with cross references to parallel texts in Mark and Luke):

- Matthew 9:1–8 = Healing the paralytic at Capernaum (Mark 2:1–12; Luke 5:17–26)
- Matthew 9:9–13 = Calling of Matthew (Mark 2:13–17; Luke 5:27–32)
- Matthew 9:14–15 = On fasting (Mark 2:18–22; Luke 5:33–39)
- Matthew 9:16–17 = New Wine into Old Wineskins (Mark 2:18–22; Luke 5:33–39)
- Matthew 9:18–19,23–26 = Daughter of Jairus (Mark 5:21–24,35–43; Luke 8:40–42,49–56)
- Matthew 9:20–22 = Jesus healing the bleeding woman (Mark 5:25–34; Luke 8:43–48)
- Matthew 9:27–31 = Healing the two blind men in Galilee (Mark 10:46–52)
- Matthew 9:32–34 = Jesus exorcising a mute
- Matthew 9:35–38 = Jesus' compassion

== Miracles ==
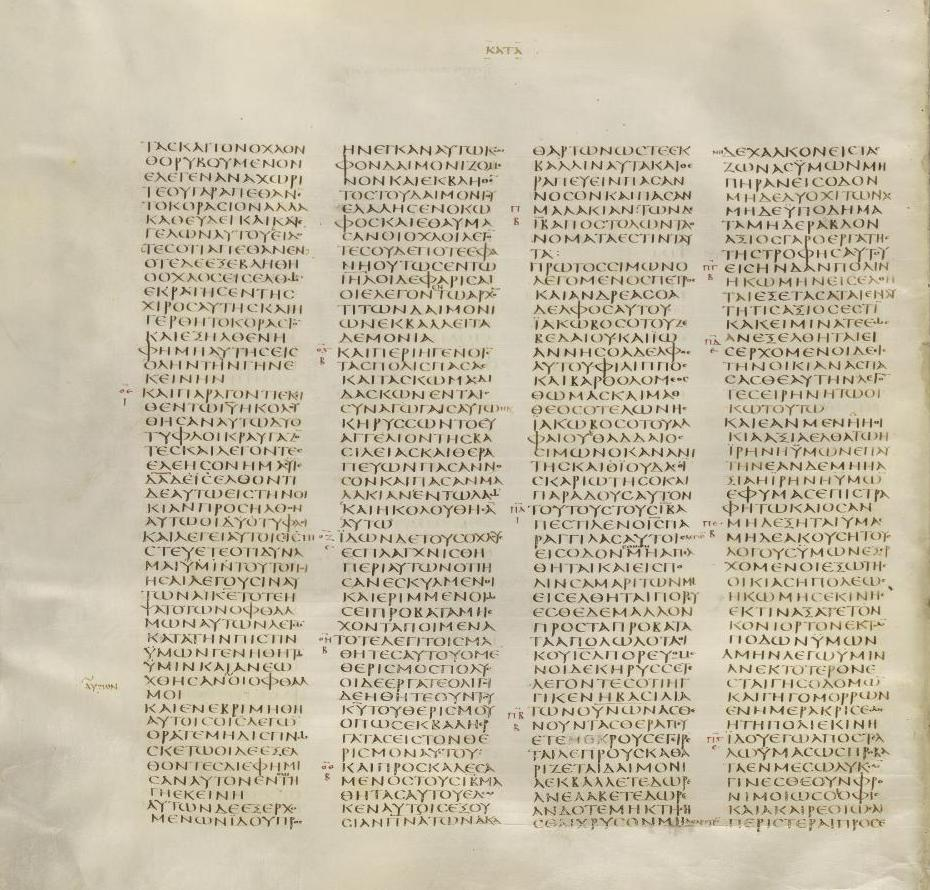
Codex Sinaiticus (AD 330–360), Matthew 9:23–10:17

The Jerusalem Bible notes that the ten miracles recorded in chapters 8 and 9 demonstrate the power of Jesus over nature, sickness, death and devils. New Testament scholar Dale Allison notes that these "merciful deeds" performed by Jesus, along with those in the previous chapter, are all undertaken for the benefit of "people from the margins of Jewish society or without status". Henry Alford describes these deeds as a "solemn procession of miracles", whose record confirms "the authority with which our Lord had spoken". On three occasions, in verses 2, 22 and 29, the relationship between faith and healing is reflected in the narrative.

== Pharisees ==
This chapter develops Matthew's account of the hostility which the Pharisees, (one of the sects of Second Temple Judaism), showed towards Jesus and his disciples. Following the calling of Matthew, Jesus and his disciples are invited to eat in the house (Matthew 9:10 – this is often understood to refer to Matthew's house, because in Luke 5:28 the house is clearly that of Matthew known also as Levi) and "many tax collectors and sinners came and sat down with Him and His disciples". The Pharisees in all three synoptic gospels ask the disciples why Jesus eats with tax collectors and sinners ("such scum" in the New Living Translation) and the question is either relayed back to Jesus or he overhears it.

=== Verses 12–13 ===
^{12}When Jesus heard that, He said to them, "Those who are well have no need of a physician, but those who are sick. ^{13}But go and learn what this means: 'I desire mercy and not sacrifice'. For I did not come to call the righteous, but sinners, to repentance."

Jesus' reply in these two verses comes in three parts:

- a saying, "healthy people don't need a doctor — sick people do" (Matthew 9:12: New Living Translation)
- a reproof made by appealing to "a passage of Scripture with which they ought to have been acquainted: I will have mercy, and not sacrifice" (Hosea 6:6: NKJV)
- a summary of his mission – "I did not come to call the righteous, but sinners [to repentance]".

The final words, to repentance, which some versions include but others do not, are "of doubtful authority here, and more than doubtful authority in Mark 2:17; but in Luke 5:32 they are undisputed". A number of early manuscripts do not include these words in Matthew.

== Fasting ==
Verse 14 aligns both the disciples of John the Baptist and the Pharisees in the practice of regular fasting, and contrasts this with the practice of Jesus' disciples, who appear not to fast. In Matthew's gospel it is John's disciples who ask the question, for themselves and for the Pharisees, about why Jesus' disciples do not fast. In Mark's gospel, the question is in some interpretations asked by apparently impartial observers – "some people came and asked Jesus ...".

== Raising of Jairus' daughter and the healing of a bleeding woman ==
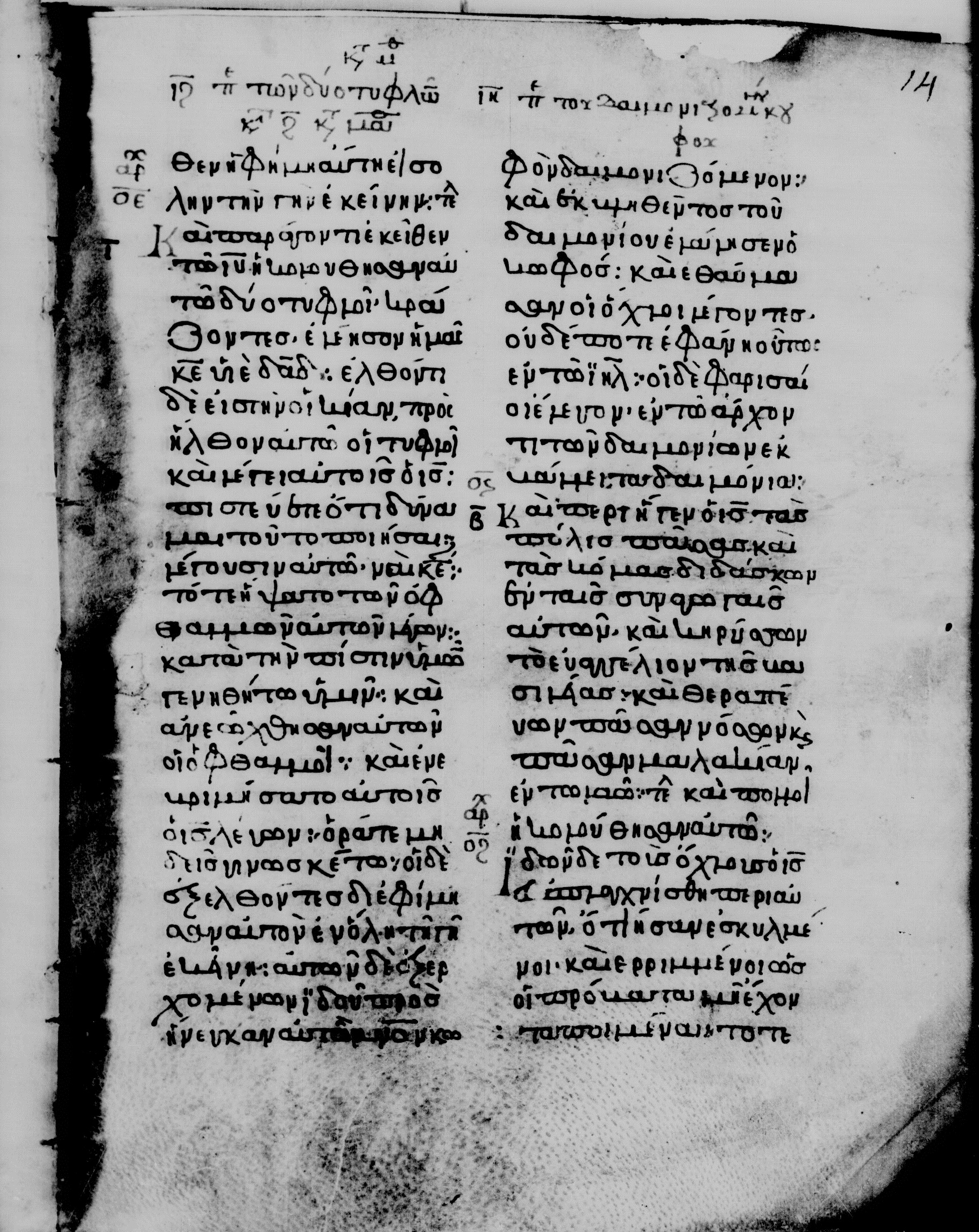
Minuscule/Codex 828 (12th century), Matthew 9:26–36

In the Gospel of Luke, the miracles follow the exorcism at Gerasa. Back in Galilee, Jairus, a patron or ruler of a Galilee synagogue, had asked Jesus to heal his 12-year-old daughter, who was dying (in Matthew's account, Jairus used hyperbolic expressions in his anxiety: ‘My daughter is even now dead’). As they were travelling to Jairus' house, a sick woman in the crowd touched the border (or possibly the fringe) of Jesus' cloak and was healed of her sickness. Jairus' daughter was then reported as having died, and Jairus was therefore advised not to trouble Jesus, 'the teacher', any further. Jesus, however, continued to the house, stating that the girl was not dead but asleep, and restored her to health. The chapter ends with Jesus' mandate that Jairus and his wife should tell no-one what had happened.

== Tzitzit ==
Matthew's (and Luke's) accounts specify that the bleeding woman touched the "fringe" of his cloak, using a Greek word kraspedon which also appears in Mark 6. According to the Catholic Encyclopedia article on fringes in scripture, the Pharisees, who were the progenitors of modern Rabbinic Judaism, were in the habit of wearing extra-long fringes or tassels (Matthew 23:5), a reference to the formative çîçîth (tzitzit). Because of the Pharisees' authority, people regarded the fringe with a mystical quality.

== Jesus' compassion ==
The chapter concludes with a summary of Jesus' ministry "in all the cities and villages". When he saw the crowds he was moved with compassion for them, seeing the crowds as "sheep without a shepherd". According to the Westcott-Hort Greek New Testament, the crowds were, in Greek: ἐσκυλμένοι καὶ ἐριμμένοι, eskylmenoi and erimmenoi, but in the Textus Receptus the first adjective here is Greek: ἐκλελυμένοι, eklelymenoi. According to Bengel's Gnomon, "the reading ἐκλελυμένοι is clearly deficient in authority".

English translations vary widely in how they translate these two adjectives:

Version	ἐσκυλμένοι	ἐριμμένοι
ASV	distressed	scattered
ERV	worried	helpless
ISV	troubled	helpless
KJV	fainted	scattered abroad
NET	bewildered	helpless
NIV	harassed	helpless
NKJV	weary	scattered

The portrayal of "sheep without a shepherd" reflects Moses' prayer for God to appoint a leader to succeed him after his death during the Israelites' Exodus journey:

Moses spoke to the Lord, saying: 'Let the Lord, the God of the spirits of all flesh, set a man over the congregation, who may go out before them and go in before them, who may lead them out and bring them in, that the congregation of the Lord may not be like sheep which have no shepherd'.

Jesus' ministry of curing "every disease and every sickness" (Greek: θεραπεύων πᾶσαν νόσον καὶ πᾶσαν μαλακίαν) is matched identically in the authority he gives his twelve disciples in Matthew 10:1 to cure "every disease and every sickness".

== See also ==
- Capernaum
- Jairus
- Matthew
- Tzitzit
- Related Bible parts: Numbers 15, Hosea 6, Mark 2, Mark 5, Luke 5, Luke 8
