= Prayers of Jesus =

Prayers made by Jesus in the canonical gospels

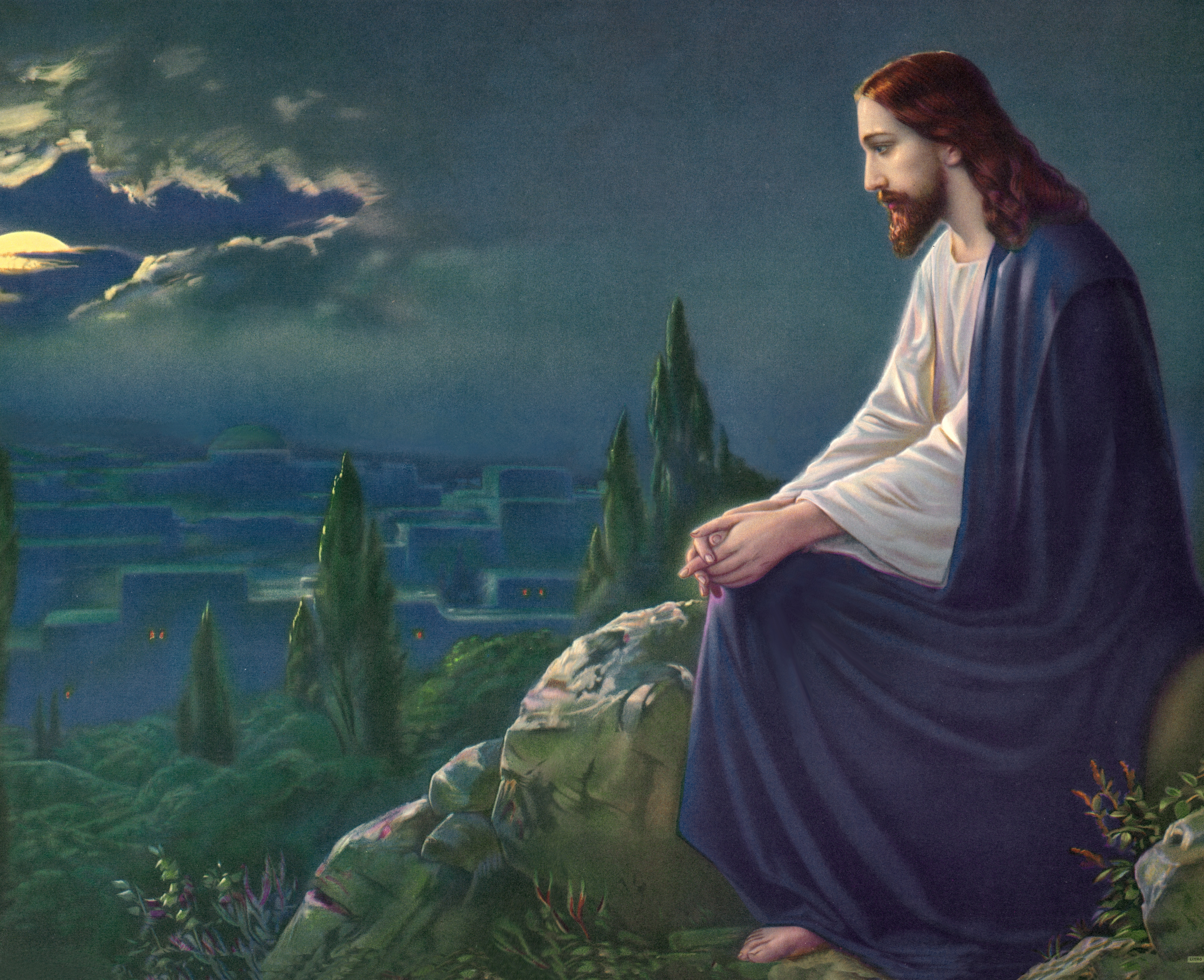
Christ on the Mount of Olives, by Josef Untersberger

There are a number of times in which the canonical gospels describe Jesus Christ praying to God.

== Recorded prayers ==
The gospels record words that Jesus spoke in prayer:

- Thanking God for his revelation (Matthew 11:25, Luke 10:21)
- Before the raising of Lazarus (John 11:41-42)
- "Father, glorify your name" (John 12:28)
- His prayer in John 17
- Three prayers in the Garden of Gethsemane
- Three prayers on the cross:
  - "Father forgive them; for they know not what they do" (Luke 23:34)
  - "My God, My God, why hast thou forsaken me?" (Matt 27:46, Mark 15:34)
  - "Father, into thy hands I commit my spirit" (Luke 23:46)

== Other references to Jesus praying ==
Other references to Jesus praying include:

- At his baptism (Luke 3:21)
- Regular times of withdrawal from the crowds to pray (Luke 5:16: Jesus "often withdrew into the wilderness and prayed").
- After healing people in the evening (Mark 1:35)
- Before walking on water (Matt 14:23, Mark 6:46, John 6:15)
- Before choosing the Twelve (Luke 6:12)
- Before Peter's confession (Luke 9:18)
- At the Transfiguration (Luke 9:29)
- Before teaching his disciples the Lord's Prayer (Luke 11:1)
- Jesus says that he has prayed for Peter's faith (Luke 22:32)

In addition to this, Jesus said grace before the feeding miracles, at the Last Supper, and at the supper at Emmaus.

== Variation in Jesus' prayers ==
When Jesus prayed in the Garden of Gethsemane, he did so with his face to the ground (Matthew 26:39). On the other hand, in John 11:41 and 17:1, he looked upwards as he prayed.

R. A. Torrey asserts that Jesus prayed early in the morning as well as all night, that he prayed both before and after the great events of his life, and that he prayed "when life was unusually busy".

== See also ==
- Christian prayer
