= Matthew 9:30 =

- ← 9:29 9:31 →
- Book: Gospel of Matthew
- Christian Bible part: New Testament

Matthew 9:30 is a verse in the ninth chapter of the Gospel of Matthew in the New Testament.

== Content ==
In the original Greek according to Westcott-Hort for this verse is:

Καὶ ἀνεῴχθησαν αὐτῶν οἱ ὀφθαλμοί· καὶ ἐνεβριμήσατο αὐτοῖς ὁ Ἰησοῦς, λέγων, Ὁρᾶτε μηδεὶς γινωσκέτω.

In the King James Version of the Bible the text reads:

And their eyes were opened; and Jesus straitly charged them, saying, See that no man know it.

The New International Version translates the passage as:

and their sight was restored. Jesus warned them sternly, "See that no one knows about this."

== Analysis ==
The Greek word 'ἐνεβριμήσατο' (he strictly charged) implies a certain harshness in Jesus message, which from the next verse we find the men ignored. Lapide states that the reason for the strictness was to show Jesus' "strong dislike of ostentation in His miracles, and of vainglory," and also to instruct us to dislike it as well.

== Commentary from the Church Fathers ==
Chrysostom: "And not for this reason only, but that He might make manifest that they were worthy of healing, and that none might object, that if mercy alone saved, then ought all to be saved. Therefore also He requires faith of them, that He may thereby raise their thoughts higher; they had called Him the Son of David, therefore He instructs them that they should think higher things of Him. Thus He does not say to them, Believe ye that I can ask the Father? But, Believe ye that I am able to do this? They say unto him, Yea, Lord. They call Him no more Son of David, but exalt Him higher, and confess His dominion. Then He lays His hand upon them; as it follows, Then he touched their eyes, saying, According to your faith be it unto you. This He says confirming their faith, and testifying that what they had said were not words of flattery. Then follows the cure, And their eyes were opened. And after this, His injunction that they should tell it to no man; and this not a simple command, but with much earnestness, And Jesus straitly charged them, saying, See that no man know it; but they went forth, and spread abroad the fame of him through the whole country."

Jerome: "The Lord from humility shunning the fame of His glorious works, gave them this charge, and they from gratitude cannot be silent respecting so great benefit."

Chrysostom: "That He said to another man, Go, and proclaim the glory of God, (Luke 8:39.) is not contrary to this; for what He would teach is, that we should hinder those that would commend us for ourselves. But when it is the Lord’s glory that is to be praised, we ought not to forbid, but to promote it ourselves."

Hilary of Poitiers: "Or He enjoins silence on the blind men, because to preach was the Apostles’ office."

Gregory the Great: "We must enquire how this is that the Almighty, whose will and power are coextensive, should have here willed that His excellent works should be hid in silence, and is yet preached against His will, as it were, by these men who have received their sight. It is only that He herein has left an example to His servants who follow Him, that they should desire their own good deeds to be hid, and that notwithstanding they should be made known against their will, that others may profit by their example. They should then be hid by design, and published of compulsion; their concealment is by our own watchfulness, their betrayal is for others’ profit."

Saint Remigius: "Allegorically; By these two blind men are denoted the two nations of Jews and Gentiles, or the two nations of the Jewish race; for in the time of Roboam his kingdom was Split into two parts. Out of both nations such as believed on Him Christ gave sight to in the house, by which is understood the Church; for without the unity of the Church no man can be saved. And they of the Jews who had believed the Lord's coming spread the knowledge thereof throughout the whole earth."

Rabanus Maurus: "The house of the ruler is the Synagogue which was ruled by Moses; the house of Jesus is the heavenly Jerusalem. As the Lord passed through this world and was returning to His own house, two blind men followed Him; that is, when the Gospel was preached by the Apostles, many of the Jews and Gentiles began to follow Him. But when He ascended into Heaven, then He entered His house, that is, into the confession of one faith which is in the Catholic Church, and in that they were enlightened."

Preceded by Matthew 9:29	Gospel of Matthew; Chapter 9	Succeeded by Matthew 9:31
