= Matthew 9:28 =

- ← 9:27 9:29 →
- Book: Gospel of Matthew
- Christian Bible part: New Testament

Matthew 9:28 is a verse in the ninth chapter of the Gospel of Matthew in the New Testament.

== Content ==
In the original Greek according to Westcott-Hort for this verse is:

Ἐλθόντι δὲ εἰς τὴν οἰκίαν, προσῆλθον αὐτῷ οἱ τυφλοί, καὶ λέγει αὐτοῖς ὁ Ἰησοῦς, Πιστεύετε ὅτι δύναμαι τοῦτο ποιῆσαι; Λέγουσιν αὐτῷ, Ναί, Κύριε.

In the King James Version of the Bible the text reads:

And when he was come into the house, the blind men came to him: and Jesus saith unto them, Believe ye that I am able to do this? They said unto him, Yea, Lord.

The New International Version translates the passage as:

When he had gone indoors, the blind men came to him, and he asked them, "Do you believe that I am able to do this? Yes, Lord," they replied.

== Analysis ==
Why Jesus does not heal the men outside but instead brings them into his house is an open question. MacEvilly and Lapide give two possible explanations: 1) To test and kindle their faith, and desire of healing. 2) To teach the importance of persevering in prayer. Jesus question to them explores their faith, that he alone ("I am able"), not acting as a mediator, is able to do the act.

== Commentary from the Church Fathers ==
Jerome: " Yet were they not healed by the way-side and in passing as they had thought to be; but when He was entered into the house, they come unto Him; and first their faith is made proof of, that so they may receive the light of the true faith. And when he was come into the house, the blind men came unto him; and Jesus said unto them, Believe ye that I am able to do this?"

Chrysostom: " Here again He teaches us to exclude the desire of fame; because there was a house hard by, He takes them there to heal them apart."

Saint Remigius: " He who was able to give sight to the blind, was not ignorant whether they believed; but He asked them, in order that the faith which they bare in their hearts, being confessed by their mouth might be made deserving of a higher reward, according to that of the Apostle, By the mouth confession is made unto salvation. (Rom. 10:10.)"

Preceded by Matthew 9:27	Gospel of Matthew; Chapter 9	Succeeded by Matthew 9:29
