= Raising of Jairus' daughter =

Miracle episode in the synoptic gospels

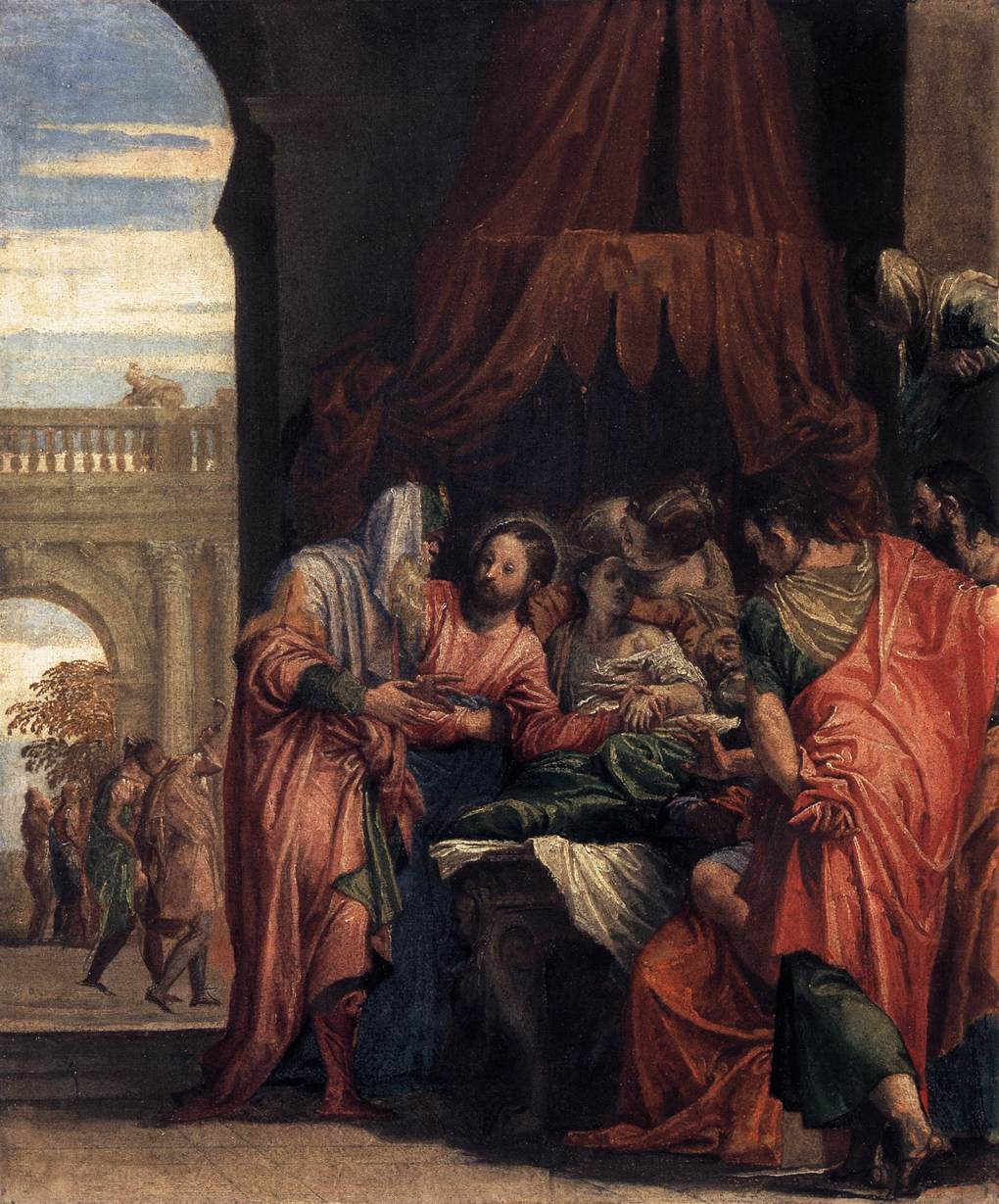
- Raising of Jairus' Daughter by Paolo Veronese, 1546

Information
- Type: Resurrection
- Date: During the lifetime of Jesus Christ
- People involved: Jesus Christ, Peter, James, John, Jairus and his daughter

Location
- Country: Israel

The raising of Jairus' daughter is a reported miracle of Jesus that occurs in the synoptic Gospels, where it is interwoven with the account of the healing of a bleeding woman. The narratives can be found in Mark 5:21–43, Matthew 9:18–26 and Luke 8:40–56.

== Summary ==
Scholars have long recognised the Lukan and Matthean accounts of the story derive from the Markan account and are a typical example of a Synoptic triple tradition. The story has no equivalent in the Gospel of John. Although some have drawn comparisons with the healing the royal official's son (John 4:46–53) and with the raising of Lazarus (John 11:1–54) narratives, Zwiep (2015) states that "they are entirely different and unrelated stories, according to most biblical scholars to date".

=== Premise ===
As ancient biographies could display differences and flexibility in reporting, differences between the three Gospel narratives are well known amongst scholars and in line with the writing practices of historians in antiquity. The premise of the story in Mark and Luke is that a ruler (Mark: εἷς τῶν ἀρχισυναγώγων "one of the synagogue rulers"; Luke: ἄρχων τῆς συναγωγῆς "a ruler of a synagogue") of a Galilean synagogue called Jairus (Greek: Ἰάειρος, Iaeiros, from the Hebrew name Yair) wants Jesus to "heal/save" (Mark: σωθῇ) his 12-year-old daughter who is "dying" (Luke: ἀπέθνῃσκεν) or "holding at (the point of) the end" (Mark: ἐσχάτως ἔχει; often translated as "at the point of death"). In Matthew, the synagogue ruler is unnamed, the girl's age is not mentioned, she has already "just died" (ἄρτι ἐτελεύτησεν), and the father's request is that Jesus lay his hand upon her "and she will live [again]" (Matthew: καὶ ζήσεται). In other words, in Matthew he requests Jesus to reverse her death rather than prevent it, in contrast to the accounts of Mark and Luke.

=== Setting ===
As ancient compositional practices involved chronological displacement and compression, the timing and setting differs somewhat between the Gospels, with even reliable biographers like Plutarch displaying such differences. In Mark and Luke, the story follows the exorcism at Gerasa; Jairus comes up to Jesus as soon as he disembarks from his boat. In Matthew, it is preceded by three other events (healing the paralytic, calling of Matthew, New Wine into Old Wineskins). There, Jesus is at Matthew the Apostle's house associating with tax collectors and sinners, while debating with Pharisees and disciples of John the Baptist, when the synagogue ruler arrives.

Mark and Luke report a large crowd (ὄχλος) following Jesus around and pressing against him (συνέθλιβον/συνέπνιγον αὐτόν) as he follows Jairus to his house. Matthew makes no such mention; it is only Jesus and his disciples (μαθηταὶ) following the synagogue ruler.

=== The bleeding woman ===
The narrative about Jairus' daughter is interrupted by the appearance of a woman who had a haemorrhage (Matthew: αἱμορροοῦσα haimorroousa "having had a flow of blood"; Mark/Luke: οὖσα ἐν ῥύσει αἵματος ousa en rhysei haimatos "being with a flow of blood") for 12 years. Mark and Luke inform the reader that all this time nobody could heal her, with Mark dramatically adding 'she had spent all she had on physicians to no avail' (Mark 5:25–26; Luke 8:43). (Note: Some later, mostly Byzantine text-type, manuscripts of Luke 8:43 also feature the words ιατροις προσαναλωσασα ολον τομ βιον (and had spent all her living upon physicians) or εἰς ἰατρούς (to(wards) physicians). Most scholars think that inclusions of this phrase in later manuscripts are probably a result of harmonisation attempts with Mark 5:26 rather than a Lukan rewriting of the Markan original, especially because προσαναλωσασα is a hapax legomenon.) In Mark and Luke her bleeding stopped immediately when she touched Jesus' cloak. In Matthew, she was not healed until after Jesus had told her: "Take courage, daughter, your faith healed you." Matthew's story of the bleeding woman also concludes there (Matthew 9:20–22).

In Mark and Luke, the woman's act of touching his cloak appears to disturb Jesus, who seems agitated or even angry (given the mention that the woman φοβηθεῖσα καὶ τρέμουσα 'trembled in fear' at his reaction), as he feels (Mark) or says (Luke) that "power had gone out of him/me". Jesus asks around the crowd: "Who touched me/my clothes?" Luke claims that all those in the crowd denied they did it, and has Peter say that crowds are pressing against Jesus (Mark only reports the latter, from the mouths of "the disciples"). Unsatisfied, Jesus keeps inspecting the crowd until the now-healed woman, trembling in fear, falls at Jesus' feet and admits that it was her. Jesus answers: "Daughter, your faith has healed you. Go in peace (and be freed from your suffering)", concluding the Markan and Lukan bleeding woman accounts (Mark 5:25–34, Luke 8:43–48).

=== Daughter reported dead ===
In Mark's and Luke's narrative, "[people] come" (Mark: ἔρχονται, plural) or "someone comes" (Luke: ἔρχεταί τις, singular) with the news that Jairus' daughter had died, and Jairus is advised not to trouble Jesus any further. However, Jesus responds: "Don’t be afraid; just believe", with Luke extending the quote with "and she will be healed/saved" (σωθήσεται). When arriving at Jairus' house, Jesus does not let anyone follow him inside "except Peter, James and John, the brother of James", with Luke adding "and the father of the child and the mother", later also added by Mark (Mark 5:35–37,40; Luke 8:49–50). In Matthew's account, the daughter was already dead from the start, and Jesus "allows no bystanders to witness Jesus performing the resurrection miracle (Mt. 9.25)".

=== Jesus raises the daughter ===
At Jairus' house, Mark and Luke report that Jesus "saw a commotion, with people crying and wailing loudly" (Mark 5:38; Luke 8:52 NIV); according to Matthew, he "saw the noisy crowd and people playing pipes" (Matthew 9:23 NIV). He informed all those present that the girl was not dead but asleep; in Matthew, Jesus even tells the crowd "Go away". But the crowd laughs at Jesus. Mark says Jesus put the crowd outside; Matthew confirms this happens without mentioning who does it; Luke doesn't report it, but instead emphasises that the crowd "knew she had died".

Jesus then went back inside (Mark, Matthew). He took the girl by the hand, and she got up. In Mark's account, the Aramaic phrase Talitha koum (transliterated into Greek as ταλιθα κουμ and reportedly meaning, "Little girl, I say to you, get up!") is attributed to Jesus (Mark 5:41 NIV). Luke's Jesus says "My child, get up!"; Matthew's Jesus is silent. The accounts in Mark and Luke end with Jesus' commands that the girl should be fed and that Jairus and his wife should tell nobody what had happened. On the other hand, Matthew concludes the narrative by saying: "News of this spread through all that region."

== Narrative comparison ==
The following comparison table is primarily based on the New International Version (NIV) English translation of the New Testament.

	Matthew	Mark	Luke
Jairus asks for help	Matthew 9:18–19: At Matthew's house [9:10], a synagogue leader told Jesus: 'My daughter has just died. But come and place your hand on her, and she will live.'; Jesus and his disciples followed him.	Mark 5:21–24: Jesus crossed the Sea of Galilee back, meeting a crowd.; Synagogue leader Jairus fell at Jesus' feet and pleaded: 'My little daughter is dying. Please place your hands on her, so that she will be healed and live.'; Jesus and a large crowd followed him and pressed around him.	Luke 8:40–42: Jesus returned to Galilee, meeting a crowd.; Synagogue leader Jairus fell at Jesus' feet and pleaded with him to come to his house because his only daughter (aged about 12), was dying.; Jesus followed him, was almost crushed by crowds.
The bleeding woman	Matthew 9:20–22: A woman who had been bleeding for 12 years touched Jesus' cloak, hoping to be healed.; Jesus saw her and said: 'Take courage, daughter, your faith has healed you.'; And from that moment the woman was healed.	Mark 5:25–34: A woman who had been bleeding for 12 years, and spent all she had on physicians to no avail, heard about Jesus and touched his cloak, hoping to be healed.; Her bleeding stopped immediately and she felt it.; Jesus felt power had gone out of him and asked: 'Who touched my clothes?'; Disciples: 'You see people crowding against you, so why ask?'; Jesus kept looking around to see who did it.; The woman fell at his feet and, trembling in fear, told the truth.; Jesus: 'Daughter, your faith has healed you. Go in peace and be freed from your suffering.'	Luke 8:43–48: A woman who had been bleeding for 12 years, whom nobody could heal, touched Jesus' cloak.; Her bleeding stopped immediately.; Jesus: 'Who touched me?'; All denied. Peter: 'People crowding and pressing against you.'; Jesus: 'Someone touched me, I know power has gone out of me.'; Seeing she would be noticed, the woman trembled in fear, fell at his feet, told why she touched him and that she was immediately healed.; Jesus: 'Daughter, your faith has healed you. Go in peace.'
Daughter reported dead		Mark 5:35–37: People came from Jairus' house, telling him: 'Your daughter is dead, why bother the teacher anymore?'; Jesus heard them and said: 'Don't be afraid, just believe.'; Jesus didn't let anyone follow him except Peter, James and John, the brother of James.	Luke 8:49–50: Someone came from Jairus' house, telling him: 'Your daughter is dead. Don't bother the teacher anymore.'; Jesus heard him and told Jairus: 'Don't be afraid; just believe, and she will be healed.'; Having entered Jairus' house, Jesus didn't let anyone go in with him except Peter, James, John and the parents.
Jesus raises daughter	Matthew 9:23–26: Jesus entered synagogue leader's house and saw a noisy, flute-playing crowd.; Jesus: 'Go away. The girl is not dead, but asleep.'; The crowd laughed at Jesus. They were put outside.; Jesus went in, took the girl by the hand, and she got up.; News spread throughout that region.	Mark 5:38–43: Jesus entered synagogue leader's house and saw a crying and wailing crowd.; Jesus: 'Why all this commotion and wailing? The child is not dead but asleep.'; The crowd laughed at Jesus. He put them outside.; Jesus took the parents and his 3 disciples in, took the child by the hand and said: 'Talitha koum! (Little girl, I say to you, get up!)'; The girl stood up and walked around (she was 12 years old).; Jesus strictly ordered people not to tell anyone about this and to give her something to eat.	Luke 8:51–56: All people were wailing and mourning her.; Jesus: 'Stop wailing. She is not dead but asleep.'; The people laughed at Jesus, knowing she was dead.; Jesus took the girl by the hand and said: 'My child, get up!'; Her spirit returned and she stood up.; Jesus told them to give her something to eat. The parents were astonished, but Jesus ordered them not to tell anyone what happened.

== Interpretations ==
=== Significance of 12 years ===
The combined stories have been used as an example of intercalation ("sandwich story"), where one incident is inserted within another, linked in this case by the connection between the 12-year ailment and the 12-year-old girl. Twelve years also represents the age at which girls come of age in Judaism, and so it appears that Mark and Luke mention the girl's age to emphasise the tragedy of her dying before her father could marry her off, receive a dowry, and expect grandchildren to continue his lineage. Mary Ann Getty-Sullivan (2001): "Thus the father may have faced financial loss as well as social disgrace, in addition to the personal sorrow of his daughter's illness and death."

=== Status of women ===
Other links established by Getty-Sullivan include the fact that Jesus calls the bleeding woman 'daughter' as he travels to Jairus' daughter; the apparent inferior status of both females as the girl's father represents her (and she is not given her own name, but is rather titled 'daughter of'); the woman dares not face Jesus to ask for healing, but secretly approaches him from behind to touch his clothes; and the fact that both females are ritually unclean by their afflictions, and yet Jesus miraculously heals them by touching them.

According to Barbara E. Reid (1996), it is significant that Luke adds that it is the father's only daughter, and that the Raising of the son of the widow of Nain narrative (only told in Luke's gospel, 7:11–17) mirrors it exactly by stating that he was the mother's only son. Seeing that the genders are reversed here, but nevertheless treated in the same way, Reid concluded that daughters and sons were treated as equals by Luke's Jesus, in contrast to that society's culture, which valued sons far above daughters.

=== Role of faith ===
John Donahue and Daniel Harrington (2015) state that this episode shows that "faith, especially as embodied by the bleeding woman, can exist in seemingly hopeless situations". Michael Keene (2002) states that there is a link between Jairus and the woman: "The link between them is faith since both Jairus and the bleeding woman showed great faith in Jesus". John Walvoord and Roy Zuck (1983) state that: "What appeared to be a disastrous delay in the healing of the woman actually assured the restoration of Jairus' daughter. It was providentially ordered to test and strengthen Jairus' faith." Johann Lange (1960) also states that: "This delay would serve both to try and to strengthen the faith of Jairus."

=== Description of the raising ===
William Robertson Nicoll (1897) suggested that the instruction to feed the girl is placed "in a more prominent position" in Luke than in Mark "to show that as she had been really dead, she was now really alive and well; needing food and able to take it". Frédéric Louis Godet remarks "on the calmness with which Jesus gave the order after such a stupendous event": "As simply as a physician feels the pulse of a patient He regulates her diet for the day". Getty-Sullivan (2001) pointed out that, rather than Mark/Luke's verb ἀνίστημι ("to stand up, to get up"), Matthew used the verb ἐγείρω ("to (a)rise") that is commonly connected to the resurrection of Jesus, suggesting that Matthew wanted to cast Jesus' miraculous revival of Jairus' daughter as a foreshadowing of what would later happen to Jesus himself.

== See also ==
- Life of Jesus in the New Testament
- Luke 8
- Ministry of Jesus
- Parables of Jesus
- Talitha (given name)
- Other depictions:
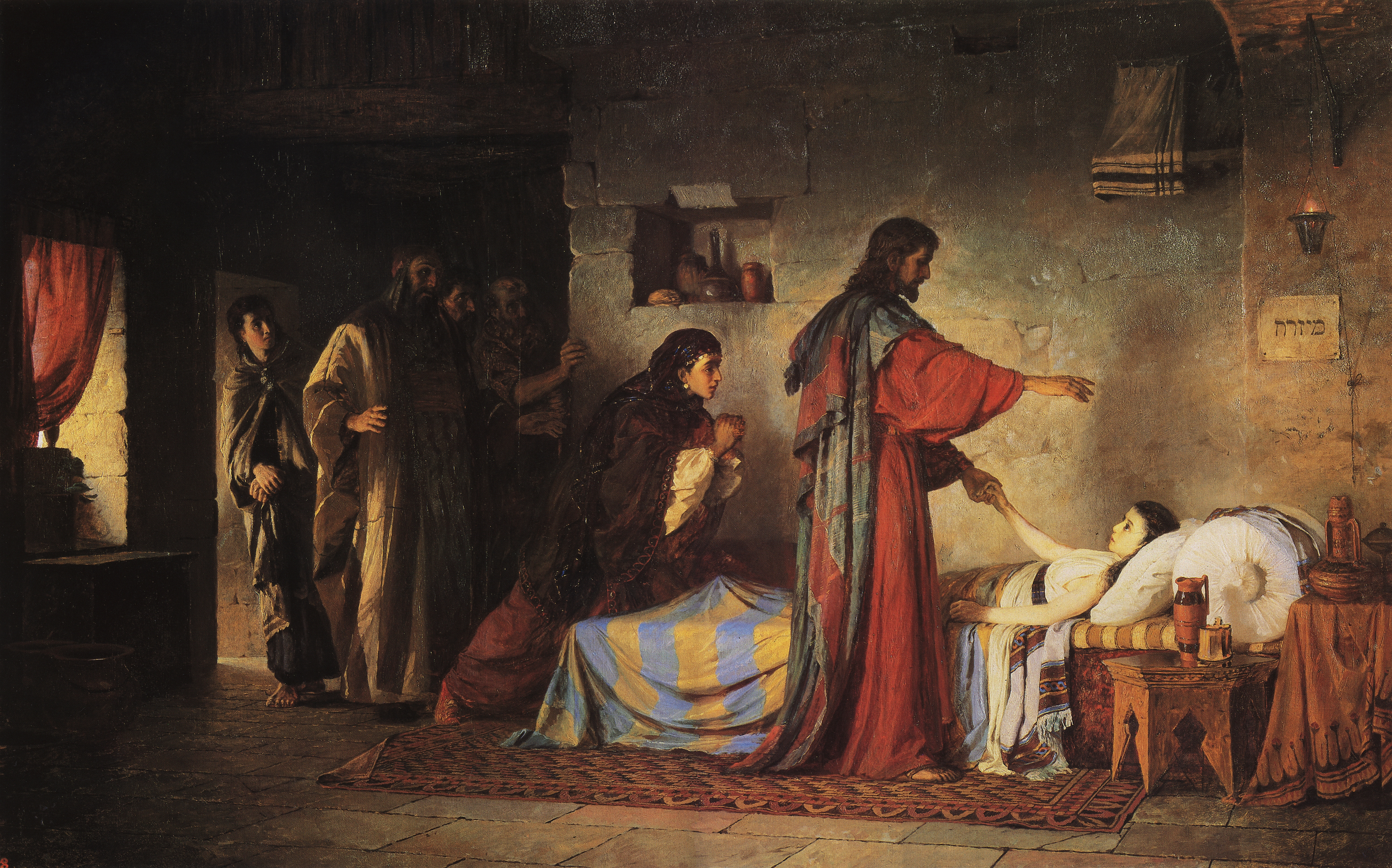
By Vasily Polenov, 1871

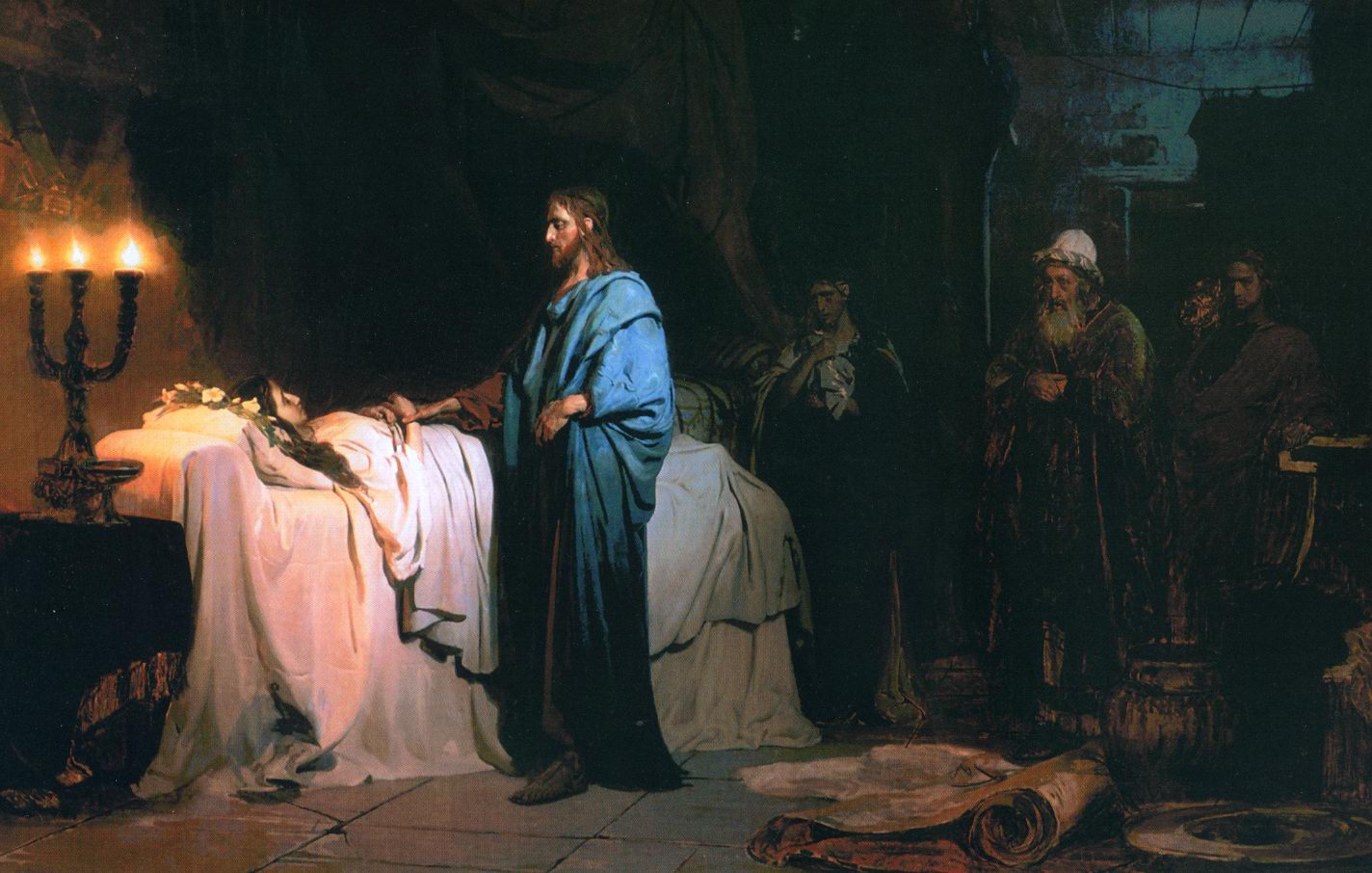
By Ilya Repin, 1871

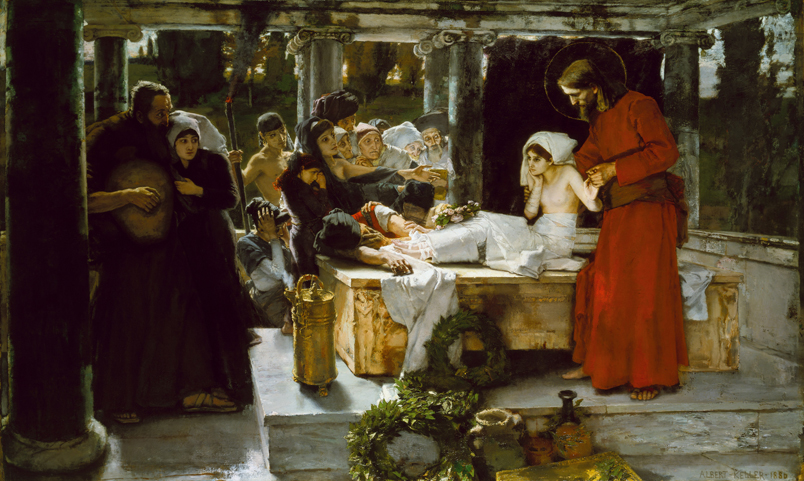
By Albert von Keller, 1886

Raising of Jairus' daughter Life of Jesus: Miracles
Preceded by Healing the Gerasene Demonic; Miracles of Jesus	New Testament; Events	Succeeded by Rejection of Jesus; Ministry of Jesus
