= New wine (disambiguation) =

New wine can refer to:

- New Wine, a Christian conference
- "New Wine into Old Wineskins", a phrase coined by Jesus, reported in several of the Gospels
- Federweißer, a partially fermented alcoholic beverage made from grapes
- An alternative title for the 1941 film The Great Awakening (film)
- New Wine, a song released in 2018 by "Hillsong Worship" on the album "There is More"
