= Talitha (given name) =

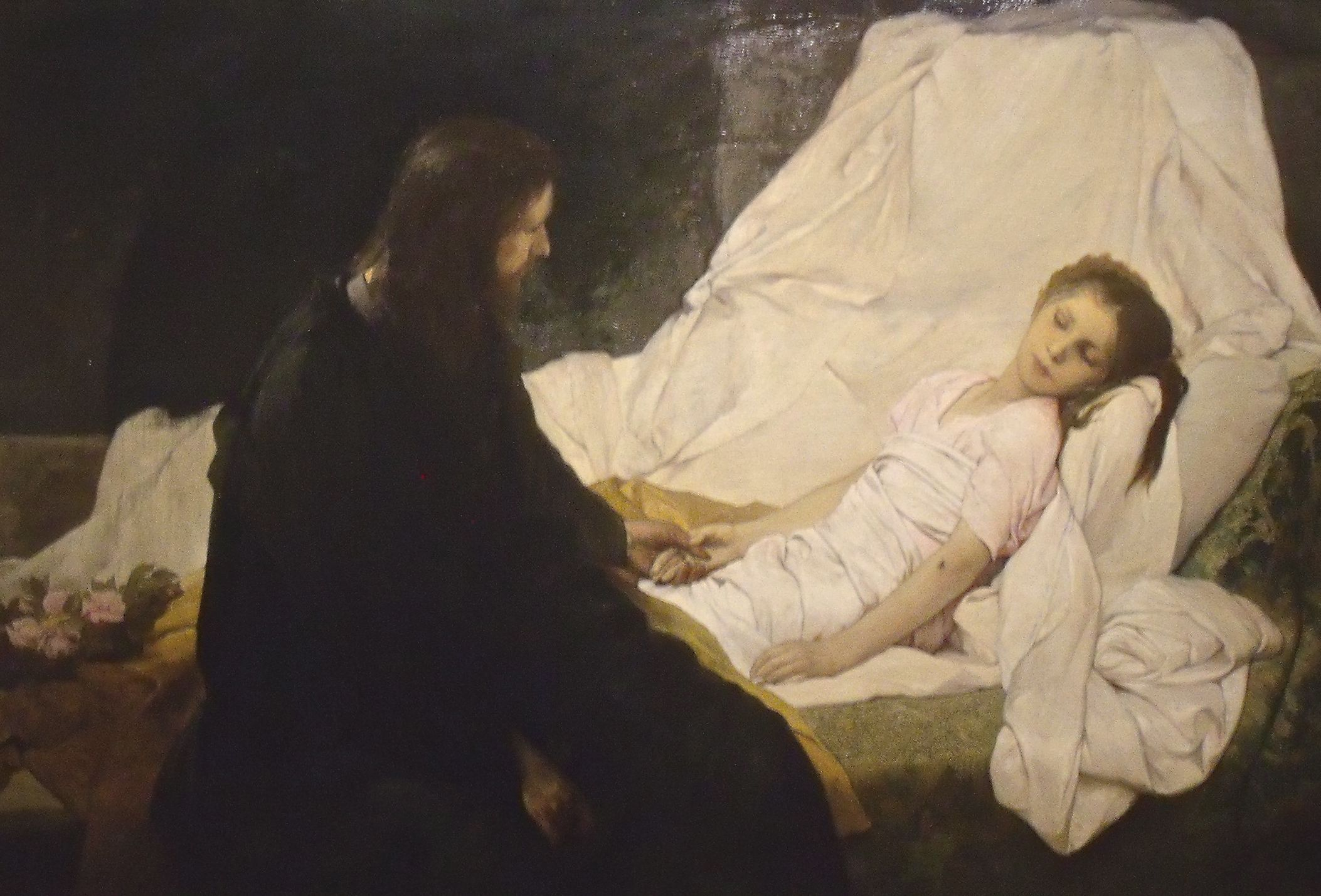
- Talitha is a name given in reference to the raising of the daughter of Jairus in the Gospel of Mark, depicted in this 1878 painting by Gabriel Max.
- Pronunciation: English: /təˈliː.θə/, English: /ˈtæl.ɪ.θə/, English: /ˈtɑːlˌiː.tɑː/
- Gender: female

Origin
- Origin: Aramaic
- Meaning: "little girl"

Talitha (Aramaic טליתא talitha "young girl") is an uncommon feminine name given in reference to the Biblical story in the Gospel of Mark in which Jesus Christ was said to have resurrected a dead child with the words "Talitha cumi" or "Talitha kum" or "Talitha koum," (Mark 5:41: Greek ταλιθὰ κούμ) often translated as "Little girl, I say to you, arise!"

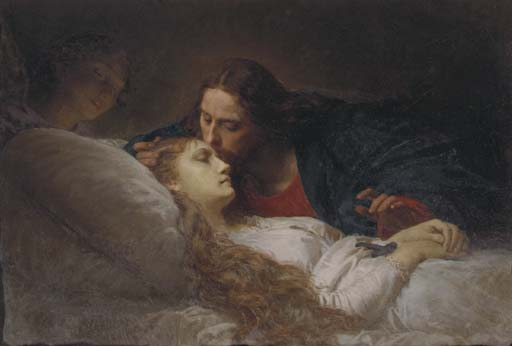
Raising of Jairus’s daughter by Ernesto Fontana

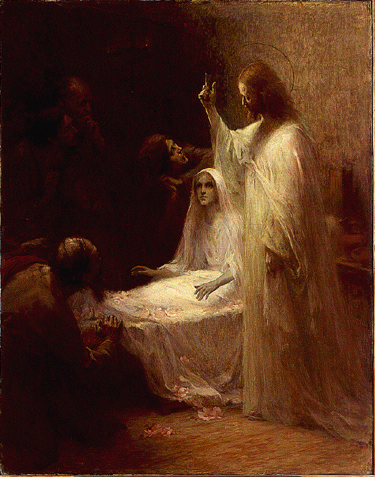
Resurrection of the daughter of Jairus, by Victor-Oscar Guétin, 1902

== Etymology ==
The word טליתא (talitha) has come to mean "young girl" in Aramaic, but its original meaning is likely "young lamb", a meaning preserved in Hebrew טַלְיָה (talya) "female lamb" (which gave the given name Talia), in the same way that the English word "kid" originally meant "young goat" and evolved into "young person" or "child". Like the word "kid" in English, depending on the context the word talitha could be used in Aramaic for young people of a wide variety of ages: the New Testament story applies to a "little child" (Greek: παιδίον in Mark 5:41), but various translations of the Old Testament (Peshitta, Pseudo Jonathan, Neofiti) also apply it to a girl of marriageable age: (Genesis 34:4) "Get me this damsel [=טליתא talitha] to wife."

Some sources say the Aramaic word could be translated as little lamb, while others say the word refers to a young girl. Literal translations of the Bible (Literal Standard, Young's Literal etc.) translate Talitha as damsel, maiden, or simply girl, rather than "little" girl.

== History of usage ==
It was among many names taken from the Bible that were used by Puritans in the American colonial era. Talitha Cumi Elderkin Stiles, a schoolteacher, born in Hartford, Connecticut in 1779, was one of only three original settlers of Cleveland who stayed there over the first winter of 1796–1797 when, attended by Seneca Native American women, she gave birth to Charles Stiles, the first white child born in the Western Reserve. Six decades later, eleven-year-old Talitha Dunlap was among the between 120 and 140 men, women and children who were killed during the 1857 Mountain Meadows Massacre. The name ranked 1,108 among names given to American girls born in 1881.

The name was also occasionally used in England by 1861, when the christening of a girl named Talitha-Cumi People was reported in The Times. It remains in occasional use in the United States and other countries. Sixty-eight newborn American girls were given the name in 2020, fifty-one newborn American girls were given the name in 2021, thirty-five newborn American girls were given the name in 2022, sixty newborn American girls were given the name in 2023, and forty-nine newborn American girls were given the name in 2024.

Eight newborn Canadian girls were called Talitha in 2021, nine Canadian girls were given the name in 2022, and seven Canadian girls were given the name in 2023.

In Brazil, Talita (or Talitha/Thalita) was the 100th most common name for newborn girls in 2009.

== Star name ==
While the personal name is most often derived from the Biblical story, Talitha is also the name of two stars, Talitha Borealis and Talitha Australis, in the constellation Ursa Major. The names of the stars are derived from the Arabic word for 'third' in the phrase القفزة الثالثة (al-qafzah al-thālithah) meaning 'The third leap [of the gazelle]', referring to an Arabic story about a startled gazelle which leapt three times to different points in the constellation.

== People ==
- Talitha Bateman (born 2001), American actress
- Talitha Cummins, Australian journalist
- Talitha Diggs (born 2002), American athlete
- Talitha Espiritu, Filipino author and academic known for her work on cinema during the Marcos dictatorship
- Talitha Gerlach (1896–1995), American YWCA worker who spent most of her life as a social worker in Shanghai, China
- Talitha Getty (1940–1971), Dutch actress, socialite, and model who was regarded as a style icon
- Talitha MacKenzie, Scottish-American world music recording artist, and historical dance and music teacher and performer
- Talitha Stevenson (born 1977), British author and journalist
- Talitha Washington (born 1974), American mathematician and academic
