= Calling of Matthew =

Episode in the synoptic gospels

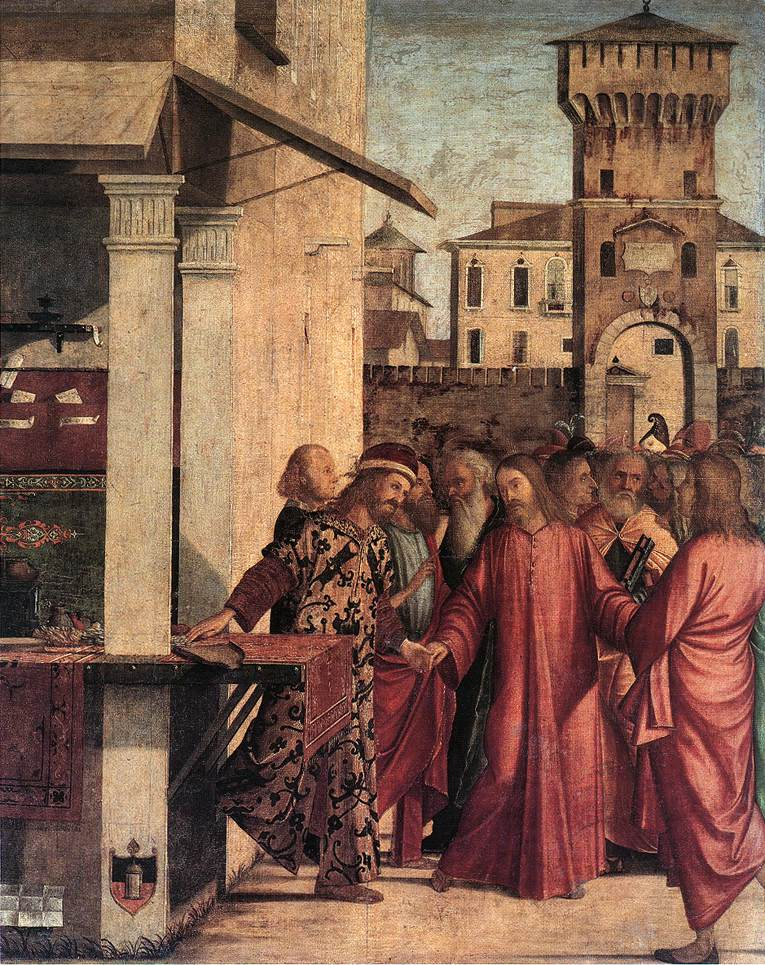
The Calling of St. Matthew, by Vittore Carpaccio, 1502.

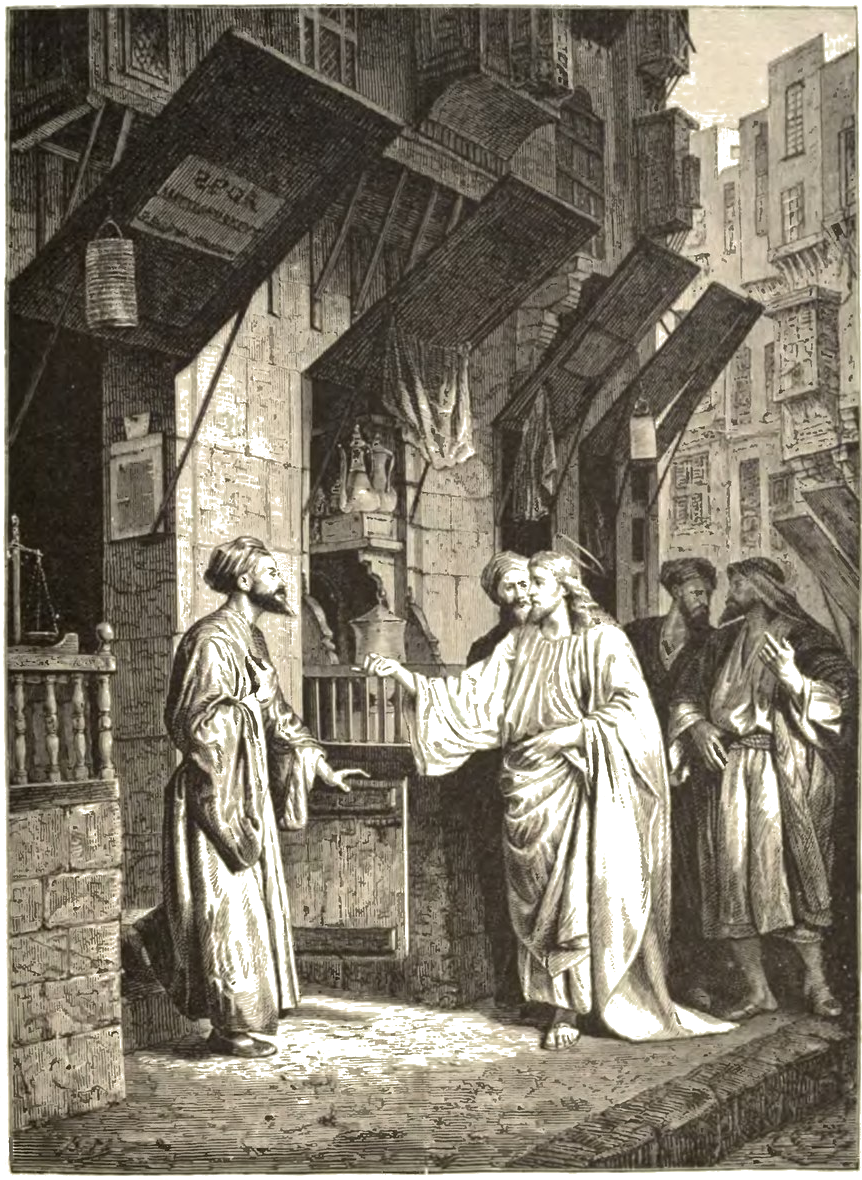
Calling of St. Matthew by Alexandre Bida, 1875.

The Calling of Matthew, also known as the Calling of Levi, is an episode in the life of Jesus which appears in all three synoptic gospels, Matthew 9:9–13, Mark 2:13–17 and Luke 5:27–32, and relates the initial encounter between Jesus and Matthew, the tax collector who became a disciple.

== Biblical narratives ==
According to the Gospel of Matthew: "As Jesus went on from there, he saw a man named Matthew sitting at the tax collector's booth. "Follow me", he told him, and Matthew got up and followed him."

A tax collector could be either an independent contractor with the Roman government, who paid a fee to Rome to obtain the right to extract taxes from the people in a certain area, with an added fee for the collector and his employees; or he might have also been a toll collector for Herod Antipas, Capernaum was an area with a high traffic of people and merchants. In any case, Levi-Matthew would have been a very unpopular individual.

The Biblical Greek: τὸ τελώνιον (to telōnion) is often translated as "the tax collector's booth" (e.g. NIV) or "tax office" (e.g. RSV). The King James Version says Matthew was "sitting at the receipt of custom". Wycliffe's translation was "sitting in a tollbooth", and the Expanded Bible suggests that the telōnion was "probably a tariff booth for taxing goods in transit".

In all three synoptic gospels, this episode takes place shortly after the miracle of healing the paralytic at Capernaum and is followed by Jesus' image of the danger of putting new wine into old wineskins. In the Gospels of Mark and Luke, the person called is called Levi, who was the son of Alpheus according to Mark (Luke does not mention Alpheus).

Also in all three synoptic accounts Jesus is then invited to a banquet, with a crowd of tax collectors and others. The Pharisees then complain:

29 Then Levi held a great banquet for Jesus at his house, and a large crowd of tax collectors and others were eating with them. 30 But the Pharisees and the teachers of the law who belonged to their sect complained to his disciples, "Why do you eat and drink with tax collectors and sinners?" 31 Jesus answered them, "It is not the healthy who need a doctor, but the sick. 32 I have not come to call the righteous, but sinners to repentance."

== Commentary ==
Roger Baxter reflects on Matthew's call in his Meditations, writing that:

Great was the force of this call, which was able to withdraw a man from his riches: and yet the same call, perhaps, would not be forcible enough to withdraw you from smaller impediments. Who can despair of salvation, when he sees public sinners taken out of a custom house, assumed not only to the friendship of God, but raised to the highest dignity of the apostleship." Truly, " His tender mercies are over all His works." (Ps. 144:9.)

Cornelius a Lapide in his commentary writes:

Thus then as a magnet draws iron unto it, so did Christ draw Matthew, and by His drawing, gave him his virtues, and chiefly his exceeding love of God, zeal for souls, ardour in preaching. Listen to the account of S. Matthew’s conversion, which he himself gave to St. Bridget of Sweden, when praying at his tomb at Malphi: “It was my desire at the time I was a publican to defraud no man, and I wished to find out a way by which I might abandon that employment, and cleave to God alone with my whole heart. When therefore He who loved me, even Jesus Christ was preaching, His call was a flame of fire in my heart; and so sweet were His words unto my taste, that I thought no more of riches than of straws: yea, it was delightful to me to weep for joy, that my God had deigned to call one of such small account, and so great a sinner as I to His grace. And as I clave unto my Lord, His burning words became fixed in my heart, and day and night I fed upon them by meditation, as upon sweetest food.”

== In art ==
The calling of Matthew has been the subject of works of art by several painters, including:

- The Calling of St Matthew by Caravaggio (1599–1600) at Contarelli Chapel in the church of San Luigi dei Francesi in Rome
- Hendrick ter Brugghen (1621)
- Juan de Pareja (1661).
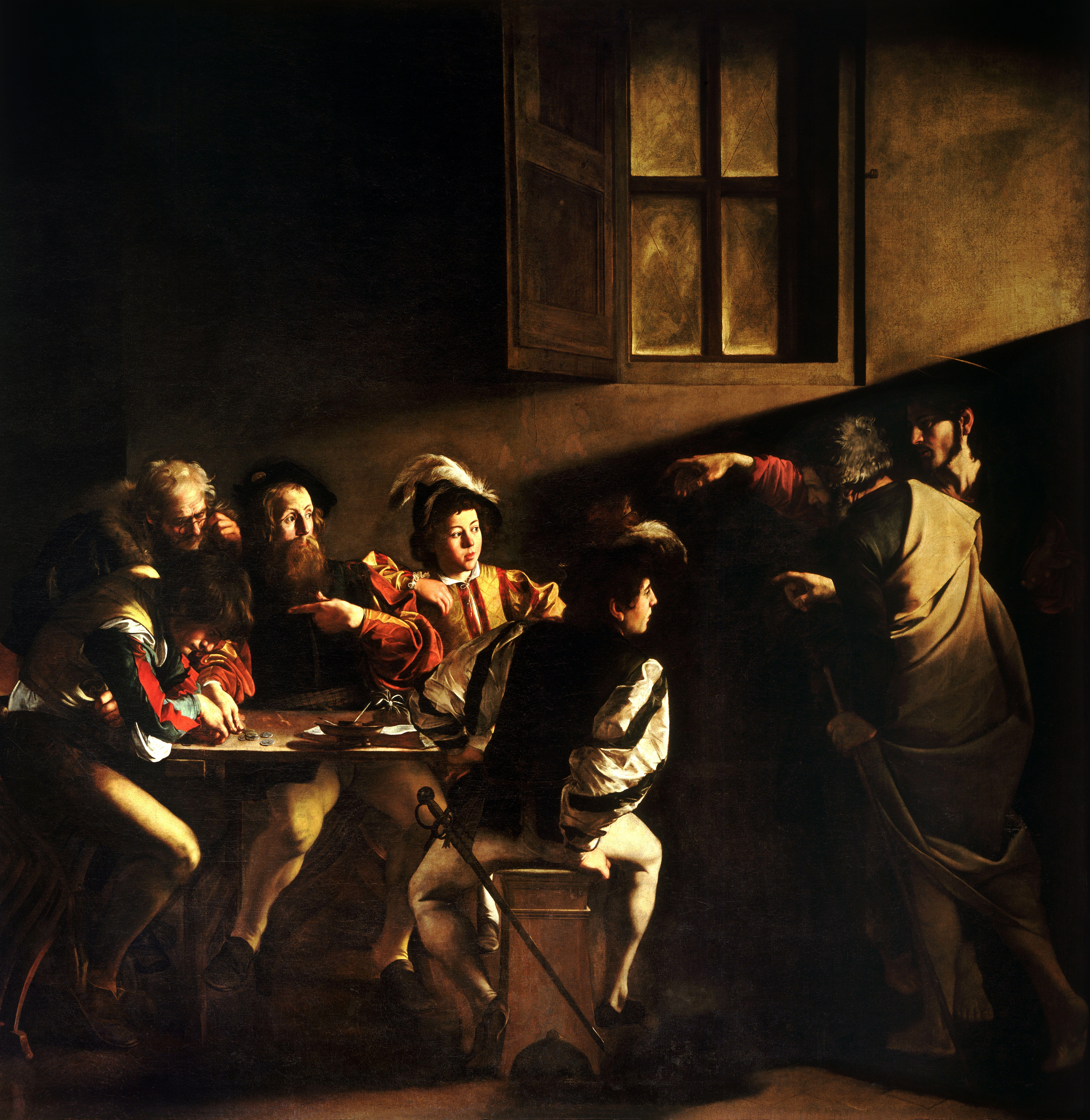
The Calling of Saint Matthew, by Caravaggio

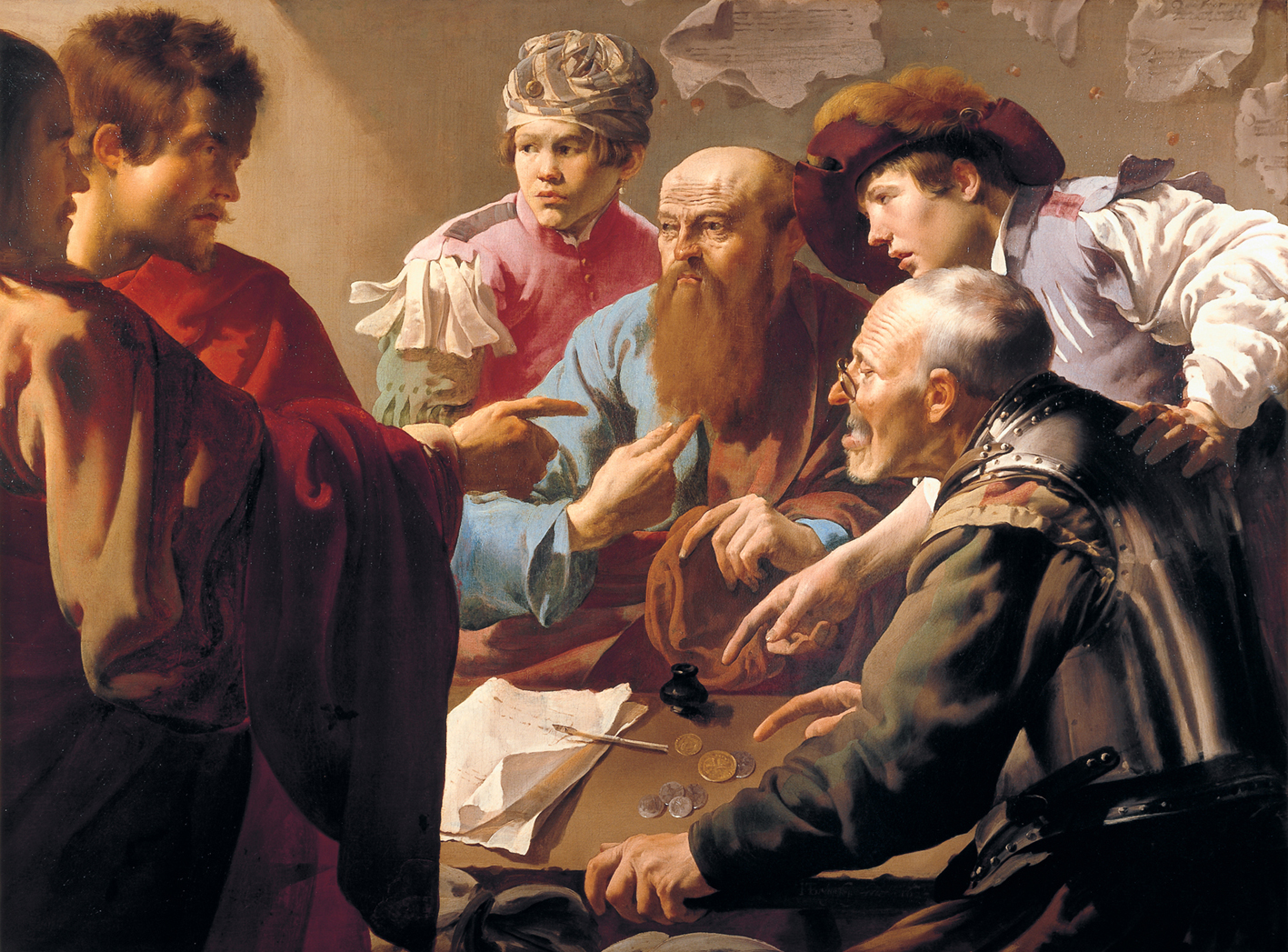
The Calling of St. Matthew, by Hendrick ter Brugghen

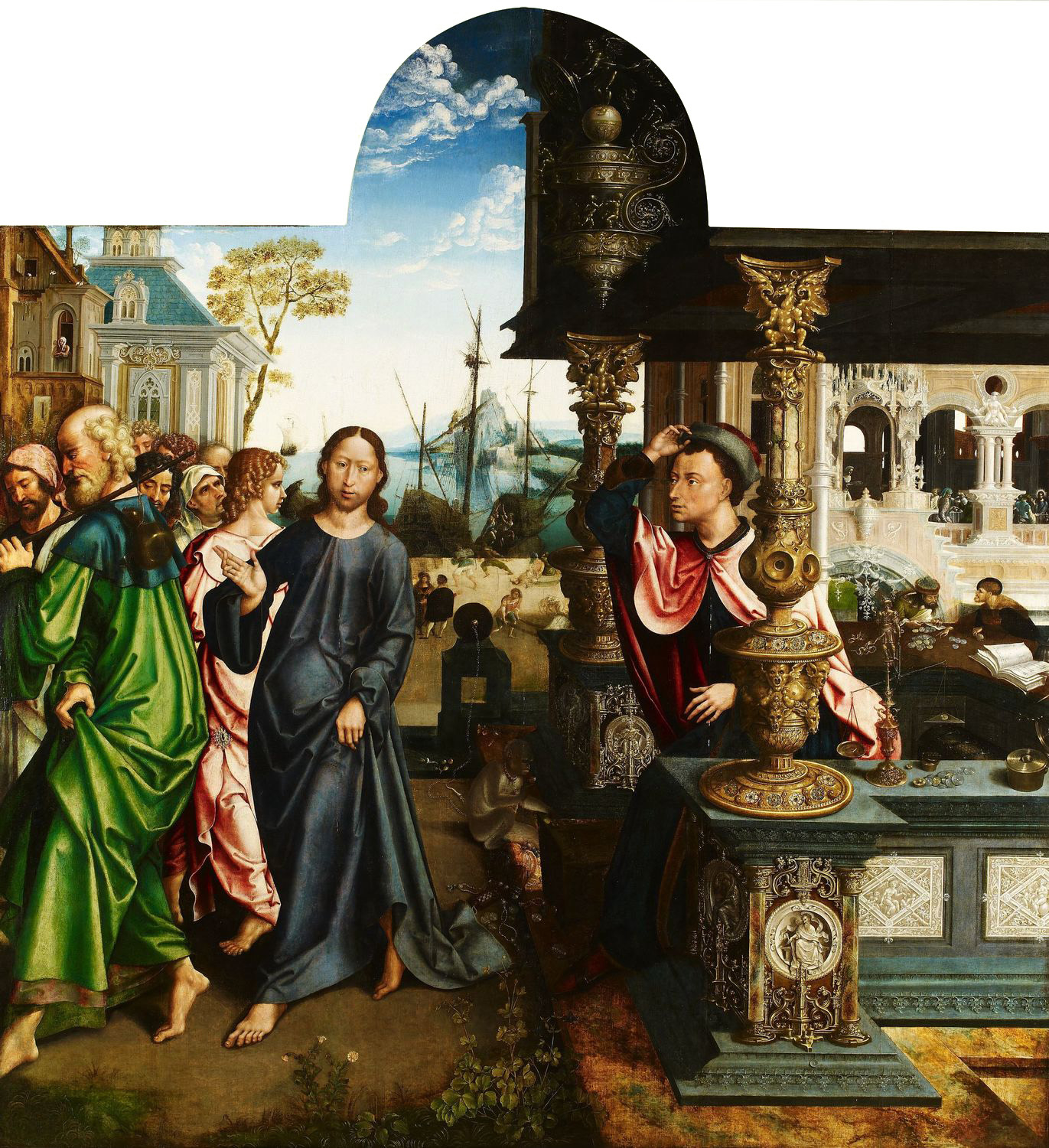
The Calling of St Matthew, by the Master of the Abbey of Dilighem

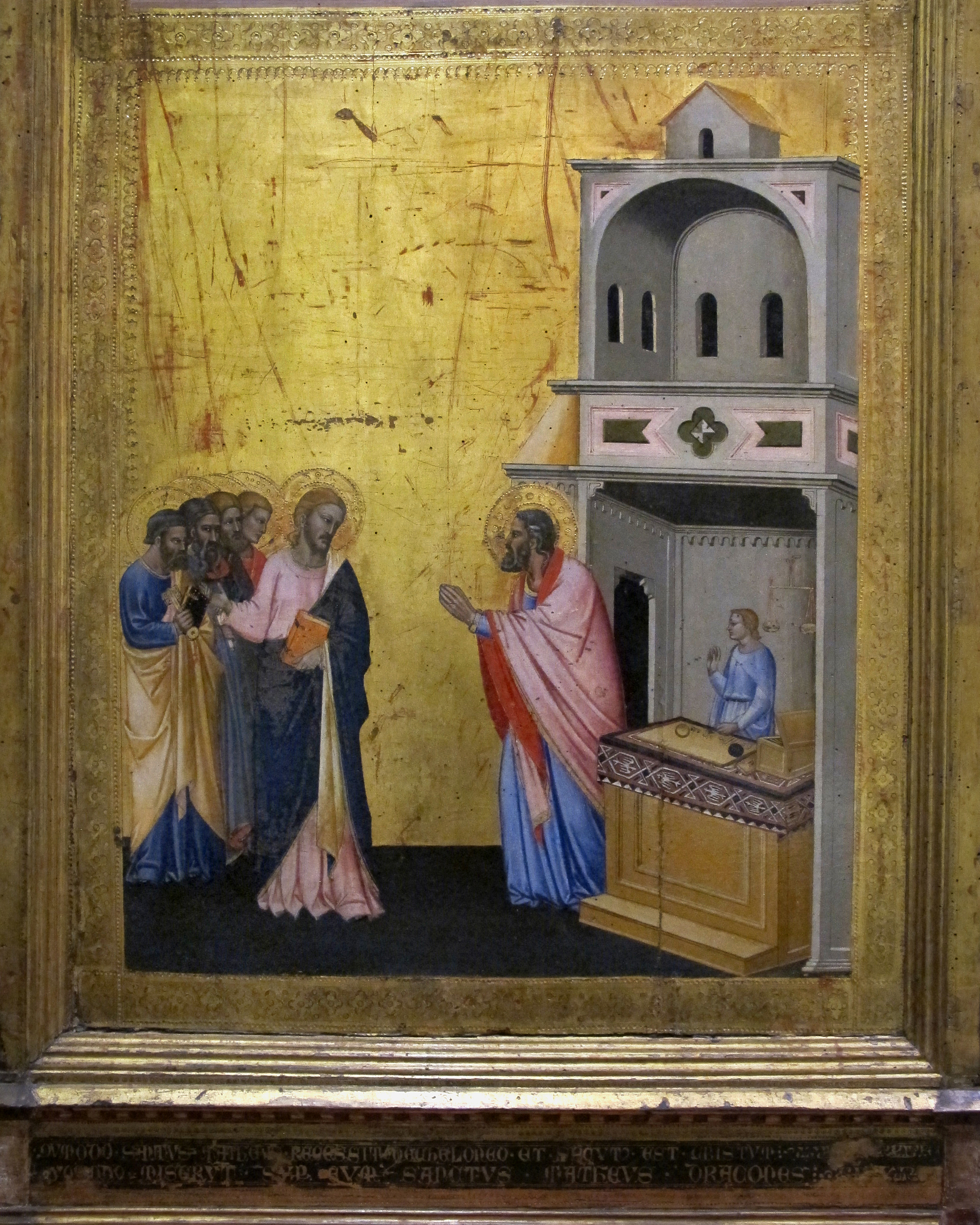
The Calling of St. Matthew, by Orcagna

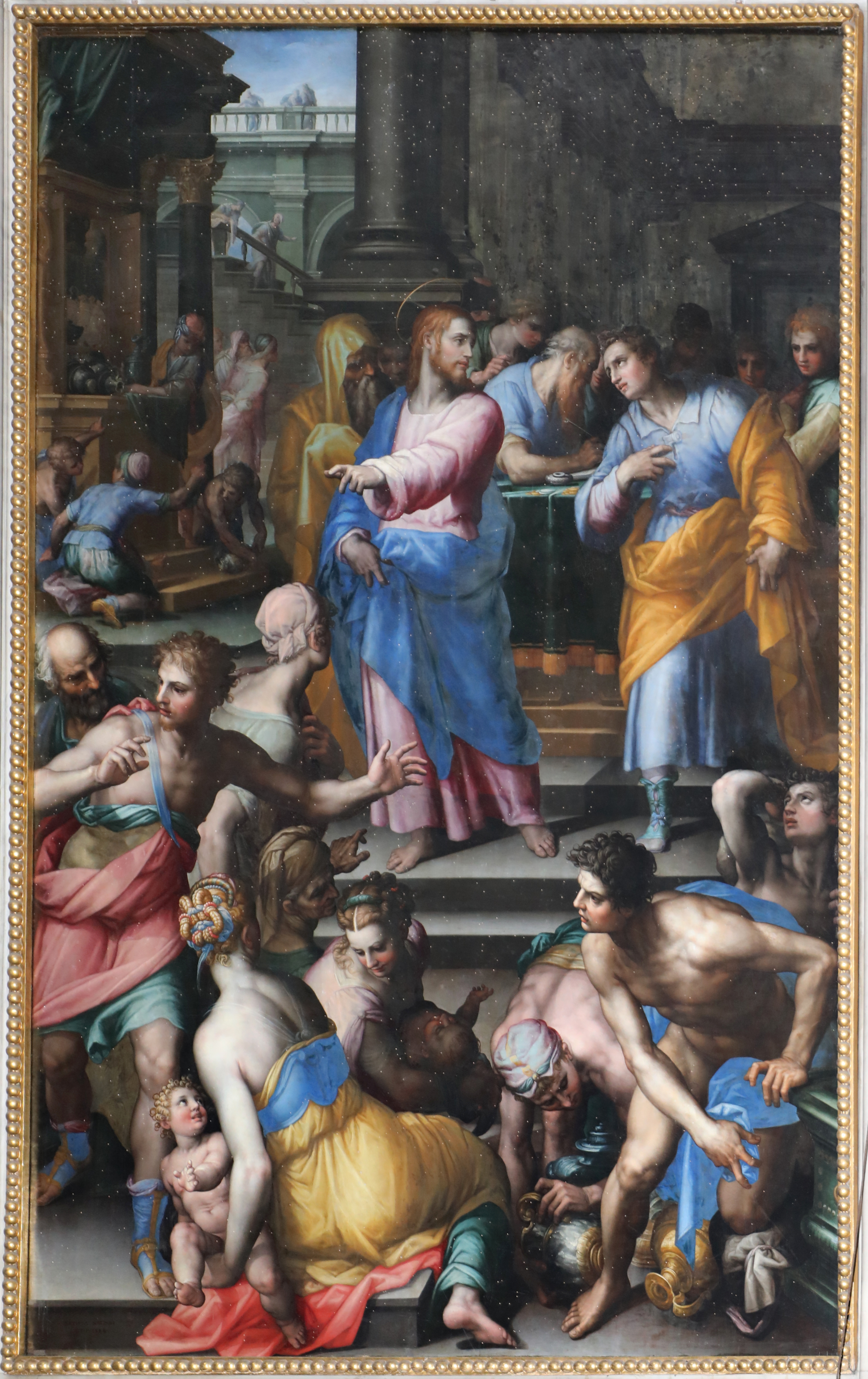
The Calling of St. Matthew, by Naldini

== See also ==
- Commissioning the twelve Apostles
- First disciples of Jesus
- Gospel harmony: Matthew 9, Mark 2, Luke 5
- Great Commission
- Life of Jesus in the New Testament
- Jesus eats with sinners and tax-collectors

Calling of Matthew Life of Jesus
Preceded by Hometown Rejection of Jesus, Physician, heal thyself	New Testament; Events	Succeeded by New Wine into Old Wineskins
