= Matthew 9:27 =

- ← 9:26 9:28 →
- Book: Gospel of Matthew
- Christian Bible part: New Testament

Matthew 9:27 is a verse in the ninth chapter of the Gospel of Matthew in the New Testament.

== Content ==
In the original Greek according to Westcott-Hort for this verse is:

Καὶ παράγοντι ἐκεῖθεν τῷ Ἰησοῦ, ἠκολούθησαν αὐτῷ δύο τυφλοί, κράζοντες καὶ λέγοντες, Ἐλέησον ἡμᾶς, υἱὲ Δαβίδ.

In the King James Version of the Bible the text reads:

And when Jesus departed thence, two blind men followed him, crying, and saying, Thou Son of David, have mercy on us.

The New International Version translates the passage as:

As Jesus went on from there, two blind men followed him, calling out, "Have mercy on us, Son of David!"

== Analysis ==
The blind men seem to believe that Jesus is the Messiah, who according to Isaiah 35:5; 61:1 is given the ability to heal the blind and cure diseases. Because the Messiah had been promised to be the Son of David. Various commentators have noted that although the eyes of the blind men were closed their minds were "sharp-sighted."

== Commentary from the Church Fathers ==
Jerome: " The miracles that had gone before of the ruler’s daughter, and the woman with the issue of blood, are now followed by that of two blind men, that what death and disease had there witnessed, that blindness might now witness. And as Jesus passed thence, that is, from the ruler’s house, there followed him two blind men, crying, and saying, Have mercy on us, thou Son of David."

Chrysostom: " Here is no small charge against the Jews, that these men, having lost their sight, yet believe by means of their heaving only; while they who had sight, would not believe the miracles that were done. Observe their eagerness; they do not simply come to Him, but with crying, and asking for nothing but mercy; they call Him Son of David, because that seemed to be a name of honour."

Saint Remigius: " Rightly they call Him Son of David, because the Virgin Mary was of the line of David."

Jerome: " Let Marcion and Manichæus, and the other heretics who mangle the Old Testament, hear this, and learn that the Saviour is called the Son of David; for if He was not born in the flesh, how is He the Son of David?"

Chrysostom: " Observe that the Lord oftentimes desired to be asked to heal, that none should think that He was eager to seize an occasion of display."

Preceded by Matthew 9:26	Gospel of Matthew; Chapter 9	Succeeded by Matthew 9:28
