= Luke 6 =

- ← chapter 5 chapter 7 →
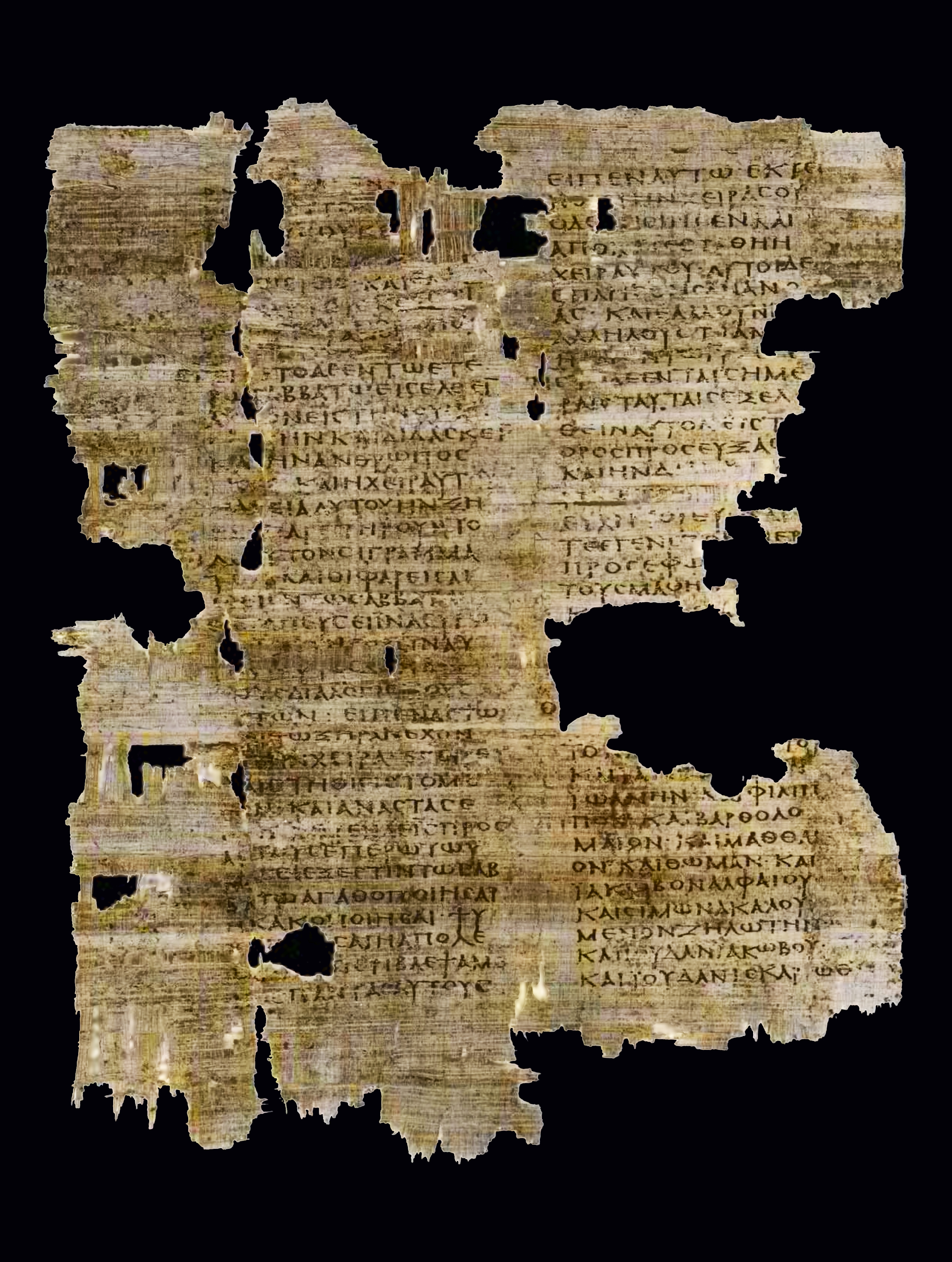
- Luke 6:4–16 on Papyrus 4 Fragment D, written about AD 150–175
- Book: Gospel of Luke
- Category: Gospel
- Christian Bible part: New Testament
- Order in the Christian part: 3

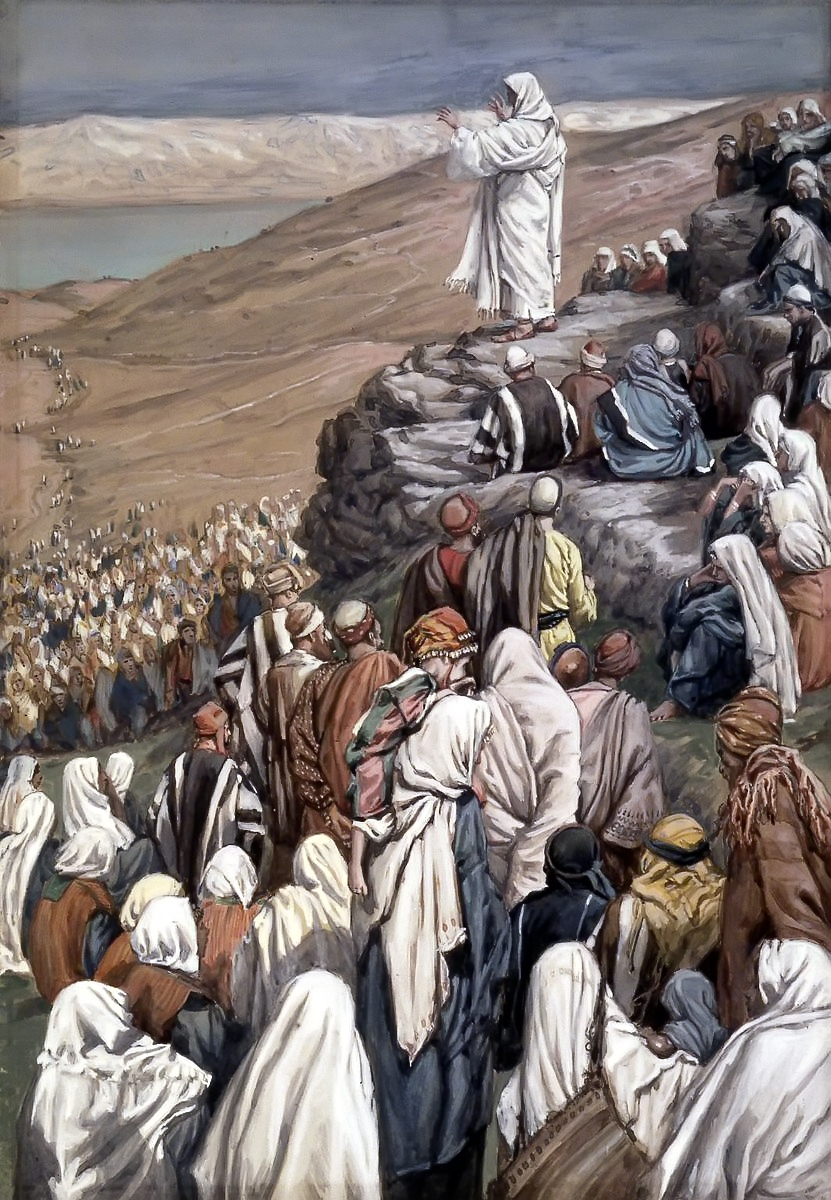
James Tissot, The Beatitudes Sermon, Brooklyn Museum, c. 1890

Luke 6 is the sixth chapter of the Gospel of Luke in the New Testament of the Christian Bible, traditionally attributed to Luke the Evangelist, a companion of Paul the Apostle on his missionary journeys. Jesus' teaching about the Sabbath enrages the religious authorities and deepens their conflict. The selection of twelve apostles is recounted and this is followed by the "Sermon on the Plain", where key aspects of Jesus' teaching are presented.

== Text ==
The original text was written in Koine Greek. This chapter is divided into 49 verses.

=== Textual witnesses ===
Some early manuscripts containing the text of this chapter are:

- Papyrus 4 (AD 150–175; extant verses: 1–16)
- Papyrus 75 (175–225)
- Codex Vaticanus (325–350)
- Codex Sinaiticus (330–360)
- Codex Bezae (~400)
- Codex Washingtonianus (~400)
- Codex Alexandrinus (400–440)
- Codex Ephraemi Rescriptus (~450)

== The Sabbath conflict (verses 1–11) ==
Luke relates two events which relate to Jesus' actions on the Sabbath and the differences between his teaching and that of the Pharisees regarding the significance of the sabbath day. These events lead to a widening conflict between Jesus and the religious authorities.

=== Lord of the Sabbath ===
This story is told in the synoptic gospels (Mark 2:23–28, Matt 12:1–8, Luke 6:1–5). Jesus' disciples are accused of breaking the Law (Exodus 20:8–11) by the Jewish authorities who see them pluck wheat, rub it and eat it during the Sabbath. Jesus invites his audience to recall the actions of David and his men who when hungry received the showbread (1 Samuel 21:1–6). Jesus indicates that he, the Son of Man, is the Lord of the Sabbath. Mark's text on the purpose of the Sabbath, The Sabbath was made for man, and not man for the Sabbath, is not repeated in Luke.

==== Verse 1 ====
One Sabbath day Jesus was walking through the grainfields. His disciples began to break off some heads of grain. They rubbed them in their hands and ate them.

Luke places the event at a specific date: Greek: εν σαββατω δευτεροπρωτω (en sabbatō deuteroprōtō), translated in the King James Version as "on the second Sabbath after the first". This phrase is not found elsewhere in the New Testament, and it is omitted in some ancient manuscripts, the New International Version and some other modern versions. Evangelical writer Jeremy Myers suggests this could have been the day of Shavuot (Festival of Weeks), which would give the action of Jesus an added significance. Only the priests were allowed to collect wheat and process it on the Sabbath to bake the showbread (which they could eat). Jesus extends this privilege to his disciples: in essence, in his teaching, priesthood is open to all. This action represents a radical departure from traditional ways and structures, and undermines the special status of the priests. In walking through the grainfields, Ambrose observes that Jesus' "very practice and mode of action" represent the absolution of his followers from the duty to follow the old law.

==== Verse 2 ====
But some of the Pharisees said, "Why are you doing what is not lawful to do on the Sabbath?"

F. W. Farrar, in the Cambridge Bible for Schools and Colleges, refers to "spy-Pharisees", a group who "dogged [Jesus'] steps as his ministry advanced". He thinks their initial plan might have been to see how far Jesus and his disciples walked, given the 2000 cubit rule which regulated travel on the Sabbath.

==== Insertion after verse 4 ====
The Codex Bezae Cantabrigiensis manuscript contains an additional verse which the Jerusalem Bible calls "interesting, but probably spurious":

When on the same day he saw a man doing work on the sabbath, he said to him: "Man! If you know what you are doing, you are blessed! But if you do not know it, you are accursed and a transgressor of the law."

The reference to knowledge suggests that this verse might reflect gnostic influence.

=== The healing on the Sabbath ===
The story is told in the synoptic gospels (Mark 3:1–6, Matthew 12:9–13, Luke 6:6–11). In a synagogue, Jesus calls forward a man with a withered hand on a Sabbath. The synagogue was possibly the one in Capernaum, but many commentators argue that "it is impossible to say where the synagogue was to which [the] Pharisees belonged". Healing him by the verbal command: "Stretch forth thy hand", Jesus challenges the priestly authorities. They do not argue with him directly, but are "filled with anger" (verse 11 in the New Life Version, NLV). On the Sabbath they begin to plot against Jesus, ignoring his question: "I will ask you one thing. Does the Law say to do good on the Day of Rest or to do bad? To save life or to kill?" (NLV).

== The choosing of the twelve apostles (verses 12–16) ==
After retreating in prayer on a mountain, Jesus chooses twelve apostles, according to Luke (Luke 6:12–16):

Simon (whom he named Peter), his brother Andrew, James, John, Philip, Bartholomew, Matthew, Thomas, James son of Alphaeus, Simon who was called the Zealot, Judas son of James, and Judas Iscariot, who became a traitor.

Jesus' habit of spending time in prayer is mentioned several times in Luke: 3:21, 5:15, here, 9:18, 9:29, and 22:41. The commissioning of the Twelve is also recounted in Matthew 10:1–4 and Mark 3:13–19.

== The Sermon on the Plain (verses 17–49) ==
The commissioning of the twelve apostles is followed by the portrayal of a multitude gathered from all Judea and Jerusalem, and from the seacoast of Tyre and Sidon, and then by a sermon that lays down key aspects of Jesus' teachings. In the parallel section of Matthew's gospel, the crowds are said to have come from Galilee, and from the Decapolis, Jerusalem, Judea, and beyond the Jordan. Mark's description is the most extensive of the three synoptic gospels: "a great multitude from Galilee followed Him, and from Judea and Jerusalem and Idumea and beyond the Jordan; and those from Tyre and Sidon". Farrar concludes "thus there were Jews, Greeks, Phoenicians, and Arabs among our Lord’s hearers".

=== The four beatitudes and the four woes (verses 20–26) ===
The sermon starts with a set of teachings about the four beatitudes and the four woes. The sermon may be compared with the more extensive Sermon on the Mount as recounted by the Gospel of Matthew. Both seem to occur shortly after the commissioning of the twelve apostles featuring Jesus on a mountain. In Luke, he delivers the sermon below the mountain at a level spot: Lutheran theologian Johann Bengel suggests perhaps half-way down the mountain: "a more suitable locality for addressing a large audience than a completely level plain". Some scholars believe that the Sermon on the Mount and the Sermon on the Plain are the same sermon, while others hold that Jesus frequently preached similar themes in different places. Luke will later relate the six woes of the Pharisees (Luke 11:37–44).

²⁰And he [Jesus Christ] lifted up his eyes on his disciples, and said, [1]‘Blessed be ye poor: for yours is the kingdom of God. [2]²¹Blessed are ye that hunger now: for ye shall be filled. [3]Blessed are ye that weep now: for ye shall laugh. [4]²³Blessed are ye, when men shall hate you, and when they shall separate you from their company, and shall reproach you, and cast out your name as evil, for the Son of man's sake.’

=== Love thy enemies (verses 27–36) ===
As a key teaching of Jesus, this saying follows immediately after the four beatitudes and woes. Jesus expands on the theme indicating that loving people who love you is nothing special, instead he challenges his listeners to love those who hate them, and asks his followers to be merciful like the Father. The section also contains what is considered the Golden Rule.

==== Verses 35–6 ====
³⁵But love your enemies, and do good, and lend, expecting nothing in return, and your reward will be great, and you will be sons of the Most High, for he is kind to the ungrateful and the evil. ³⁶Be ye therefore merciful, as your Father also is merciful.

"The ungrateful and the evil", or "the unthankful" and "the immoral". The base of the coffee and cocoa cups used by the In-N-Out Burger chain has the text "Luke 6:35", which refers to this verse.

=== Justice & sincerity, 37–42 ===
==== Judging others, 37–8 ====
Jesus delivers a warning not to judge others.

==== The blind leading the blind, 39–40 ====
This metaphor issues a warning that teaching needs to be done by leaders who are properly trained. It is also reported in Matthew 15:13–14.

==== A speck of sawdust, 41–2 ====
Jesus rebukes those who see faults in others and fail to examine themselves. Matthew relates the teaching as well (Matthew 7:3).

=== The tree and its fruit (verses 43–45) ===
Jesus offers a parable about testing a person. It is also related in Matthew 7:15–20.

=== The wise and foolish builders (verses 46–49) ===
This represents a teaching about placing one's life on the solid foundation provided by Jesus. It is also noted in Matthew 7:24–27.

== See also ==
- The Mote in God's Eye, a novel as a wordplay on 6:41–42 and Matthew 7:3–5
- Turning the other cheek

Preceded by Luke 5	Chapters of the Bible; Gospel of Luke	Succeeded by Luke 7
