= Codex Nitriensis =

Uncial 027
- New Testament manuscript
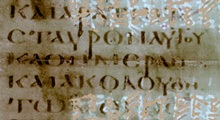
- Fragment with text of Luke 9:23
- Name: Nitriensis
- Sign: R
- Text: Gospel of Luke †
- Date: c. ~550
- Script: Greek
- Found: 1842
- Now at: British Library, Add MS 17211
- Size: 29.5 cm by 23.5 cm
- Type: Byzantine
- Category: V

Codex Nitriensis, designated by R or 027 (in the Gregory-Aland numbering), ε 22 (von Soden), is a 6th-century Greek New Testament codex containing the Gospel of Luke, in a fragmentary condition. It is a two column manuscript in majuscules (capital letters), measuring 29.5 cm by 23.5 cm.

== Description ==
The text is written in two columns per page, 25 lines per page, in large uncial letters. It has no breathings and accents. The letters are similar to those of codices 081, 022, and 024, only that they are somewhat irregular and straggling.

It is a palimpsest. The upper text contains the Syriac treatise Severus of Antioch against Johannes Grammaticus written in the 8th or 9th century. The lower text of the same manuscript contains the Iliad and the Gospel of Luke, both of the sixth century, and the Euclid's Elements of the seventh or eighth century.

The manuscript contains the tables of the κεφαλαια (tables of contents) before each Gospel, the Pseudo-Ammonian Sections, but no references to the Eusebian Canons.

== Contents ==
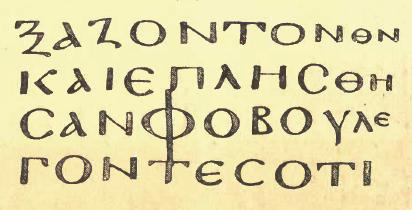
Luke 5:26 in Scrivener's facsimile

Gospel of Luke 1:1-13, 1:69-2:4, 2:16-27, 4:38-5:5, 5:25-6:8, 6:18-36, 6:39, 6:49-7:22, 7:44, 7:46, 7:47, 7:50, 8:1-3, 8:5-15, 8:25-9:1, 9:12-43, 10:3-16, 11:5-27, 12:4-15, 12:40-52, 13:26-14:1, 14:12-15:1, 15:13-16:16, 17:21-18:10, 18:22-20:20, 20:33-47, 21:12-22:6, 22:8-15, 22:42-56, 22:71-23:11, 23:38-51.

Iliad XII.273-471, end of book; XIII.133-265, 333-398, 465-530, 663-728, 797-837, end of book; XIV.1-20, 156-419; XV.158-223, 356-421, 491-557; XVI.199-264, 331-397, 664-731 798-862; XVIII.93-358, 426-492; XIX.136-268, 335-424, end of book; XX.1-172, 306-503, end of book; XXI.1-397, 465-611, end of book; XXIII.57-323, 457-589, 656-788, 856-897, end of book; XXIV.1-20, 285-483

== Text of the codex ==
The Greek text of Luke is a representative of the Byzantine text-type in a very early stage, with a large portion of non-Byzantine readings. Aland gave for it the following textual profile - 11^{1} 4^{1/2} 0^{2} 5^{s}. Aland placed it in Category V. According to the Claremont Profile Method it belongs to the textual family K^{x} in Luke 1 and Luke 10; in Luke 20 it has mixed text.

In Luke 6:2 — οὐκ ἔξεστιν (not lawful) for οὐκ ἔξεστιν ποιεῖν (not lawful to do); the reading is supported only by 𝔓^{4}, Codex Vaticanus, (Codex Bezae), 700, lat, cop^{sa}, cop^{bo}, arm, geo; It lacks Christ's agony at Gethsemane (Luke 22:43-44).

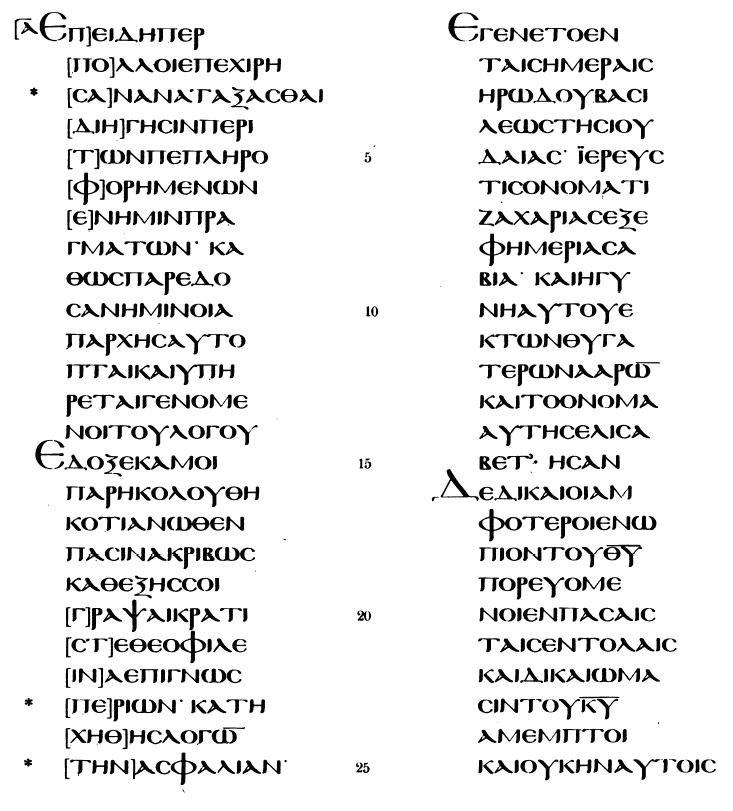
Luke 1:1-7 in Tischendorf's edition

William Cureton described what survives of the text of the Iliad as omitting 26 verses normally found while adding four not otherwise attested.

== History ==
Formerly it belonged to the monastery of St. Mary Deipara in the Nitrian Desert. In 1847 along with the other 550 manuscripts (e.g. British Library, Add MS 14448) it was brought to England by Henry Tattam.

The fragments of Luke were independently transcribed, both by Tregelles in 1854, and by Tischendorf in 1855, who afterwards re-examined the places wherein he differed from Tregelles (e.g. Luke 8:5; 18:1.10). Tischendorf edited the text of the codex in 1857 in his Monumenta sacra inedita, volume VII, with a facsimile.

The 48 extant parchment leaves of the manuscript are kept in the British Library (Add MS 17211) in London.

== See also ==
- List of New Testament uncials
- Biblical manuscript
- Textual criticism
