= Luke 5 =

- ← chapter 4 chapter 6 →
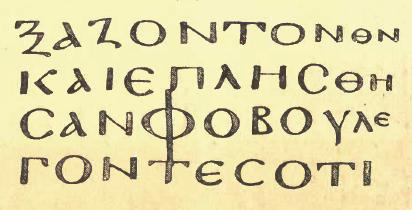
- Part of Luke 5:26 in Scrivener's facsimile of Codex Nitriensis, written about AD 550 (Note: and they glorified God and were filled with awe. Luke 5:26, New Revised Standard Version)
- Book: Gospel of Luke
- Category: Gospel
- Christian Bible part: New Testament
- Order in the Christian part: 3

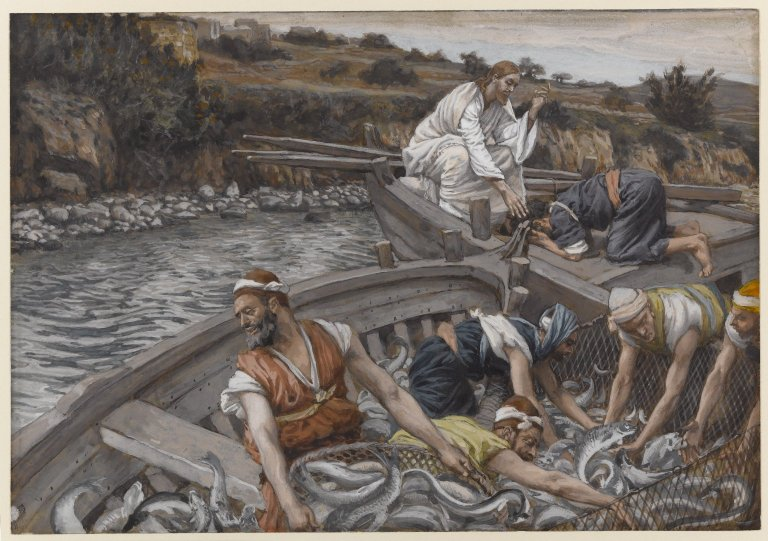
James Tissot, The Miraculous Draught of Fishes, Brooklyn Museum

Luke 5 is the fifth chapter of the Gospel of Luke in the New Testament of the Christian Bible, traditionally attributed to Luke the Evangelist, a companion of Paul the Apostle on his missionary journeys. The chapter relates the recruitment of Jesus' first disciples and continues to describe Jesus' teaching and healing ministry. Early criticism from the Jewish religious authorities is encountered as the chapter progresses.

== Text ==
The original text was written in Koine Greek. This chapter is divided into 39 verses.

=== Textual witnesses ===
Some early manuscripts containing the text of this chapter are:

- Papyrus 4 (AD 150–175; extant verses: 3–8, 30–39)
- Papyrus 75 (175–225)
- Codex Vaticanus (325–350)
- Codex Sinaiticus (330–360)
- Codex Bezae (~400)
- Codex Washingtonianus (~400)
- Codex Alexandrinus (400–440)
- Codex Ephraemi Rescriptus (~450)
- Codex Guelferbytanus B (5th century: extant verses 1–4).

== Catching fish and people: the first disciples (verses 1–11) ==
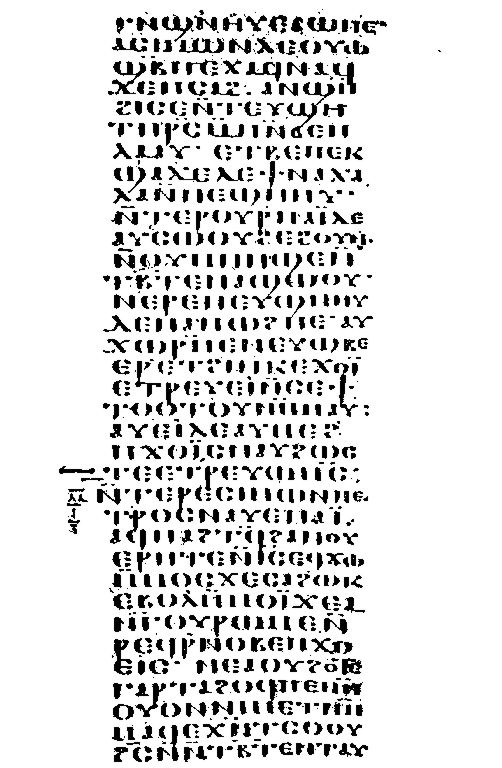
A section of a Coptic manuscript containing Luke 5:5–9 (8th century)

Verses 1–11 report the call of Jesus' first disciples. Jesus arrives at the Lake of Gennesaret, or Sea of Galilee. Biblical scholar William Smith suggests that "there was a beautiful and fertile plain called 'Gennesaret'" at the northwestern angle of the Sea of Galilee, and "from that was derived the name of 'Lake of Gennesaret'" used by Luke in Luke 5:1. According to Eric Franklin, Gennesaret was the district to the south of Capernaum, where Jesus' ministry in chapter 4 had been set.

Here Jesus proceeds to preach the "word of God" to the many listeners,(verse 1) using Simon's fishing boat as a platform. There were two boats there, the fishermen having worked in the lake were now washing their nets. Jesus chose Simon (Peter)'s boat: the other boat belonged to James and John. Johann Bengel sees an indication of the "priority" of Peter in Jesus' choice.

Afterwards he asks the fishermen to go out "into deep water" (verse 4) to start fishing again. They are reluctant, as they had been unsuccessful during the night before, but following his request they catch a large load and are amazed. Jesus then calls Simon (Peter) and his partners, James and John, the sons of Zebedee, into his ministry, and says to Simon: "From now on you (singular) will be catching people". Presbyterian writer Marvin Vincent notes that "both Matthew and Mark make the promise to be addressed to Peter and his companions; Luke to Peter alone".

The story of the calling of the first disciples is also told in Mark 1:16–20 and Matthew 4:18–22, although Matthew's account also includes Andrew, Simon's brother. The story is expanded by Luke, who links it to the miraculous catch of fish. Luke also has already revealed that Jesus had healed Simon's mother-in-law establishing a link between the two. Franklin notes an emphasis on Simon Peter's discernment of "the presence of God in Jesus", comparable to the prophet Isaiah's reaction to his vision of "the Lord of Hosts" in Isaiah 6:5:

Woe is me, for I am undone!
Because I am a man of unclean lips. (Isaiah 6:5)
Depart from me, Lord, for I am a sinful man. (Luke 5:8) (Note: These passages are aligned in the Revised Common Lectionary for use on the Fifth Sunday after Epiphany (Fifth Sunday in Ordinary Time), Year C.)

The calling of the first disciples is related in a different manner in John's Gospel, not in connection with the miraculous catch of fish, and with Andrew being the intermediary who brings Simon to Jesus.

In the final chapter of John's Gospel, the evangelist relates a later miraculous catch of fish, when the risen Jesus encounters seven of his disciples fishing again at the lake. At first, they do not recognize him. Then Jesus asks them to fish on the right side of the boat. They catch a large load and then recognize who he is.

== Healing of a leper (verses 12–14) ==
Jesus encounters a leper who falls on his face, beseeching him directly, "Lord, if thou wilt, thou canst make me clean" (verse 12b). Jesus touches him—an unusual gesture, as lepers were quarantined according to the Jewish Law (Leviticus 13–14)—and heals him: "be thou clean". Healing occurs in an instant. Jesus asks him to present himself to the priest. This will provide an official confirmation of the healing and, along with an offering, comply with the Law, "just as Moses commanded" (verse 14).

== Jesus' fame and his retreat (verses 15–16) ==
Jesus is now followed by many who listen to him and want to be healed. Luke comments that he often retreated into the wilderness to pray. Jesus' habit of spending time in prayer is mentioned several times in Luke: 3:21, here, 6:12, 9:18, 9:29, and 22:41. John Gill notes that he "withdrew" to "rest from the fatigues of preaching and healing diseases", and (also) prayed.

== Healing of the paralyzed man (verses 17–26) ==
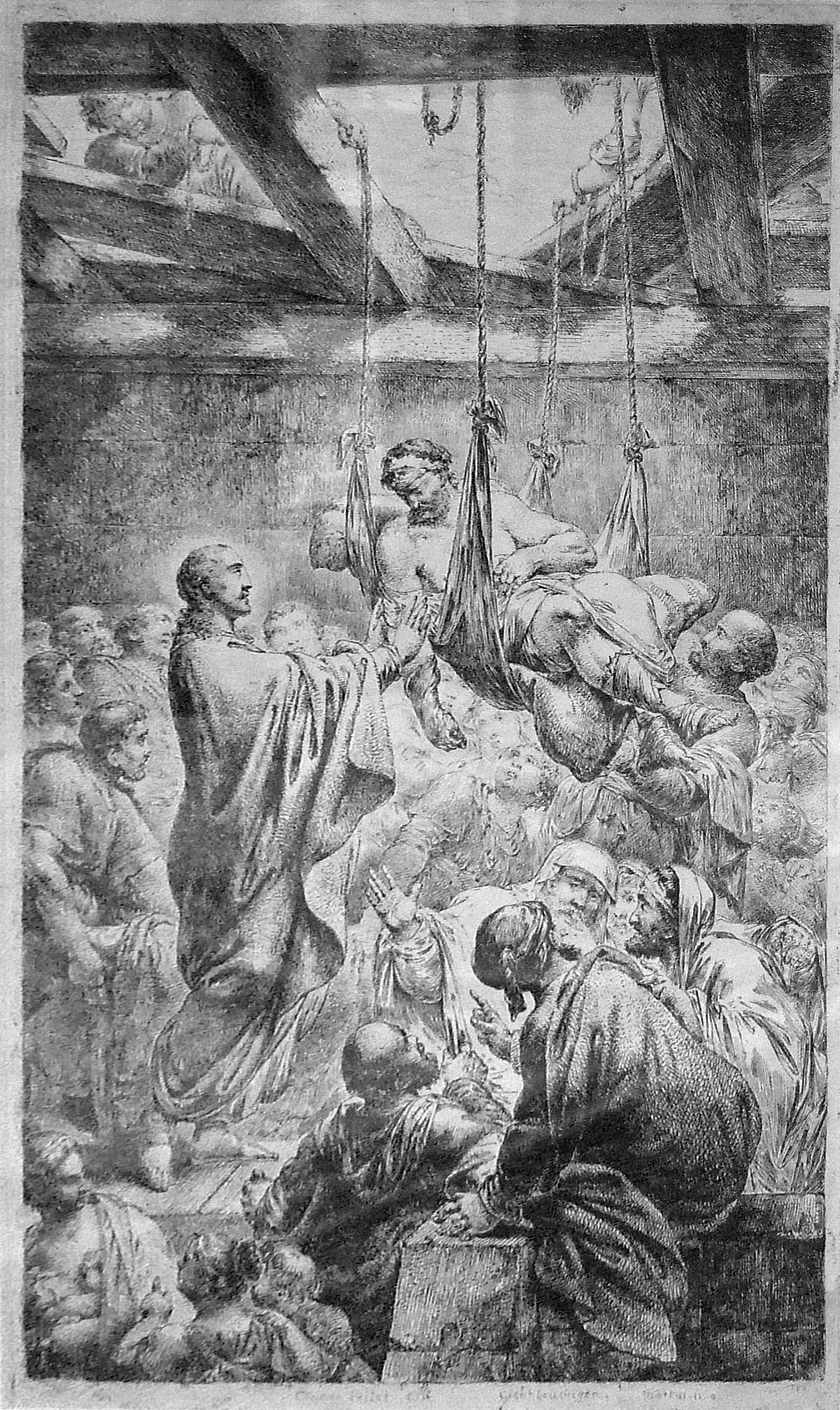
Christ healing the paralytic at Capernaum by Bernhard Rode, 1780

Jesus is teaching in a house with Pharisees and teachers of the Law in attendance. Luke points out that the members of the religious authorities come from Galilee, Judea, and Jerusalem. There is a paralyzed man and his friends bring him to Jesus, by lowering him from above through the roof of the house. When Jesus sees the faith of his friends, he declares that his sins are forgiven. In the eyes of the religious authorities, Jesus' act of forgiveness represents blasphemy. He knows their thoughts and challenges them: which is easier, to forgive sins or to heal? (Anybody can say he forgives sins.) Jesus then commands the man to get up, take his mat, and go home. Jesus' instantaneous healing proves his authority to forgive sins. The people praise God, but with the seemingly silent presence of the religious authorities Luke has started to set the stage for the growing conflict. This story is also related in Mark 2.

In John 5, Jesus also heals a paralyzed man (at the pool of Bethesda), which brings him into conflict with the religious authorities, because the healing takes place on the Sabbath.

== The calling of Levi (verses 27–32) ==
Jesus calls on Levi, a tax collector, to follow him. Levi does so immediately. Later he arranges for a big feast for Jesus and other tax collectors are in attendance. Pharisees and some teachers of the law complain that Jesus is feasting with tax collectors and other outcasts. Tax collectors are despised as they collaborate with the Romans and tend to enrich themselves. Jesus' answer is that people who are healthy do not need a doctor, he has come to help those who need to repent. This event is also related in Mark 2:13–17 and in Matthew 9:9–13 (where the tax collector is called Matthew).

== About fasting (verses 33–35) ==
Criticism arises about the conduct of Jesus' disciples, their lack of fasting and praying—in contrast to the disciples of John the Baptist and those of the Pharisees, they eat and drink instead. In reply, Jesus likens himself to a bridegroom and his disciples to guests of the wedding feast. Now, while he is still with them, is the time to celebrate, but he also, for the first time in his ministry, points to his death. Fasting will be appropriate when he has departed: in Acts 13:2–3 "we are told that they did fast".

== A double parable (verses 36–39) ==
The response to the criticism about fasting is immediately followed by a double parable. Jesus compares "old" and "new": firstly, a new patch of garment is not fit for an old garment, and secondly, new wine is not fit for old wineskins. The reasons are clear: tearing a new piece of clothing to fix an old clothing would destroy the new one and may not fit, and using old wineskins that have already been stretched by use may not accommodate new wine that will expand the old wineskin beyond its limits during fermentation: they burst and all is lost. The parable is also recounted in Matthew 9:14–17 and Mark 2:21–22, but only Luke uses the term παραβολὴν, (parabolēn, a parable) in his account.

A traditional interpretation of the double parable is that Jesus' new teaching cannot be accommodated by the old patterns of thought: His ministry differs from the Jewish tradition. This interpretation of the incompatibility of the "New" and the "Old" may date back to Marcion and has also been used as an argument by later reformers within the Church.

=== Verse 39 ===
And no one, having drunk old wine, immediately desires new; for he says, 'The old is better'.

Jesus proceeds to declare that old wine is usually preferred to new wine – "the old [wine] is better" – a comment not found in the other two synoptic gospels. This verse gives rise to some difficulty in interpretation. If Jesus is teaching a separation from Judaism, would he say that the old is better? A number of explanations have been given. One view holds that the line does not belong here and should be disregarded or removed, a view taken by Marcion. Another view proposes that Jesus is just pointing out that old and familiar patterns are hard to shed. Another explanation suggests that Jesus is trying to save the Old, and the New refers to the teachings of his critics. Other explanations retranslate the Greek original words differently in an attempt to make sense of the statement.

A different approach is the proposal not to assume that Jesus is talking about "old" and "new" religious teachings, but about his ways of choosing disciples. So Jesus uses new methods (new clothes) to provide new men (wineskins) with a new message (wine). He does not reject the "Old", but the "Old" is limited and not accessible to everybody. As he starts his ministry he demonstrates that his reach is inclusive, thus he finds the sinners, the rejected, the poor and the sick.

The interpretation favored by John Calvin looks at old garments and old wineskins as representations of Jesus' disciples. In his Commentary on Matthew, Mark, and Luke he explains that the new wine and unshrunk cloth represent the practice of fasting twice a week. Fasting this way would be burdensome to the new disciples, and would be more than they could bear.

== See also ==
- Fish
- Tax collector
- Wine

== Notes ==
Preceded by Luke 4	Chapters of the Bible; Gospel of Luke	Succeeded by Luke 6
