= Papyrus 4 =

New Testament papyrus fragment of the Gospel of Luke in Greek, 3rd–4th century AD

- New Testament manuscript
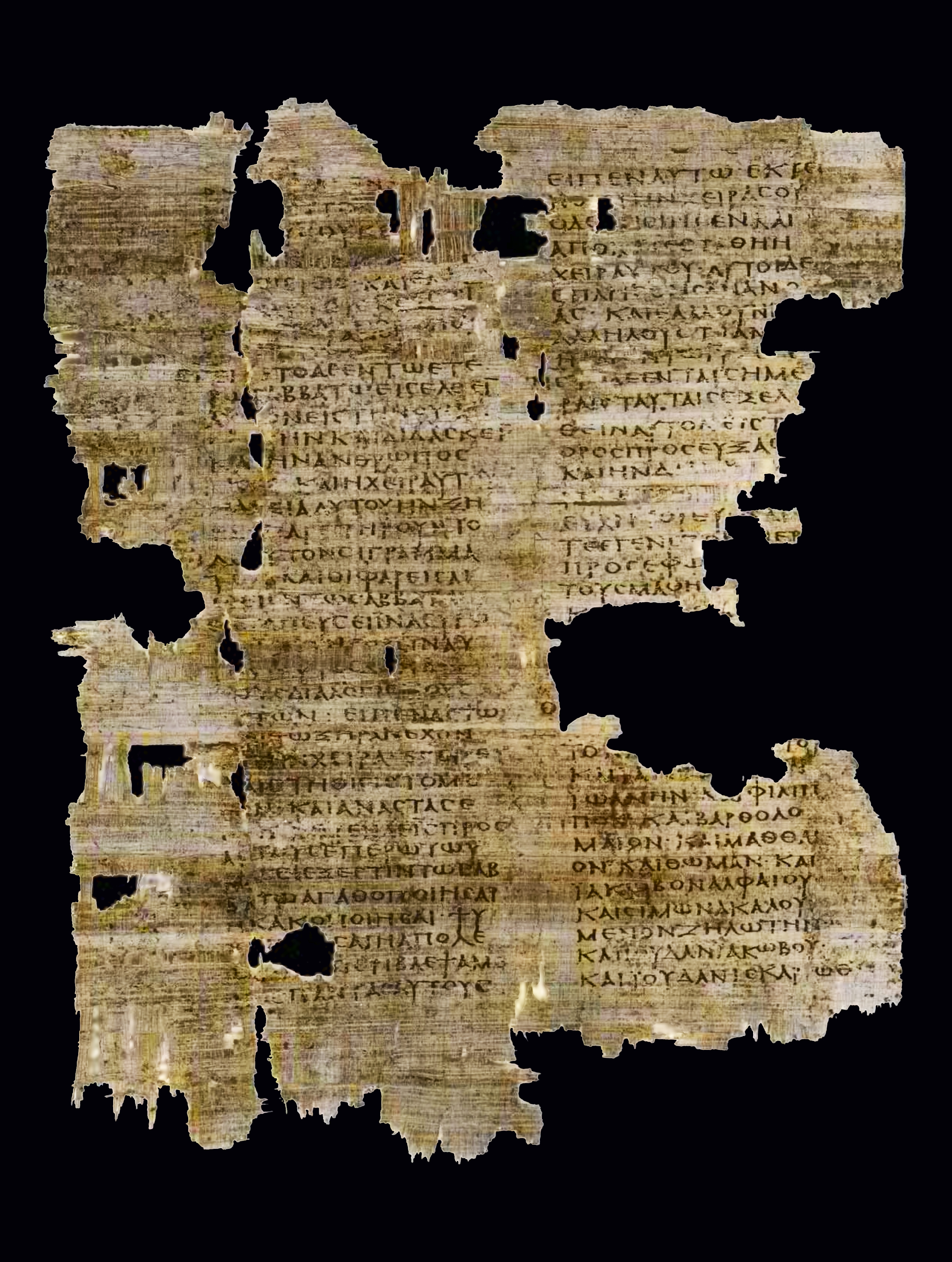
- Luke 6:4–16
- Name: Supplement Grec 1120
- Sign: 𝔓^{4}
- Text: Luke 1:58-59; 1:62-2:1; 2:6-7; 3:8-4:2; 4:29-32; 4:34-35; 5:3-8; 5:30-6:16
- Date: c. 150-300
- Script: Greek
- Found: Coptos, Egypt
- Now at: Paris, Bibliothèque Nationale, Suppl. Gr. 1120
- Type: Alexandrian text-type
- Category: I

Papyrus 4 (𝔓^{4}, part of Suppl. Gr. 1120) is an early New Testament papyrus of the Gospel of Luke in Greek. Opinions differ as to its age. It has been dated anywhere from the late second century to the fourth century.

== Description ==
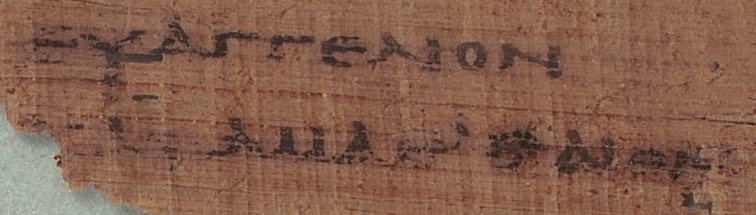
Fragment of a flyleaf with the title of the Gospel of Matthew, ευαγγελιον κ̣ατ̣α μαθ᾽θαιον (euangelion kata Maththaion). Dated to late 2nd or early 3rd century, it is the earliest manuscript title for Matthew and one of the earliest manuscript titles for any gospel (along with John's 𝔓^{66} and 𝔓^{75}).

It is one of the earliest manuscripts (along with 𝔓^{75}) of the Gospel of Luke and contains extensive sections of its first six chapters. It is currently housed in the Bibliothèque nationale de France (Suppl. Gr. 1120) in Paris.

It contains texts of Luke: 1:58–59; 1:62–2:1; 2:6–7; 3:8–4:2; 4:29–32, 34–35; 5:3–8; 5:30–6:16

The Greek text-type of this codex is a representative of the Alexandrian. Aland placed it in Category I. There is agreement with 𝔓^{75} in 93%.

Notable readings

In Luke 6:2 — οὐκ ἔξεστιν (not lawful) for οὐκ ἔξεστιν ποιεῖν (not lawful to do); the reading is supported only by Codex Vaticanus Graecus 1209 (Codex Bezae), Codex Nitriensis, 700, lat, cop^{sa}, cop^{bo}, arm, geo;

Some early accounts stated that 𝔓^{4} was used as stuffing for the binding of a codex of Philo, written in the late third century and found walled up in a house at Coptos. Apparently this account was incorrect, however, as the fragments were actually found stashed between pages of the codex of Philo, not in the binding.

Philip Comfort and David Barret in their book Text of the Earliest NT Greek Manuscripts argue that 𝔓^{4} came from the same codex as 𝔓^{64+67}, the Magdalen papyrus, and date the texts to 150–175. Willker tentatively agrees stating 'The [3rd century] dating given is that of NA. Some date it into the 2nd CE (e.g. Roberts and Comfort). This is quite probable considering the use as binding material for a 3rd CE codex'. Comfort and Barret also show that 𝔓^{4} and 𝔓^{64+67} have affinities with a number of late 2nd century papyri. Roberts (1979), Skeat (1997), Willker and Stanton also date the text to the late 2nd century, leading Gregory to conclude that '[t]here is good reason to believe that 𝔓^{4} ... may have been written late in the 2nd century...'. Frederic Kenyon dated 𝔓^{4} to the fourth century. In 2018, Brent Nongbri argued that it was not possible with current knowledge to date 𝔓^{4} to a specific century, and that any dates from the 2nd to 4th centuries were equally reasonable. Charlesworth has concluded 'that 𝔓^{64+67} and 𝔓^{4}, though written by the same scribe, are not from the same ... codex.'

== See also ==
- List of New Testament papyri
- Luke 1–6
