= Healing the two blind men in Galilee =

Miracle carried out by Jesus according to the Bible

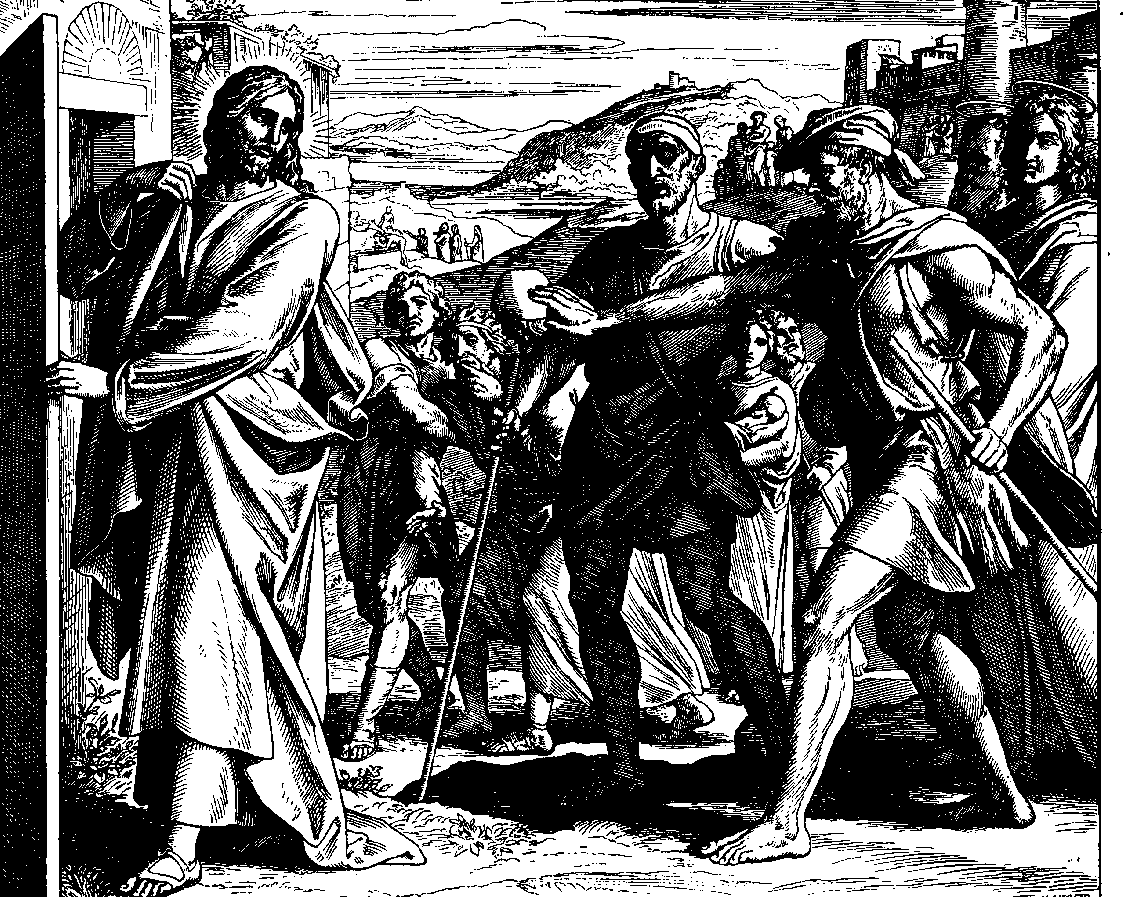
Christ and the two blind men by Julius Schnorr, 19th century

Jesus healing two blind men is a miracle attributed to Jesus in the Gospel of Matthew. It follows immediately on the account of the Daughter of Jairus.

== Narrative ==
According to the Gospel account in Matthew 9:27-31, as Jesus continues his journey after raising the daughter of Jairus, two blind men follow him, calling out, "Have mercy on us, Son of David!" When he had gone indoors, the blind men come to him, and he asks: "Do you believe that I am able to do this?" They reply, "Yes, Lord". He then touches their eyes, and says, "According to your faith let it be done to you"; and their sight is restored. He warns them sternly, to tell nobody, but they go and spread the news of the healing 'throughout that district'.

== Development ==
The story is sometimes thought of as a loose adaptation of one in the Gospel of Mark, of the healing of a blind man called Bartimaeus, but in fact is a different story, The healing of Bartimaeus takes place near Jericho, involves two men who call out from the roadside as Jesus passes by, and comes later in Matthew 20:29-34. In Matthew 9, the healing of two blind men occurs when they follow him into a house just after Jesus heals Jairus's daughter in Capernaum.

== Significance ==
The author of the Matthew Gospel introduces the term 'Son of David' to indicate that the healings show Jesus as the Messiah.

This is confirmed by Cornelius a Lapide, where he comments on this passage, writing:

These blind men had conceived the hope of recovering their sight from Christ from the many and great miracles which they had heard were done by Him. Therefore they said, Have mercy upon us, pity our blindness, which is the greatest misery, and restore to us the light of the sun. We believe that Thou art the Son of David, that is, the Messiah, to whom this healing of blindness and other diseases has been promised by the Prophets. (Is. 35:5; 61:1.) For Messiah had been promised to David as his Son, that He should be sprung from his posterity. Wherefore Messiah was always called by the Jews, the Son of David. Therefore these men, whose bodily eyes were blind, had sharp-sighted minds...

== See also ==
- Life of Jesus in the New Testament
- Miracles of Jesus
