= New Wine into Old Wineskins =

Parable taught by Jesus of Nazareth according to Christian gospels

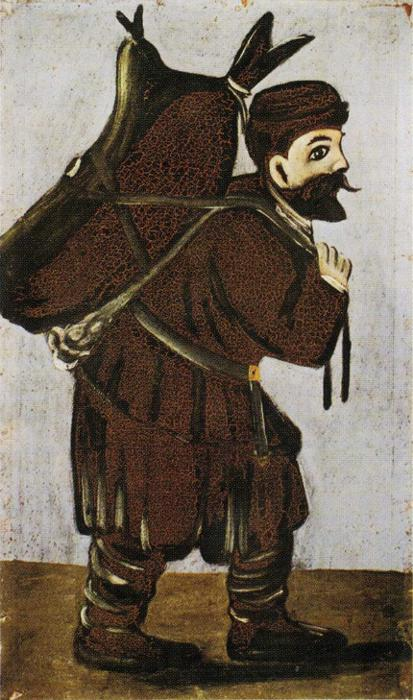
Porter with a Wineskin, by Niko Pirosmani (before 1919)

New Wine into Old Wineskins (οἶνον νέον εἰς ἀσκοὺς παλαιούς, lit. 'New Wine into Old Bags'), also New Wine into Old Bottles (KJV), is a parable of Jesus. It is found at Matthew 9 (Matthew 9:14–17), Mark 2 (Mark 2:18–22), and Luke 5 (Luke 5:33–39).

== Passage ==
The parables follow the recruitment of Levi as a disciple of Jesus, and appear to be part of a discussion at a banquet held by him (Luke 5:29). The parables are told in response to a question about fasting:

Then they said to him, “John’s disciples, like the disciples of the Pharisees, frequently fast and pray, but your disciples eat and drink.” Jesus said to them, “You cannot make wedding guests fast while the bridegroom is with them, can you? The days will come when the bridegroom will be taken away from them, and then they will fast in those days.”

— Luke 5:33–35, NRSV

Jesus' response continues with the two short parables. Luke has the more detailed version:

He also told them a parable: “No one tears a piece from a new garment and sews it on an old garment; otherwise the new will be torn, and the piece from the new will not match the old. And no one puts new wine into old wineskins; otherwise the new wine will burst the skins and will be spilled, and the skins will be destroyed. But new wine must be put into fresh wineskins. And no one after drinking old wine desires new wine, but says, ‘The old is good.’”

— Luke 5:36–39, NRSV]

== Interpretation ==
The two parables relate to the relationship between Jesus' teaching and traditional Judaism. According to some interpreters, Jesus here "pits his own, new way against the old way of the Pharisees and their scribes." In the early second century, Marcion, founder of Marcionism, used the passage to justify a "total separation between the religion that Jesus and Paul espoused and that of the Hebrew Scriptures." (Note: Other interpreters of the Torah-observing community would state that this new skin represents a new body, since the believer dies to the old self, and that the new wine symbolises a new spirit, which is the spirit of God within the believer. The new wine could also be seen as referring to baptism and the receiving of the Holy Spirit person with a new spirit to lead a godly life following the Torah in love.)

Other interpreters see Luke as giving Christianity roots in Jewish antiquity, although "Jesus has brought something new, and the rituals and traditions of official Judaism cannot contain it."

In his commentary on Matthew, Mark, and Luke, John Calvin says this is part of the larger answer Christ is making to the Pharisees about the fact his disciples did not fast twice a week as they did, and as the disciples of John the Baptist did (Calvin also points out that the Pharisees were using it as a way to create a division between Jesus and John). In the first part of the answer, he illustrates through a marriage situation: it would be ridiculous to fast during the event which used to last a week in their culture, especially when you are with the groom. Christ (which means "messiah") is the groom, so there is no point for them to fast, only to rejoice. Calvin then states that both distinctions (old and new wine and wineskins as well as the old and new garment) are the mentality and oral tradition left by the Pharisees which is not in accord with the proper teachings of the law, as Jesus was preaching. So those who follow Jesus should abandon their old (and bad) views on how they must obey the law, and not the oral tradition with what Jesus was preaching. But especially the Pharisees had a taste for it, and it blocked their minds to recognize what Jesus was teaching them.

Based on parallel rabbinic sayings found in Pirkei Avot, one interpreter sees the parable as depicting the difficulty of teaching disciples with prior learning as compared to teaching new, uneducated disciples.

The metaphors in the two parables were drawn from contemporary culture. New cloth had not yet shrunk, so that using new cloth to patch older clothing would result in a tear as it began to shrink. Similarly, old wineskins had been "stretched to the limit" or become brittle as wine had fermented inside them; using them again therefore risked bursting them.

Cornelius a Lapide in his The Great Commentary of Cornelius a Lapide gives the traditional interpretation of this parable, writing that: "Christ shows by a threefold similitude, that His disciples must not fast when He was present. 1. By the parable of the Spouse and the wedding. 2. Of the old and new garment. 3. Of the new wine, and the old bottles of skin. The sense is this: 'As new wine, or must, by the violence of its fermenting spirit, and its heat, bursts the old skins, because they are worn and weak, and so there is a double loss, both of wine and skins; therefore new wine must be poured into new skins, that, being strong, they may be able to bear the force of the must: so in like manner, new austerities and fasts must not be imposed as yet upon My disciples, lest their spirits should be broken, and they depart from Me. But I wait for the coming of the Holy Ghost at Pentecost.'"

== See also ==
- Abrogation of Old Covenant laws
- Biblical law in Christianity
- Covenant (biblical)
- New Commandment
- New Covenant
- Split of early Christianity and Judaism
- Supersessionism

== Explanatory notes ==
New Wine into Old Wineskins Life of Jesus: Ministry Events
Preceded by Calling of Matthew	New Testament; Events	Succeeded by Commissioning of the Twelve Apostles
