= Paintings in the Contarelli Chapel =

Group of paintings by Caravaggio

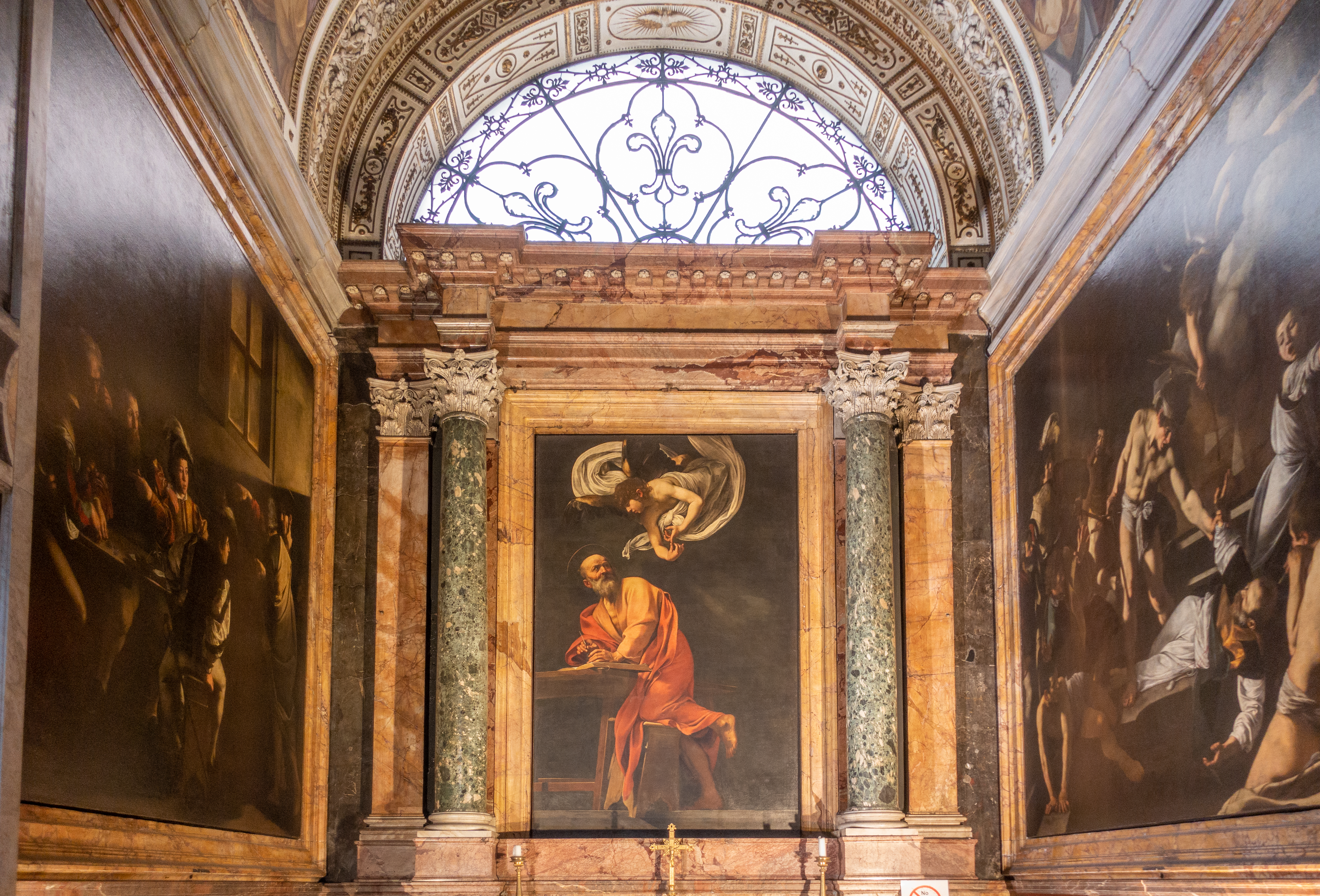
- Artist: Caravaggio
- Movement: Baroque painting
- Location: San Luigi dei Francesi, Rome

The paintings in the Contarelli Chapel form a group of three large-format canvases painted by Caravaggio between 1599 and 1602, initially commissioned by Cardinal Matteo Contarelli for the church of San Luigi dei Francesi in Rome, and eventually honored after his death by his executors. The intervention of Cardinal Del Monte, Caravaggio's patron, was decisive in obtaining this contract, which was the most significant of the painter's young career when he was not yet 30. The works evoke three major stages in the life of Saint Matthew: his calling by Christ (The Calling of Saint Matthew), his writing of his Gospel guided by an angel (The Inspiration of Saint Matthew), and his martyrdom (The Martyrdom of Saint Matthew). The paintings are still in situ at San Luigi dei Francesi.

Although Caravaggio worked particularly fast, the canvases were installed slowly and in stages: first, the two side canvases representing the Calling and the Martyrdom were hung in 1600, then it was decided to add an altarpiece with the angel to replace an unsatisfactory statue, but this painting had to be redone as its first version (Saint Matthew and the Angel) was rejected. In 1603, the ensemble was finally definitively installed; it met with great success, even if sometimes virulent criticism was voiced against its innovative aspects, in particular the naturalism of its painting and certain theological choices.

This was Caravaggio's first public commission, and it caused his reputation to grow considerably. It led to Caravaggio's work becoming well-known in Roman artistic circles and among the general public.

== Context ==
=== Art and religion in Rome ===
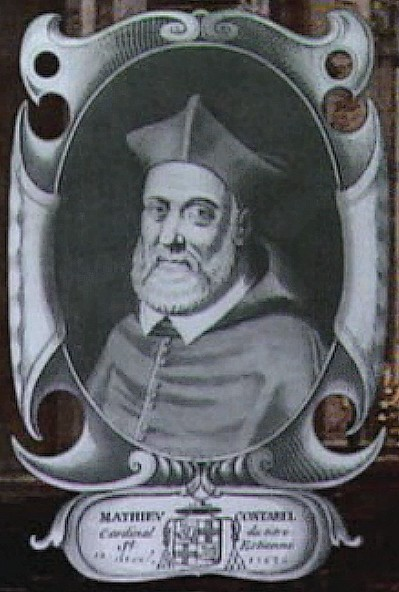
Cardinal Contarelli had his private chapel decorated in the church of San Luigi dei Francesi.

The church of San Luigi dei Francesi ('St. Louis of the French') in Rome, between the Pantheon and Piazza Navona, was built in 1518 as a French property for French pilgrims to the papal city. The 70 years of its construction were marked by various episodes in the Wars of Religion that were then tearing Europe apart (including the St. Bartholomew's Day massacre in 1572). During this time the Papacy made a deliberate choice of Catholic religious propaganda: the conclusions of the Council of Trent, which ended in 1563, notably emphasized the crucial role of images in propagating the faith.

The reigns of Popes Sixtus V and Clement VIII (whose reign coincided with Caravaggio's stay in Rome: 1592–1605) were marked by lively artistic activity, in a context of a return to the Christian roots of pictorial art. The Accademia di San Luca was revived in 1593, under the direction of Federico Zuccari. Cardinal Federico Borromeo, an influential prelate, was initially its patron but became Archbishop of Milan in 1596; he was succeeded by Cardinal Francesco Maria del Monte and the elderly Cardinal Gabriele Paleotti, a veteran of the Council of Trent and author of a treatise on art. This was a favorable period for official commissions, with a certain openness on the part of the clergy to new artistic forms: the successes of Jan Brueghel the Elder, Federico Barocci and Annibale Carracci testify to a marked tendency towards Art du vrai, in particular in opposition to a certain form of Mannerism.

Rome was the home of the French prelate Matthieu Cointrel, whose name was commonly Italianized as Matteo Contarelli, as was customary at the time, and who attained the rank of cardinal in December 1583. Contarelli was a close associate of Pope Gregory XIII, who reigned from 1572 to 1585. Having made a substantial contribution to the financing of San Luigi dei Francesi (in particular for the work on the façade), Contarelli designated a chapel for his burial, the first chapel to the left of the main altar, which he had acquired in 1565.

=== Caravaggio's ascent ===
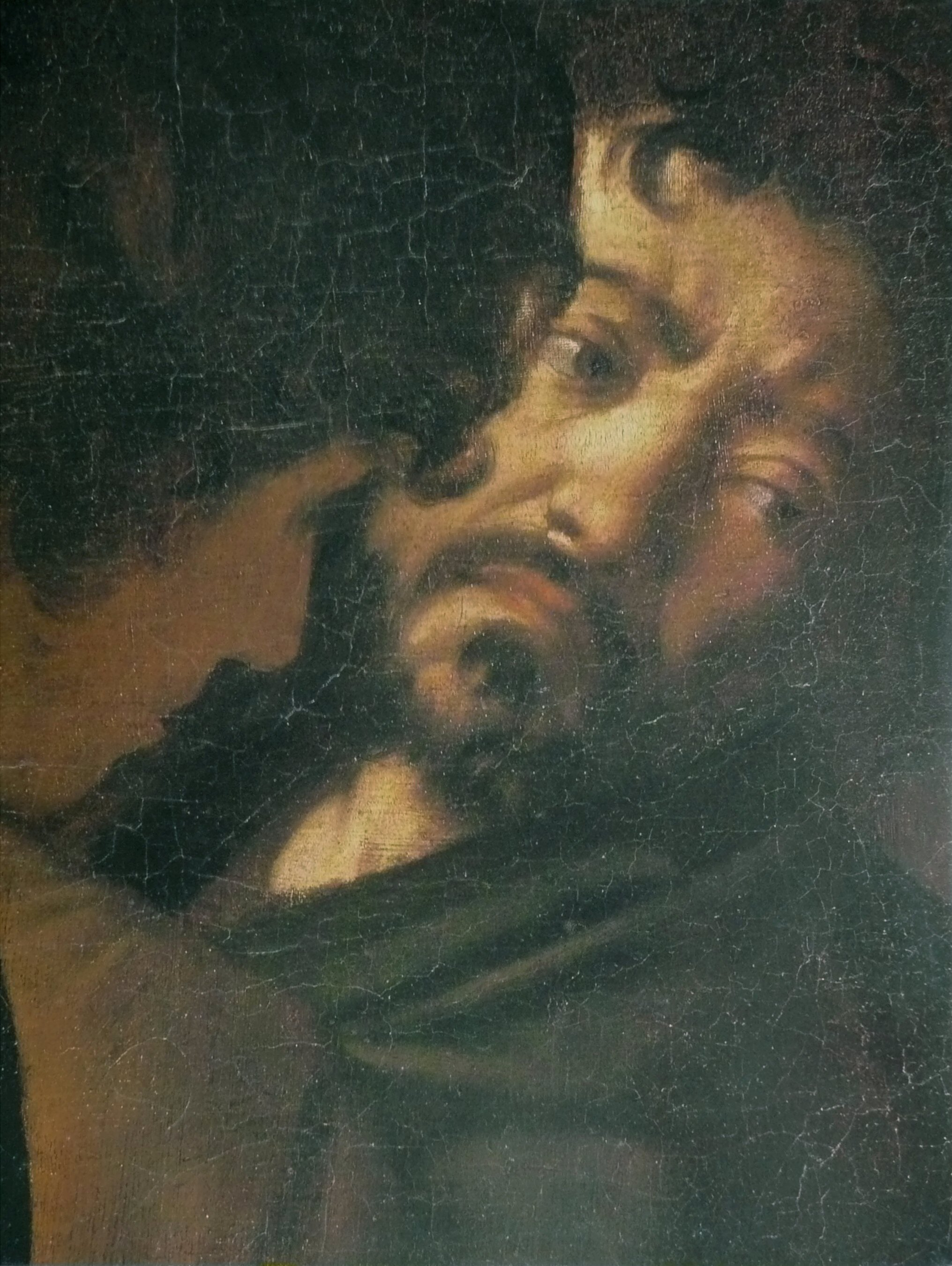
Self-portrait by Caravaggio (detail from The Martyrdom of Saint Matthew).

After receiving his initial training in Milan, Caravaggio arrived in Rome in the early 1590s, perhaps in the summer of 1592, aged around twenty. He passed through several studios, working on a variety of small-scale productions, including flowers and fruit. In the late 1590s, Cardinal del Monte discovered his paintings and took him under his protection; he even installed him under his roof in the Palazzo Madama, his official residence since 1589, as representative of the Grand Duke of Tuscany, Ferdinand I de' Medici. The palazzo (today the seat of the Italian Senate) is located right next to San Luigi dei Francesi. It is likely, however, that Caravaggio's home was in the Palazzo Firenze, (Note: The Palazzo Firenze is a ten-minute walk away on the Via dei Prefetti.) which del Monte used in addition to the Palazzo Madama; this building has underground rooms with skylights that let in daylight, which would be just what Caravaggio needed for the series of paintings in the Contarelli Chapel.

Despite the success he was beginning to enjoy among art lovers, as evidenced by the cardinal's patronage, Caravaggio had not yet received any official commissions and had not produced any works with a religious theme; the Saint Matthew series was a novelty for him. The paintings in the Contarelli Chapel were his first public commission. (Note: The terms "official commission" and "public commission" tend to be intertwined in the Roman context: the commissioners, as in the case of Cardinal Contarelli, were both men of the Church and close to the state apparatus. Gérard-Julien Salvy more accurately refers to Caravaggio's great Roman creations as "works for the public", destined to be exhibited in chapels of churches, and thus to the public (see Salvy 2008, p. 132), even if it was indeed private commissioners ("always a private person, as their chapels were private" Salvy 2008, p. 143) who carried out these commissions, or their executors in Contarelli's case. Art historians tend to speak of "private commissions" when paintings are commissioned for personal collections and are not intended for public display. This is particularly true of the paintings that precede the Saint Matthew cycle, acquired by the papal camerlengo Vittrici or Cardinal del Monte, who kept them in their homes. The canvases exhibited in the Contarelli Chapel thus represent Caravaggio's very first public commission, and this new exhibition opens the door to his fame.) His success was so intense and immediate that, even before completing this commission, he received another, equally prestigious one from Tiberio Cerasi for the church of Santa Maria del Popolo. (Note: These are The Conversion of Saint Paul and The Crucifxion of Saint Peter.)

== Public orders ==
=== Hesitation and delay ===
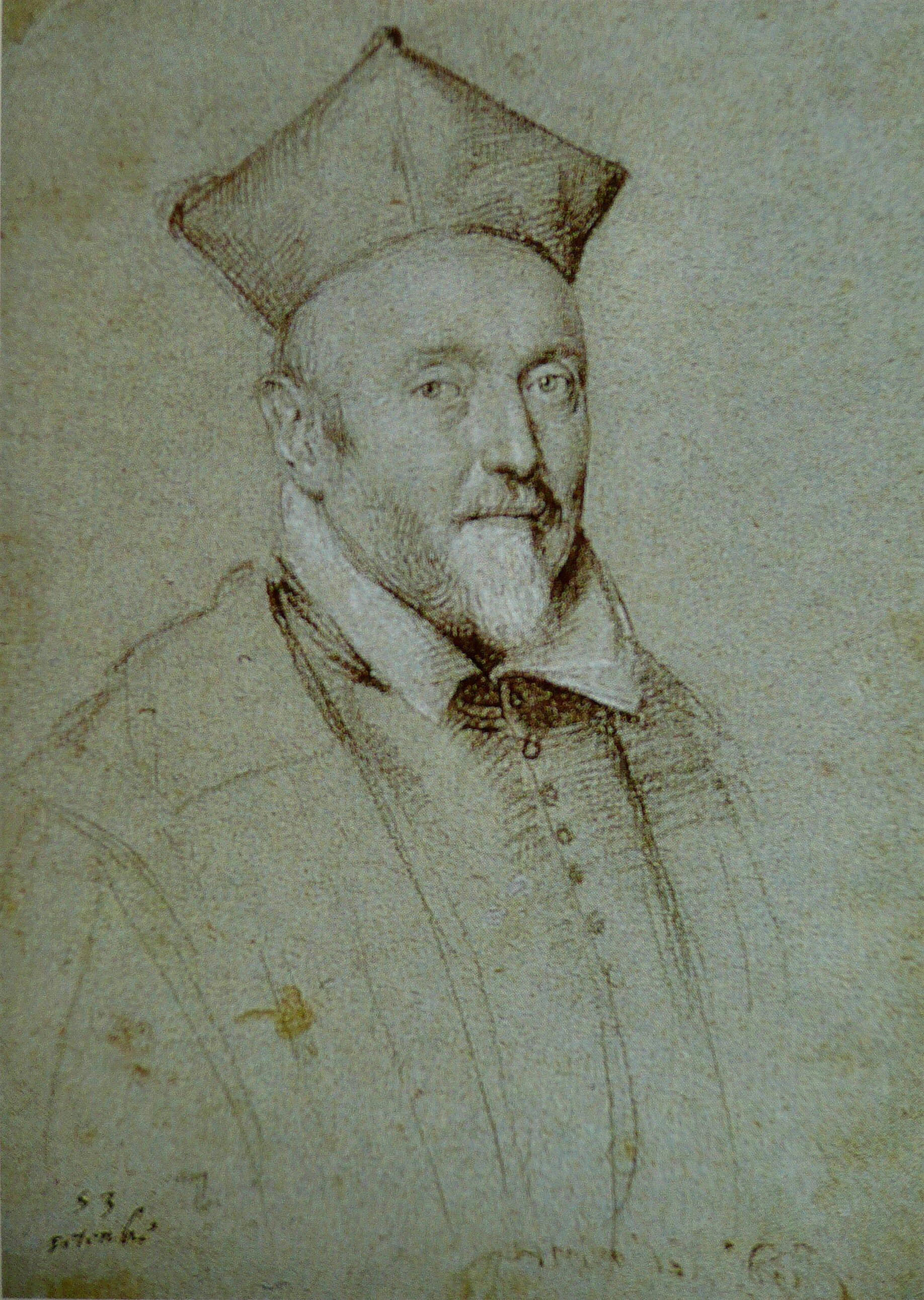
Cardinal Del Monte, Caravaggio's patron and protector, enabled him to win the contract for the Contarelli Chapel. Chalk portrait of 1616 by Ottavio Leoni in the Ringling Museum, Sarasota, Florida.

Shortly before he died in 1585, Contarelli chose the painter Girolamo Muziano to paint six scenes from the life of Saint Matthew on the altarpiece, walls, and vault, but Muziano in turn died in 1592 without even having begun the work. The cardinal's heirs, Monsignor Melchior Crescenzi and his nephew Virgilio, were therefore responsible for continuing the work: they chose to commission Giuseppe Cesari, alias the Cavalier d'Arpino. Cesari did indeed paint the fresco on the vault in 1593, (Note: It was during this period that Caravaggio was employed in the Cavalier d'Arpino's studio, a few years before being invited to Cardinal del Monte's home. Salvy 2008, p. 133.) as well as two others depicting The Miracle of Saint Matthew and two groups of two prophets, but ultimately failed to supply any of the canvases also requested. He did, however, make a preparatory drawing for The Calling of Saint Matthew, but went no further. In addition, a statue was commissioned in 1587 from the sculptor Jacob Cobaert to be placed above the altar but was not completed and installed until 1602.

The choice of commissioning canvases rather than decorative frescoes to decorate a Roman chapel was an innovation specific to the decade 1590–1600. There are only a few earlier examples in Rome: Muziano's paintings for Santa Maria in Ara Coeli, for example, were produced between 1586 and 1589, and also depict scenes from the life of Saint Matthew. But this trend, new at the time, was destined to last.

Virgilio Crescenzi died in 1592, and his executor was Cardinal del Monte, a member of the Fabbrica di San Pietro, which directed and organized the work of the clergy in the Vatican. It is therefore likely that, as Caravaggio's first biographer Giovanni Baglione writes, Del Monte convinced Melchior Crescenzi (Note: It was all the more necessary for the Apostolic Chamber to take control of the project, as the Crescenzi family were beginning to be accused of deliberately wasting time to enrich themselves from the sums earmarked for the work. Cappelletti 2008, p. 44) and François Cointrel (nephew of the late cardinal) to ask Caravaggio to decorate the side walls of the chapels. According to the seventeenth-century biographer Gian Pietro Bellori, Caravaggio even belonged to Monsignor Crescenzi's household on the recommendation of Giambattista Marino (which is not attested elsewhere) and produced portraits of the two patrons (which have now disappeared). In this way, Del Monte was able both to boost his protégé's career and show his interest in France.

=== Side panels ===
Caravaggio was finally commissioned in 1599 when the church administrators decided to reopen the Contarelli Chapel to worship. A contract dated 23 July 1599, provided for the payment of 400 ecus (Note: This was the sum that the Cavalier d'Arpino was to receive for the paintings he had originally been commissioned to paint. Salvy 2008, p. 134.) for the two side canvases, which were inaugurated barely a year later, in July of the Holy Year 1600: the Calling and the Martyrdom of Saint Matthew, which were placed on either side of the altar. The completion of these two canvases was therefore particularly rapid.

=== Altarpiece ===
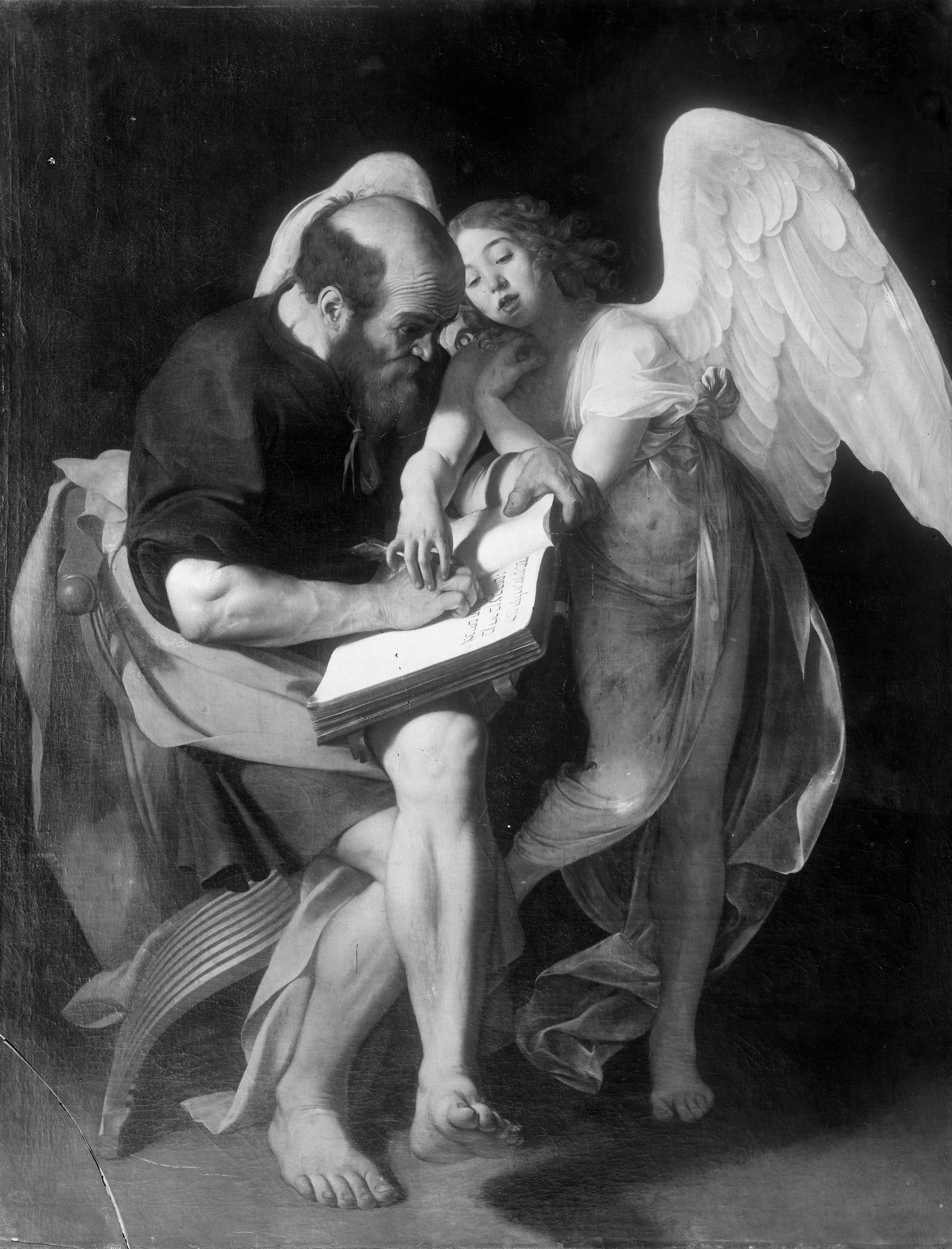
The first version of Saint Matthew and the Angel, probably rejected by the commissioners. The painting was destroyed in Berlin during the bombing raids of 1945, leaving only this black-and-white photograph.

Cobaert's statue, barely installed on the altar in 1602, was finally rejected by the Congregation of St. Louis; it was completed by another sculptor, Pompeo Ferrucci (the angel was missing), and then installed in another Roman church, the Santissima Trinità dei Pellegrini. In 1602, Caravaggio was commissioned to replace Cobaert's statue (Note: Ordered on 7 February 1602 by Abbé Giacomo Crescenzi, for 150 Ecus. Salvy 2008, p. 134.) with an altarpiece depicting Saint Matthew and the Angel. This canvas was installed on 26 May of the same year, the day of Pentecost, but was again rejected by the commissioners; Caravaggio immediately proposed another version, The Inspiration of Saint Matthew, which was accepted and installed in February 1603, in the center of the chapel lined with multicolored marble.

This proposal for an almost immediate second version of Saint Matthew and the Angel is currently being put forward based on concordant documentary sources, and undermines Roberto Longhi's assertions on this subject in his seminal texts of the 1920s. For him, this crude, uncultivated Matthew was produced around 1592, eight years before Caravaggio reached "maturity" in 1600.

=== Reception ===
Despite Caravaggio's speed (including a second, radically different version of his Saint Matthew and the Angel, two years elapsed between the installation of the two side canvases (1600) and the altar (1602), echoing the long delays in completing the building work. Tired of waiting for some thirty years, the church's priests harbored a certain resentment towards the Crescenzi family. In this tense context, it is possible that Caravaggio's radical choices for the last painting were very poorly received and led to a swift rejection. This is what his biographer Bellori tells us:

"(...) when he had finished the central painting of the Story of Matthew, and placed it on the altar, the priests had it removed on the pretext that the figure had neither the nobility nor the appearance of a saint, sitting as it was, legs crossed, rudely showing its feet to the people. Caravaggio despaired at such an insult to the first work he had done for a church (...)".

— Giovan Bellori, Life of Caravaggio, 1672.

Baglione, a great adversary of Caravaggio, could not avoid testifying to the success of the works exhibited, but asserted that those who praised the paintings were "malicious people"; he adds a note of perfidy by claiming that this success was only due to the proximity of the works of the Cavalier d'Arpino (on the vault, described as "very well painted"), and even accuses Caravaggio of swindling Vincenzo Giustiniani by selling him the first Saint Matthew and the Angel, the one "nobody had liked". He also reports the words of the influential Federico Zuccari, who came to see the canvases and, "laughing under his breath and marvelling at so much fuss", declared that he could see in them nothing other than the thoughts of Giorgione, a painter who was certainly more than evident, but who had already disappeared almost a century earlier (in 1510): "Io non ci vedo altro che il pensiero di Giorgione." The acid remarks of Caravaggio's arch-rival Baglione do not correspond to historical reality, which shows, on the contrary, that Caravaggio's success was considerable, and provided him with the opportunity of new commissions. Among his contemporary admirers, Peter Paul Rubens closely observed Caravaggio's works in this chapel (and, even more so, those in the Cerasi Chapel) and probably used one of the figures from the Calling (the seated young man seen from behind) in various drawings.

Gérard-Julien Salvy points out that the naturalism of the paintings in the Contarelli Chapel was bound to "scandalize" the Roman academic school of the time. He cites the critic Zolotov who, in a 1979 article, sees in Zuccari an echo of the tension between the Roman school and the Lombardo-Venetian innovations carried by Caravaggio in his insistence "on nature, on the picturesque element of nature", but for Salvy, contemporary admirers of Caravaggio's work must have been touched above all by the contemplative aspect and "deep contemplation of the figures" from which emerges "a dramatic feeling expressed in a way other than through the forms of Roman rhetorical invention".

From a theological point of view, the rejection of the Saint Matthew and the Angel as barefoot, dirty, and with coarse features can be explained by the apparent vulgarity of the character, but the very faithful depiction of the same Matthew as a tax collector in the Calling is potentially just as shocking since this literal accuracy is not in keeping with the spirit of the proponents of Roman academism either; Salvy speaks of a "provocative and revolutionary orthodoxy".

=== Alternative hypothesis ===
Although the replacement of the first Saint Matthew and the Angel by a second version is attested, doubts remain as to whether the first painting was rejected. For the Caravaggio specialist Sybille Ebert-Schifferer this does not sit well with the high esteem in which the painter was held at the time. According to her, the first painting was installed as early as 1599, but temporarily, pending the installation of the group sculpted by Cobaert (and thus before the two side paintings were completed). It was very well received, and Giustiniani acquired it at that time. The side paintings were then installed as planned, and Cobaert's statue arrived but was rejected: Caravaggio was then called in to propose a second Inspiration of Saint Matthew, just as well received as the previous one. There is thus a historical confusion between the rejection of Cobaert's statue and that of Caravaggio's painting, a confusion perhaps intended by the antagonistic Baglione. The critic Alfred Moir also finds this rejection implausible, and believes that "this alleged refusal (...) hardly seems defensible."

However, this is only a research hypothesis, and is not widely accepted. (Note: Other specialists such as Salvy, Puglisi, Cappelletti, and Gregori (see bibliography) limit themselves to mentioning the first painting, which was rejected and then quickly replaced by the second.)

== Paintings ==
The paintings are presented here from left to right, according to their arrangement around the altar. This organization also follows the chronology of the story of Saint Matthew, who is first called by Christ, then writes his Gospel, and finally dies a martyr.

In the Calling on the left-hand wall, Christ appears alongside Saint Peter on the right-hand side of the painting; he points to Matthew, then a tax official, who is sitting with various companions at a table where money is being counted, so that he will follow him and become one of his apostles. The central painting shows the same Matthew, older, writing his Gospel; his writing hand is directed by an angel flying overhead, seemingly explaining or dictating its content. Finally, the painting on the right-hand wall depicts Matthew's death, assassinated in his church during a religious service and amid a motley crowd; an angel is also present, handing him the martyr's palm.

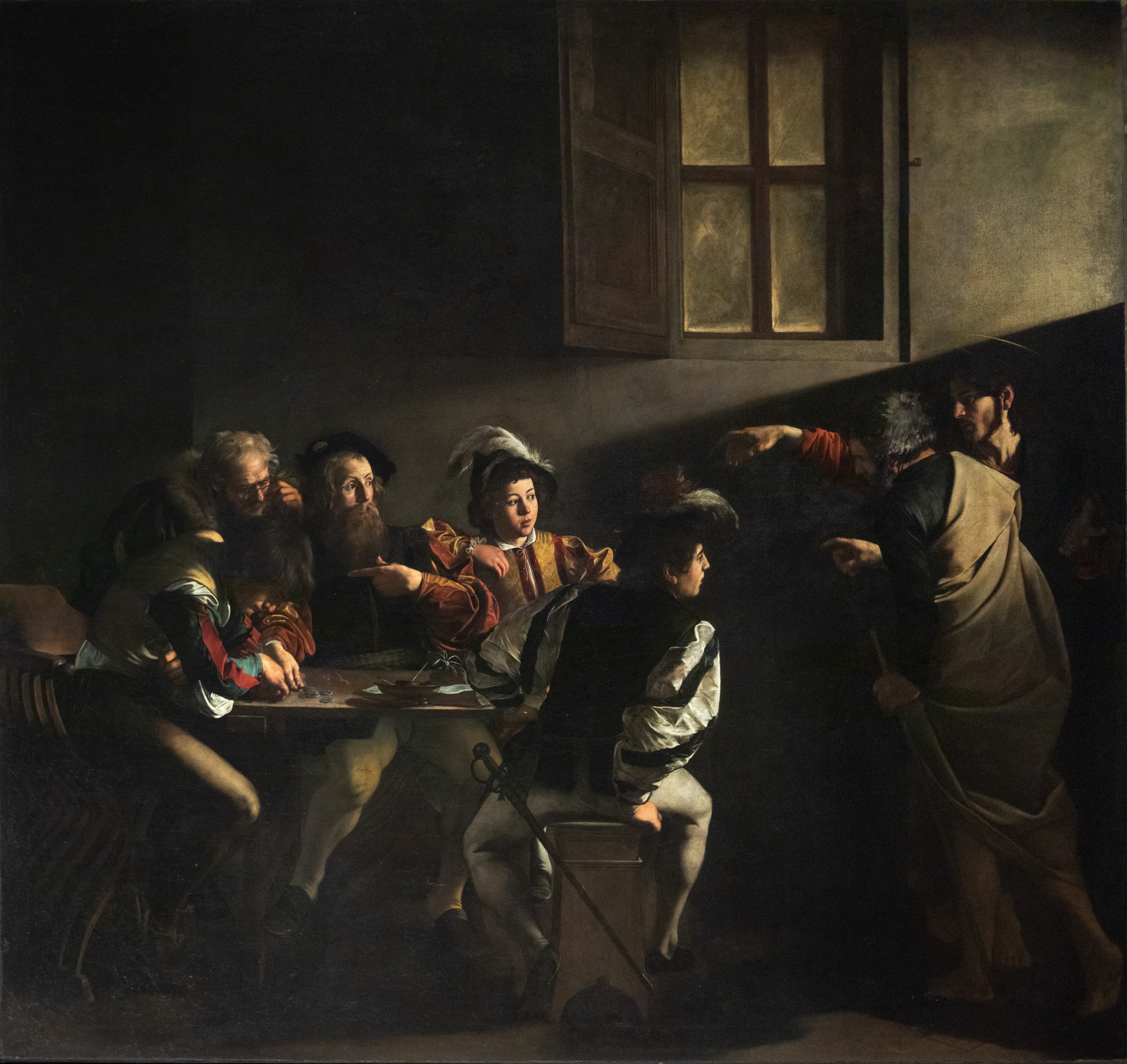
The Calling of Saint Matthew

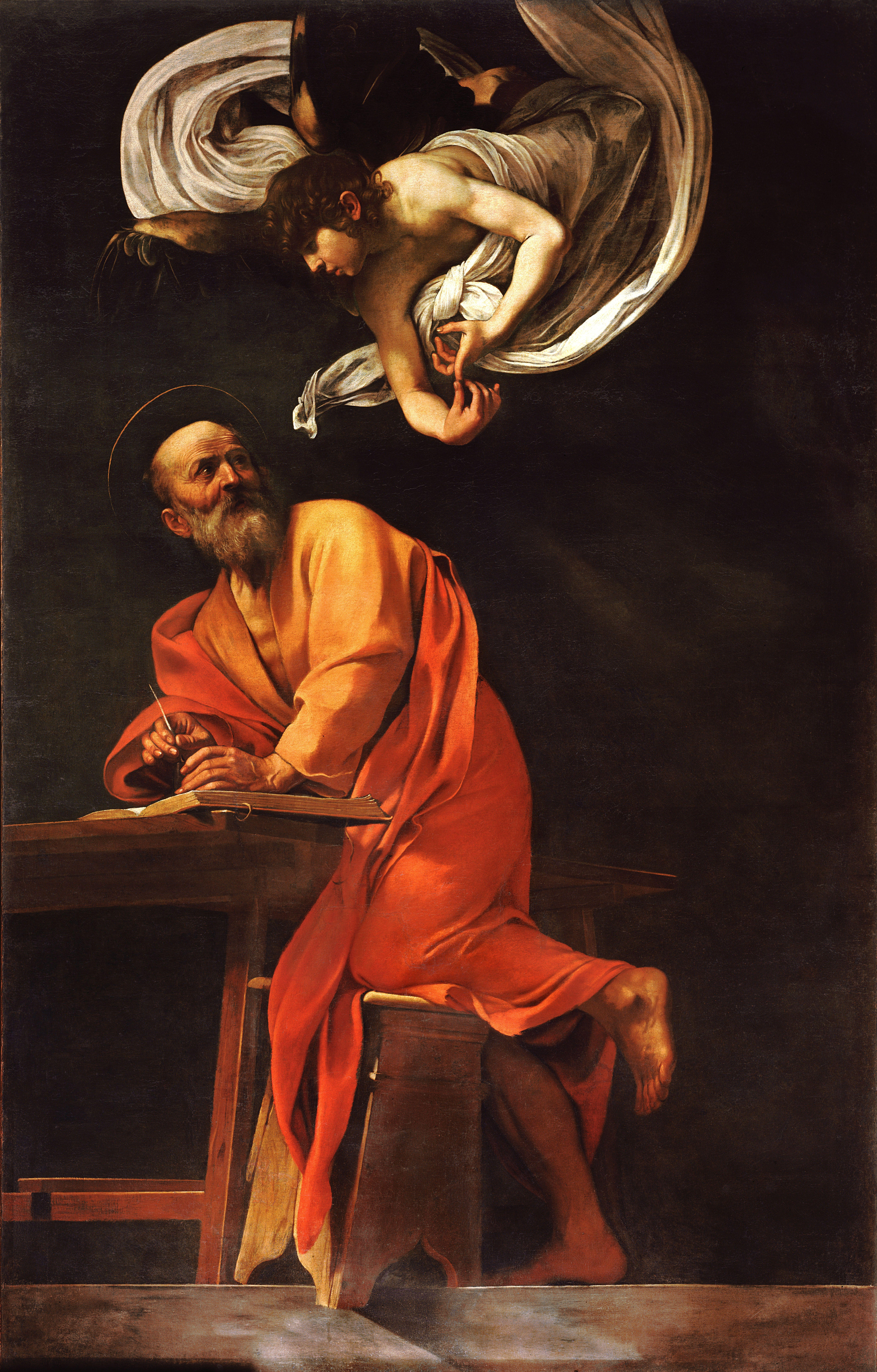
The Inspiration of Saint Matthew

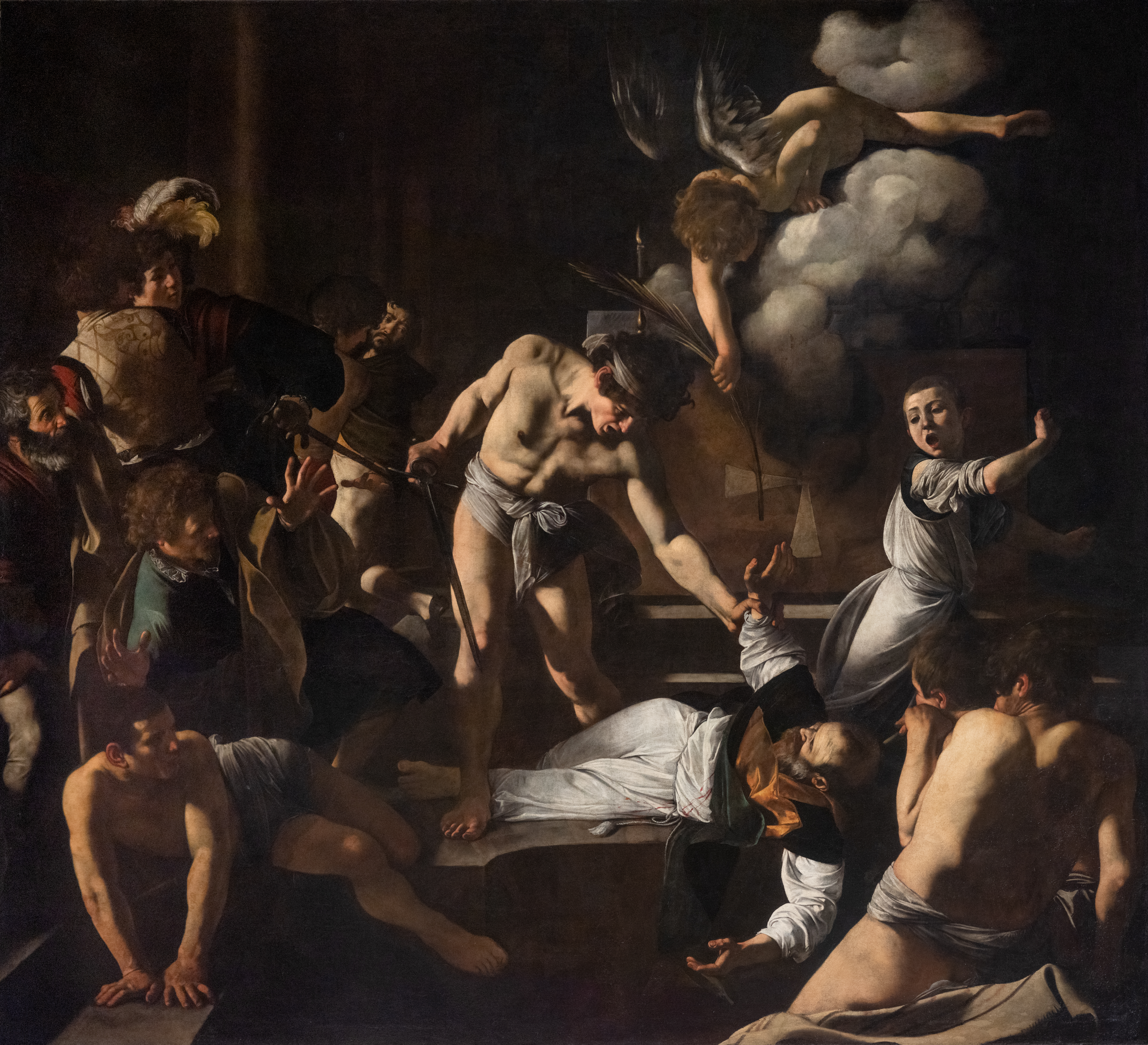
The Martyrdom of Saint Matthew

=== Saint Matthew ===
The original commissioner of the paintings, Cardinal Matteo Contarelli, bore the same name as the apostle Matthew; this was no coincidence, since the chapel was intended to house the cardinal's tomb, and thus to honor his memory. Matthew's story also appealed to the prelate, who wanted to associate his image with it: a publican by profession, and therefore in charge of tax collection in the Roman administration, he came from a high social class and, of all Christ's apostles, was the one who best-represented culture. As an evangelist, Matthew occupies a primordial place: the Catholic Church has given him first place in its liturgy. His hypothetical historical anteriority in the writing of the Gospels, however, has been hotly contested since the Griesbach hypothesis.

The apostle Matthew appears under this name only in the Gospel of Matthew; he is shown seated at "a toll booth" where Jesus comes to fetch him; (Note: The same gospel refers to Matthew as a "publican" in the list of the Twelve (Matthew 10:2).) the Gospel of Mark repeats the scene identically, but calls the character "Levi" (as does the Gospel of Luke) and specifies that he is "the son of Alphaeus". This profession of tax collector was highly unpopular with the Jews, due to its proximity to the Roman power in whose name it was exercised. In each version of this story, Matthew/Levi immediately follows Christ, who calls him; Luke even specifies that he follows him "leaving everything". A meal is then organized by Matthew, bringing together "publicans and sinners", and Christ, who is reproached for this, explains that he has not come to call the righteous, but sinners. This episode, in which Christ calls Matthew, fits in well with the scene depicted in Caravaggio's Calling, even if many of its elements (setting, characters) are matters of interpretation or imagination.

On the other hand, the scene of the writing of the Gospel under the direction of an angel, followed by that of the martyrdom of Matthew, evangelizer of Ethiopia, are not found in any biblical text. However, Jacobus de Voragine's Golden Legend recounts that Matthew was murdered for having opposed the love of the Ethiopian king Hirtacus for Iphigenia, the daughter of his predecessor. (Note: In his Dictionnaire philosophique, Voltaire also refers to this question in his comments on the Encyclopédie, and cites various extra-biblical sources: "According to Rufinus, Socrates and Abdias, he preached and died in Ethiopia. Heracleon says he lived a long time and died a natural death: but Abdias says that Hirtacus king of Ethiopia, brother of Eglipus, wishing to marry his niece Iphigenia, and was unable to obtain Saint Matthew's permission, had his head cut off, and set fire to Iphigenia's house. He to whom we owe the most detailed Gospel we have, deserved a better historian than Abdias.")

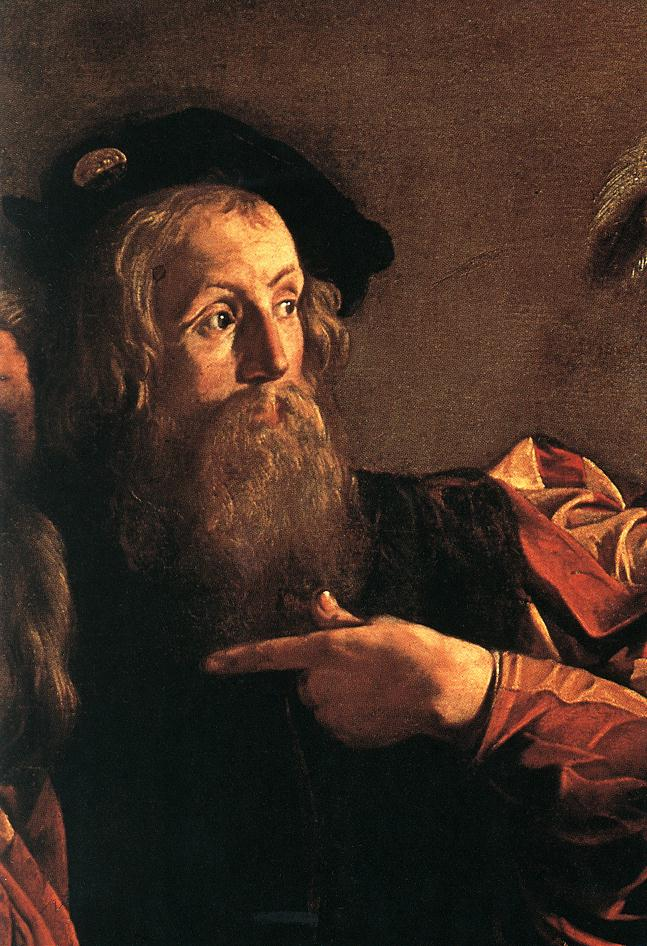
The publican Matthew (alias Levi) is called by Christ.

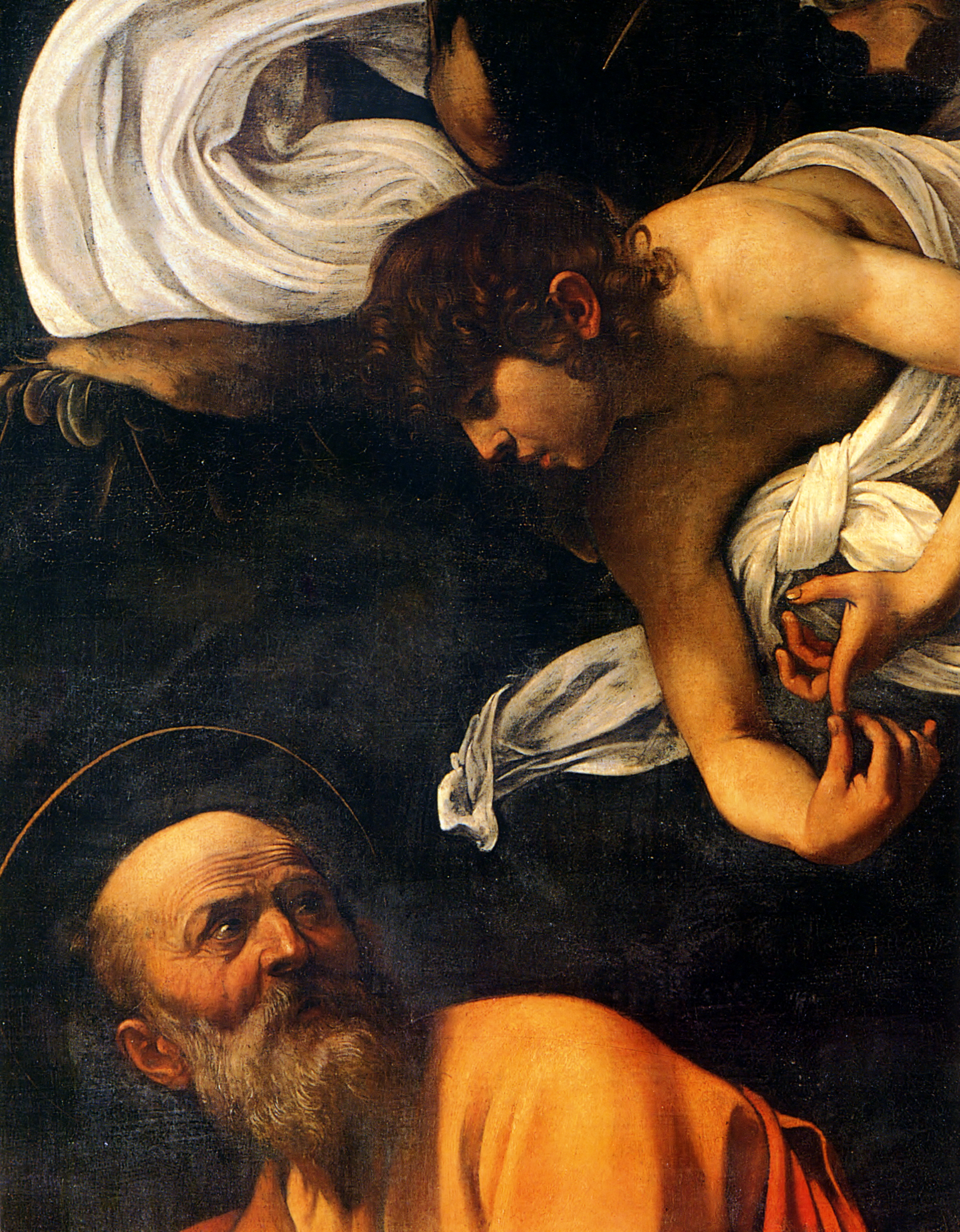
Matthew writes his Gospel, guided by an angel.

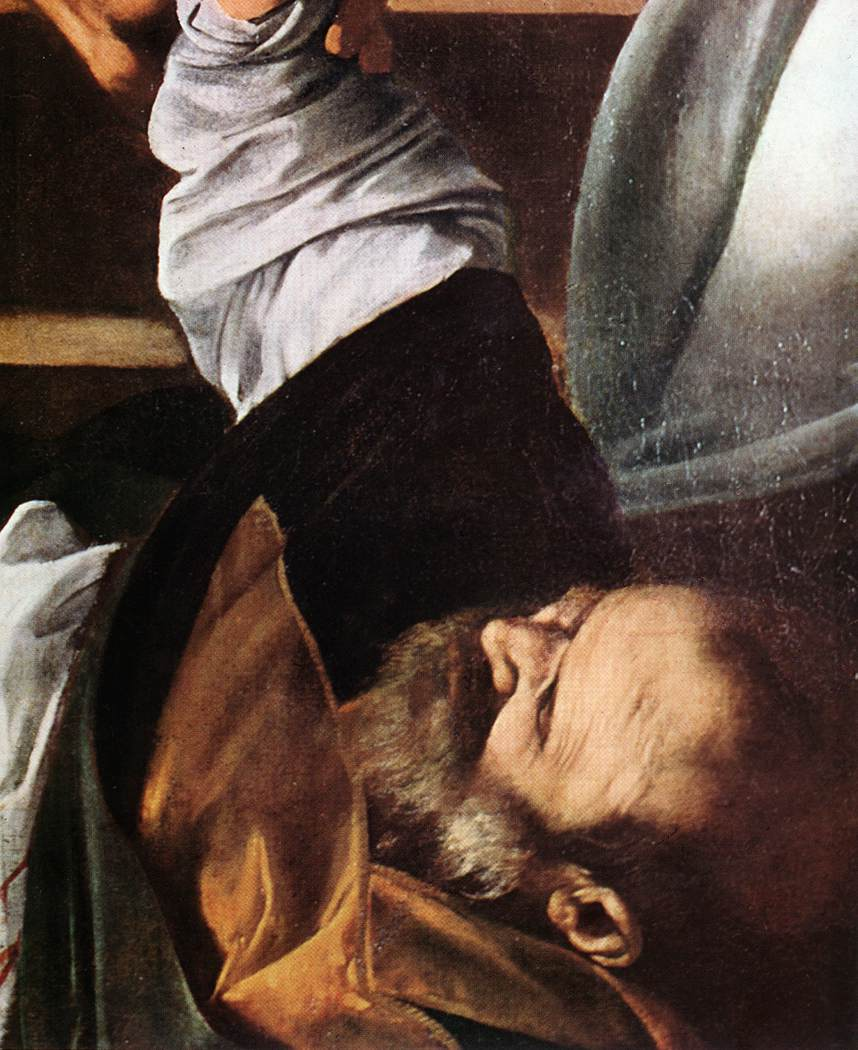
Death of the apostle Matthew in his church in Ethiopia.

=== Models and influences ===
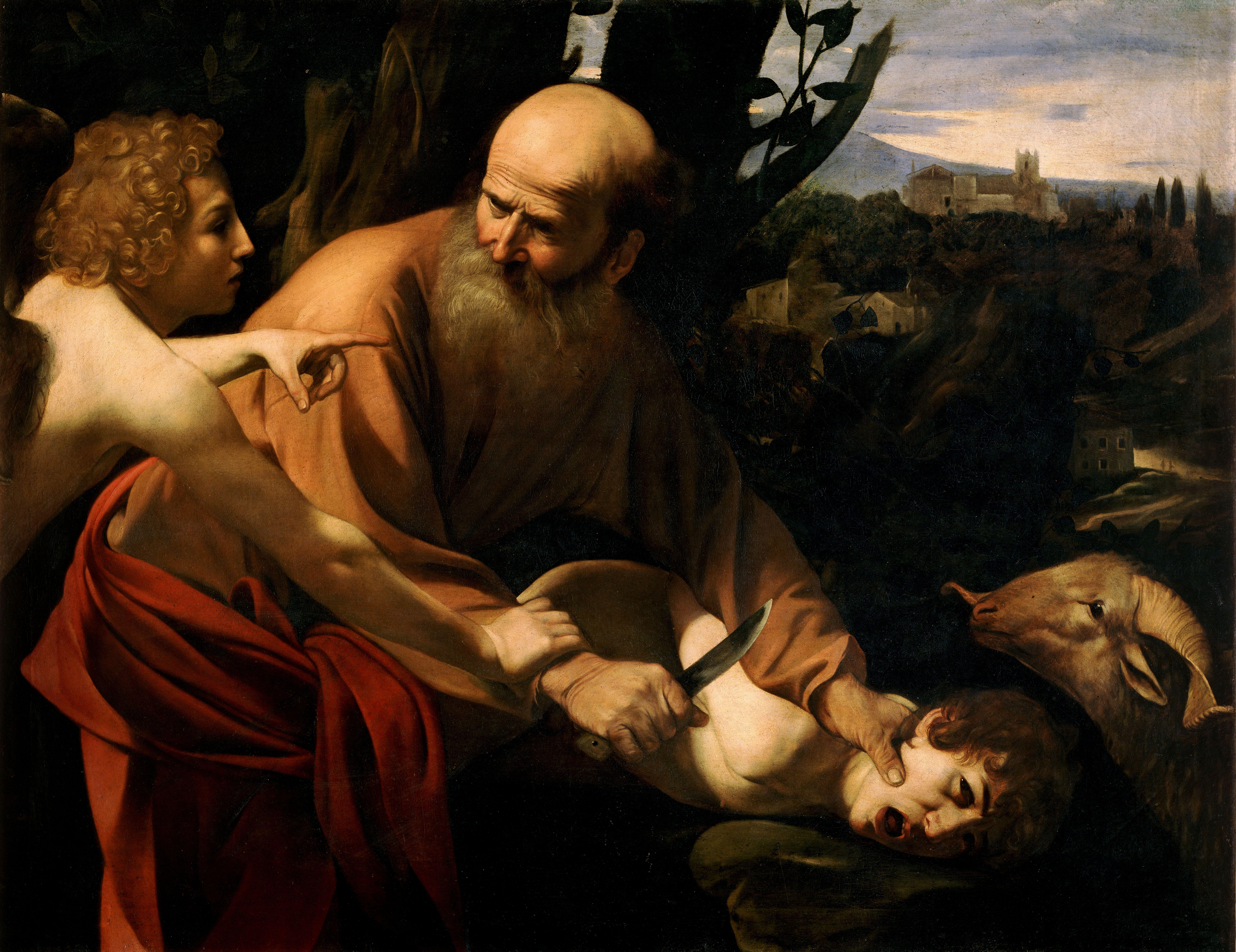
Caravaggio, The Sacrifice of Isaac, c. 1597–1598, Uffizi, Florence

The model for Matthew, who is logically depicted as getting older from one painting to the next, is probably the same one used in The Sacrifice of Isaac, and later in Saint Jerome in Meditation and The Incredulity of Saint Thomas. (Note: The Matthew with an angel of the first version, on the other hand, is much more reminiscent of classical busts of Socrates. Jaubert 1998.) It is also credible that the elegant young man seen from behind in the Calling is painted after the same model as the angel in the Sacrifice of Isaac. The angel visiting Matthew could have the same features as Isaac in the Sacrifice, or the young John the Baptist with the ram, or Cupid in Amor Vincit Omnia. Mario Minniti, a Sicilian painter and friend of Caravaggio's, would be represented in the young man with a feathered hat in the center of the Calling, as well as in the left margin of the Martyrdom, still wearing a feathered hat, as perhaps in one of the two versions of The Fortune Teller and The Lute Player.

Other figures are more anonymous, but no less identifiable with known sources. The executioner and the nudes in the Martyrdom, like the figures in Annibale Carracci's frescoes in the Palazzo Farnese, echoes the nudes on the Sistine Chapel ceiling; Christ's hand in the Calling even seems to be a direct quotation of Adam's in Michelangelo's Creation of Adam. There are also references to northern Italian painters, such as Titian, from whom Caravaggio takes a well-known figure for the acolyte on the right of the Martyrdom, or Savoldo, who accentuates the breadth of his figures' gestures; on the other hand, Caravaggio seems to distance himself from the influence of Raphael.

== Artistic choices ==
=== Composition ===
Caravaggio's commission was new for him in more ways than one: apart from the fact that it was his first official commission with a religious theme, he also had to create large-format canvases, incorporating more figures than in his previous paintings. He therefore opted for a new solution, in the tradition of Leonardo da Vinci's chiaroscuro, "drowning" a large part of the painting's surface in dense shadow and brutally lighting his figures. For Mina Gregori, this choice of high-contrast lighting in the two side paintings represents a major transformation in his pictorial approach, compared with the transparency of his earlier works: it enables him to achieve a solid effect of relief and volume. Bellori had already spotted this intention in the 17th century when he noted that the effect of focusing the light made it possible to "draw more force from the vehemence of chiaroscuro".

The choice of lighting sources is directly linked to the installation of the paintings in the chapel: the Calling, on the left, receives light from above and to the right, while the Martyrdom, on the right, is lit from the opposite direction, and the central painting is lit from above. Everything is done to give the impression that it is the chapel's central window that illuminates the paintings in this way, even though it provides very little light and the chapel is particularly dark. Bellori also notes this constraint, adding criticism of the painter's choice of colors: "the darkness of the chapel and the color rob [the Calling and the Martyrdom] from view".

The composition of the works responds to the double constraint of integrating them into the space of the chapel while at the same time linking them together. The figures in the two side canvases are therefore all depicted on the same scale; furthermore, the two paintings share an identical horizon line, which passes through the eyes of Christ in the Calling and those of the executioner in the Martyrdom; the position of the paintings forces us to perceive these lines with a distortion that further accentuates their dramatic effect. The location of the chapel, at the end of the nave and to the left, means that on entering, the viewer first encounters the Martyrdom, whose depth and breadth are an extension of the space of the church, but as they enter the chapel, the delineated space of the painting of the Calling echoes the impression of constriction they may experience there. These elements of context were certainly carefully considered by Caravaggio, who had only to cross the street to get from his studio in Palazzo Madama to the paintings' ultimate location at San Luigi dei Francesi.

=== Redesigns ===
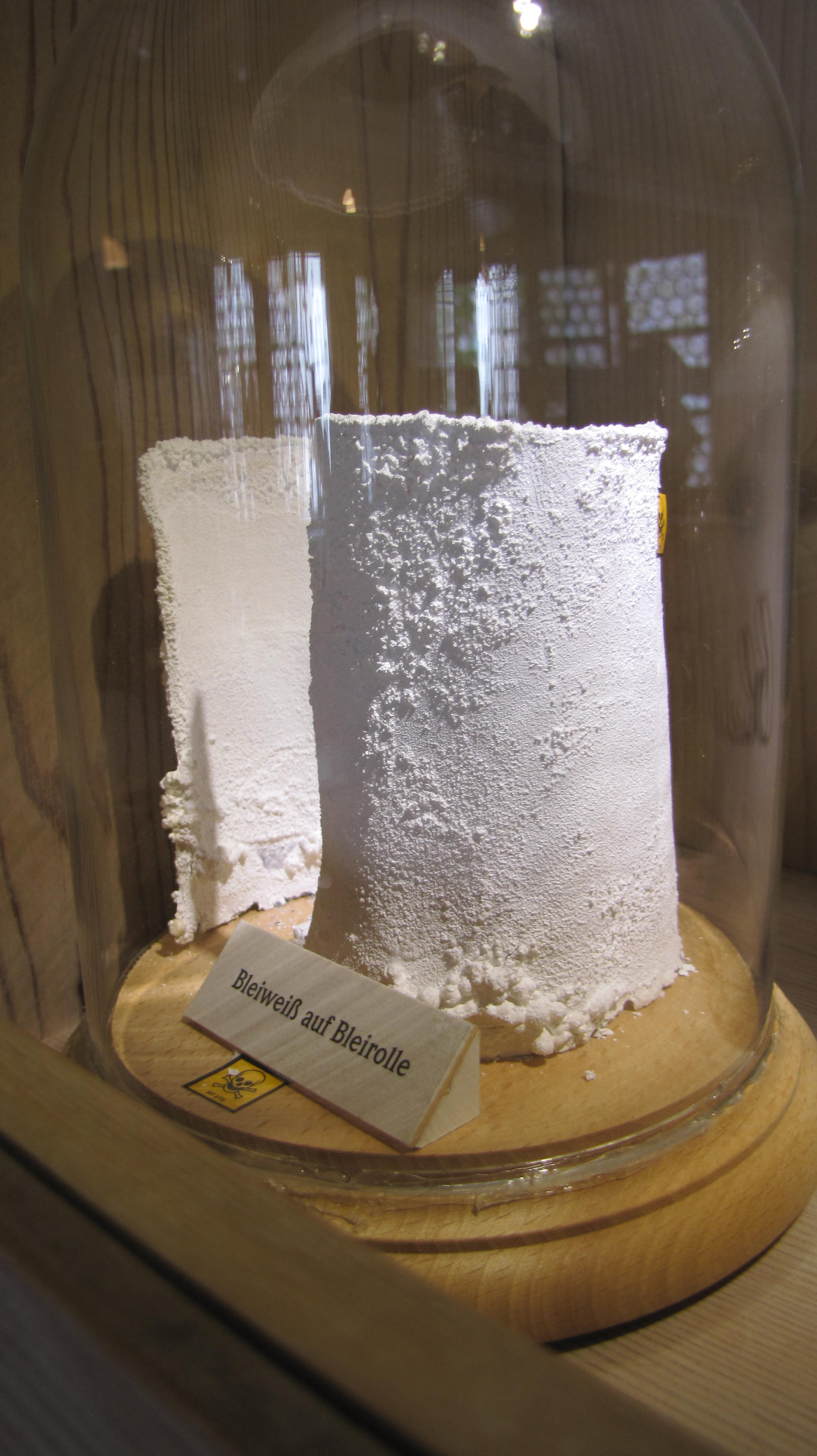
The lead white used by Caravaggio for his backgrounds and preparatory tracings makes it possible to trace certain stages of his initial project thanks to X-rays.

As there are no known preparatory drawings by Caravaggio's hand, only scientific analysis allows us to understand the stages and possible modifications during the execution of his paintings. No underlying drawings are detectable, but incisions are visible on the surface of the canvas, undoubtedly marked with the handle of the brush and providing reference points in the composition (for example, on the outline of the right calf of Matthew in The Inspiration of Saint Matthew).

However, an X-ray study carried out in 1952 by the art historian Lionello Venturi shows that beneath the painted surface of the Martyrdom lie several sketched figures that the painter ultimately chose to replace or modify and that these figures (more numerous than in the definitive version) are relatively small in size. (Note: Alfred Moir notes that the first sketch of the Martyrdom is reminiscent of a fresco of the Cavalier d'Arpino, "with small, mannered figures in theatrical poses (...)" By considerably reworking this composition, Caravaggio moved away from this influence to find more convincing solutions. Moir 1994, p. 20.) Caravaggio would have executed the Calling after this first version of the Martyrdom; then he would have taken over and corrected various elements of the Martyrdom to simplify its composition and to better match the size of his figures to those of the other painting. As for the Calling, X-rays reveal fewer modifications; the most evident, however, is that Christ was initially alone and that the apostle Peter only appeared alongside him at a later stage.

=== Pigments ===
Caravaggio's typical techniques and palette can already be seen in these works from his Roman period. The dark backgrounds are composed of lead white and lots of vegetable black, red ochre, and umber. The rest of the palette is fairly limited: yellow and red ochre, cinnabar, verdigris, and madder lacquer enable him to obtain some fifteen shades ranging from the warmest of the Calling to the coolest of the Martyrdom, thus meeting the dramatic needs of the painted scenes. It is possible that the choice of hues also depended on the tones of the surrounding colored marble.

== See also ==
- Caravaggio
- List of paintings by Caravaggio
- Caravaggisti

== Bibliography ==
- Jaubert, Alain (1998). Caravage: Anges et Bourreaux (Video). Palettes (in French).
- Calvesi, Maurizio; Volpi, Caterina (2002). Caravaggio nel IV centenario della Cappella Contarelli (in Italian). Rome: Petruzzi. ISBN 8890484233.
- Cappelletti, Francesca (2008). Le Caravage et les caravagesques. Les Grands Maîtres de l'Art. Paris: Le Figaro. ISBN 978-2-8105-0023-9.
- Ebert-Schifferer, Sybille (2009). Caravage. Paris: Hazan. ISBN 978-2-7541-0399-2.
- Gregori, Mina; Luigi Salerno, Luigi; Spear, Richard (1985). The Age of Caravaggio: an exhibition held at the Metropolitan Museum of Art, New York, February 5 – April 14, 1985, and at the Museo Nazionale di Capodimonte. New York, Milan: The Metropolitan Museum of Art and Electa. ISBN 0-87099-382-8.
- Hilaire, Michel (1995). Caravage, le sacré et la vie. Paris: Herscher. ISBN 2-7335-0251-4.
- Jadli, Anas (2025). Du reste à l'oeuvre. Reconsidération de la peinture religieuse de Caravage à partir des conditions d'éclairage, de visibilité et d'exposition (chapelle Contarelli, 1599-2025). HAL/EHESS (in French).
- Longhi, Roberto (2004). Le Caravage. Regard. ISBN 2-84105-169-2.
- Moir, Alfred (1994). Caravage. Points cardinaux. Paris: Cercle d'art. ISBN 2-7022-0376-0.
- Puglisi, Catherine (2005). Caravage. Paris: Phaidon. ISBN 978-0-7148-9995-4.
- Salvy, Gérard-Julien (2008). Le Caravage. Paris: Gallimard. ISBN 978-2-07-034131-3.
- Whitfield, Clovis (2011). Caravaggio's eye. Londres: Paul Holberton.
- Zuffi, Stefano (2012). Caravaggio: the stories of St. Matthew. Milan: ORE Cultura. ISBN 978-88-6648-085-3.
- Bellori, Giovan Pietro (1991). Vie du Caravage. Le Promeneur. Paris: Gallimard. ISBN 2-07-072391-7.
- Pariset, François-Georges (1952). "Le Caravage et Saint François". Annales. Histoire, Sciences Sociales. 7: 39–48. doi:10.3406/ahess.1952.2025.
- Ponnau, Dominique (2004). Caravage: l'esprit, la chair.
