= Matthew 9:35 =

- ← 9:34 9:36 →
- Book: Gospel of Matthew
- Christian Bible part: New Testament

Matthew 9:35 is a verse in the ninth chapter of the Gospel of Matthew in the New Testament.

== Content ==
In the original Greek according to Westcott-Hort for this verse is:

Καὶ περιῆγεν ὁ Ἰησοῦς τὰς πόλεις πάσας καὶ τὰς κώμας, διδάσκων ἐν ταῖς συναγωγαῖς αὐτῶν, καὶ κηρύσσων τὸ εὐαγγέλιον τῆς βασιλείας, καὶ θεραπεύων πᾶσαν νόσον καὶ πᾶσαν μαλακίαν ἐν τῷ λαῷ.

In the King James Version of the Bible the text reads:

And Jesus went about all the cities and villages, teaching in their synagogues, and preaching the gospel of the kingdom, and healing every sickness and every disease among the people.

The New International Version translates the passage as:

Jesus went through all the towns and villages, teaching in their synagogues, preaching the good news of the kingdom and healing every disease and sickness.

== Analysis ==
Both MacEvilly and Lapide state that the point of this verse is that Jesus taught both in the small humble towns and the larger cities, giving an example to preachers not just to be drawn to the large churches in important cities.

See also Matthew 9#Jesus' compassion.

== Commentary from the Church Fathers ==
Chrysostom: " The Lord would refute by actions the charge of the Pharisees, who said, He casteth out dæmons by the Prince of the dæmons; for a dæmon having suffered rebuke, does not return good but evil to those who have not shewn him honour. But the Lord on the other hand, when He has suffered blasphemy and contumely, not only does not punish, but does not utter a hard speech, yea He shews kindness to them that did it, as it here follows, And Jesus went about all their towns and villages. Herein He teaches us not to return accusations to them that accuse us, but kindness. For he that ceases to do good because of accusation, shews that his good has been done because of men. But if for God’s sake you do good to your fellow-servants, you will not cease from doing good whatever they do, that your reward may be greater."

Jerome: " Observe how equally in villages, cities, and towns, that is to great as well as small, He preaches the Gospel, not respecting the might of the noble, but the salvation of those that believe. It follows, Teaching in their synagogues; this was His meat, going about to do the will of His Father, and saving by His teaching such as yet believed not."

Glossa Ordinaria: " (non occ.) He taught in their synagogues the Gospel of the Kingdom, as it follows, Preaching the Gospel of the Kingdom."

Saint Remigius: " Understand, ‘of God;’ for though temporal blessings are also proclaimed, yet they are not called The Gospel. Hence the Law was not called a Gospel, because to such as kept it, it held out not heavenly, but earthly, goods."

Jerome: " He first preached and taught, and then proceeded to heal sicknesses, that the works might convince those who would not believe the words. Hence it follows, Healing every sickness and every disease, for to Him alone nothing is impossible."

Glossa Ordinaria: " (ap. Anselm.) By disease we may understand complaints of long standing, by sickness any lesser infirmity."

Saint Remigius: " It should be known that those whom He healed outwardly in their bodies, He also healed inwardly in their souls. Others cannot do this of their own power, but can by God's grace."

Chrysostom: " Nor does Christ's goodness rest here, but He manifests His care for them, opening the bowels of His mercy towards them; whence it follows, And seeing the multitudes, he had compassion upon them."

| Preceded by Matthew 9:34 | Gospel of Matthew; Chapter 9 | Succeeded by Matthew 9:36 |
