= Matthew 9:37 =

- ← 9:36 9:38 →
- Book: Gospel of Matthew
- Christian Bible part: New Testament

Matthew 9:37 is a verse in the ninth chapter of the Gospel of Matthew in the New Testament.

== Content ==
In the original Greek according to Westcott-Hort for this verse is:

Τότε λέγει τοῖς μαθηταῖς αὐτοῦ, Ὁ μὲν θερισμὸς πολύς, οἱ δὲ ἐργάται ὀλίγοι·

In the King James Version of the Bible the text reads:

Then saith he unto his disciples, The harvest truly is plenteous, but the labourers are few;

The New International Version translates the passage as:

Then he said to his disciples, "The harvest is plentiful but the workers are few."

== Analysis ==
MacEvilly and Lapide both believe that the harvest is the many people prepared to receive the Gospel, which had grown up from the seeds planted by Prophets. And that the few workers, are just two: John the Baptist and Christ.

== Commentary from the Church Fathers ==
Saint Remigius: " But when the Son of God looked down from heaven upon the earth, to hear the groans of the captives, straight a great harvest began to ripen; for the multitude of the human race would never have come near to the faith, had not the Author of human salvation looked down from heaven; and it follows, Then said he unto his disciples, The harvest truly is great, but the labourers are few."

Glossa Ordinaria: " (ap. Anselm.) The harvest are those men who can be reaped by the preachers, and separated from the number of the damned, as grain is beaten out from the chaff that it may be laid up in granaries."

Jerome: " The great harvest denotes the multitude of the people; the few labourers, the want of instructors."

Saint Remigius: " For the number of the Apostles was small in comparison of so great crops to be reaped. The Lord exhorts His preachers, that is, the Apostles and their followers, that they should daily desire an increase of their number; Pray ye therefore the Lord of the harvest, that he would send forth labourers into his harvest."

Preceded by Matthew 9:36	Gospel of Matthew; Chapter 9	Succeeded by Matthew 9:38
