= Matthew 9:38 =

- ← 9:37 10:1 →
- Book: Gospel of Matthew
- Christian Bible part: New Testament

Matthew 9:38 is the final verse in the ninth chapter of the Gospel of Matthew in the New Testament.

== Content ==
In the original Greek according to Westcott-Hort, this verse reads:

δεήθητε οὖν τοῦ Κυρίου τοῦ θερισμοῦ, ὅπως ἐκβάλῃ ἐργάτας εἰς τὸν θερισμὸν αὐτοῦ.

In the King James Version of the Bible, the text reads:

Pray ye therefore the Lord of the harvest, that he will send forth labourers into his harvest.

The New International Version translates the passage as:

Ask the Lord of the harvest, therefore, to send out workers into his harvest field.

== Analysis ==
There is some debate about whether "the Lord of the harvest" means Jesus, or God the Father. Jesus calls His Father "the Lord of the vineyard" in Matthew 21:40, and "the husbandman" in John 15:1. However, the term could also refer to Jesus, who sends out his the labourers, i.e. the apostles: see the quotation from John Chrysostom below. These labourers are alluded to in Psalm 126, "who sow in tears, shall reap in exultation", and are to be contrasted with the false labourers spoken of in Jeremiah 23:21, "I did not send prophets, yet they ran: I have not spoken to them, yet they prophesied."

Johann Bengel sees in this verse an illustration of the importance of prayer:

See of how great value prayers are. The Lord of the harvest Himself wishes Himself to be moved by them.

== Commentary from the Church Fathers ==
Chrysostom: "He privately insinuates Himself to be the Lord; for it is He Himself who is Lord of the harvest. For if He sent the Apostles to reap what they had not sown, it is manifest that He sent them not to reap the things of others, but what He had sown by the Prophets. But since the twelve Apostles are the labourers, He said, Pray ye the Lord of the harvest, that he would send labourers into his harvest; and notwithstanding He added none to their number, but rather He multiplied those twelve many times, not by increasing their numbers, but by giving them more abundant grace."

Saint Remigius: "Or, He then increased their number when He chose the seventy and two, and then when many preachers were made what time the Holy Spirit descended upon the believers."

Chrysostom: "He shews us that it is a great gift that one should have the power of rightly preaching, in that He tells them that they ought to pray for it. Also we are here reminded of the words of John concerning the threshing-floor, and the fan, the chaff, and the wheat."

Hilary of Poitiers: "Figuratively; When salvation was given to the Gentiles, then all cities and towns were enlightened by the power and entrance of Christ, and escaped every former sickness and infirmity. The Lord pities the people troubled with the violence of the unclean Spirit, and sick under the burden of the Law, and having no shepherd at hand to bestow on them the guardianship of the Holy Spirit. But of that gift there was a most abundant fruit, whose plenty far exceeded the multitude of those that drank thereof; how many soever take of it, yet an inexhaustible supply remains; and because it is profitable that there should be many to minister it, He bids us ask the Lord of the harvest, that God would provide a supply of reapers for the ministration of that gift of the Holy Spirit which was made ready; for by prayer this gift is poured out upon us from God."

Preceded by Matthew 9:37	Gospel of Matthew; Chapter 9	Succeeded by Matthew 10:1
