= Matthew 10:3 =

- ← 10:2 10:4 →
- "Jesus calling the Apostles", a stained-glass panel in Most Sacred Heart of Jesus Roman Catholic Church in Hawi, Kohala, Hawaii.
- Book: Gospel of Matthew
- Christian Bible part: New Testament

Matthew 10:3 is the third verse in the tenth chapter of the Gospel of Matthew in the New Testament.

== Content ==
In the original Greek according to Westcott-Hort for this verse is:

Φίλιππος, καὶ Βαρθολομαῖος· Θωμᾶς, καὶ Ματθαῖος ὁ τελώνης· Ἰάκωβος ὁ τοῦ Ἀλφαίου, καὶ Λεββαῖος ὁ ἐπικληθεὶς Θαδδαῖος·

In the King James Version of the Bible the text reads:

Philip, and Bartholomew; Thomas, and Matthew the publican; James the son of Alphaeus, and Lebbaeus, whose surname was Thaddaeus;

The New International Version translates the passage as:

Philip and Bartholomew; Thomas and Matthew the tax collector; James son of Alphaeus, and Thaddaeus;

== Analysis ==
Bartholomew is traditionally identified with Nathanael from the Gospel of John. James' father is mentioned to distinguish him from his better known namesake from verse 2 and James, brother of Jesus. Lapide says that Philip is from the Greek words φίλος ἵππων ("a lover of horses"). Thomas, in Greek, is Didymus, a twin. Thaddæus is the same as Jude. MacEvilly notes the humility of Matthew in calling himself a publican.

== Commentary from the Church Fathers ==
Philip and Bartholomew. Philip is interpreted, ‘The mouth of a lamp,’ or ‘of lamps,’ because when he had been enlightened by the Lord, he straightway sought to communicate the light to his brother by the means of his mouth. Bartholomew is a Syriac, not a Hebrew, name, and is interpreted ‘The son of him that raiseth watera,’ that is, of Christ, who raises the hearts of His preachers from earthly to heavenly things, and hangs them there, that the more they penetrate heavenly things, the more they should steep and inebriate the hearts of their hearers with the droppings of holy preaching."

Jerome: " The other Evangelists in this pair of names put Matthew before Thomas; and do not add, the Publican, that they should not seem to throw scorn upon the Evangelist by bringing to mind his former life. But writing of himself he both puts Thomas first in the pair, and styles himself the Publican; because, where sin hath abounded, there grace shall much more abound. (Rom. 5:20.)"

Saint Remigius: "Thomas is interpreted ‘an abyss,’ or ‘a twin,’ which in Greek is Didymus. Rightly is Didymus interpreted an abyss, for the longer he doubted the more deeply did he believe the effect of the Lord's passion, and the mystery of His Divinity, which forced him to cry, My Lord and my God. (John 20:28.) Matthew is interpreted ‘given,’ because by the Lord's bounty he was made an Evangelist of a Publican."

Rabanus Maurus: "This James is he who in the Gospels, and also in the Epistle to the Galatians, is called the Lord’s brother. For Mary the wife of Alphæus was the sister of Mary the mother of the Lord; John the Evangelist calls her Mary the wife of Cleophas, probably because Cleophas and Alphæus were the same person. Or Mary herself on the death of Alphæus after the birth of James married Cleophas."

Saint Remigius: " It is well said, the son of Alphæus, that is, ‘of the just,’ or ‘the learned;’ for he not only overthrew the vices of the flesh, but also despised all care of the same. And of what he was worthy the Apostles are witness, who ordained him Bishop of the Church of Jerusalem. And ecclesiastical history among other things tells of him, that he never ate flesh, drunk neither wine nor strong drink, abstained from the bath and linen garments, and night and day prayed on his bended knees. And so great was his merit, that he was called by all men, ‘The just.’ Thaddæus is the same whom Luke calls Jude of James, (that is, the brother of James,) whose Epistle is read in the Church, in which he calls himself the brother of James."

Augustine: "Some copies have Lebbæus; but whoever prevented the same man from having two, or even three different names?"

Saint Remigius: " Jude is interpreted ‘having confessed,’ because he confessed the Son of God."

Rabanus Maurus: " Thaddæus or Lebbæus is interpreted ‘a little heart,’ that is, a heart-worshipper."

Preceded by Matthew 10:2	Gospel of Matthew; Chapter 10	Succeeded by Matthew 10:4
