= Matthew 9:34 =

- ← 9:33 9:35 →
- Book: Gospel of Matthew
- Christian Bible part: New Testament

Matthew 9:34 is a verse in the ninth chapter of the Gospel of Matthew in the New Testament.

== Content ==
In the original Greek according to Westcott-Hort for this verse is:

Οἱ δὲ Φαρισαῖοι ἔλεγον, Ἐν τῷ ἄρχοντι τῶν δαιμονίων ἐκβάλλει τὰ δαιμόνια.

In the King James Version of the Bible the text reads:

But the Pharisees said, He casteth out devils through the prince of the devils.

The New International Version translates the passage as:

But the Pharisees said, "It is by the prince of demons that he drives out demons."

== Analysis ==
See Jesus exorcising a mute.

Lapide notes that from the Pharisees statement it appears that there are different orders of demons, just as there are ranks in angelic orders. He goes on further to say, "thus even among rebel soldiers there are standard-bearers, colonels, captains. For without these an army cannot be marshalled and governed. Lucifer is the prince of all the devils, as St. Michael is of all the angels." In Matt 12:15 Jesus deals more sharply with the accusation but here he merely answers with more miracles.

== Commentary from the Church Fathers ==
Chrysostom: " They set Him thus above others, because He not only healed, but with such ease, and quickness; and cured diseases both infinite in number, and in quality incurable. This most grieved the Pharisees, that they set Him before all others, not only those that then lived, but all who had lived before, on which account it follows, But the Pharisees said, He casteth out dæmons through the Prince of dæmons."

Saint Remigius: " Thus the Scribes and Pharisees denied such of the Lord’s miracles as they could deny; and such as they could not they explained by an evil interpretation, according to that, In the multitude of thy excellency thy enemies shall lie unto thee. (Ps. 66:3.)"

Chrysostom: " What can be more foolish than this speech of theirs? For it cannot be pretended that one dæmon would cast out another; for they are wont to consent to one another’s deeds, and not to be at variance among themselves. But Christ not only cast out dæmons, but healed the lepers, raised the dead, forgave sins, preached the kingdom of God, and brought men to the Father, which a dæmon neither could nor would do."

Rabanus Maurus: " Figuratively; As in the two blind men were denoted both nations, Jews and Gentiles, so in the man dumb and afflicted with the dæmon is denoted the whole human race."

Hilary of Poitiers: " Or; By the dumb and deaf, and dæmoniae, is signified the Gentile world, needing health in every part; for sunk in evil of every kind, they are afflicted with disease of every part of the body."

Saint Remigius: " For the Gentiles were dumb; not being able to open their mouth in the confession of the true faith, and the praises of the Creator, or because in paying worship to dumb idols they were made like unto them. They were afflicted with a dæmon, because by dying in unbelief they were made subject to the power of the Devil."

Hilary of Poitiers: " But by the knowledge of God the frenzy of superstition being chased away, the sight, the hearing, and the word of salvation is brought in to them."

Jerome: " As the blind receive light, so the tongue of the dumb is loosed, that he may confess Him whom before he denied. The wonder of the multitude is the confession of the nations. The scoff of the Pharisees is the unbelief of the Jews, which is to this day."

Hilary of Poitiers: " The wonder of the multitude is followed up by the confession, It was never so seen in Israel; because he, for whom there was no help under the Law, is saved by the power of the Word."

Saint Remigius: " They who brought the dumb to be healed by the Lord, signify the Apostles and preachers, who brought the Gentile people to be saved before the face of divine mercy."

Augustine: " This account of the two blind men and the dumb dæmon is read in Matthew only. The two blind men of whom the others speak are not the same as these, though something similar was done with them. So that even if Matthew had not also recorded their cure, we might have seen that this present narrative was of a different transaction. And this we ought diligently to remember, that many actions of our Lord are very much like one another, but are proved not to be the same action, by being both related at different times by the same Evangelist. So that when we find cases in which one is recorded by one Evangelist, and another by another, and some difference which we cannot reconcile between their accounts, we should suppose that they are like, but not the same, events."

| Preceded by Matthew 9:33 | Gospel of Matthew; Chapter 9 | Succeeded by Matthew 9:35 |
