= Matthew 10:1 =

- ← 9:38 10:2 →
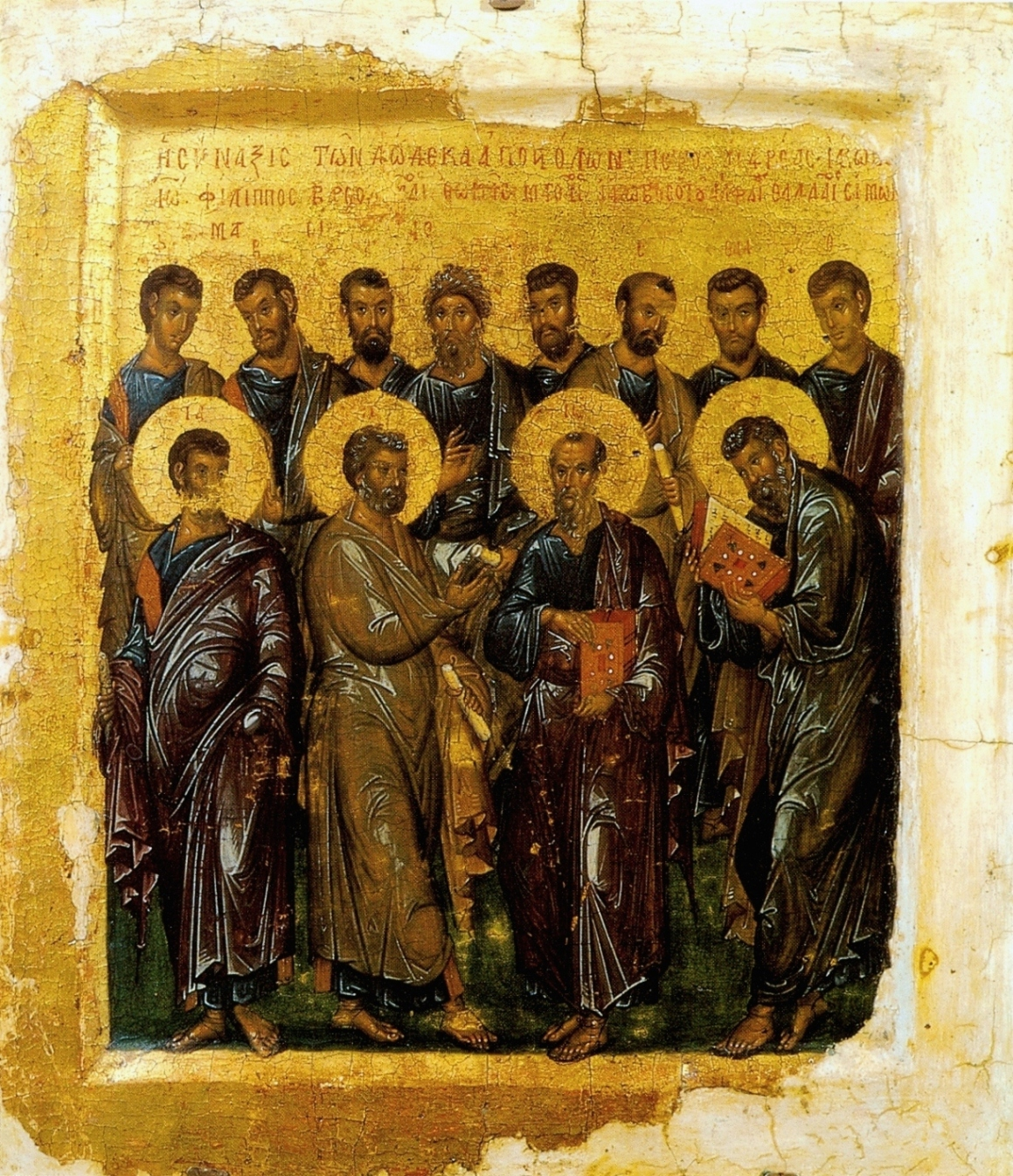
- The Synaxis of the Twelve Apostles. Russian, 14th century, Moscow Museum
- Book: Gospel of Matthew
- Christian Bible part: New Testament

Matthew 10:1 is the first verse of the tenth chapter of the Gospel of Matthew in the New Testament. In this verse, Jesus gathers his disciples and grants them healing powers in what is known as the commissioning the twelve apostles.

== Content ==
The original Koine Greek, according to Westcott and Hort, reads:

και προσκαλεσαμενος τους δωδεκα μαθητας αυτου εδωκεν αυτοις εξουσιαν πνευματων
ακαθαρτων ωστε εκβαλλειν αυτα και θεραπευειν πασαν νοσον και πασαν μαλακιαν

In the King James Version of the Bible it is translated as:

And when he had called unto him his twelve disciples, he gave them power against unclean
spirits, to cast them out, and to heal all manner of sickness and all manner of disease.

The modern World English Bible translates the passage as:

He called to himself his twelve disciples, and gave them authority over unclean
spirits, to cast them out, and to heal every disease and every sickness.

For a collection of other versions, see BibRef Matthew 10:1.

== Analysis ==
According to the accepted theory of Markan priority, this verse is a reworking of parts of Mark 3:13–15, which describes the gathering of the twelve, and Mark 6:7, which describes Jesus giving them authority over unclean spirits. Matthew drops the mention of the meeting of the disciples taking place upon a mountain, as he has already used that passage to set the location of the Sermon on the Mount at Matthew 5:1. Eduard Schweizer considers this verse a somewhat awkward insertion of Markan material into Matthew's narrative. It seems to contradict what is implied at Matthew 9:38. Matthew also jumps immediately to there being twelve disciples. Previously Matthew 4 had mentioned the recruitment of the four fishers, and Matthew 9 introduces Matthew the tax collector, but there is nothing in the text introducing the other seven. This same material also appears at Luke 6:12–13 and Luke 9:1.

Matthew also introduces the group of twelve later in his narrative than the other gospel writers. He had earlier mentioned the collection of disciples at a number of points earlier, but had left their number undefined. Other parts of the New Testament, such as Mark 3:16 and 1 Corinthians 15:5, make clear that Jesus had more than only twelve followers, and that this group of twelve consists of the leaders of the organization.

The different gospels have different lists of the names of the disciples, but one fact they are agreed upon is that there were twelve. This could be evidence for the historicity of their being twelve original followers of Jesus, The number twelve also had deep social and religious significance. The number creates a metaphorical link to the Twelve Tribes of Israel. At the time most Jewish leaders believed that the messiah would bring about an eschatological restoration of the tribes. This link is made explicit at Matthew 19:28. The Qumran community, which produced the Dead Sea Scrolls, also had a group of twelve leaders, perhaps for similar reasons. In the culture of the time, a group of twelve indicated a complete set, and readers would thus consider a number slightly below or above twelve to be odd.

Jesus gives the disciples powers to heal. Just as Matthew's reference to Jesus' twelve selected disciples comes as a surprise to his readers, Verna Holyhead suggests that Jesus' charge to them to become healers of "every disease and every affliction" might also have come to them as a surprise. The ability of one miracle worker to train others is found in the Old Testament as well, such as the education of Elisha by Elijah. The Greek makes clear that healing illnesses and casting out spirits were two parts of the same act, a reflection of the common belief at the time that diseases were caused by demonic possession. Throughout the New Testament, the power to conduct such exorcisms is one of the leading examples of spiritual power.

== Commentary from the Church Fathers ==
Glossa Ordinaria: "From the healing of Peter's wife's mother to this place, there has been a continued succession of miracles; and they were done before the Sermon upon the Mount, as we know for certain from Matthew's call, which is placed among them; for he was one of the twelve chosen to the Apostleship upon the mount. He here returns to the order of events, taking it up again at the healing of the centurion's servant; saying, And calling to him his twelve disciples."

Saint Remigius: "The Evangelist had related above that the Lord exhorted His disciples to pray the Lord of the harvest to send labourers into His vineyard; and He now seems to be fulfilling what He had exhorted them to. For the number twelve is a perfect number, being made up of the number six, which has perfection because it is formed of its own parts, one, two, three, multiplied into one another; and the number six when doubled amounts to twelve."

Glossa Ordinaria: "And this doubling seems to have some reference to the two precepts of charity, or to the two Testaments."

Bede: "For the number twelve, which is made up of three into four, denotes that through the four quarters of the world they were to preach the faith of the holy Trinity."

Rabanus Maurus: "This number is typified by many things in the Old Testament; by the twelve sons of Jacob, by the twelve princes of the children of Israel, by the twelve running springs in Helim, by the twelve stones in Aaron’s breastplate, by the twelve loaves of the show-bread, by the twelve spies sent by Moses, by the twelve stones of which the altar was made, by the twelve stones taken out of Jordan, by the twelve oxen which bare the brazen sea. Also in the New Testament, by the twelve stars in the bride’s crown, by the twelve foundations of Jerusalem which John saw, and her twelve gates."

Chrysostom: "He makes them confident not only by calling their ministry a sending forth to the harvest, but by giving them strength for the ministry; whence it follows, He gave them power over all unclean spirits to cast them out, and to heal every sickness and every disease."

Saint Remigius: "Wherein is openly showed that the multitude were troubled not with one single kind of affliction, but with many, and this was His pity for the multitude, to give His disciples power to heal and cleanse them."

| Preceded by Matthew 9:38 | Gospel of Matthew; Chapter 10 | Succeeded by Matthew 10:2 |
