= Matthew 10:5 =

- ← 10:4 10:6 →
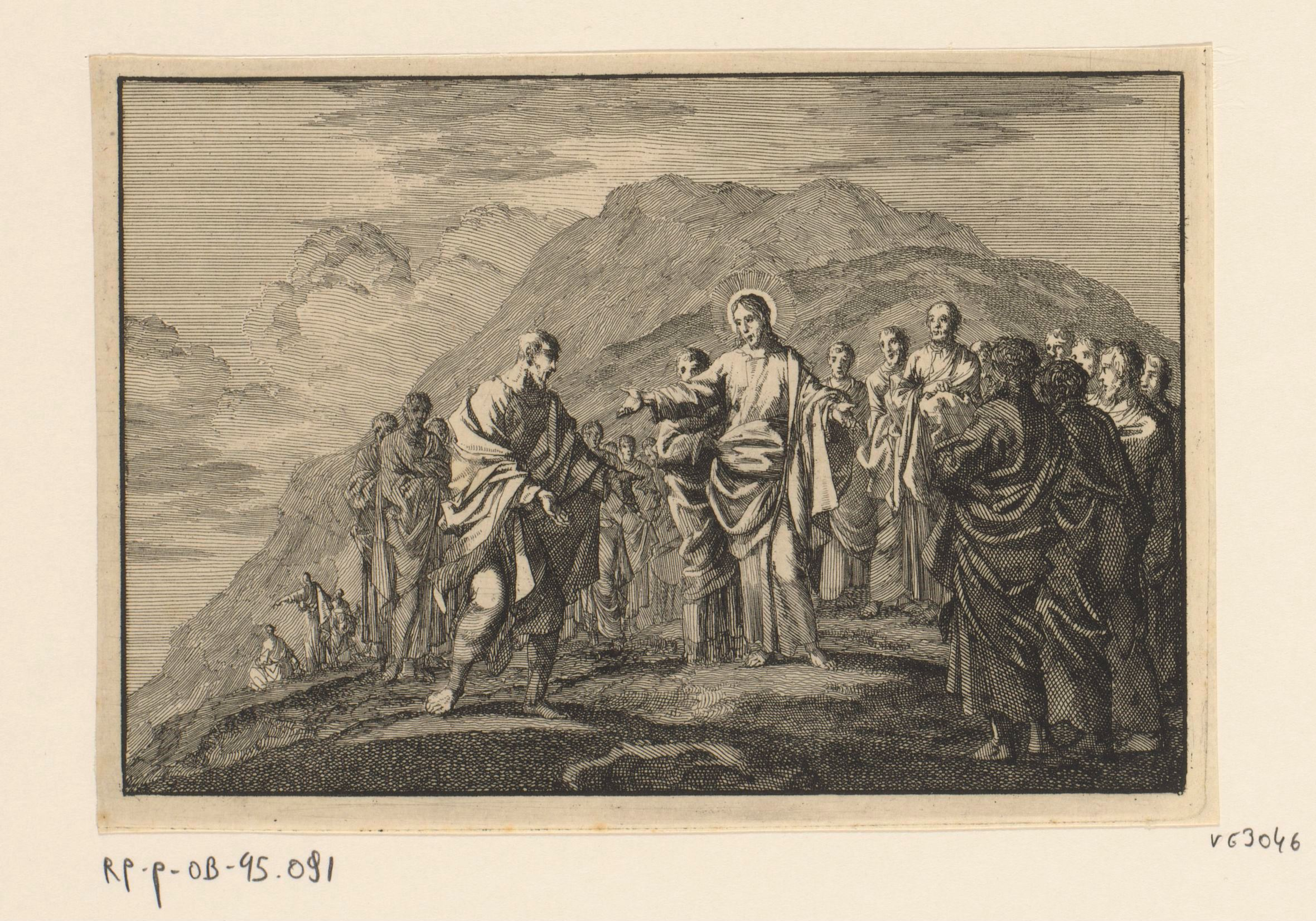
- Jesus Christ sent out the twelve apostles. Pieter Mortier (1703).
- Book: Gospel of Matthew
- Christian Bible part: New Testament

Matthew 10:5 is the fifth verse in the tenth chapter of the Gospel of Matthew in the New Testament. In sending out the apostles on their first mission, Jesus directs them as to where they are not to go.

== Content ==
In the original Greek according to Westcott-Hort, this verse is:

Τούτους τοὺς δώδεκα ἀπέστειλεν ὁ Ἰησοῦς, παραγγείλας αὐτοῖς, λέγων, Εἰς ὁδὸν ἐθνῶν μὴ ἀπέλθητε, καὶ εἰς πόλιν Σαμαρειτῶν μὴ εἰσέλθητε·

In the King James Version of the Bible the text reads:

These twelve Jesus sent forth, and commanded them, saying, Go not into the way of the Gentiles, and into any city of the Samaritans enter ye not:

The New International Version translates the passage as:

These twelve Jesus sent out with the following instructions: "Do not go among the Gentiles or enter any town of the Samaritans".

== Analysis ==
Cornelius a Lapide notes that the first precept of Christ is to only go to the Jews, and not the Gentiles or Samaritans. Saint Jerome and Robert Witham both state that this restriction does not contradict the verse in Matthew 28:19, "Go, teach all nations", since this was said to them after the resurrection. Matthew Henry comments that "the Gentiles must not have the gospel brought them, till the Jews have refused it".

== Commentary from Church Fathers ==
Glossa Ordinaria: "Because the manifestation of the Spirit, as the Apostle speaks, is given for the profit of the Church, after bestowing His power on the Apostles, He sends them that they may exercise this power for the good of others."

Chrysostom: "Observe the propriety of the time in which they are sent. After they had seen the dead raised, the sea rebuked, and other like wonders, and had had both in word and deed sufficient proof of His excellent power, then He sends them."

Glossa Ordinaria: "When He sends them, He teaches them whither they should go, what they should preach, and what they should do. And first, whither they should go; Giving them commandment, and saying, Go ye not into the way of the Gentiles, and into any city of the Samaritans enter ye not; hut go ye rather to the lost sheep of the house of Israel."

Jerome: "This passage does not contradict the command which He gave afterwards, Go and teach all nations; for this was before His resurrection, that was after. And it behoved the coming of Christ to be preached to the Jews first, that they might not have any just plea, or say that they were rejected of the Lord, who sent the Apostles to the Gentiles and Samaritans."

Chrysostom: "Also they were sent to the Jews first, in order that being trained in Judæa, as in a palæstra, they might enter on the arena of the world to contend; thus He taught them like weak nestlings to fly."

Gregory the Great: "Or He would be first preached to Judæa and afterwards to the Gentiles, in order that the preaching of the Redeemer should seem to seek out foreign lands only because it had been rejected in His own. There were also at that time some among the Jews who should be called, and among the Gentiles some who were not to be called, as being unworthy of being renewed to life, and yet not deserving of the aggravated punishment which would ensue upon their rejection of the Apostles’ preaching."

Hilary of Poitiers: "The promulgation of the Law deserved also the first preaching of the Gospel; and Israel was to have less excuse for its crime, as it had experienced more care in being warned."

Chrysostom: "Also that they should not suppose that they were hated of Christ because they had reviled Him, and branded Him as demoniac, He sought first their cure, and withholding His disciples from all other nations, He sent this people physicians and teachers; and not only forbid them to preach to any others before the Jews, but would not that they should so much as approach the way that led to the Gentiles; Go not into the way of the Gentiles. And because the Samaritans, though more readily disposed to be converted to the faith, were yet at enmity with the Jews, He would not suffer the Samaritans to be preached to before the Jews."

Glossa Ordinaria: "The Samaritans were Gentiles who had been settled in the land of Israel by the king of Assyria after the captivity which he made. They had been driven by many terrors to turn to Judaism, and had received circumcision and the five books of Moses, but renouncing every thing else; hence there was no communication between the Jews and the Samaritans."

Chrysostom: "From these then He diverts his disciples, and sends them to the children of Israel, whom He calls perishing sheep, not straying; in every way contriving an apology for them, and drawing them to Himself."

Hilary of Poitiers: "Though they are here called sheep, yet they raged against Christ with the tongues and throats of wolves and vipers."

Jerome: "Figuratively; Herein we who bear the name of Christ are commanded not to walk in the way of the Gentiles, or the error of the heretics, but as we are separate in religion, that we be also separate in our life."

== Uses ==
- This verse is quoted in the chapter 26 of Didascalia Apostolorum, an ancient Christian teaching book from 230 AD.

Preceded by Matthew 10:4	Gospel of Matthew; Chapter 10	Succeeded by Matthew 10:6
