= Matthew 9:32 =

- ← 9:31 9:33 →
- Book: Gospel of Matthew
- Christian Bible part: New Testament

Matthew 9:32 is a verse in the ninth chapter of the Gospel of Matthew in the New Testament.

== Content ==
In the original Greek according to Westcott-Hort for this verse is:

Αὐτῶν δὲ ἐξερχομένων, ἰδού, προσήνεγκαν αὐτῷ ἄνθρωπον κωφὸν δαιμονιζόμενον.

In the King James Version of the Bible the text reads:

As they went out, behold, they brought to him a dumb man possessed with a devil.

The New International Version translates the passage as:

While they were going out, a man who was demon-possessed and could not talk was brought to Jesus.

== Analysis ==
There is a divided opinion as to whether the man was dumb before he was demon-possessed. MacEvilly believes it was the work of the demon, since the demon is called "mute" in Luke 11:4. However some believe the dumb man in Matt 12 is the same as the one in Luke 11:4 and not this one.

== Commentary from the Church Fathers ==
Saint Remigius: " Observe the beautiful order of His miracles; how after He had given sight to the blind, He restored speech to the dumb, and healed the possessed of the dæmon; by which He shows Himself the Lord of power, and the author of the heavenly medicine. For it was said by Isaiah, Then shall the eyes of the blind be opened, the ears of the deaf shall be unstopped, and the tongue of the dumb loosed. (Is. 35:6.) Whence it is said, When they were gone forth, they brought unto him a man dumb, and possessed with a dæmon."

Jerome: " The Greek word here (κωφὸς) is more frequent in common speech in the sense of ‘deaf,’ but it is the manner of Scripture to use it indifferently as either."

Preceded by Matthew 9:31	Gospel of Matthew; Chapter 9	Succeeded by Matthew 9:33
