= Matthew 9:33 =

- ← 9:32 9:34 →
- Book: Gospel of Matthew
- Christian Bible part: New Testament

Matthew 9:33 is a verse in the ninth chapter of the Gospel of Matthew in the New Testament.

== Content ==
In the original Greek according to Westcott-Hort for this verse is:

Καὶ ἐκβληθέντος τοῦ δαιμονίου, ἐλάλησεν ὁ κωφός· καὶ ἐθαύμασαν οἱ ὄχλοι, λέγοντες ὅτι Οὐδέποτε ἐφάνη οὕτως ἐν τῷ Ἰσραήλ.

In the King James Version of the Bible the text reads:

And when the devil was cast out, the dumb spake: and the multitudes marvelled, saying, It was never so seen in Israel.

The New International Version translates the passage as:

And when the demon was driven out, the man who had been mute spoke. The crowd was amazed and said, "Nothing like this has ever been seen in Israel."

== Analysis ==
This miracle is said to fulfill the prophecy of Isaiah (chap. 35), "Then shall the eyes of the blind be opened, and the ears of the deaf shall be unstopped, and the tongue of the dumb shall sing." Lapide believes that from this it seems that the demon had made the man deaf and dumb, who was not so before.

== Commentary from the Church Fathers ==
Chrysostom: " This was not a mere natural defect; but was from the malignity of the dæmon; and therefore he needed to be brought of others, for he could not ask any thing of others as living without voice, and the dæmon chaining his spirit together with his tongue. Therefore Christ does not require faith of him, but immediately healed his disorder; as it follows, And when the dæmon was cast out, the dumb spake."

Hilary of Poitiers: " The natural order of things is here preserved; the dæmon is first cast out, and there the functions of the members proceed. And the multitude marvelled, saying, It was never so seen in Israel."

Preceded by Matthew 9:32	Gospel of Matthew; Chapter 9	Succeeded by Matthew 9:34
