= Matthew 9:36 =

- ← 9:35 9:37 →
- Book: Gospel of Matthew
- Christian Bible part: New Testament

Matthew 9:36 is a verse in the ninth chapter of the Gospel of Matthew in the New Testament.

== Content ==
In the original Greek wording for this verse, according to Westcott-Hort, is:

Ἰδὼν δὲ τοὺς ὄχλους, ἐσπλαγχνίσθη περὶ αὐτῶν, ὅτι ἦσαν ἐκλελυμένοι καὶ ἐρριμμένοι ὡσεὶ πρόβατα μὴ ἔχοντα ποιμένα.

In the King James Version of the Bible the text reads:

But when he saw the multitudes, he was moved with compassion on them, because they fainted, and were scattered abroad, as sheep having no shepherd.

The New International Version translates the passage as:

When he saw the crowds, he had compassion on them, because they were harassed and helpless, like sheep without a shepherd.

== Analysis ==
The Greek word for compassion is ἐσπλαγχνίσθη, which is "pitied them from His inmost bowels". Cornelius a Lapide notes that "there is no animal so simple, careless, improvident, so exposed to be the prey of wolves and other wild beasts, and therefore so needing a keeper, as a sheep". John McEvilly comments that it appears that the Scribes and Pharisees of that time were not taking on the role of being shepherds as they should have.

== Commentary from the Church Fathers ==
Saint Remigius: "Herein Christ shews in Himself the disposition of the good shepherd and not that of the hireling. Why He pitied them is added, Because they were troubled, and sick as sheep that have no shepherd—troubled either by dæmons, or by divers sicknesses and infirmities."

Glossa Ordinaria: "(ap. Anselm.) Or, troubled by dæmons, and sick, that is, benumbed and unable to rise; and though they had shepherds, yet they were as though they had them not."

Chrysostom: "This is an accusation against the rulers of the Jews, that being shepherds they appeared like wolves; not only not improving the multitude, but hindering their progress. For when the multitude marvelled and said, It was never so seen in Israel, these opposed themselves, saying, He casteth out dæmons by the prince of the dæmons. (vid. Psalm 102:19.)"

== Later usage ==
The Second Vatican Council drew from this verse the expectation that the Church "would have its priests to the end of time, and that Christians would never be like sheep without a shepherd".

| Preceded by Matthew 9:35 | Gospel of Matthew; Chapter 9 | Succeeded by Matthew 9:37 |
