= Matthew 10:4 =

- ← 10:3 10:5 →
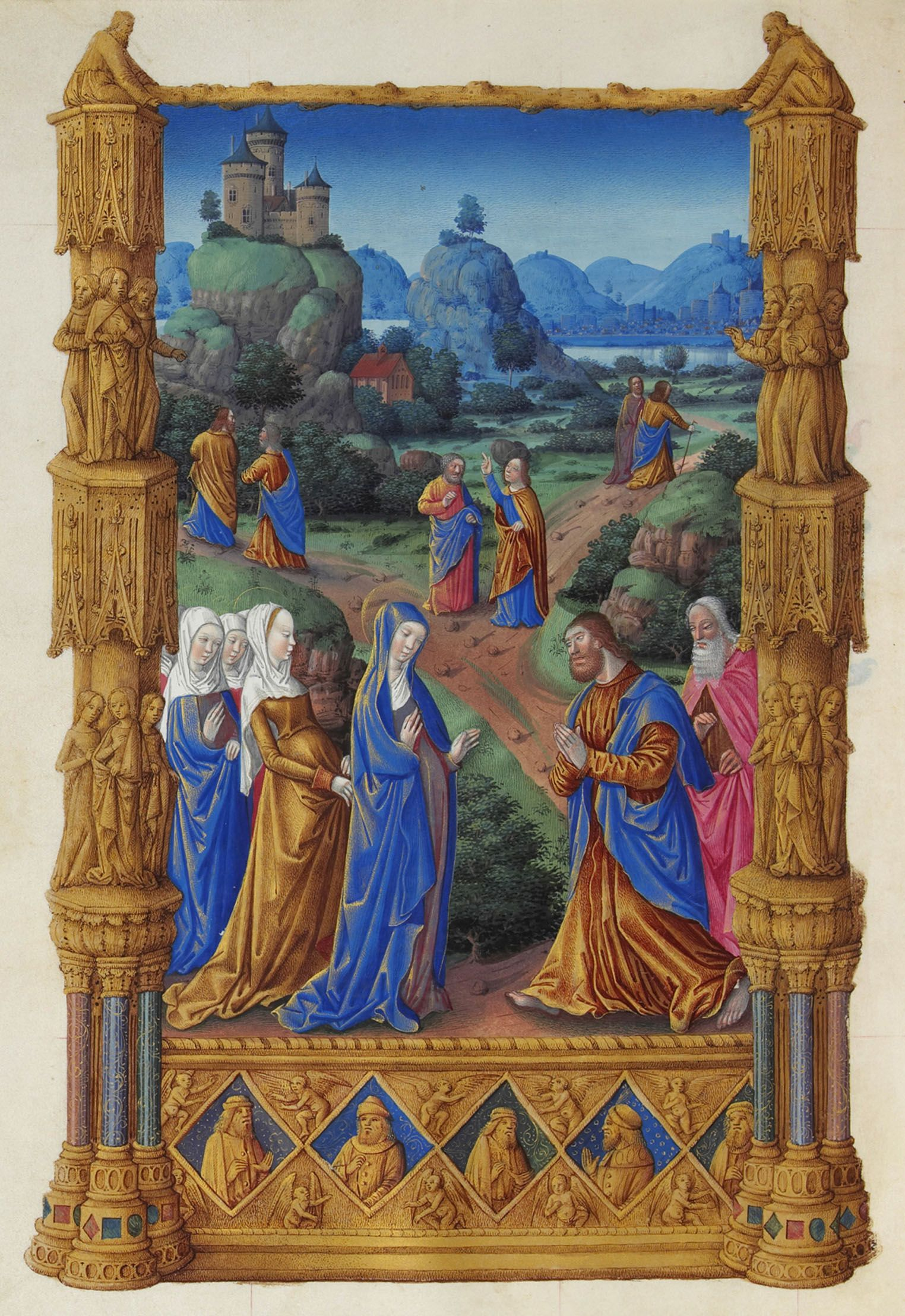
- "The Apostles Going Forth to Preach", Les Très Riches Heures du duc de Berry, Folio 122v, the Musée Condé, Chantilly.
- Book: Gospel of Matthew
- Christian Bible part: New Testament

Matthew 10:4 is the fourth verse in the tenth chapter of the Gospel of Matthew in the New Testament.

== Content ==
In the original Greek according to Westcott-Hort this verse is:

Σίμων ὁ Κανανίτης, καὶ Ἰούδας ὁ Ἰσκαριώτης ὁ καὶ παραδοὺς αὐτόν.

In the King James Version of the Bible the text reads:

Simon the Canaanite, and Judas Iscariot, who also betrayed him.

The New International Version translates the passage as:

Simon the Zealot and Judas Iscariot, who betrayed him.

== Analysis ==
Lapide states that Simon the Canaanite is not from the Canaanite people in whose land the Hebrews took, but rather because he was born at Cana of Galilee. Luke calls him "Zealot", thus probably this word comes from Aramaic qan'ana' that means zeal. MacEvilly believes that Judas was chosen by Christ to complete his passion, and to add to "the weight of His Passion."

== Commentary from the Church Fathers ==
Jerome: "Simon Chananæus is the same who in the other Evangelist is called Zelotes. Chana signifies ‘Zeal.’ Judas is named Scarioth, either from the town in which he was born, or from the tribe of Issachar, a prophetic omen of his sin; for Issachar means ‘a booty,’ thus signifying the reward of the betrayer."

Saint Remigius: " Scarioth is interpreted ‘The memory of the Lord,’ because he followed the Lord; or ‘The memorial of death,’ because he plotted in his heart how he might betray the Lord to death; or ‘strangling,’ because he went and hanged himself. It should be known that there are two disciples of this name, who are types of all Christians; Jude the brother of James, of such as persevere in the confession of the faith; Jude Scarioth of such as leave the faith; and turn back again."

Glossa Ordinaria: "They are named two and two to express their union as yoke-fellows."

Augustine: "These therefore He chose for His disciples, whom also He named Apostles, humbly born without honour, without learning, that whatever they should do that was great, it was He that should be in them and should do it. He had among them one that was evil, whom He should use in the accomplishment of His Passion, and who should be an example to His Church of suffering evil men."

Ambrose: "He was not chosen among the Apostles unwittingly; for that truth is great, which cannot be harmed even by having an adversary in one of its own ministers."

Rabanus Maurus: " Also He willed to be betrayed by a disciple, that you when betrayed by your intimate might bear patiently that your judgment has erred, that your favours have been thrown away."

Preceded by Matthew 10:3	Gospel of Matthew; Chapter 10	Succeeded by Matthew 10:5
