= Matthew 10:2 =

- ← 10:1 10:3 →
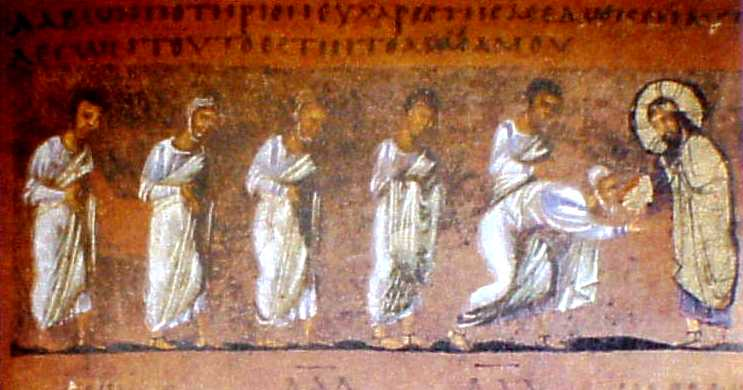
- Miniature of the procession of the Apostles from the Rossano Gospels.
- Book: Gospel of Matthew
- Christian Bible part: New Testament

Matthew 10:2 is the second verse in the tenth chapter of the Gospel of Matthew in the New Testament.

== Content ==
In the original Greek according to Westcott-Hort for this verse is:

Τῶν δὲ δώδεκα ἀποστόλων τὰ ὀνόματά ἐστι ταῦτα· πρῶτος Σίμων ὁ λεγόμενος Πέτρος, καὶ Ἀνδρέας ὁ ἀδελφὸς αὐτοῦ· Ἰάκωβος ὁ τοῦ Ζεβεδαίου, καὶ Ἰωάννης ὁ ἀδελφὸς αὐτοῦ·

In the King James Version of the Bible the text reads:

Now the names of the twelve apostles are these; The first, Simon, who is called Peter, and Andrew his brother; James the son of Zebedee, and John his brother;

The New International Version translates the passage as:

These are the names of the twelve apostles: first, Simon (who is called Peter) and his brother Andrew; James son of Zebedee, and his brother John;

== Analysis ==
In this verse we find Simon Peter placed first, even though he was called after his brother Andrew (see primacy of Peter). Some Roman Catholics will cite this verse to argue for the primacy of the Roman see which Peter founded. It is said that Christ chose twelve apostles to correspond to the twelve Patriarchs, the sons of Jacob. Because just as these were the fathers of the Jewish people, so were the apostles to be the parents of all Christians.

== Commentary from the Church Fathers ==
Jerome: " A kind and merciful Lord and Master does not envy His servants and disciples a share in His powers. As Himself had cured every sickness and disease, He imparted the same power to His Apostles. But there is a wide difference between having and imparting, between giving and receiving. Whatever He does He does with the power of a master, whatever they do it is with confession of their own weakness, as they speak, In the name of Jesus rise and walk. (Acts 3:6.) A catalogue of the names of the Apostles is given, that all false Apostles might be excluded. The names of the twelve Apostles are these; First, Simon who is called Peter, and Andrew his brother. To arrange them in order according to their merit is His alone who searches the secrets of all hearts. But Simon is placed first, having the surname of Peter given to distinguish him from the other Simon surnamed Chananæus, from the village of Chana in Galilee where the Lord turned the water into wine."

Rabanus Maurus: "The Greek or Latin ‘Petrus’ is the same as the Syriac Cephas, in both tongues the word is derived from a rock; undoubtedly that of which Paul speaks, And that rock was Christ. (1 Cor. 10:4.)"

Saint Remigius: "There have been some who in this name Peter, which is Greek and Latin, have sought a Hebrew interpretation, and would have it to signify, ‘Taking off the shoe,’ ‘or unloosing,’ or ‘acknowledging.’ But those that say this are contradicted by two facts. First, that the Hebrew has no letter P, but uses PH instead. Thus Pilate they call Philate. Secondly, that one of the Evangelists has used the word as an interpretation of Cephas; The Lord said, Thou shalt be called Cephas, (John 1:42.) on which the Evangelist adds, which being interpreted is Petrus. Simon is interpreted ‘obedient,’ for he obeyed the words of Andrew, and with him came to Christ, or because he obeyed the divine commands, and at one word of bidding followed the Lord. Or as some will have it, it is to be interpreted, ‘Laying aside grief,’ and, ‘hearing painful things;’ for that on the Lord's resurrection he laid aside the grief he had for His death; and he heard sorrowful things when the Lord said to him, Another shall gird thee, and shall carry thee whither thou wouldest not. (John 21:18.)"

Chrysostom: " This is no small honour (done to Peter), He places Peter from his merit, Andrew from the nobility he had in being the brother of Peter. Mark names Andrew next after the two heads, namely, Peter and John; but this one not so; for Mark has arranged them in order of dignity."

Saint Remigius: " Andrew is interpreted ‘manly;’ for as in Latin ‘virilis’ is derived from ‘vir,’ so in Greek Andrew is derived from ἀνὴρ. Rightly is he called manly, who left all and followed Christ, and manfully persevered in His commands."

Jerome: " The Evangelist couples the names throughout in pairs. So he puts together Peter and Andrew, brothers not so much according to the flesh as in spirit; James and John who left their father after the flesh to follow their true Father; James the son of Zebedee and John his brother. He calls him the son of Zebedee, to distinguish him from the other James the son of Alphæus."

Chrysostom: " Observe that he does not place them according to their dignity; for to me John would seem to be greater not than others only, but even than his brother."

Saint Remigius: "James is interpreted ‘The supplanter,’ or ‘that supplanteth;’ for he not only supplanted the vices of the flesh, but even contemned the same flesh when Herod put him to death. John is interpreted ‘The grace of God,’ because he deserved before all to be loved by the Lord; whence also in the favour of His especial love, he leaned at supper in the Lord's bosom."

Preceded by Matthew 10:1	Gospel of Matthew; Chapter 10	Succeeded by Matthew 10:3
