= Subversive Symmetry =

Subversive Symmetry. Exploring the Fantastic in Mark 6:45-56 is a book written in 1999 by George W. Young, Assistant Professor of Biblical Studies at Queen's College, Newfoundland, Canada. He interprets the New Testament episode of Jesus' walk on water (Mark 6:45-56) by literary critical methods related to fantastic literature.

== Topics covered ==
=== Historical critical exegesis ===
In the first chapter Moving beyond tradition, a historical overview on mainstream exegesis is given.

Young criticizes that naturalistic explanations depend on a historical critical worldview. However, this method of exegesis would fail to capture the full meaning of the text, just like a factual interpretation. Instead, Young proposes to investigate the pericope as narrative art and to apply literary-critical methods to the text in its final redaction by Mark. Hence, he takes the text as fiction, and he chooses tools and terms often associated with fantasy literature.

=== Literary studies of Mark ===
Mark as narrative art gives an overview of literary criticism of Mark. The following chapters highlight methods and parameters of fantastic studies (Introduction to Fantastic Studies and Contours of Fantasy).

=== Interpretation of the narrative ===
In Reading Mark 6:45-56 as fantastic discourse, Young gives a verse by verse interpretation of the episode.

He underlines bidimensionality as a main feature of fantasy: It is situated between the poles of realism and the marvelous or mythic. The episode is anchored in Palestinean geography: The disciples start at the northwestern side of the Sea of Galilee (compare Mk 6,1 and 6,32f.), and they are told to cross the lake in easterly direction to Bethsaida. The first three verses accentuate a three-dimensional separation between Jesus on a mountain and the disciples below in the midst of the sea. This polarization creates a narrative void, where unpredictable events can happen. The concrete spatial structure begins to dissolve, when in v. 48 the disciples' rowing against the wind is described from their perspective; this should not be explained by Jesus' view from a high altitude or his supernatural sight.

Verses 48b - 51 confront two irreconciliable levels of reality: Whereas the disciples remain in the boat, the character of Jesus appears superior to the laws of nature. His sea-walk can only be conceptualized, any placement in three-dimensional space would be absurd, e.g. the question "Did Jesus move with the waves?". A cardinal theme of fantastic narrative is introduced: Vision provides the main epistemological criteria for the ontological question of the real and unreal. The disciples' "conventionalized reality is subverted". Their reaction is fear and astonishment, but they have no words to identify the unspeakable. This astonishment is plausible. Together with the certification via the act of seeing it gives to the marvelous event a high degree of verisimilitude. According to Aristotle, this is a "false inference": Such rhetoric asserts "probable impossibilities".

Jesus' comforting words in v. 50b are rendered in direct speech and present tense. They convey dramatic immediacy at the climax of the story. For a first-century reader, his ὲγώ εἰμι ("I am") without predicate makes allusion to the divine name appearing 175 times within the Septuagint in this form. Young is more interested in the open-ended aspect of the phrase. Together with the absence of the name "Jesus" between Mk 6:30 and 8:27, it creates semantic instability. This "allows the reader to write and re-write endless predicates, since none are given".

The arrival at Gennesaret at the opposite side of Bethsaida has no rational explanation. Once again, it breaks readerly assumptions and even is reported to contradict Jesus' intention. The power operating such a fantastic journey is not named – in ancient narrative the sea was a place of chaos and disorder.

=== Structures of Mark's discourse ===
The Penrose triangle symbolizes the mutual challenge of different perspectives on reality.

The chapters Rhetoric and the reader and Summary and conclusion raise more general issues of Mark's discourse.

The narrator's comment (v. 52) refers to a hidden meaning of the story and the previous feeding of the multitude. In contrast to Jesus' words, the rhetoric narrator accuses the disciples to not recognize Jesus' supernatural, messianic power explicitly, due to their lack of perception. Young considers this condemnation as illogical, since it does neither refer to their realistic view nor to their astonishment as adequate reaction to the supernatural. A monological “hyper-reality” is opposed to the open fantastic structure of the text. The comment may be seen as an instance of an unreliable narrator, which motivates the reader to reconsider his and the narrator's point of views. Overall, the “narrative episode [...] is structured upon a conflicting system of perspectives between the disciples, Jesus/the phantom, and the rhetorical narrator”, like an “impossible triangle”. Reality is beyond objectification. Mark created a multilevel story world with inherent contradictions, “but a world that gropes for superior realities, perceptible only through φαντασία” (phantasia).

The character of Jesus appears as secretive and capricious, his actions as unpredictable and scandalous. In v. 45f., e.g., there is a gap: Jesus only says, but is not reported to really dismiss the crowd (the relative pronoun αὐτοῖς in “and after he had taken leave of them” grammatically refers to the disciples, not the crowd). It appears to be an excuse to separate from the disciples. V. 48c. has often been an enigma: Jesus wants to pass by the disciples, whereas v. 48a suggests that he intends to help them – 8 hours after having seen their distress. Similarly, Mark 5:39 unsettles and contradicts vv. 23 and 35; Mark 7:24ff. contrasts with Jesus' mission directed to everyone (Mark 1:38). George W. Young notes parallels to a Greek “capricious god toying aimlessly with his subjects”.

== Reception ==
The book has been cited by several Old and New Testament studies.

Douglas W. Geyer analyzes Mark 4:35-6:56 under the aspects of “the anomalous frightful”, uncertainty and indeterminacy, which foreshadow the crucifixion. He gives many parallels in ancient historical and literary works.

Camille Focant cites Young's interpretation that in v. 48 the usual spatial structures are dissolved and a fantastic element is introduced into the text when Jesus sees the disciples far away. Furthermore, Jesus' walk on water resists concrete representation. He also judges Jesus' intention to pass by the disciples as curious, but interprets this against the background of Old Testament narratives of theophany like Ex 33:19-22, following John P. Meier and others. Focant criticizes Young's explication of the arrival at Gennesaret as a fantastic event, but does not explain the contradiction to the original destination, Bethsaida, as due to an inattentive compilation of two sources by Mark. Instead, he accepts the narrative analysis by E.S. Malbon: the spirit of the disciples has to be opened to the pagan world before they can arrive in a non-Jewish territory.
