= History (disambiguation) =

History is the study of the past.

History may also refer to:

== General ==
- History of Earth
- Human history
- History of life
- Philosophy of history
- Chronology of the universe

== Arts, entertainment, and media ==
=== Literature ===
- History (Herodotus), properly Histories
- History (Malmesbury) (Gesta Regum Anglorum) of William of Malmesbury
- History (novel), a novel by Elsa Morante
- "History" (short story), a 1941 science fiction by Isaac Asimov
- History, a 1973 book of poems by Robert Lowell
- History of Armenia of Moses of Chorene
- Natural History (Pliny) (Naturalis Historiae) of Pliny the Elder

=== Music ===
==== Groups ====
- History (band), or HISTORY, South Korean pop boy band

==== Albums ====
- History (EP), a 2004 EP by controller.controller
- History (Dune album) (2000)
- History (Jon English album) (2016)
- History (Molly Nilsson album), 2011
- History (Loudon Wainwright III album) (1992)
- History (Matthew West album) (2005)
- History (Yōko Oginome album) (1995)
- HIStory: Past, Present and Future, Book I, a 1995 album by Michael Jackson
- History:, 2011 album by Grime rapper JME
- History: America's Greatest Hits, a 1975 compilation album by America
- History: Function Music, a 2012 album by E-40 and Too Short
- History: Mob Music, a 2012 album by E-40 and Too Short
- History: The Singles 85–91, a 1992 album by New Model Army

==== Songs ====
- "History" (Exo song)
- "History" (Funeral for a Friend song)
- "History" (Joel Corry and Becky Hill song)
- "History" (One Direction song)
- "History" (Story Untold song)
- "History" (The Verve song)
- "HIStory" (song), by Michael Jackson
- "History", a song by Blue System from Backstreet Dreams, 1993
- "History", a song by Cast from All Change, 1995
- "History", a song by Chris Tomlin from Always, 2022
- "History", a song by Girls Aloud from the single "Wake Me Up", 2005
- "History", a song by Groove Armada from Black Light, 2010
- "History", a song by Jay-Z from More than a Game, 2009
- "History", a song by Julia Michaels from Not in Chronological Order, 2021
- "History", a song by Madonna from the single "Jump", 2006
- "History", a song by Megan McKenna from Story of Me, 2018
- "History", a song by Olivia Holt from Olivia, 2016
- "History", a song by Mai Tai, 1985
- "History", a song by Tenacious D from The Pick of Destiny, 2006
- "History", a song by Vassy, 2010
- "History", a song by X Ambassadors from Orion

=== Periodicals ===
- History (journal)
- History: Magazine of the Royal Australian Historical Society
- BBC History, magazine by the British Broadcasting Association

=== Television ===
- History (American TV network) and its regional variants
  - History (Australian TV channel), an Australian version of the channel
  - History (Canadian TV network), a Canadian English language TV channel
  - History en Español, a spin-off channel of The History Channel
  - History (European TV channel)
  - Viasat History, pan-Nordic television channel
  - History TV18, the Indian version of History channel operated by Network18
- HIStory (web series), a Taiwanese streaming drama anthology series

=== Other arts, entertainment, and media ===
- History (theatrical genre)

== Computing ==
- Command history, a feature that allows users to recall, edit and rerun commands that were previously entered
- history (command), an implementation of the command history feature found in many operating system shells
- HISTORY (CONFIG.SYS directive), a console history configuration setting in any issue of DR DOS
- Changelog, or history, a log or record of changes in computer projects
- A database transaction schedule, also called a history, in the fields of databases and transaction processing
- Web browsing history, the log of pages a user has visited on the web

== Other uses ==
- History, a concept in the study of internal validity
- Medical history, the history of a patient
- History (venue), music venues in Ottawa and Toronto, Ontario Canada

== See also ==
- His Story (disambiguation)
- Historia (disambiguation)
- Histoire (disambiguation)
- Histories (disambiguation)
- Hitstory (disambiguation)
- Natural history (disambiguation)
- Her Story (disambiguation)
- Prehistory (disambiguation)
