= His Story (musical) =

- The Musical
- 2019 original cast recording logo
- Music: Anna Mariam Brown
- Lyrics: Anna Mariam Brown
- Basis: The Bible
- Premiere: 2023: Grandscape, The Colony, Texas

His Story: The Musical is a contemporary pop musical created by Anna Mariam Brown that portrays the biblical account of the life of Jesus Christ including Creation, his birth, ministry, crucifixion, and resurrection.

== Synopsis ==
=== Act I ===
In Was the Word, the musical opens with a remix of John 1— "In the beginning was the word—" followed by an overview of Genesis 1 (the creation of the earth) and the fall of man. Mary's then prays for the arrival of the messiah and Gabriel tells her that she will bear Jesus. Joseph, receiving the news of Mary's impregnation, fears her infidelity but is calmed by the appearance of an angel, and then promises to be a good father to Jesus to Mary. Arrive covers the nativity of Jesus and his coming of age. 40 Days and The Easy Way cover the temptation of Christ.

The rest of the first act covers his miracles and the gather of his disciples: Jesus finds Peter, who is convinced via the miraculous catch of fish; he turns water into wine as he finds and gathers the other eleven apostles; he heals Peter's mother-in-law; Jesus cleanses a leper; Matthew retells his call to discipleship; Jesus heals a man's daughter; finds Mary Magdalene (who is depicted as prostitute); walks on water, to which his disciples profess their belief and trust in him; and Jesus feeds the 5,000.

=== Act II ===
The second act covers the teachings of Jesus, his crucifixion, and resurrection. Jesus stops the stoning of an adulterous woman and tells her that he does not condemn her. In I Never Knew You, Jesus debates with the pharisees and answers their question regarding taxes.

After being proclaimed the messiah by a mass of people shouting "hosanna," the pharisees plan to kill Jesus; the pharisees and Satan convince Judas to betray Jesus. After the Last Supper, Jesus stays silent as he is put on trial, denied by Peter, crucified, and mourned by his followers including Mary. After Judas hangs himself, the rock in front of Jesus' tomb is found rolled away. Jesus then goes to speak with Mary Magdalene and Peter, as well as the rest of the disciples.

The followers of Christ then proclaim the truth of the resurrection and begin to spread the Christian faith, ending the musical with the cast saying "amen."

== Musical numbers ==
The following songs are featured on the concept album for His Story:

Act I:

- Was the Word
- Hey It's Me
- From the Moment
- Arrive
- My Name is Jesus
- 40 Days
- The Easy Way
- Do My Eyes Deceive Me?
- The Reason I Came
- Willing
- Matthew
- He Cares for You
- Miss Magdalene
- One Step at a Time
- We Trust
- The Greatest
- Compassion

Act II

- Condemned
- I Never Knew You
- Hosanna
- Who I Am
- The Last Supper
- What Am I Supposed to Say?
- Never Gonna Let Go
- Lost Cause
- Look at That
- See You in Eternity
- Do My Eyes Deceive Me? (Reprise)
- Arise
- It's Started

Additionally, the song "Let Me Be Broken," sung by Mary Magdalene, is featured in the production but not on the concept album.

== Cast and crew ==
Crew
Crew member	Job
Anna Miriam Brown	Creator; lyricist and composer
Bruce Lazarus	Producer
Jeff Calhoun	Director
Willie Robertson	Producer
Korie Robertson	Producer
Michael Chase Gosselin	General manager
Eamon Foley	Choreographer
Gigi Hausman	Assistant choreographer and dance captain
Rick Hip-Flores	Musical arranger
Pawel ‘Bzim’ Zarecki	Arranger
Jesse Fry	Music director
Tobin Ost	Scenic designer
Junghyun Georgia Lee	Costume designer
Sooner Routhier	Lighting designer
Daniel Lundberg	Sound designer
Caite Hevner	Projection designer
Eisenberg/Beans Casting	Casting

Cast
Actor	Role(s)
Max Kuenzer	Jesus
Jataria Heyward	Mother Mary
Logan Dolence	Joseph
Bryan Munar	Simon Peter
Mat Blasio	Nicodemus
Casey Lamont	Satan
Richard Chaz Gomez	Judas Iscariot
Lily Gast	Mary Magdalene
Courtney Blanc	Caiaphus / Phillip
Caleb Bermejo (Note: Also a member of the tribe)	Pontius Pilate
Camden Deal	Leper
Ja’Naye Flanagan	Bartholomew
Carlos Gutierrez	Gabriel
Lia Karagianopoulos	James
Abby Murphy	Thaddeus
Justin Taylor	Matthew
Gigi Hausman (Note: Also serves as the assistant choreographer and dance captain)	Tribe Swing
Mark Quach	Tribe Swing
Nicholas Haas	Principal Swing
Audrey Lee	Principal Swing

== Creation ==
Anna Miriam Brown began to create His Story on a Kenyan medical mission trip. The impetus to writing the musical came after listening to the Hamilton soundtrack (to which greatly inspired the musical) where she desired to replicate her new-found love of history that she gained from Hamilton with Christianity. She was inspired by the Bible— her father being Christian, but many of her other family members on her father's side being Jewish. Additionally, Anna was inspired by the earnestly-depicted brokenness shown in the works of Francine Rivers, particularly Mark of the Lion.

Anna, who had no prior interest in theater nor had composed or studied music, began writing songs for the musical at sixteen and finished writing the thirty songs within about a year. Through a family friend, Bruce Lazarus discovered the musical and helped to produce the musical.

Brown's motive for creating the musical was largely religious, viewing it as a form of ministry. However, her and her co-producers (including Bruce Lazarus who is Jewish) agreed that the show is primarily a piece of theater in order to appeal regardless of the viewer's faith. However, unlike other content starring Jesus (such as Jesus Christ Superstar or Godspell which use Christian narrative more as a metaphor), His Story, while still promoting secular themes such as love and redemption, is fundamentally a confirmation of the Christian faith.

His Story attempts to humanize the New Testament figures and features a diverse cast of Generation Z actors.

In 2019 on Palm Sunday, the concept album for His Story was released.

== Production ==
Anna was aided by producer Bruce Lazarus and director Jeff Calhoun heavily in the creation of the musical. She additional credits receiving much help from her sister, Rachel, who initially helped her learn the piano. The musical was written after 14 months and raised 7.5 million dollars.

Opposing the supposed secularism of Broadway spaces, Lazarus choose to perform the show at Grandscape in The Colony, Texas near Dallas where there was large populations of Christians. The theater is in a tent with 1300 seats that features a 360-degree stage with a rotating turntable on the outer ring and a pneumatic lift as well as laser projectors that allow for projecting panoramic scenes onto the tent. Above the stage, a large light-up crown of thorns is able to be lowered and raised. The length of the show was two hours with a 20-minute intermission.

Previews for His Story began on May 6, 2023 with the official opening on May 18, announcing an open-ended run.

=== Closing ===
On June 18, 2023, His Story announced its closing with their last show at 7:00 pm on that date. No reason was publicly provided for their closure.
