= His Story =

His Story may refer to:

- His Story (album), a 2005 album by MC Mong
- "His Story" (Scrubs), a 2003 episode of the television series Scrubs
- His Story (web series), an Indian Hindi-language drama web series
- His Story of Itihaas, a 2025 Indian Hindi-language film by Manpreet Singh
- "His Story", a song by TLC from Ooooooohhh... On the TLC Tip
- "His-Story", a song by Beenie Man from Maestro
- His Story: The Musical, a musical about the life of Jesus Christ by Anna Brown

== See also ==
- History (disambiguation)
- HIStory: Past, Present and Future, Book I, an album by Michael Jackson
  - "HIStory" (song), the title song
