= Drown in My Mind =

"Drown In My Mind"

Single by Story Untold

from the album Waves
- Released: November 8, 2017
- Recorded: 2017
- Genre: Pop punk, alternative, pop rock
- Length: 3:21
- Label: Hopeless Records
- Songwriter(s): Janick Thibault
- Producer(s): Derek Hoffman, Paul Marc Rousseau

"Drown In My Mind" is the second single from Story Untold's debut album Waves.

== Background ==
Lead vocalist Janick Thibault states, "Drown In My Mind is the song that was the easiest to write for me. It's just so personal to me and also felt like a huge relief. The past few years of my life have been hard for me on a personal level and back when I had my hard times, I wish I would've had a song like that to listen to that would've basically told me "it's ok to feel like that". Musically I think it sets the mood for the whole album. Our album that is called "Waves" is definitely more mature lyrically and musically than what we put out in the past. I think it's the perfect balance between catchy fun pop punk songs and more mature heartfelt songs. We hope you guys are gonna dig the songs as much as we do!"

== Track listing ==
- Digital download
1. "Drown In My Mind" – 3:00

== Personnel ==
- Janick Thibault – lead vocals, songwriting
- Jessy Bergy – lead guitar
- Jonathan Landry – drums
- Max Cloutier – rhythm guitar
- Aiden Von Rose – bass guitar
