= Geshur =

Place mentioned in the Hebrew Bible

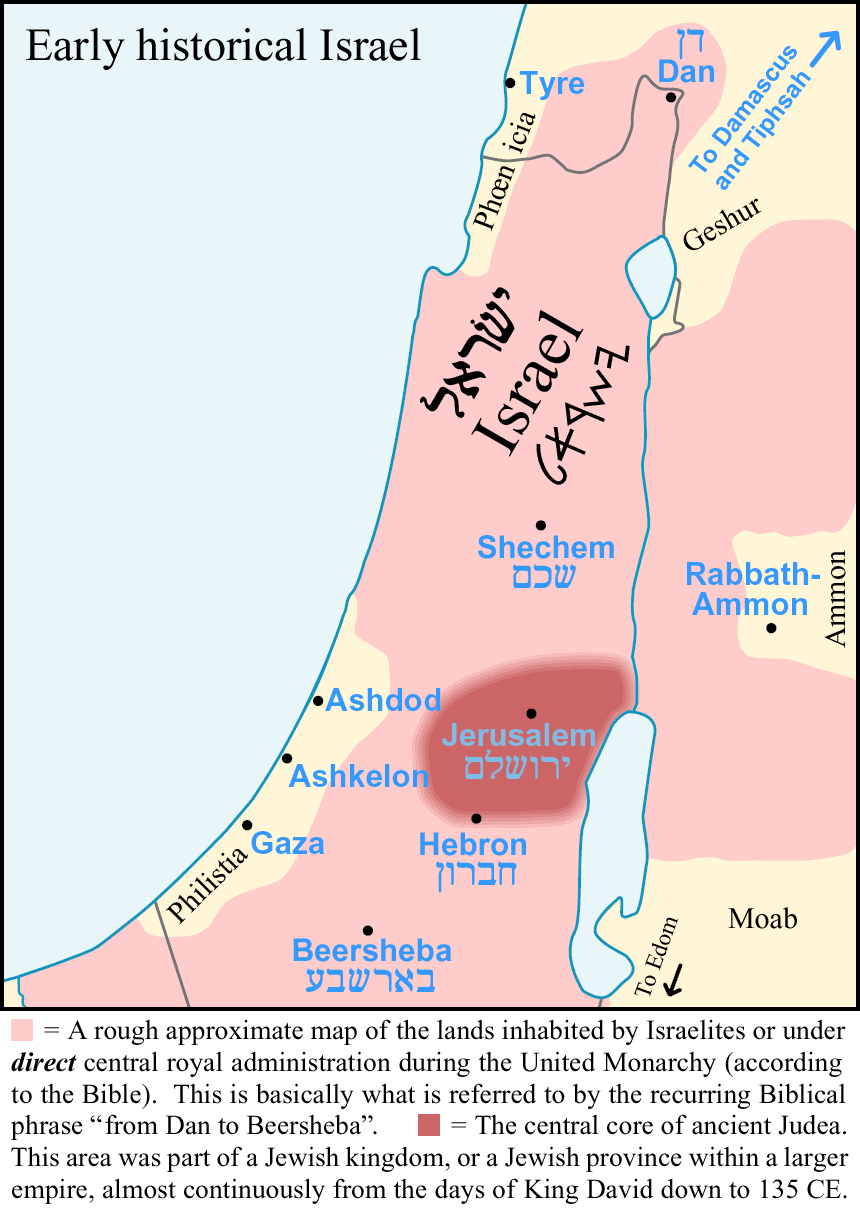
Location of biblical Geshur (top right area, east of the Sea of Galilee)

Geshur (Biblical Hebrew: גְּשׁוּר, romanized: Gəšūr) was a territory in the ancient Levant mentioned in the early books of the Hebrew Bible and possibly in several other ancient sources, located in the region of the modern-day Golan Heights. Some scholars suggest it was established as an independent city-state during the early Iron Age from the middle of the tenth century BCE, maintaining its autonomy for about a century until it was annexed in the third quarter of the eighth century by Tiglath-Pileser III, the king of Assyria.

== Etymology ==
The name of Geshur, preserved in Hebrew as גְּשׁוּר Gəšūr, likely derives from the Semitic root *g-ṯ-r “to be strong”. A sense “stronghold, fortress” suits the impressive city walls excavated at et-Tell (between six and eight meters width).

== Location ==
Geshur is identified with the area stretching along the eastern shore of the Sea of Galilee and reaching south to the Yarmuk River, in what is now called the Golan Heights. This location places it on one of the routes connecting the region of Bashan with the Phoenician coast. Tel Dover, located southeast of the Sea of Galilee on the Yarmuk River, may have been the kingdom's southern border. Surveys conducted within the Golan Heights have not discovered many settlements within the territory of Geshur.

== Historical sources ==
=== Hebrew Bible ===
The name "Geshur" is found primarily in biblical sources and has been taken to mean "stronghold or fortress". The Bible describes it as being near Bashan, adjoining the province of Argob (Deuteronomy 3:14) and the kingdom of Aram or Syria (2 Samuel 15:8; 1 Chronicles 2:23). According to the Bible, it was allotted to the half-tribe of Manasseh which settled east of the Jordan River, but its inhabitants, the Geshurites, could not be expelled (Joshua 13:13).

1 Samuel 27:8 reports that David undertook raids against the Geshurites while stationed in Ziklag in the kingdom of Gath. In the time of David's rule over Israel, Geshur was an independent Aramean kingdom, and David married Maachah, a daughter of Talmai, king of Geshur (2 Samuel 3:3, 1 Chronicles 3:2). Her son Absalom fled to his mother's native country after he murdered his half-brother, David's eldest son, Amnon. Absalom stayed there for three years before being rehabilitated by David (ib. 13:37, 15:8). By the 9th century BCE the kingdom of Geshur had disappeared from history.

=== Amarna letters ===
Two of the Late Bronze Age Amarna letters (EA 256 and EA 364), dating to the 14th century BC, identify 'the land of Garu', as a disputed territory in the Golan between the city states of Hazor and Ashtaroth. Some scholars believe that this 'Garu' is identical with the biblical Geshur, although this is contested by others who contend that it is based on a "hypothetical and disputed assumption".

=== Statue of Shalmaneser III ===
Some scholars believe the inscription on the broken statue of Shalmaneser III that describes cities captured by him may include the phrase "the Geshurite seized my feet. I received his tribute", although this is by no means certain.

== Archaeology ==
=== Capital at et-Tell ===
Archaeologists tend to agree that the capital of the kingdom was situated at et-Tell, a place also inhabited on a lesser scale during the first centuries BCE and CE and sometimes identified with the town of Bethsaida, mentioned in the New Testament. Most imposing archaeological finds, mainly the Stratum V city gate, date to the 8th century BCE. As of 2024, archaeologists have also found the northwestern chamber wall of the Geshurite city gate of Stratum VI, dating to the 11th-10th centuries BCE. The et-Tell site would easily have been the largest and strongest city to the east of the Jordan Valley during the Iron II era.

=== Tell Hadar ===
Tell Hadar is a small site located on the northeastern shore of the Sea of Galilee which archaeological surveys have revealed as containing architectural features distinct from those of ancient Israel. Some archaeologists have suggested the site may have been under the control of Geshur.

=== Tel Dover ===
Tel Dover is small Iron I-IIa settlement located southeast of Galilee near the Yarmuk River, which may have marked the southern border of the kingdom.

=== Haspin ===
In 2020, a dig supervised by the Israel Antiquities Authority uncovered a massive fortress dating to Iron Age I in the vicinity of Haspin. Artefacts from the site, believed to depict some sort of lunar deity, were found to greatly resemble similar objects found during excavation at et-Tell, which lead the head archeologists to conclude that the two sites were connected in some way. Others remain skeptical, as a concrete connection between the two sites has not been exhibited by any other evidence found during the excavation, at the time.

=== Regional overview ===
According to Sugimoto (2015), the Iron Age IB (mid-eleventh century BC) cities in this northeastern region of the Sea of Galilee likely reflect the activities of the Kingdom of Geshur.

Also, the later Iron Age IIA (tenth to mid-ninth centuries BC), and Iron Age IIB cities here are linked with the southern expansion of Aram Damascus. Sugimoto presented the results of the archaeological excavations at five key sites in this region: Tel Dover, Tel ‘En Gev, Tel Hadar, Tel Bethsaida, and Tel Kinrot. According to him, “The material culture of these cities, particularly the architecture, is ... more similar to that of the Aramaean and Neo-Hittite cities in northern Syria than to Canaanite cities in the southern Levant during both periods.”

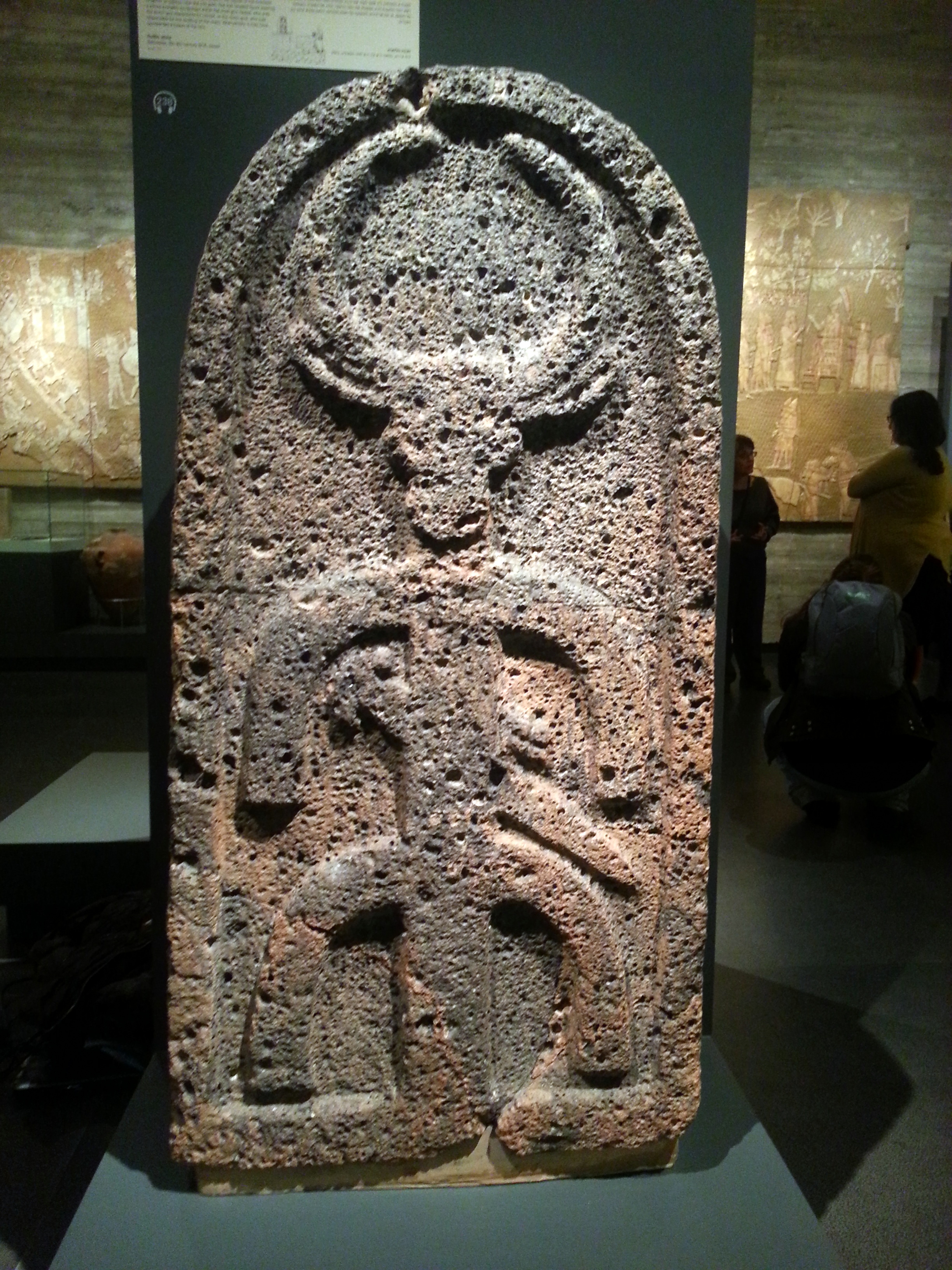
A stele from Bethsaida (et-Tell) depicting the Geshurite lunar deity, possibly Kašku. On display at the Israel Museum in Jerusalem.

== Religion ==
Excavations of et-Tell have revealed evidence of Geshurite religious practices including high places, decorated stelae, offering vessels, sacrificial animals and dedicatory inscriptions. This material culture reveals strong influences from neighbouring countries. Their religious worship appears to have centered around worship of the moon-god in the form of a bull which was common in southern Syria, whilst an Egyptian influence can be seen in their art and amulets. The bull stele from the city gate has alternatively been interpreted as either a symbol of the chief god Hadad, in charge of rainfall; the moon god, who brought about the swelling of the rivers; or a combination of the two. The influence of the Israelite religion to the south may be seen in dietary practices and the selection of sacrificial animals.

== See also ==
- Geshurites
- Talmai
- Absalom
