= Tell Hadar =

Archeological site of ancient city on the Sea of Galilee

- Sheikh Chader
- Sheikh Khadr, Tel Hadar
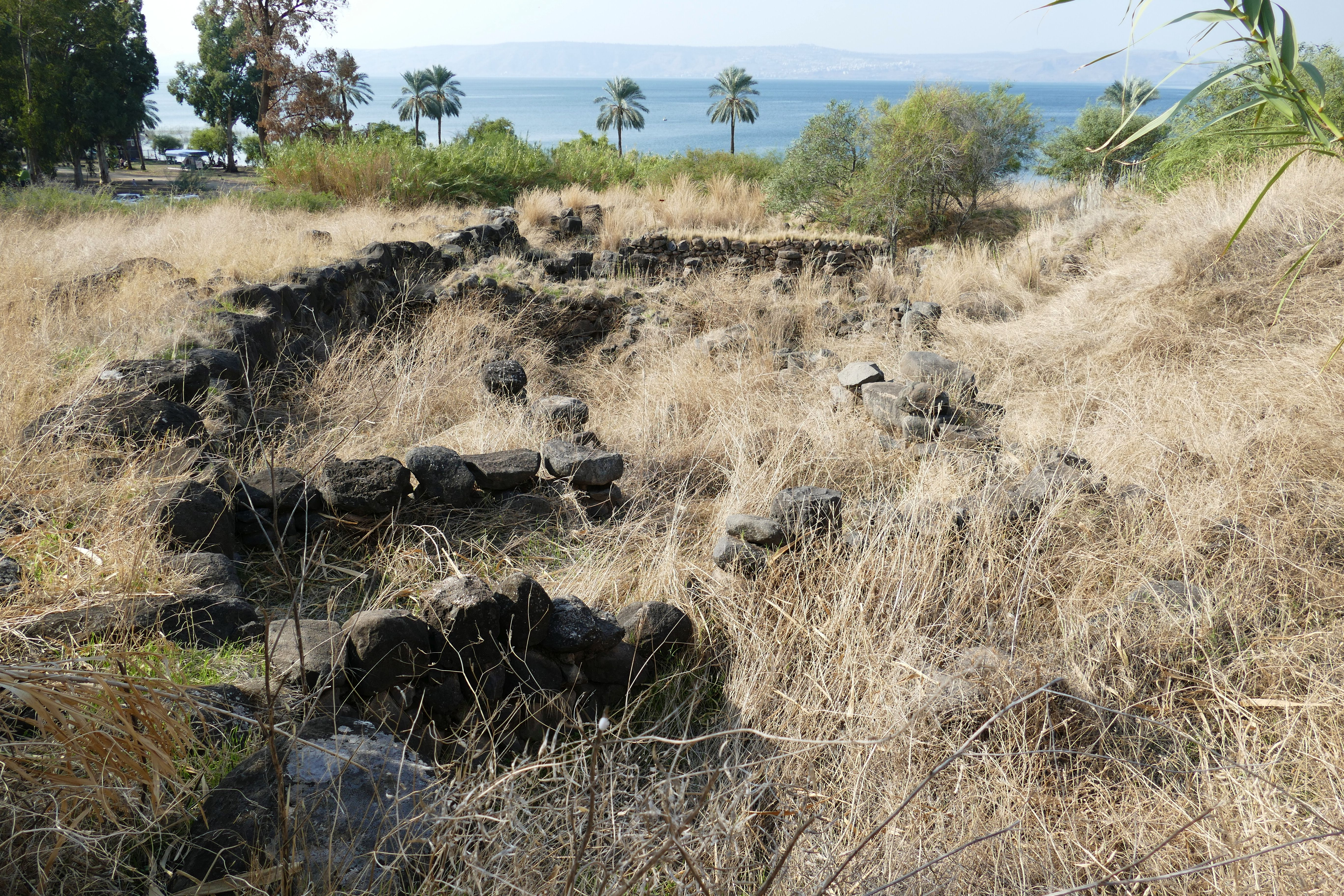
- ֿ

- Location within the Golan Heights Location within Syria
- 32°51′03″N 35°38′59″E
- Type: Settlement
- Region: NE shore of the Sea of Galilee, foot of Golan Heights

Site notes
- Archaeologists: Moshe Kochavi and Pirhiya Beck (1987–1998 digs)
- Public access: yes

Tell Hadar (Arabic: Sheikh Chader or Sheikh Khadr, Hebrew: תל הדר, romanized: Tel Hadar, lit. 'splendid hill'), is an archaeological site on the northeastern shore of the Sea of Galilee. It contains a settlement and a port.

== History ==
A wall, 70 metres (230 ft) across, is either of the Late Bronze Age I or Iron Age I. In between periods of no human presence (14th, 10th century BC), it had grown, under the control of an Aramean kingdom, possibly Geshur; a planned city, granaries, and possibly other storage facilities, were constructed. In the 9th century BC the wall was discarded. An excavation revealed two buildings sharing one wall.

== New Testament connection ==
Christians connect the site at Tell Hadar with Jesus' second miracle of the multiplication of loaves and fishes narrated in the Gospels of Matthew and Mark, known as the Feeding of the 4,000. A monument built of a raw local basalt boulder decorated with Christian inscriptions and images was erected near the archaeological site.

== Archaeology ==
Tell Hadar was excavated in 1987-1998 by Moshe Kochavi and Pirhiya Beck as part of the wider "Land of Geshur Regional Project." It is a relatively small and well-stratified mound of great importance for the research of cultural interactions between Syria and the southern Levant in the Bronze and Iron Ages. It also helped understanding the chronology of the Eastern Mediterranean in the early first millennium BCE.

The strata range from the end of the Middle Bronze Age to the early Iron Age IIB and their excavation yielded rich finds including architectural remains.

Shards of early Arabic pottery has been found at the site.

=== Iron Age I ===
Of crucial importance is a massive early-10th-century BCE (Iron Age I) destruction layer with excellently preserved remains, which included a rare Euboean Protogeometric vessel. The conclusively radiocarbon-dated absolute date of the event, along with the imported vessel, made of Tel Hadar's Stratum IV one of the chronological anchors of the Early Iron Age in the southern Levant and beyond it.

=== Iron Age II ===
Tell Hadar is considered to be a town of the Kingdom of Geshur, known from the Second Book of Samuel (2 Sam 3:3; 2 Sam 13:37–38; 2 Sam 14:32; 2 Sam 15:8). The Iron Age II strata contain remains of two well-planned domestic quarters, offering insights into the daily life of a small urban settlement belonging to the southernmost margins of the Syro-Anatolian culture.
