= Waves (Story Untold album) =

2018 album by Story Untold

Studio album by Story Untold
- Released: February 2, 2018
- Recorded: 2015–2017
- Genre: Pop rock, pop punk, alternative rock
- Label: Hopeless Records
- Producer: Derek Hoffman, Paul Marc Rousseau

Story Untold chronology
Story Untold (2016)	Waves (2018)

Singles from Waves
- 1. "Delete" Released: June 20, 2017; 2. "Drown In My Mind" Released: November 10, 2017; 3. "All The Same (Once A Liar, Always A Liar)" Released: January 9, 2018

Waves is the debut studio album by Canadian rock band Story Untold. The songs "Delete" and "Drown in My Mind" from the album were released as singles.

== Recording ==
The notes are confirmed by Janick Thibault.

In 2016, Eric Tobin of Hopeless Records got in touch with Paul Marc Rousseau of Silverstein and Janick Thibault of Story Untold so that way Thibault's songwriting could be improved. Since the contact, Rousseau ended up co-producing the album. According to Thibault, Rousseau sent Thibault demos of songs Rousseau was working on and In Or Out caught Thibault's attention and was the first song that was confirmed by the band that was going to be on the album. The 3ND is a song Thibault wrote in 2015 about an ex-girlfriend and his relationship and how Thibault was unhappy with relationship he was in while the ex thought it was okay. Thibault wanted The 3ND to sound like if Bullet for My Valentine and Sum 41 wrote a song together. Drown In My Mind is a song Thibault wrote about based on his alcoholism, low self-esteem, and tending to over think things. Delete is a song that was supposed to have been for 5 Seconds of Summer. Dreams That We Don't Share is a song about people not agreeing with certain situations as confirmed by Thibault.

According to the band on their Facebook, the band finished their first album on February 11, 2017, with the post "AND IT'S A WRAP! OUR 1ST ALBUM IS COMPLETE! We've worked really hard on this album and we hope you guys will love it as much as we do! BIG thanks to Derek Hoffman & Paul Marc Rousseau from Silverstein for their patience, ideas, help & all the hard work they've put into it! It was an amazing learning experience for us and we were blown away by their music knowledge and talent! That being said, thanks to all of you who are reading this right now and make sure you stay tuned 'cause things are about to get rad!"

== Promotion ==
The band first played their debut single, Delete, live on a Facebook live stream. On the album release, the band performed an album release show in Canada, acoustically. Since the acoustic performance, the band went on its first mini-headlining tour in Canada.

== Track listing ==
All songs written by Janick Thibault and Paul Marc Rousseau of Silverstein except California, written by Pierre Bouvier and Chuck Comeau of Simple Plan. A French version of Invisible appears as a separate single.

1. "In Or Out"
2. "The 3ND" (pronounced The End)
3. "Drown In My Mind"
4. "Delete"
5. "Dreams That We Don't Share"
6. "California"
7. "Matches in the Ocean"
8. "Invisible"
9. "Up 2 You"
10. "All the Same (Once a Liar, Always a Liar)"
11. "Chasing Feelings"

== Waves (Acoustic Sessions) ==
Waves (Acoustic Sessions)

EP by Story Untold
- Released: June 19, 2018
- Recorded: 2018
- Genre: Pop rock, pop punk, alternative rock
- Length: 9 minutes
- Label: Hopeless Records
- Producer: Derek Hoffman, Paul Marc Rousseau

Story Untold chronology
Waves (2016)	Waves (Acoustic Sessions) (2018)

Waves (Acoustic Sessions) is a three track acoustic EP by Canadian rock band Story Untold.

1. "Delete (Acoustic)"
2. "Drown in My Mind (Acoustic)"
3. "All the Same (Once A Liar, Always a Liar) (Acoustic)"

== Unreleased songs ==
1. "Not the One You Love" - Janick Thibault released the one minute song in its entirety on the band's Facebook page. The video was later re-uploaded to YouTube. Thibault confirmed it wouldn't be on the Waves album.
2. "Losing Everything You Have" - Janick Thibault released the song in its entirety on his YouTube channel. In the description of the video, Thibault confirmed, like Not the One You Love, it wouldn't be on the Waves album.

== Personnel ==
Story Untold

- Janick Thibault - Lead Vocals, songwriter
- Jessy Bergy - Lead Guitar
- Jonathan Landry - Drums
- Max Cloutier - Rhythm Guitar
- Aiden Von Rose - Bass guitar
- Derek Hoffman - Producer
- Paul Marc Rousseau - Producer, Co-songwriter
- Sam Guaiana - Mixer
- Dan Weston - Mastering Engineer
