= Hist =

Hist may refer to:

- History
- College Historical Society also known as The Hist
- Sør-Trøndelag University College (Norwegian: Høgskolen i Sør-Trøndelag, HiST)
- USS Hist (1895)
- hIST, an ancillary chunk in the PNG image file format
- Historic - See "History"
- hist, a common abbreviation or coding shortcut for histogram

== See also ==
- History (disambiguation)
