= Histrodamus =

Estonian website dedicated to history

Histrodamus is Estonian web portal, which aim is to introduce history through interactive means.

Portal's name is derived from Nostradamus, the famous French apothecary and seer, and term Historia. Its first goals are to introduce, popularize and explain Estonian history, but also culture and geography. The portal is available in Estonian, English and Russian languages.

Histrodamus was opened on January 22, 2010, six years after start of the project. It was funded mostly by private capital, but was also supported through Civil Society's Endowment (Kodanikuühiskonna Sihtkapital).
