= Story Untold (EP) =

EP by Story Untold
- Released: May 24, 2016
- Genres: Pop rock, pop punk, alternative rock
- Length: 22:49
- Label: Hopeless Records

Story Untold chronology
The Things We Say (2014)	Story Untold (2016)	Waves (2018)

Singles from Story Untold
- 1. "History" Released: May 24, 2016

Story Untold is the self-titled EP by pop punk band Story Untold. This is the first release by the band since being signed to a label, and the only album to feature Mehdi Zidani on drums since the band's signing.

== Track listing ==
All songs were written by Janick Thibault except " History", which was written by Janick Thibault, Pierre Bouvier, and Chuck Comeau.

All of the songs appear on the EP The Things We Say, with the exception of "History", "Give Up On Us", and "What If". These three appear on a rare EP the band released under the name Amasic, called Endless Possibilities.

1. "Everything is OK"
2. "You're A Freak"
3. "History"
4. "Give Up On Us"
5. "Another Night"
6. "If I Had One Dollar"
7. "What If"

== Personnel ==
Story Untold

- Janick Thibault - lead vocals, songwriting, rhythm guitar
- Simon LePage - bass guitar
