= Hitstory (disambiguation) =

Hitstory is a 2005 compilation album by Elvis Presley.

Hitstory may also refer to:

- HITstory, a 2012 mixtape by Hit-Boy
- Hitstory, a 2015 album by Gianna Nannini

== See also ==
- History (disambiguation)
