= Histories =

Histories or, in Latin, Historiae may refer to:

- the plural of history
- Histories (Herodotus), by Herodotus
- The Histories, by Timaeus
- The Histories (Polybius), by Polybius
- Histories by Gaius Sallustius Crispus (Sallust), of which only fragments survive
- Histories (Tacitus), by Tacitus
- Shakespeare's histories which define the theatrical genre History (theatrical genre)

Histories may also refer to:

- History of novels, an early term for the then emerging novel
- "Histories" (House), 10th episode in season 1 of House TV series
- Horrible Histories, a series of children's books written by Terry Deary
- Historians, those who write down an historical non-fiction
- Histories (journal), a journal published by MDPI.

== See also ==
- Historié, a Japanese manga series by Hitoshi Iwaaki
- Historias, 1994 album by Ricardo Arjona
- Herstory, feminism
- Histoire (disambiguation)
- Historia (disambiguation)
- History (disambiguation)
