= Histoire =

Histoire (French for 'story' or 'history') may refer to:

- Histoire TV, a French television channel
- Historia (TV channel), or Canal Histoire, a Canadian television channel
- L'Histoire, a French magazine
- Histoire (novel), a 1967 novel by Claude Simon

== See also ==
- Historié, a Japanese manga series by Hitoshi Iwaaki
- History (disambiguation)
- Historia (disambiguation)
- Histories (disambiguation)
