= History (Story Untold song) =

Single by Story Untold

from the album Endless Possibilities and Story Untold
- Released: 2016
- Recorded: 2016
- Genre: Pop punk, alternative, pop rock
- Length: 3:21
- Label: Hopeless Records
- Songwriter(s): Janick Thibault, Pierre Bouvier, and Chuck Comeau
- Producer(s): Story Untold

"History" is the debut single from Canadian band Story Untold. The members of Story Untold are from Quebec, Canada, which is also home to Simple Plan. Simple Plan has known the five-piece for a while, and the French Canadians teamed up to write Story Untold's newest single "History". The song is about how the band is going to make it big, even if it seems like a crazy idea: "You can call me crazy/But when I close my eyes/I can see it clearly/I can see the shining lights." The song was co-penned with Simple Plan's vocalist Pierre Bouvier and drummer Chuck Comeau. The song is just one of seven songs on the band's self-titled EP. History also has a music video where the band is a part of an underground fight club. It features each boy taking on a different fighter, and it subtly introduces each band member for those who have never heard of Story Untold before. An acoustic version of the song does appear on YouTube but is not featured on the Story Untold EP.

== Track listing ==
- Digital download
1. "History" – 3:21

== Personnel ==
Story Untold

- Janick Thibault - lead vocals, songwriting
- Jessy Bergy - Lead guitar
- Mehdi Zidani - Drums
- Max Cloutier - Rhythm guitar
- Aiden Von Rose - Bass guitar
