= Historia =

Historia may refer to:

- Historia, the local version of the History channel in Spain and Portugal
- Historia (TV channel), a Canadian French language specialty channel
- Historia (newspaper), a French monthly newspaper devoted to History topics
- Historia (video), a compilation video released by Def Leppard
- Historia (Antiquity journal), a peer-reviewed history journal specialised in Greek and Roman Antiquity
- Historia (history of the Americas journal), a peer-reviewed history journal dealing with the history of the Americas
- the Latin word for historiography
- Historia (drama), an unfinished drama of Polish writer Witold Gombrowicz, compiled from the author's notes by Konstanty Jeleński
- Historia Reiss, a fictional character in Japanese manga and anime series Attack on Titan
- Historia (Romanian magazine), history magazine owned by Adevărul

== See also ==
- Historias, by Ricardo Arona
- Herstory, feminism
- History (disambiguation)
- Histories (disambiguation)
- Histoire (disambiguation)
