= Delete (Story Untold song) =

Single by Story Untold

from the album Waves
- Released: June 20, 2017
- Recorded: 2017
- Genre: Pop punk, alternative, pop rock
- Length: 3:21
- Label: Hopeless Records
- Songwriter(s): Janick Thibault
- Producer(s): Derek Hoffman, Paul Marc Rousseau

"Delete" is the single from Story Untold's debut album as Story Untold rather than Amasic.

Lead vocalist Janick Thibault stated, "Delete is a song that means a lot to me. It's about not wanting to let go of a relationship. Every time you try to do it, you're reminded of the good times. It's like you're stuck in the past but at the same time you know that things will never be the same again. I think many of us can relate to this song because it's always hard to convince yourself that some things are meant to be let go."

The song was first played live during a Facebook live stream.

An acoustic version of the song was released by Hopeless Records.

Thibault confirmed in a track-by-track review of the album that the song was originally intended for the band 5 Seconds of Summer.

== Personnel ==
- Janick Thibault – lead vocals, songwriting
- Jessy Bergy – lead guitar
- Jonathan Landry – drums
- Max Cloutier – rhythm guitar
- Aiden Von Rose – bass guitar
