= Bruce Lazarus =

American lawyer and theatre producer

Bruce Lazarus (born in New York City) is an entertainment attorney and theatrical producer notable for his work on Broadway and off-Broadway.

== Education ==
Bruce Lazarus attended Southwestern University School of Law, in Los Angeles, California where he received his Juris Doctor degree in 1986. He received his bachelor's degree from the University of Miami, in Coral Gables, Florida where he majored in Theatre Arts.

== Career ==
Bruce Lazarus served as Executive Director of Samuel French Inc. from October 2012 to 2019 in New York, Los Angeles, and London.

=== Theatre ===
Lazarus received a 2003 Tony Award for Best Play nomination for the Broadway production of Say Goodnight Gracie by Rupert Holmes which starred Frank Gorshin and won the 2004 National Broadway Theatre Award for the national tour. His other Broadway producing credits include The Gathering by Arje Shaw which starred Hal Linden.

Lazarus also produced several off-Broadway productions including Shakespeare's Romeo and Juliet adapted by Joe Calarco for which he won the 1998 Lucile Lortel Award for Outstanding Production; Only Kidding by Jim Geoghan for which he won the 1989 Drama Desk Award Outstanding New Play nomination and for which two of its stars Paul Provenza and Howard Speigel won the 1989 Theatre World Awards.

His producing partners include Frederic B. Vogel, Roger Gindi, Dana Matthow, Allan Sandler, Steve Leber, David Krebs, Patrick Hogan, William Franzblau, Martha R. Gasparian, Lawrence S. Toppall, Martin Markinson, and Elsa Daspin Haft.

Directors he has collaborated with include: Larry Arrick, John Tillinger, Jeremy Dobrish, Genarro Montanino, Rebecca Taylor, and Joe Calarco.

As a theatrical attorney, Lazarus has represented over 20 Broadway and off-Broadway shows including: Blueman Group:Tubes, The Lion King, Aida and Beauty and the Beast in his capacity as Director of Business and Legal Affairs for Walt Disney Theatrical Productions.

He has taught the legal aspects of producing commercial theatre at the Commercial Theatre Institute in New York, at Carnegie Mellon University in Pittsburgh, Pennsylvania and at the UCLA School of Continuing Education.

== Talent Manager and Coach ==
Bruce Lazarus began his entertainment business career as a talent agent. He later became the personal manager for Ray Liotta, David Caruso, Troy Beyer, Philip Baker Hall and Marian Mercer.
