= Prehistory (disambiguation) =

Prehistory is the time before recorded human history.

Prehistory or Prehistoric may also refer to:

- Prehistory (album), Circle X album
- Prehistory and Prehistory II, 2011 EPs by Totally Enormous Extinct Dinosaurs
- Prehistoric (TV series), program broadcast on the Discovery Channel
