= Her Story =

Her story may refer to:

- Her Story (composition), a 2022 oratorio by Julia Wolfe
- Her Story (1920 film), a 1920 British silent film
- Her Story (2024 film), a 2024 Chinese comedy drama film
- "Her Story (Scrubs episode)", an episode of the TV series Scrubs (2004)
  - "Her Story II", an episode of the TV series Scrubs
- Her Story: Scenes from a Lifetime, a 2005 compilation album by Wynonna Judd
- Her Story (video game), a 2015 interactive movie video game
- Her Story (web series), a 2016 web series about transgender women

== See also ==
- Herstory, a neologism
- Herstory (film), a 2018 South Korean film
- Her Stories, a 1995 book by Virginia Hamilton
