= Tel Dover =

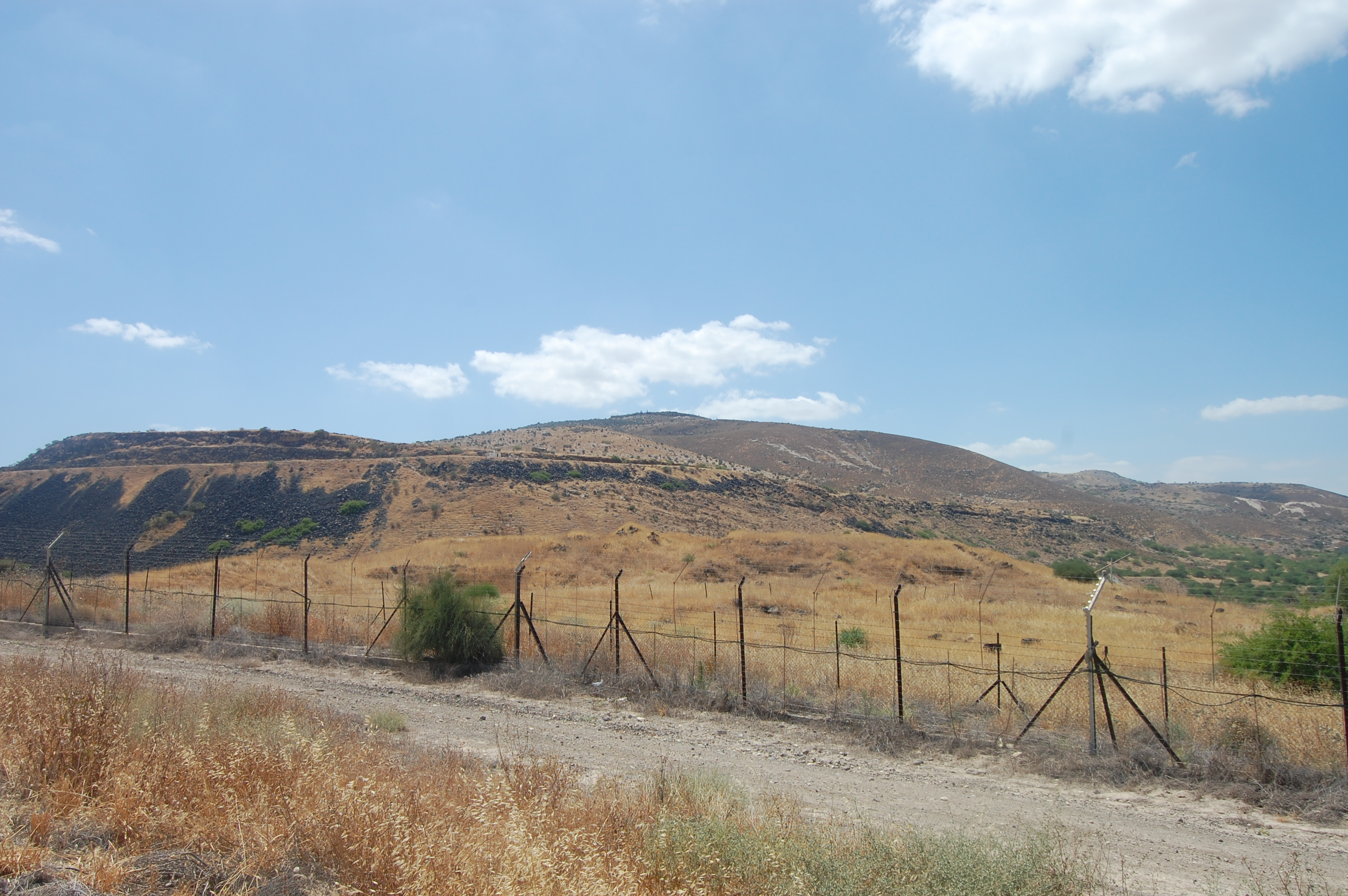
Tel Dover, 2021

Tel Dover (Hebrew name) or Khirbet ed-Duweir (Arabic name) is an archaeological site and Iron I-IIa settlement located southeast of the Galilee, on the northern bank of the Yarmuk River near (northeast of) modern-day Kibbutz Sha'ar Hagolan.

Tel Dover was surveyed on several occasions since the 12th century, but a licensed excavation was conducted only between July and September 1997 by the Israel Antiquities Authority, in preparation for the construction of a dam as part of the Israel–Jordan peace treaty. The excavation was directed by E. On.

== History and archaeology ==
The settlement of Tel Dover spanned from the Neolithic (10,000 BCE-2,000 BCE) to the Mamluk period (1250-1517).

=== Neolitihic ===
Remains from the Neolithic era include a pit with a rounded stone wall, pottery with black and red edges, engraved and stamped decorations, and flint tools.

=== Byzantine period ===
During the Byzantine period (late 4th century to early 7th century CE), Tel Dover fell within the province of Palaestina Prima. Evidence from that time also show a major earthquake that lead to the town's abandonment, which is often correlated to the 363 Galilee earthquake.

In the northern part of the settlement, archaeologists found a collection of broken church furniture imported from Cyprus, suggesting the presence of a Christian community.

=== Early Muslim to Mamluk period ===
In the 8th-15th centuries, during the Early Muslim, Crusader/Ayyubid and Mamluk periods, the area of Tel Dover was densely occupied. Tombs from those periods were found, as well as architectural remains.
