= Story Untold =

Canadian pop-punk band

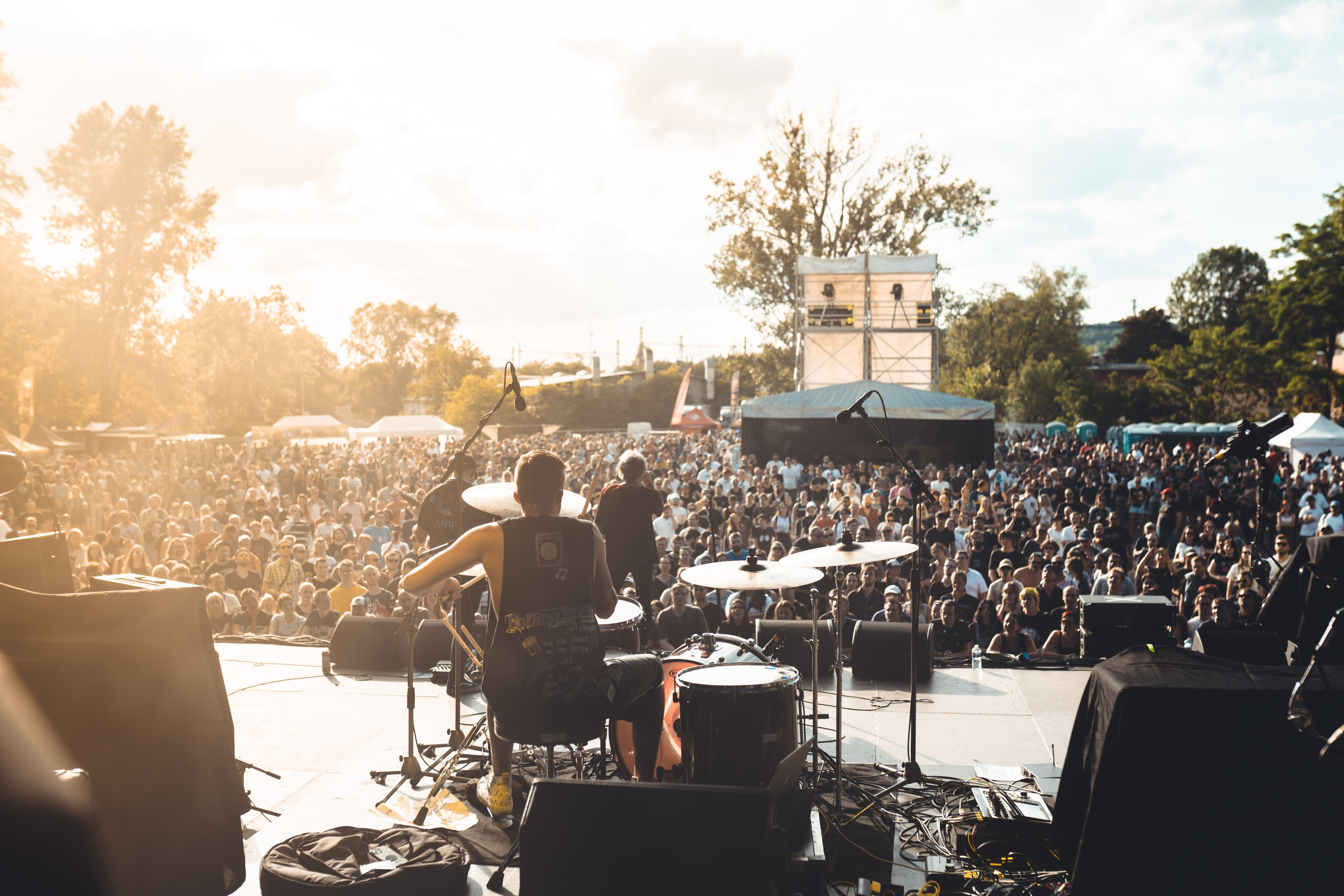
- Story Untold live at Prague Summer Festival on June 12, 2022, opening for The Offspring.

Background information
- Also known as: Amasic (2009–2016)
- Origin: Laval, Québec, Canada
- Genre: Pop punk
- Years active: 2009–present
- Labels: Independent, Hopeless Records
- Members: Janick Thibault; Jonathan Landry
- Past members: Matt McCormack; Mehdi Zidani; Jessy Bergy; Max Cloutier; Simon Lepage; Diego Stanger
- Website: storyuntoldband.com

Story Untold (formerly known as Amasic) is a Canadian pop-punk band based in Laval, Quebec. Founded in 2012, the band signed with Hopeless Records in May 2016. Shortly after signing, they recorded their self-titled EP, then went on tour with Simple Plan and Hit the Lights. Story Untold's current line-up included vocalist and main songwriter Janick Thibault and drummer Jonathan Landry. In December 2019, the band left Hopeless Records and now remain as an independent group.

== History ==
=== Origins ===
In late 2007, Janick Thibault started posting rock covers of popular songs on YouTube. By 2008, he began posting original songs under the name Amasic. Thibault operated as a solo act until 2012, when he began adding additional band members. The fleshed out Amasic included Thibault as singer and rhythm guitarist, Matt McCormack as bassist and co-vocalist, Jessy Bergy as lead guitarist, and Mehdi Zidani as drummer. The group was initially promoted as a full band through their music videos posted on the BryanStars YouTube channel. The four were influenced heavily by punk rock and pop punk bands such as Blink-182, Simple Plan, and Green Day. In 2016 they signed to Hopeless Records and started touring under a new name, Story Untold.

McCormack left the band by 2016 to focus on music school, and the band soon hired two new band members. Guitarist, Max Roll took over as rhythm guitarist, so Thibault could focus more on singing, then bassist Simon Lepage took over the vacancy McCormack left behind.

=== Hopeless Records signing, Waves, and Vans Warped Tour 2018 (2016–2018) ===
In 2016, the band signed to independent record label, Hopeless Records, and released a self-titled EP. After signing, they toured with Simple Plan and Hit the Lights. After the tour, the band announced on their Facebook page that they were releasing a new album. According to the band on their Facebook, the band finished their first album on February 11, 2017, with the following: post

AND IT'S A WRAP! OUR 1ST ALBUM IS COMPLETE! We've worked really hard on this album and we hope you guys will love it as much as we do! BIG thanks to Derek Hoffman & Paul Marc Rousseau from Silverstein for their patience, ideas, help & all the hard work they've put into it! It was an amazing learning experience for us and we were blown away by their music knowledge and talent! That being said, thanks to all of you who are reading this right now and make sure you stay tuned 'cause things are about to get rad!

Later, drummer Mehdi Zidani was replaced by drummer Jonathan Landry, and the song "Delete" was released as the first single from the album. In May 2018, it was announced that the band was performing on Vans Warped Tour for the final cross country tour and that Max Cloutier had left the band.

During 2018, the band also released a French version of their song "Invisible" and an acoustic EP featuring songs from Waves.

=== Leaving Hopeless Records and beginning of independent release (2019–2020) ===
On December 6, 2019, the band released their new single "Mental Breakdown". The single saw the band stepping away from the pop punk sound featured in their self-titled EP and Waves full-length, and moving toward a more rock-heavy sound. Along with releasing the single, the band revealed their independence from Hopeless Records with the following announcement on their Facebook page:

"We think at this point most of you guys have noticed that we no longer have a record label. We're 100% independent, which is scary but also very exciting. We now have total control and freedom over what we wanna do... At the end of the day we're just trying to stay true to ourselves with/without a label...we just wanna create what feels right for us."

On January 31, 2020, the band released a new single "i luv that u hate me" featuring Kellin Quinn of Sleeping with Sirens. There is also a version of this song without the latter.

March 12, 2020, was the date of the release of "CHAINSMOKE".

"locked down" was released, on April 17, 2020.

A new version of "i luv that u hate me" (labeled "Reimagined") is released on June 12, 2020.

=== Becoming a two-persons band and no future (2020–2021) ===
Diego Stanger left the band on July 12, 2020, and Simon Lepage did the same the next day.

Now a duo, Story Untold released "fake for you" on August 14, 2020, "this song wasn't good enough for the album" on October 23, 2020 (which comes from the unreleased EP Endless Possibilities under the title "A Song For Her") and "from the outside i seem just fine" on November 27, 2020.

The band releases the song "nxt my father anymxre" on February 21, 2021, before announcing a new EP. Entitled nx future, this EP is led by the single "BMTH shxw" and released on March 26, 2021. A videoclip for "gxne by 27" from the same EP is released on April 27, 2021.

Two more songs are published in 2021 : "gxxgle maps" on June 18 and "I'M A-OK" (ft.7evin7ins) on November 5.

=== Challenge of releasing singles (2022) ===
Story Untold then announces their intention of releasing a new song every month in 2022 : "Attention Junkie" (ft. Dallas) on January 7, "Don't Fall In Love With Me" on February 11, "All Time Low" on March 11, "This Song Goes Out To You" on April 15, "Toxic Love" on May 13, no single in June, "Die With You On My Mind" on July 8, "Lost And Found" on August 19, "Pretty Girl" on September 30, no single in October and November and eventually "It's Messed Up How I Want You To Stay" on December 9.

=== new singles (2023–present) ===
The first single of 2023 is "Games With Shitty Rules", released on March 3. On June 9, "Remedy" is published : this single initiates a change of style with sound inspired by a mix of Linkin Park, Bring Me the Horizon and Evanescence. After faking their disbandment, the band releases "3:33" on August 18. A cover of "Every Breath You Take" by The Police in the style of Punk goes pop is published on October 13. The last song released is "Rehab" on November 17.

== Band members ==
Current

- Janick Thibault - vocals, acoustic guitar (2010–present) rhythm guitar (2009–2016, 2020-present)
- Jonathan Landry - drums (2017–present)

Former

- Jessy Bergy - lead guitar (2013–2019)
- Matt McCormack - bass, backing vocals (2012–2016)
- Mehdi Zidani - drums (2013–2017)
- Max Roll Cloutier - rhythm guitar, backing vocals (2016–2018)
- Simon Lepage - bass (2016–2020)
- Diego Stanger - rhythm guitar, backing vocals, keyboard (2018–2020)

== Discography ==
Studio albums

- Waves (2018)
- Generation 404 (2026)

EPs

- Story Untold (EP) (2016)
- Waves (Acoustic Sessions) (2018)
- No Future (EP) (2021)
