= Bethsaida =

Ancient Jewish settlement in the Golan Heights

Bethsaida (/bɛθˈseɪ.ɪdə/ beth-SAY-id-ə; from Koine Greek: Βηθσαϊδά, romanized: Bēthsaïdá; from Aramaic and Hebrew: בֵּית צַידָה, romanized: Bēṯ Ṣayḏā, lit. 'House of Fishing, or House of the Hunt', from the Hebrew root צ-י-ד; Arabic: بيت صيدا, romanized: Bayt Ṣaydā), also known as Julias or Julia (Ancient Greek: Ἰουλία, romanized: Ioulía), is a place mentioned in the New Testament. Julias lay in an administrative district known as Gaulonitis, now the Golan Heights.

Historians have suggested that the name is also referenced in rabbinic literature under the epithet Ṣayḏān (Hebrew: צַידָן). (Note: Historical geographer Samuel Klein opines that this place is to be recognised in the name Ṣaidan of Mishnah Gittin 7:5, Mishnah Avodah Zarah 3:7, Mishnah Gittin 4:7 (BT Gittin 46a), and Jerusalem Talmud (Sheḳalim 6:2). Klein wrote: "`Bethsaida = Julias at the confluence of the Jordan in the lake, [a place] not proven in Jewish tradition.` (Sch.) – However, I suspect that Bethsaida occurs in the Talmudic literature called Ṣaidan. ...The fact that the name Ṣaidan (ציידן) is not preceded by the word 'Beth' (בית) presents no difficulty in explaining the two names as being identical, since similar things are more common among Galilean names (e.g. Maon and Meron; Beth-Maon and Beth-Meron)" (Klein 1915:167–168). Herbert Danby, in his English translation of the Mishnah, erroneously transliterated the proper name צידן in all places as "Sidon" in Phoenicia, even though Sidon is almost always spelt in Hebrew as צִידוֹן, with a waw (ו). Marcus Jastrow also follows the general view that צידן is none other than Sidon of Phoenicia. Conversely, the Yemenite Babylonian Talmud, punctuated by Yosef Amir, has distinguished between the two sites, assigning the vowels pataḥ and qamaṣ for Ṣaidan = צַידָן, but ḥiraq and ḥolam for the Phoenician city Sidon = צִידוֹן. German theologian H.W. Kuhn, citing archaeologist Richard A. Freund (Freund 1995:267–311), further supports this view, and writes: "The Rabbinic literature in which Bethsaida appears, as already mentioned, is never called 'Julias', but rather speaks of '(Beth-)saida' (ציידן = Ṣaidan, etc.; [whereas] בית ציידן = Beth ṣaidan, or anything similar, also does not appear in rabbinic texts), so like the canonical gospels, it uses this name for the village. From these texts I refer merely to one [village] presumably" (Kuhn 2015:153). An anecdote has been passed down in the Midrash Rabba (Kohelet Rabba 2:11), where Hadrian asked Rabbi Yehoshua b. Hananiah about the preeminence of the Land of Israel over other lands, particularly where the Scripture (Deuteronomy 8:9) imputes of the country that it is "a land wherein you shall eat bread without scarceness, [and] you shall not lack any thing therein." When asked whether or not the country could produce for him three things: peppercorns, pheasants (phasianum) and silk, the rabbi brought for him peppercorns from Nasḥana, pheasants from Ṣaidan and silk from Gush Halav, – meaning, the place was reckoned as in the Land of Israel proper.) (Note: In the Jerusalem Talmud (Sheḳalim 6:2), after mentioning Lake Hulah and the Sea of Galilee, Saidan is then mentioned as a place where there was an abundance of different kinds of fish, as alluded to in Ezekiel 47:8–10, and where it was said of a certain river that "their fish shall be after their kinds." Klein has speculated that this Saidan refers to Bethsaida along the Jordan River (Klein 1915:167–168).)

The location of ancient Bethsaida or Julias has not been positively identified by modern researchers, of the three original candidates el-Araj being lately favoured due to the most recent discoveries, displacing et-Tell as the front-runner.

== New Testament ==
According to John 1:44, Bethsaida was the hometown of the apostles Peter, Andrew, and Philip. Jörg Frey finds this attribution credible. In Mark 8:22–26, Jesus restored a blind man's sight at a place just outside the ancient village of Bethsaida. In the Gospel of Luke, Jesus miraculously fed a multitude of people near Bethsaida.

== History ==
Pliny the Elder, in his Natural History (77–79 CE), places Bethsaida on the eastern side of the Sea of Galilee. The Jewish historian Josephus says Bethsaida, at that time called Julia, was situated 120 stadia from the lake of Semechonitis, which is now the much drier Hula Valley not far from the Jordan River as it passes into the middle of the Sea of Galilee.

The much later De situ terrae sanctae, a 6th-century Christian itinerarium, describes Bethsaida's location in relation to Capernaum, saying that it was 6 mi (9.7 km) distant from Capernaum. The distance between Bethsaida and Paneas is said to have been 50 mi (80 km).

== Identification: candidates ==
Although Bethsaida is believed to be located on the northern shore of the Sea of Galilee, within the Bethsaida Valley, there is disagreement among scholars as to precisely where. Since the nineteenth century, three places have been considered as the possible location of biblical Betsaida:

- El-Araj, an archaeological site at the place where the upper Jordan River flows into the Sea of Galilee is proposed by a second group, led by Mordechai Aviam, under the auspices of the center for Holy Land Studies (CHLS). It is also known as Beit HaBek, "House of the Bey", due to the ruins of an old mansion at the site.
- Et-Tell, an archaeological site on the east bank of the Jordan River, is promoted by the Bethsaida Excavations Project, led by Rami Arav.
- El-Mesydiah or el-Mes‛adīyeh, an archaeological site and former Bedouin winter village about 2 mi (3.2 km) from the mouth of the River Jordan on the Jordanian side, is the third candidate, but the least likely one.

== El-Araj ==
el-Araj
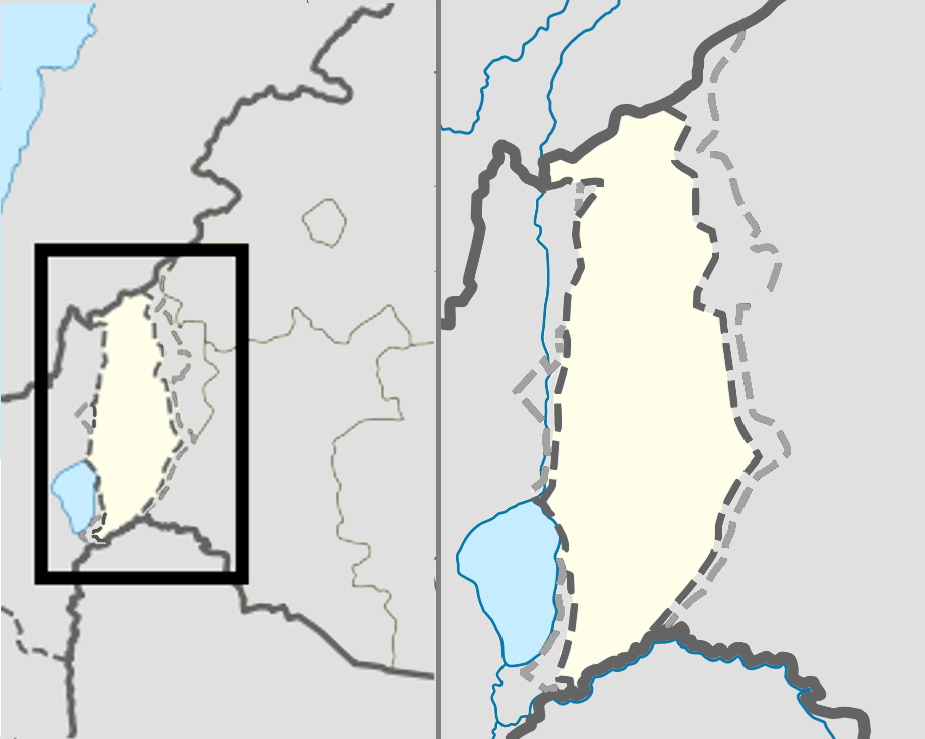
- Location within the Golan Heights
- 32°53′36″N 35°37′09″E
- Region: Lower Gaulanitis

According to Josephus, around the year 30/31 CE (or 32/33 CE) Philip raised the village of Bethsaida in Lower Gaulanitis to the rank of a polis and renamed it "Julias", in honor of Livia, also called Julia Augusta, the wife of Augustus. It lay near the place where the Jordan river enters the Sea of Galilee.

Julias/Bethsaida was a city east of the Jordan River, in a "desert place" (that is, uncultivated ground used for grazing), if this is the location to which Jesus retired by boat with his disciples to rest a while (see Mark 6:31 and Luke 9:10). The multitude following on foot along the northern shore of the lake would cross the Jordan by the ford at its mouth, which is used by foot travelers to this day. The "desert" of the narrative is just the barrīyeh of the Arabs, where the animals are driven out for pasture. The "green grass" of Mark 6:39, and the "much grass" of John 6:10, point to some place in the plain of el-Baṭeiḥah, on the rich soil of which the grass is green and plentiful, compared to the scanty herbage on the higher slopes.

In 2017, archaeologists announced the discovery of a Roman bathhouse at el-Araj, which is taken as proof that the site was a polis in the Roman Empire period. The bathhouse was located in a layer below the Byzantine layer, with an intervening layer of mud and clay that indicated a break in occupation between 250 and 350 CE. They also found what might be the remains of a Byzantine church building, matching the description of a traveller in 750 CE. On account of these discoveries, the archaeologists believe that el-Araj is now the most likely candidate for the location of Bethsaida.

In 2019, what some describe as the Church of Apostles was unearthed by the el-Araj excavations team during the fourth season at the site of Bethsaida-Julias / Beithabbak (el-Araj), on the north shore of Sea of Galilee near where the Jordan river enters the lake. The excavation was carried out by Prof. Mordechai Aviam of Kinneret College and Prof. R. Steven Notley of Nyack College. This Byzantine period church is believed by some to have been built over the house of the apostle brothers, Peter and Andrew. Only the southern rooms of the church were excavated. A well-protected ornamental mosaic floor, gilded glass tesserae, and a marble chancel decorated with a wreath have been found in some of the excavated rooms. According to Professor Notley:

We have a Roman village, in the village we have pottery, coins, also stone vessels, which are typical of first-century Jewish life, so now we strengthen our suggestion and identification that el-Araj is a much better candidate for Bethsaida than et-Tell.

In 2022, the archaeological team uncovered a large mosaic that is over 1500 years old containing an inscription. This invokes St. Peter as "the chief and commander of the heavenly apostles". and mentions a donor named "Constantine, a servant of Christ". These terminologies are consistent with Byzantine usage. Because of this, Notley said that this "strengthen[s] our argument that [it] should be considered the leading candidate for first century Bethsaida."

In August 2025, in the wake of a wildfire along the northern shore of the Kinneret, small mounds across the el-Araj archaeology site are being excavated as "mini-tells."

== Et-Tell ==
et-Tell
- בית צידה (Hebrew) بيت صيدا (Arabic)
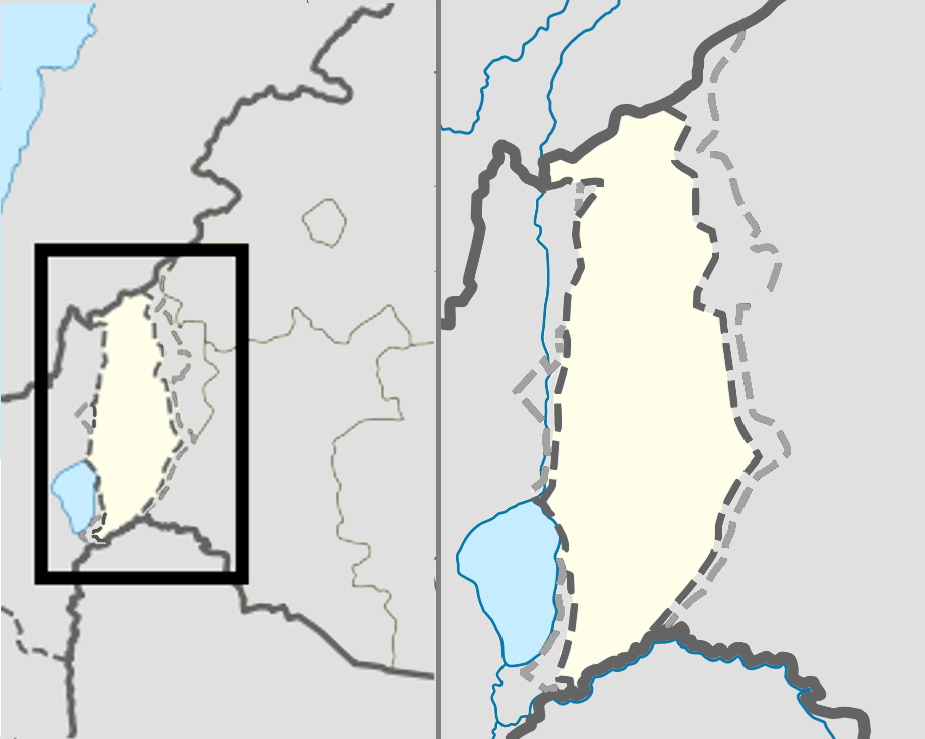
- Location within the Golan Heights
- 32°54′37″N 35°37′50″E
- Location: Golan Heights

History
- Built: 11th century BCE (Iron Age city) * 3rd century BCE (Hellenistic city)
- Abandoned: 734–732 BCE (Asdyrian destruction)

Archaeologists tend to agree that the capital of the kingdom of Geshur was situated at et-Tell, a place also inhabited on a lesser scale during the first centuries BCE and CE and sometimes identified with the town of Bethsaida of New Testament fame.

The first excavations of the site were conducted in 1987–1989 by the Golan Research Institute. In 2008–2010, and in 2014, archaeological excavations of the site were conducted by Rami Arav on behalf of the University of Nebraska of Omaha, Nebraska. According to Arav, the ruin of et-Tell is said to be Bethsaida, a ruined site on the east side of the Jordan on rising ground, 2 km (1.2 mi) from the sea. However, this distance poses a problem, as a fishing village situated far from the shore of the Sea of Galilee would be problematic. In an attempt to rectify the problem, the following hypotheses have been devised:

1. Tectonic rift activity has uplifted et-Tell; the site is located at the West Asian end of the active and massive Great Rift Valley of Africa.
2. The water level has dropped due to increased population usage and land irrigation. In fact, the excavation of Magdala's harbour has proven that the ancient water level was much higher than it is today.
3. The Jordan River delta has been extended by sedimentation.

=== Bronze and Iron Ages ===
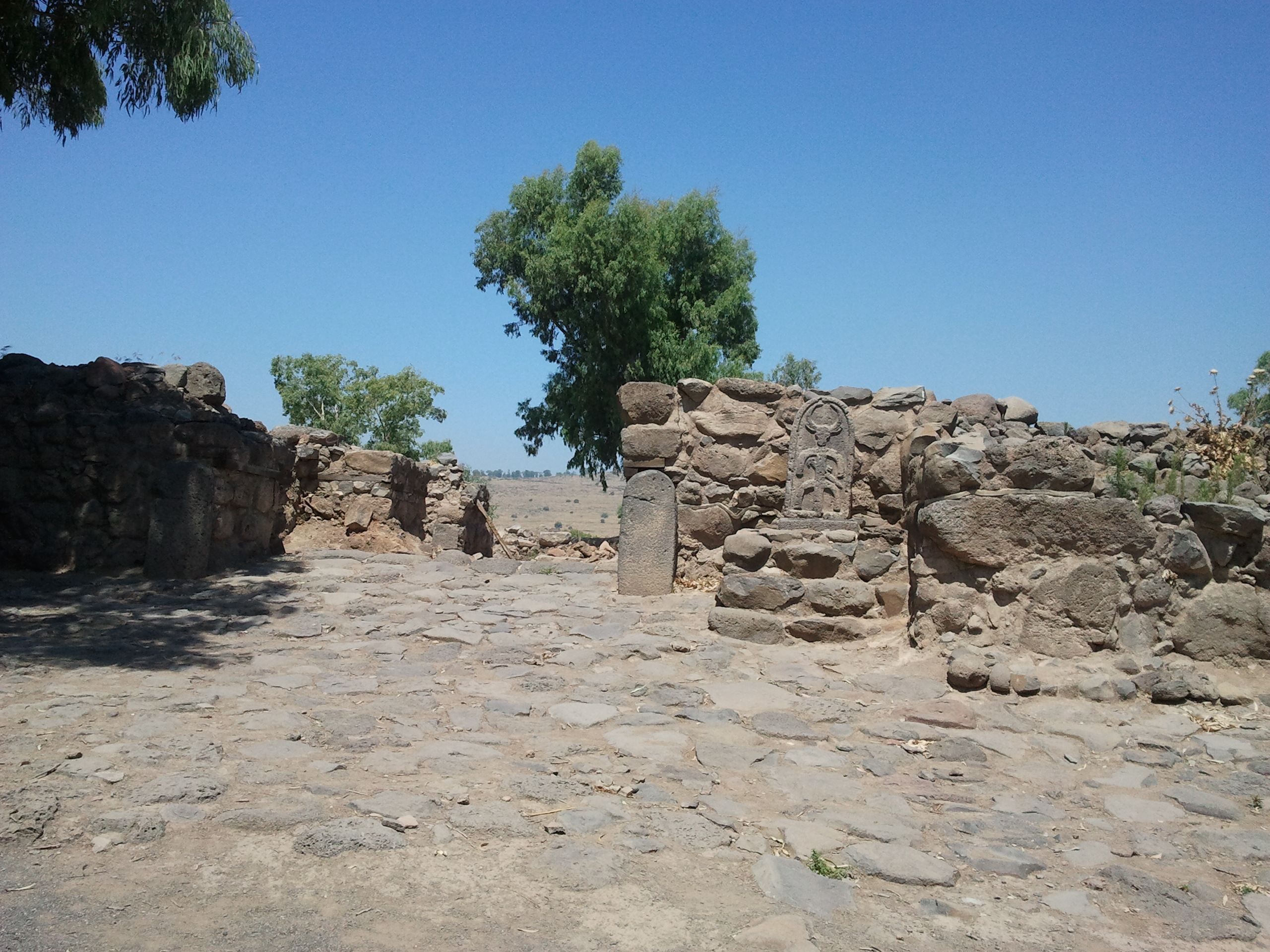
Inside the Iron-Age city gate, et-Tell

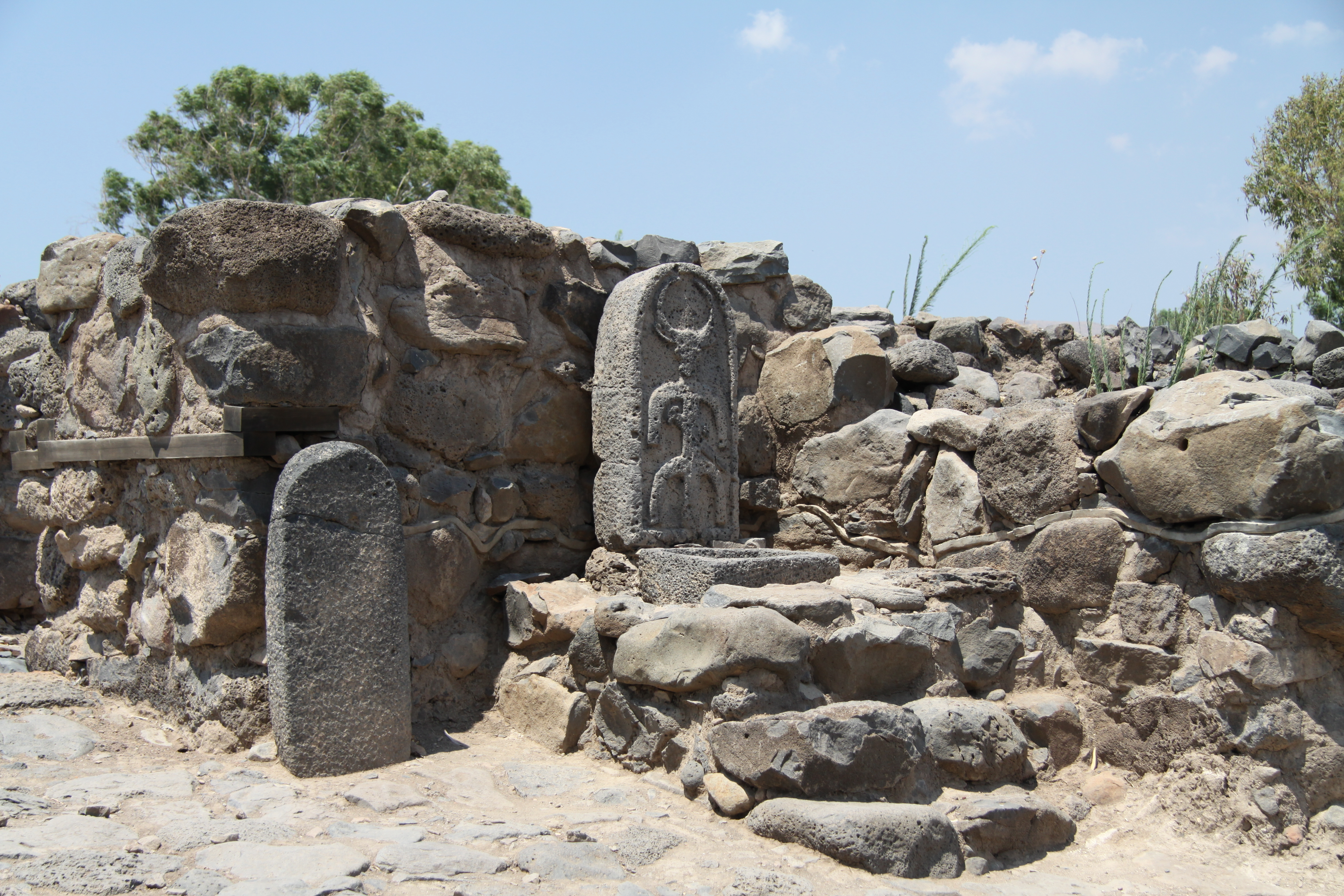
Shrine with standing stones at Iron-Age city gate, et-Tell

Excavations indicate that the settlement was founded in the 11th century BCE, in the biblical period. Et-Tell was inhabited during both the Bronze Age and the Iron Age. Researchers associate the fortified town there with Geshur, which is mentioned in the Hebrew Bible.

During the Iron Age, the site of et-Tell was very likely the capital of the Kingdom of Geshur.

Archaeologist Rami Arav, the head of excavations at et-Tell for many years, identified in 2018 the First Temple period city there with biblical Zer, a fortified city mentioned in Joshua 19:35.

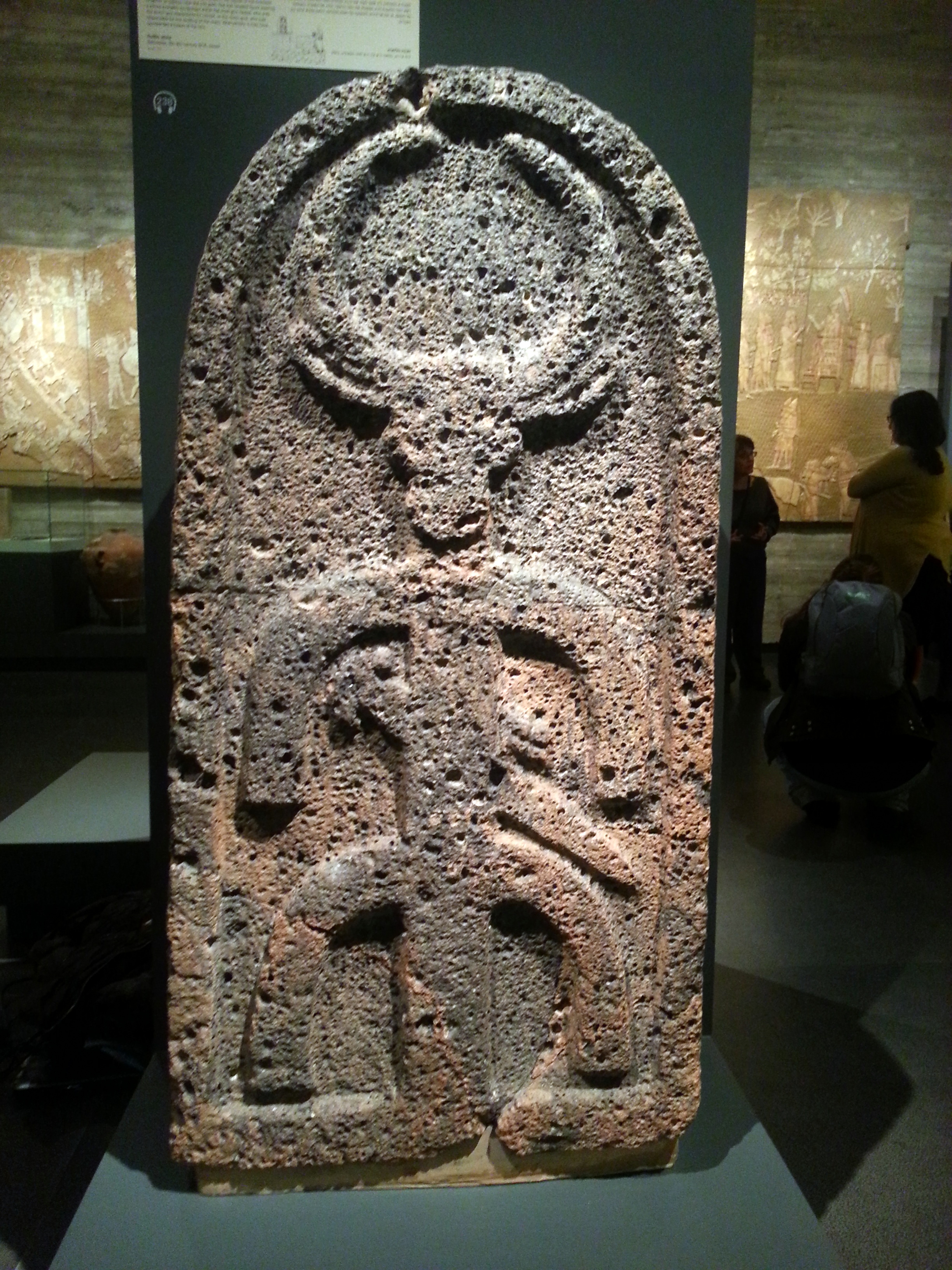
A stele from Bethsaida (et-Tell) depicting a Canaanite deity, possibly Kašku. On display at the Israel Museum in Jerusalem.

Most imposing archaeological finds, mainly from the Stratum V city gate, date to the 8th century BCE, but as of 2024, archaeologists have found the northwestern chamber wall of the Geshurite city gate of Stratum VI, dating to the 11th-10th centuries BCE. The et-Tell site would have been easily the largest and strongest city to the east of the Jordan Valley during the Iron Age II era.

The Iron Age city at et-Tell was destroyed in 734–732 BCE during the campaign of the Assyrian king Tiglath-pileser III, an event that also marked the end of the kingdom of Geshur. Archaeological evidence indicates a violent destruction, including widespread burning, structural collapse, and particularly heavy damage at the city gate. Finds such as arrowheads and the state of storage areas point to fighting and the exhaustion of supplies. The remains also show that portions of the gate complex were later dismantled and removed. Taken together, this evidence indicates that the Iron Age city came to an end in this episode and did not recover its former status.

=== Hellenistic and Roman periods ===
Et-Tell was reinhabited again in the third century BCE and continued on a lesser scale during the first century CE. Archaeological excavations at site have revealed fishing gear, including lead weights used for fishing nets, as well as sewing needles for repairing fishing nets. The findings indicate that most of the city's economy was based on fishing on the Sea of Galilee. Two silver coins dating to 143 BCE, as well as Seleucid bronze coins, bronze coins from the time of Alexander Jannaeus, King of the Hasmonean dynasty (reigned c. 103–76 BCE), and one coin from the time of Philip the Tetrarch (a son of Herod the Great), ruler of the Bashan (reigned 4 BCE – 34 CE), were discovered at the site. Philip the Tetrarch applied the name "Julias" (Greek: Ἰουλιάδα) to the site, which he named after Caesar's daughter.

== El-Mesydiah ==
El-Mesydiah, also spelled el-Mes‛adīyeh, is a third candidate, but generally considered the least likely one. It is located on the present shoreline, but preliminary excavations, including the use of ground penetrating radar, initially revealed only a small number of ruins dating from before the Byzantine period. Gottlieb Schumacher was inclined to favor el-Mes‛adīyeh, which stands on an artificial mound about 1.5 mi (2.4 km) east of the mouth of the River Jordan.

== One or two Bethsaidas? ==
According International Standard Bible Encyclopedia, many scholars maintain that all the New Testament references to Bethsaida apply to one place, namely, Bethsaida Julias. The arguments for and against this view may be summarized as follows.

Galilee ran right round the lake, including most of the level coastland on the east. Thus Gamala, on the eastern shore, was within the jurisdiction of Josephus, who commanded in Galilee. Judas of Gamala is also called Judas of Galilee. If Gamala, far up the slope towering over the eastern shore of the sea, were in Galilee, a fortiori Bethsaida, a town which lay on the very edge of the Jordan, may be described as in Galilee.

Josephus makes it plain that Gamala, while added to his jurisdiction, was not in Galilee, but in Gaulanitis. Even if Judas were born in Gamala, and so might properly be called a Gaulanite, he may, like others, have come to be known as belonging to the province in which his active life was spent. "Jesus of Nazareth" for instance was said to be born in Bethlehem in Judaea. Josephus also explicitly says that Bethsaida was in Lower Gaulanitis . Further, Luke places the country of the Gerasenes on the other side of the sea from Galilee (Luke 8:26) – antipéra tês Galilaías ("over against Galilee").

- To go to the other side – eis tò péran (Mark 6:45) – does not of necessity imply passing from the west to the east coast of the lake, since Josephus uses the verb diaperaióō of a passage from Tiberias to Taricheae.

But

  1. this involved a passage from a point on the west to a point on the south shore, "crossing over" two considerable bays; whereas if the boat started from any point in el-Baṭeiḥah, to which we seem to be limited by the "much grass", and by the definition of the district as belonging to Bethsaida, to sail to et-Tell or el-Araj, it was a matter of coasting not more than a couple of miles, with no bay to cross.
  2. No case can be cited where the phrase eis tò péran certainly means anything else than "to the other side".
  3. Mark says that the boat started to go unto the other side to Bethsaida, while John, gives the direction "over the sea unto Capernaum" (John 6:17). The two towns were therefore practically in the same line. Now there is no question that Capernaum was on "the other side", nor is there any suggestion that the boat was driven out of its course; and it is quite obvious that, sailing toward Capernaum, whether at Tell Ḥūm or at Khān Minyeh, it would never reach Bethsaida Julias.
- The words of Mark (Mark 6:45), it is suggested, have been too strictly interpreted: as the Gospel was written probably at Rome, its author not being a native of Galilee. Want of precision on topographical points, therefore, need not surprise us. But as we have seen above, the "want of precision" must also be attributed to the writer of John 6:17. The agreement of these two favors the strict interpretation.

In support of the single-city theory it is further argued that

  1. Jesus withdrew to Bethsaida as being in the jurisdiction of Philip, when he heard of the murder of John the Baptist by Herod Antipas, and would not have sought again the territories of the latter so soon after leaving them.
  2. Medieval works of travel notice only one Bethsaida.
  3. The east coast of the sea was definitely attached to Galilee in AD 84, and Ptolemy (c. 140) places Julias in Galilee. It is therefore significant that only the Fourth Gospel speaks of "Bethsaida of Galilee".
  4. There could hardly have been two Bethsaidas so close together.

But:

  1. It is not said that Jesus came hither that he might leave the territory of Antipas for that of Philip; and in view of Mark 6:30, and Luke 9:10, the inference from Matthew 14:13 that he did so, is not warranted.
  2. The Bethsaida of medieval writers was evidently on the west of the Jordan River. If it lay on the east, it is inconceivable that none of them should have mentioned the river in this connection.
  3. If the Gospel of John was not written until well into the 2nd century, then John the Apostle was not the same person as the author John the Evangelist. But this is a very precarious assumption. John, writing after AD 84, would hardly have used the phrase "Bethsaida of Galilee" of a place only recently attached to that province, writing, as he was, at a distance from the scene, and recalling the former familiar conditions.
  4. In view of the frequent repetition of names in Palestine the nearness of the two Bethsaidas raises no difficulty. The abundance of fish at each place furnished a good reason for the recurrence of the name.

== Fifth Crusade (1217) ==
During the Fifth Crusade, the very large Christian army gathered by King Andrew II of Hungary forced Sultan Al-Adil I to abandon Beisan on 10 November 1217. It then continued marching, crossed the River Jordan, pillaged, crossed it back again, and the crusaders took time to visit the holy Christian sites along the Sea of Galilee, including what Oliver of Paderborn called Bethsaida, which he described as a small casale (a village or hamlet), without offering any further details about its location.

== See also ==
- The Sea of Galilee Boat
- New Testament places associated with Jesus
- Woes to the unrepentant cities

== Bibliography ==
- Freund, Richard A. (1995). "The Search for the Bethsaida in Rabbinic Literature". Bethsaida: A City by the North Shore of the Sea of Galilee. 1. Kirksville, Mo.: Thomas Jefferson University Press.
- Klein, S. (1915). "Hebräische Ortsnamen bei Josephus". Monatsschrift für die Geschichte und Wissenschaft des Judenthums (in German). 59 (7/9). Breslau: 167–168. JSTOR 23080489.
- Kuhn, Heinz-Wolfgang (2015). Bethsaida – Julias (et-Tell), the First Twenty-Five Years of Excavation (1987–2011). Vandenhoech & Ruprecht. ISBN 978-3-525-54025-1.
