= Feeding the multitude =

Miracles carried out by Jesus according to the Bible

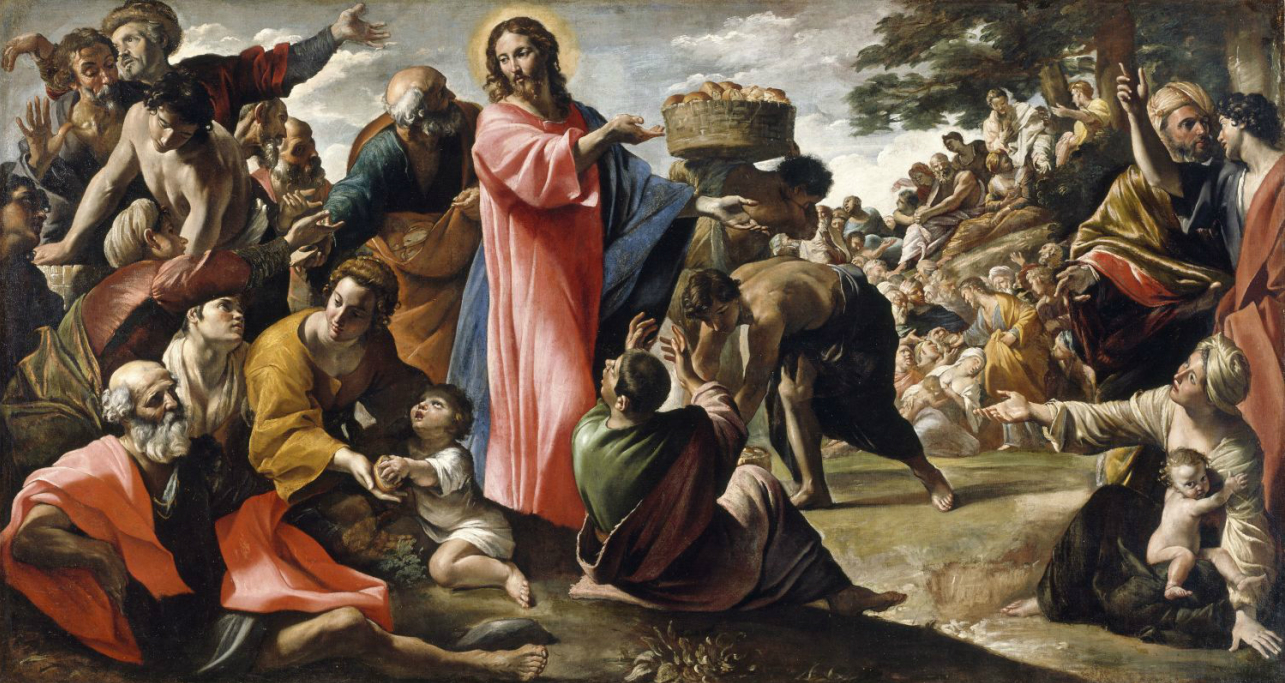
Miracle of the Bread and Fish by Giovanni Lanfranco, 1623 (National Gallery of Ireland).

In Christianity, feeding the multitude consists of two separate miracles of Jesus, reported in the Gospels, in which Jesus used modest resources to feed thousands of followers who had gathered to see him heal the sick.

The first miracle, the "Feeding of the 5,000", is the only miracle—aside from the resurrection—recorded in all four gospels (Matthew 14:13–21; Mark 6:31–44; Luke 9:12–17; John 6:1–14).

The second miracle, the "Feeding of the 4,000", with seven loaves of bread and a few small fish, is reported in Matthew 15:32–39 and Mark 8:1–9 but not in Luke or John.

== The feeding of the 5,000 ==
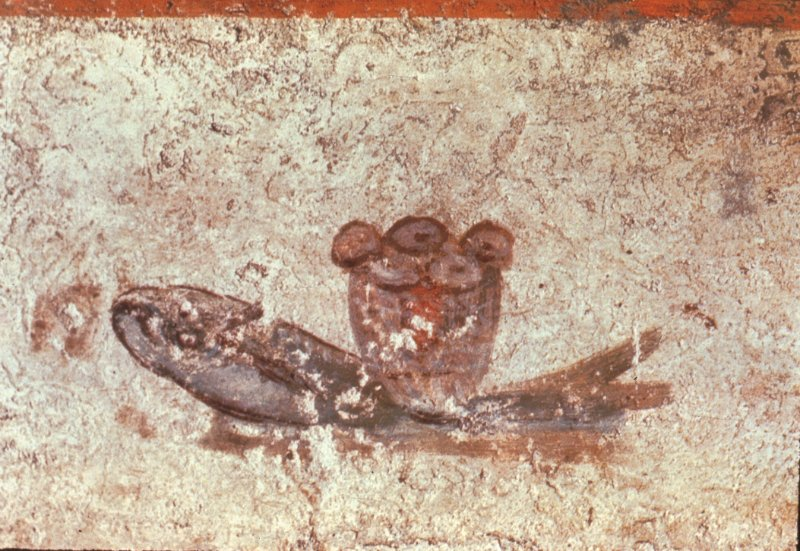
Eucharistic bread and fish. Early third-century painting from the Catacomb of Callixtus, Rome.

The Feeding of the 5,000 is also known as the "miracle of the five loaves and two fish"; the Gospel of John reports that Jesus used five loaves and two fish supplied by a boy to feed a multitude. According to the Gospel of Matthew, when Jesus heard that John the Baptist had been killed, he withdrew by boat privately to a solitary place. Luke specifies that the place was near Bethsaida. The crowds followed Jesus on foot from the towns. When Jesus landed and saw a large crowd, he had compassion on them and healed their sick. As evening approached, the disciples came to him and said, "This is a remote place, and it's already getting late. Send the crowds away, so they can go to the villages and buy themselves some food."

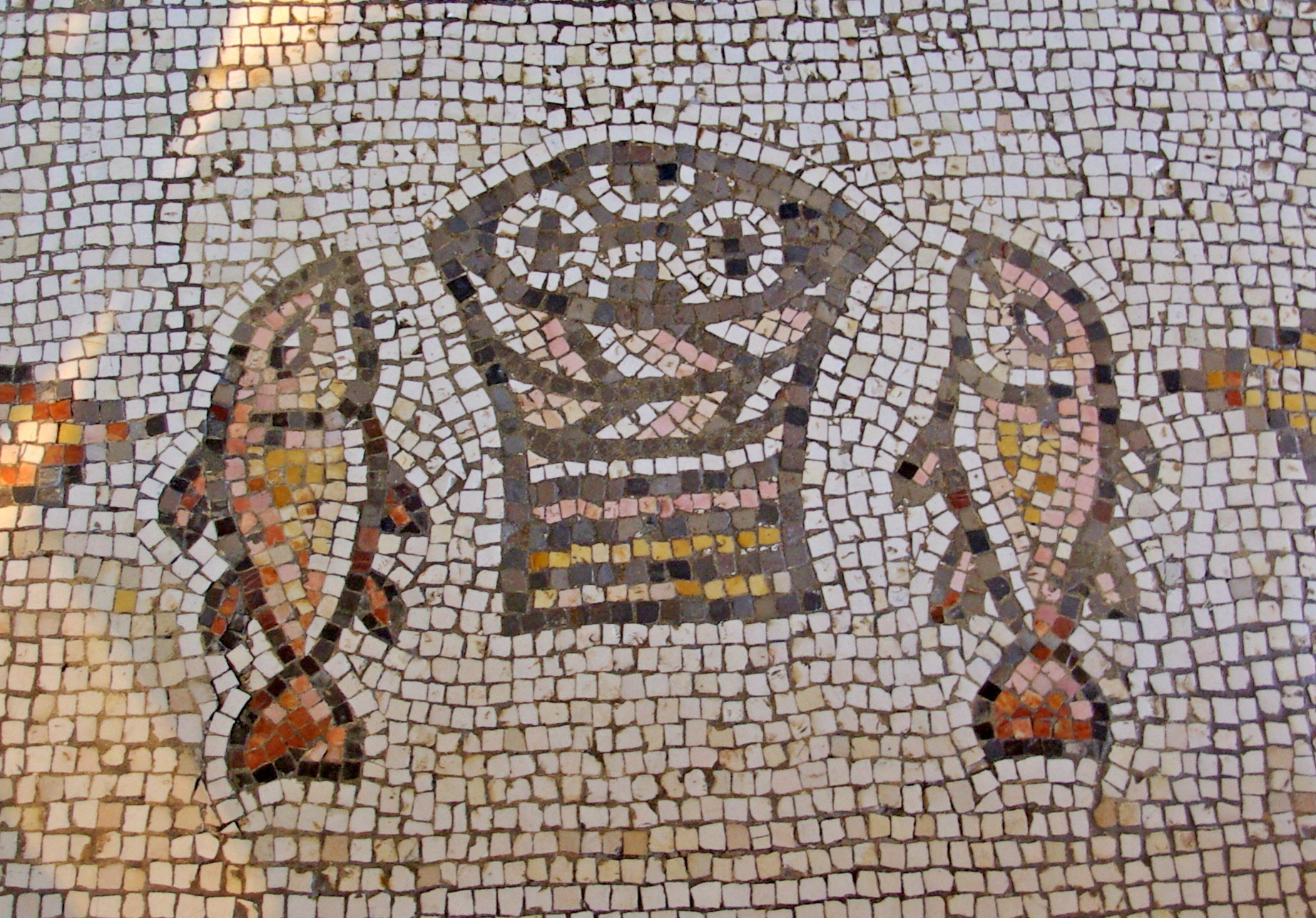
Mosaic of bread and fish in the Church of the Multiplication in Tabgha, Israel

Jesus said that they did not need to go away, and therefore the disciples were to give them something to eat. In all Gospels but John, they said that they only had five loaves and two fish left with them instead of a boy bringing it, which Jesus asked to be brought to him. In John's gospel, Andrew asked, "what is that among so many?". Jesus directed the people to sit down in groups on the grass. In the Gospel of Mark, the crowds sat in groups of 50 and 100, and in the Gospel of Luke, Jesus's instructions were to seat the crowd in groups of 50, implying that there were 100 such groups.

Taking the five loaves and the two fish and looking up to heaven, Jesus gave thanks and broke them. Then he gave them to the disciples, and the disciples gave them to the people. They all ate and were satisfied, and the disciples picked up twelve baskets full of broken pieces that were left over. The number of those who ate was about five thousand men, besides women and children.

In the Gospel of John, the multitude was attracted to Jesus because of the healing works he performed, and the feeding of the multitude was taken as a further sign that Jesus was the Messiah.

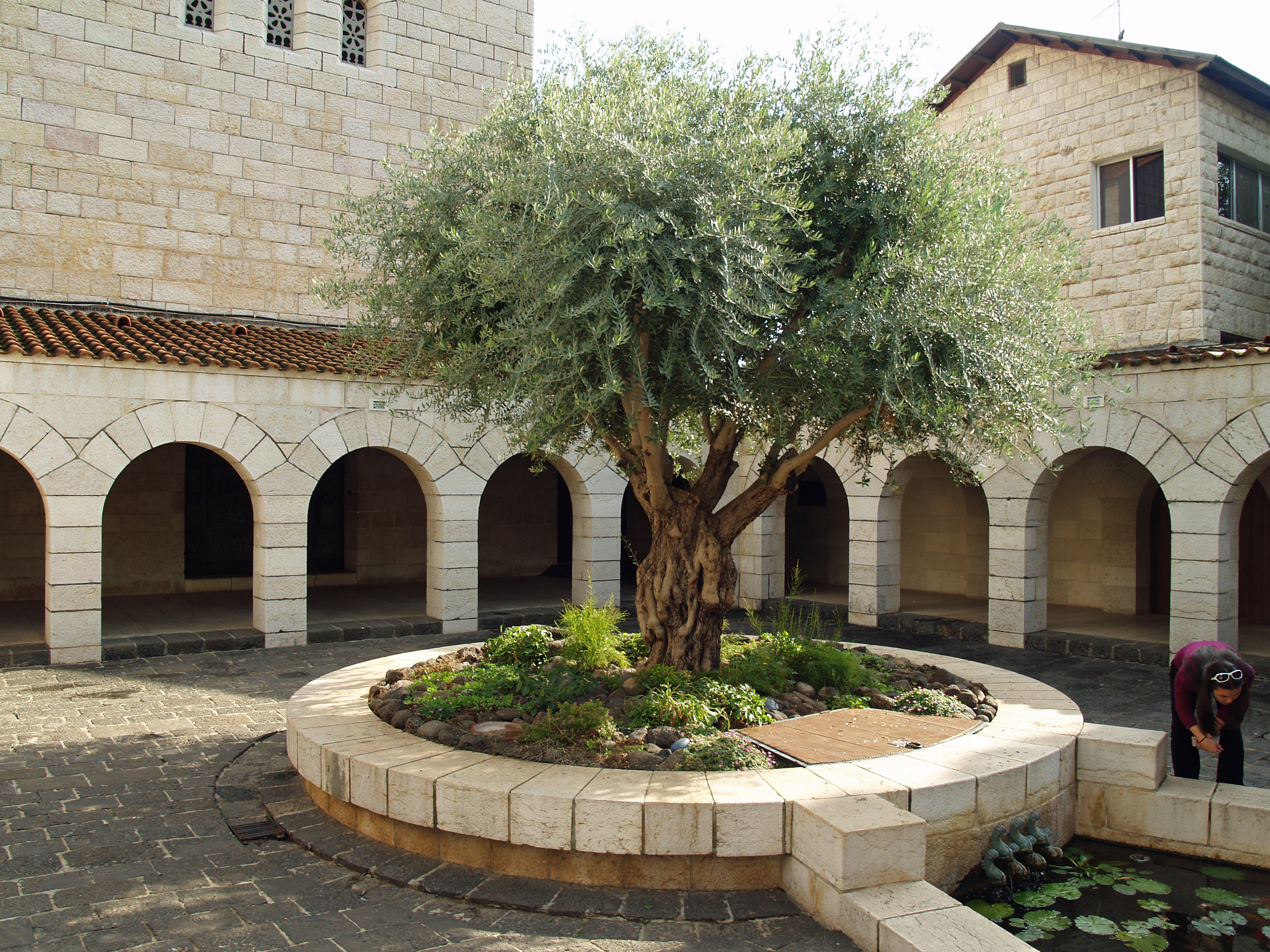
The Church of the Multiplication in Tabgha is the site where many Christians believe the feeding of the five thousand to have taken place.

== The feeding of the 4,000 ==
This story, which appears only in Mark and Matthew, is also known as the miracle of the seven loaves of bread and few little fishes because the Gospel of Matthew refers to seven loaves and a few small fish used by Jesus to feed a multitude. According to the Gospels, a large crowd had gathered and was following Jesus. Jesus called his disciples to him and said:

I have compassion for these people; they have already been with me three days and have nothing to eat. I do not want to send them away hungry, or they may collapse on the way.

His disciples answered:

"Where could we get enough bread in this remote place to feed such a crowd?"

"How many loaves do you have?" Jesus asked.

"Seven," they replied, "and a few small fish."

Jesus told the crowd to sit down on the ground. Then he took the seven loaves and the fish, and when he had given thanks, he broke them and gave them to the disciples, and they in turn gave to the people. They all ate and were satisfied. Afterward, the disciples picked up seven basketfuls of broken pieces that were leftover. The number of those who ate was four thousand men, besides women and children. After Jesus had sent the crowd away, he got into the boat and went to the vicinity of Magadan (or Magdala).

== Analysis ==
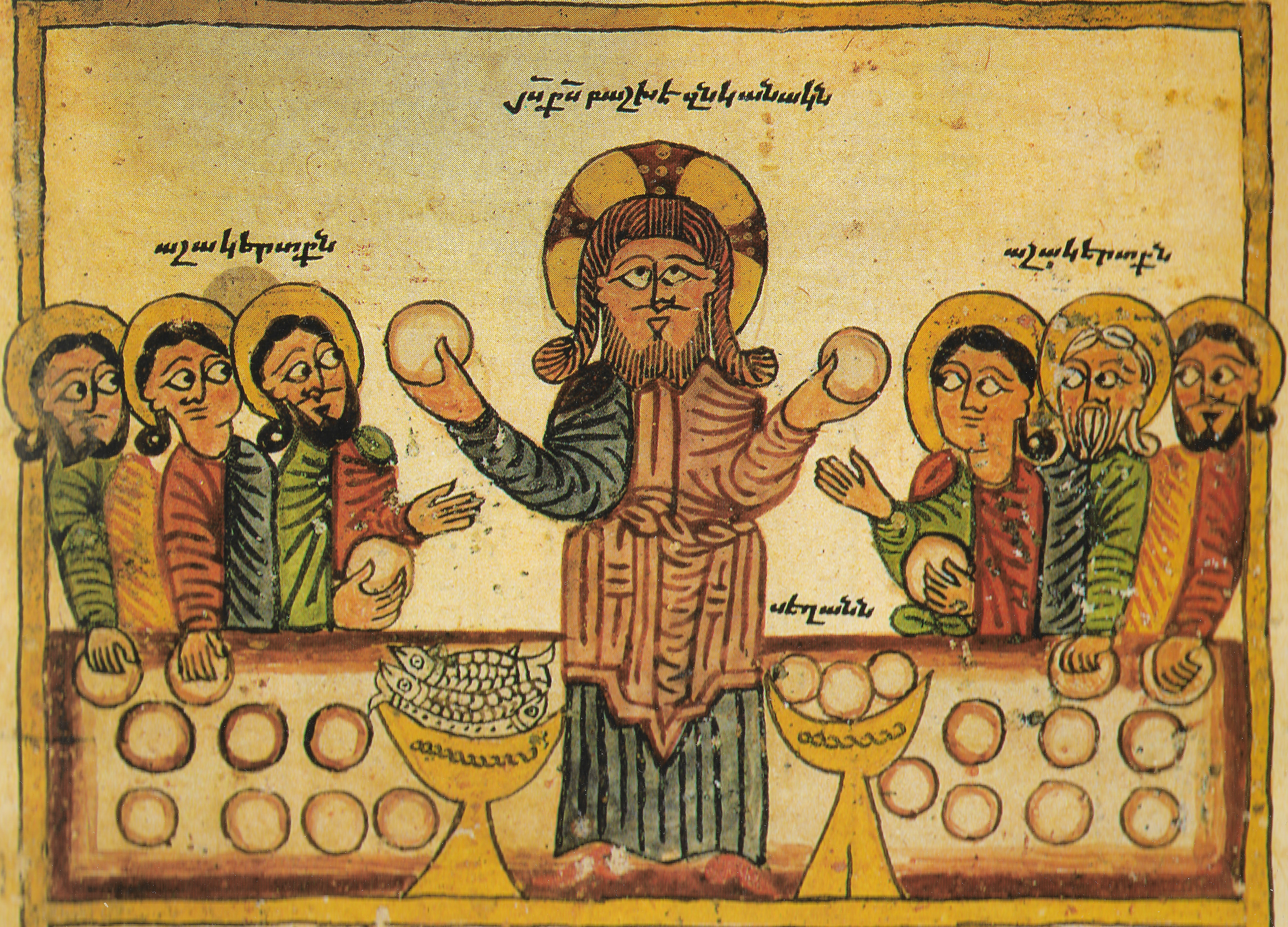
Feeding the multitude. Armenian manuscript. Daniel of Uranc gospel, 1433.

Heinrich August Wilhelm Meyer notes the differences between some of the details of the accounts as a means of emphasizing that there were two distinct miracles: for example, the baskets used for collecting the food that remained were twelve κόφινοι kófinoi ('hand baskets') in Mark 6:43 but seven σπυρίδες spyrídes ('large baskets') in Mark 8:8. Cornelius a Lapide stated that a σπυρίς spyrís or 'large basket' was double the size of a κόφινος kófinos. An indication of the size of a spyrís is that the apostle Paul was let out of a building through a gap in the Damascus city wall in one in order to avert a plot to kill him (Acts 9:25).

Meyer also comments that in the Gospel of John, the feeding of the multitude is taken as a further sign (Biblical Greek: σημεῖον sémeion) that Jesus is the Messiah, the prophet who (according to the promise in the Book of Deuteronomy (Deuteronomy 18:15)) is to "come into the world" (John 6:14).

== Interpretation ==
German bishop Justus Knecht draws some moral lessons from the miracle, stating that it shows:

1. The importance of saying grace at meals, because before Jesus multiplied and distributed the bread, he "raised His eyes to heaven and prayed",
2. The importance of not being wasteful with food, because Jesus tells them, "Gather up the fragments, lest they be lost",
3. The goodness of Jesus, because he feeds those who seek him ("Seek first the kingdom of God and His righteousness, and all these things [which are necessary for the life of the body] will be added unto you"), and,
4. The annual multiplication of food, since the multiplication of loaves shows how every year God increases the seed sown by farmers (i.e., for every 10 grains of wheat sown in the ground, 300–400 grains are harvested).

Knecht and many other commentators also draw parallels between the miracle and the Eucharist.

Pope John XXIII used Andrew's words, "what is that among so many?" to inform the hope underlying his decision in 1959 to convene the Second Vatican Council despite the spiritual poverty he observed in the church at that time:

With this reference everything is said: as for an increase of energy, of coordination of individual and collective efforts aimed at producing, with the help of the Lord, an intense spiritual cultivation, for a more abundant and happy production of beneficial and holy fruits in the sense of adveniat regnum tuum, in a fervor of more fruitful parish and diocesan life.

== See also ==
- Chronology of Jesus
- Life of Jesus in the New Testament
- Ministry of Jesus
- Elisha feeding hundred men
- Church of the Multiplication

== Bibliography ==
- Brown, Raymond E. (1997). An Introduction to the New Testament. Doubleday. ISBN 0-385-24767-2.
- HarperCollins Bible Commentary (2000)
- Kilgallen, John J. (1989). A Brief Commentary on the Gospel of Mark. Paulist Press. ISBN 0-8091-3059-9.

Feeding the multitude Life of Jesus: Miracles
Preceded by To bring a Sword; Ministry of Jesus	New Testament; Events	Succeeded by Walking on Water; Miracles of Jesus
