= Australian Catholic Students Association =

- Motto: Via Veritas Vita (The Way, The Truth, The Life)
- Institution: Catholic Church
- Location: Australia
- Established: 1942
- President: Chelsea Hawke
- Affiliations: Australian Catholic Bishops' Conference
- Website: https://www.auscatholicstudents.com/

The Australian Catholic Students Association or ACSA is the peak body of Catholic students in Australia. The body was founded in 1942 as the University Catholic Federation Australia (UCFA), and has been renamed several times. In 1974 it became known as the Tertiary Catholic Federation Australia (TCFA) and in 1990 it was renamed the International Movement of Catholic Students Australia (IMCSA). The body has been known as the Australian Catholic Students Association since 2001.

ACSA is made up of Catholic tertiary students, predominantly from the eastern states of Australia. ACSA affiliated societies have a presence in many universities, including Macquarie University, the University of Sydney, the University of New South Wales, the University of Melbourne, Monash University, and the Australian National University. It is officially supported by the Australian Catholic Bishops' Conference.

The National President as of July 2026 is Chelsea Hawke. The national patrons of ACSA are Tracey Rowland, head of the Australian John Paul II Institute for Marriage and Family, and Anthony Fisher, Catholic Archbishop of Sydney.

== History ==
=== Background ===
In 1921, Catholic student leaders from 23 countries met in Fribourg, Switzerland to create the International Movement of Catholic Students (IMCS). Compelled to form an international union for peace after the events of World War I, national representatives were selected from Europe, the United States, Argentina, and Indonesia.

While studying at the University of Paris in 1938, Australian theologian Rosemary Goldie was commissioned to bring the IMCS to Australia by the General Secretary Rudi Salat. The Catholic Students' Society of the University of Sydney, the Newman Society, was affiliated in 1938, and intended to attend the 1939 World Congress. However, the outbreak of World War II limited both the actions of the IMCS and the ability of Australian Catholic students to interact with their international counterparts.

=== University Catholic Federation of Australia: 1942–1973 ===
The loose connection to the IMCS inspired Australian Catholic university students to organise more formally. Plans for a 1940 national conference of all Catholic students were delayed due to World War II. The inaugural national conference was held in 1942 under the name of the University Catholic Federation of Australia (UCFA). Founding members included E.H. Burke, neuroscientist John Eccles, and Rosemary Goldie.

=== Tertiary Catholic Federation Australia: 1974–1989 ===
In 1968, the movement was restructured and its focus moved from social activities to community building and social justice issues. In 1974, it was decided to re-structure the movement to make it more relevant to university students at the time and it was renamed the Tertiary Catholic Federation Australia (TCFA).

=== International Movement of Catholic Students Australia: 1990–2000 ===
The Movement then went through another restructuring period in 1990 when it was renamed the International Movement of Catholic Students Australia (IMCSA).

=== Australian Catholic Students Association: 2001–today ===
Since 2001, the organisation has been called the Australian Catholic Students Association and has been hosting national conferences and various other activities.

== Events ==
=== National Conference ===
ACSA hosts an annual national conference. This conference involves a series of theological and philosophical talks, a celebration of the Mass, and the Mannix Ball. The Ball is named after Daniel Mannix, a former Archbishop of Melbourne.

List of National Conferences
Year	Theme	State	Venue	Mannix Addressor
2003	N/A	(Victoria (state)) VIC	Janet Clarke Hall, Melbourne	Mark Coleridge SSD, Auxiliary Archbishop of Melbourne
2004	N/A	(Queensland) QLD	St Leo's College, Brisbane	James V. Schall SJ (cancelled due to illness)
2005	Be Not Afraid	(New South Wales) NSW	St John's College, Sydney	No Mannix Address delivered
2006	How Can We Know the Way?	(Victoria (state)) VIC	Newman College, Melbourne	Barry Hickey OAM KC*HS, Archbishop of Perth
2007	The Church and the Next Generation	(Australian Capital Territory) ACT	Abbey Function Centre, Canberra	Most Rev. Anthony Fisher OP, Auxiliary Catholic Archbishop of Sydney
2008	No conference held due to World Youth Day 2008 in Sydney.			George Cardinal Pell AC, Archbishop of Sydney
2009	Renewing all things in Christ	(Queensland) QLD	Duchesne College, Brisbane	Geoffrey Jarrett DD, Bishop of Lismore
2010	Rebuilding the Church and the World	(New South Wales) NSW	Lake Hume Resort, Albury	Tracey Rowland DHS, Dean of the John Paul II Pontifical Theological Institute for Marriage and Family Sciences
2011	Authenticity	(New South Wales) NSW	University of Notre Dame, Sydney	George Cardinal Pell AC, Archbishop of Sydney
2012	Defending Human Dignity	(Victoria (state)) VIC	Queen's College, Melbourne	Christopher Pearson, journalist and former proprietor of The Adelaide Review.
2013	Foundations of Faith	(Victoria (state)) VIC	The Women's College, University of Queensland, Brisbane	Mark Coleridge SSD, Archbishop of Brisbane
2014	Build my Church	(New South Wales) NSW	Lake Hume Resort, Albury	Tess Livingstone, journalist with The Australian
2015	For the Family. For the Faith.	(Victoria (state)) VIC	Ormond College, Melbourne	Angela Shanahan, journalist with The Australian
2016	Providence in Plain Sight	(New South Wales) NSW	Benedict XVI Retreat Centre, Sydney	Hon. Damien Tudehope, member of the New South Wales Legislative Assembly.
2017	You Have Made Known to Me the Paths of Life	(Queensland) QLD	St Leo's College, Brisbane	Hon. Matt Canavan, Australian Senator
2018	I Am With You Always	(Victoria (state)) VIC	Queen's College, Melbourne	Tracey Rowland DHS, Professor at University of Notre Dame Australia
2019	Be Not Afraid	(New South Wales) NSW	St Joseph's College, Sydney	John A. McCarthy KC GCPO KCSG, Australian Ambassador to the Holy See from 2012 to 2016
2020	No conference held due to COVID-19 restrictions in Australia.			No Mannix Address delivered
2021	Who Do You Say I Am?	(New South Wales) NSW	Held online due to COVID-19 restrictions	George Cardinal Pell AC
2022	Fight the Good Fight	(New South Wales) NSW	University of Notre Dame, Sydney	No Mannix Address delivered
2023	Be Not Afraid	(Victoria (state)) VIC	Queen's College, Melbourne	Tracey Rowland DHS, Professor at University of Notre Dame Australia
2024	Lux Mundi	(New South Wales) NSW	St Joseph's College, Sydney	Bishop Columba Macbeth-Green OSPPE, Bishop of Wilcannia–Forbes
2025	Out of the Shadows	(New South Wales) NSW	St John Paul II Catholic Student Centre, University of Sydney, Sydney	Danny Meagher, Auxiliary Bishop of Sydney
2026	Christus Rex	(New South Wales) NSW	Australian Catholic University, Sydney	Tracey Rowland DHS, Professor at University of Notre Dame Australia
