= Matthew 14:35 =

- ← 14:34 14:36 →
- Book: Gospel of Matthew
- Christian Bible part: New Testament

Matthew 14:35 is a verse in the fourteenth chapter of the Gospel of Matthew in the New Testament.

== Content ==
In the original Greek according to Westcott-Hort, this verse reads:

Καὶ ἐπιγνόντες αὐτὸν οἱ ἄνδρες τοῦ τόπου ἐκείνου ἀπέστειλαν εἰς ὅλην τὴν περίχωρον ἐκείνην, καὶ προσήνεγκαν αὐτῷ πάντας τοὺς κακῶς ἔχοντας·

In the King James Version of the Bible, the text reads:

And when the men of that place had knowledge of him, they sent out into all that country round about, and brought unto him all that were diseased;

The New International Version translates the passage as:

And when the men of that place recognized Jesus, they sent word to all the surrounding country. People brought all their sick to him

== Analysis ==
Once he came to Genesareth (cf. Mark 6:53), early in the morning, after the night's storm, and had disembarked, they recognized Him. The rumour of His arrival preceded Him, so it seems they brought all their sick (Mark 6:55), and "laid them in the streets through which He passed" (Mark 6:56).

== Commentary from the Church Fathers ==
Chrysostom: "But the Evangelist shows that it was now long time since Christ had come into these parts; for it follows, And when the men of that place knew him, they sent into all that region."

Jerome: "They knew Him by fame, not by sight; although indeed by reason of the greatness of the signs which He did among the people, He was known by face to great numbers. And note how great the faith of the men of the land of Gennezareth, that they were not content with the healing of the men of that country only, but sent to all the towns round about."

Preceded by Matthew 14:34	Gospel of Matthew; Chapter 14	Succeeded by Matthew 14:36
