= Matthew 14:24 =

- ← 14:23 14:25 →
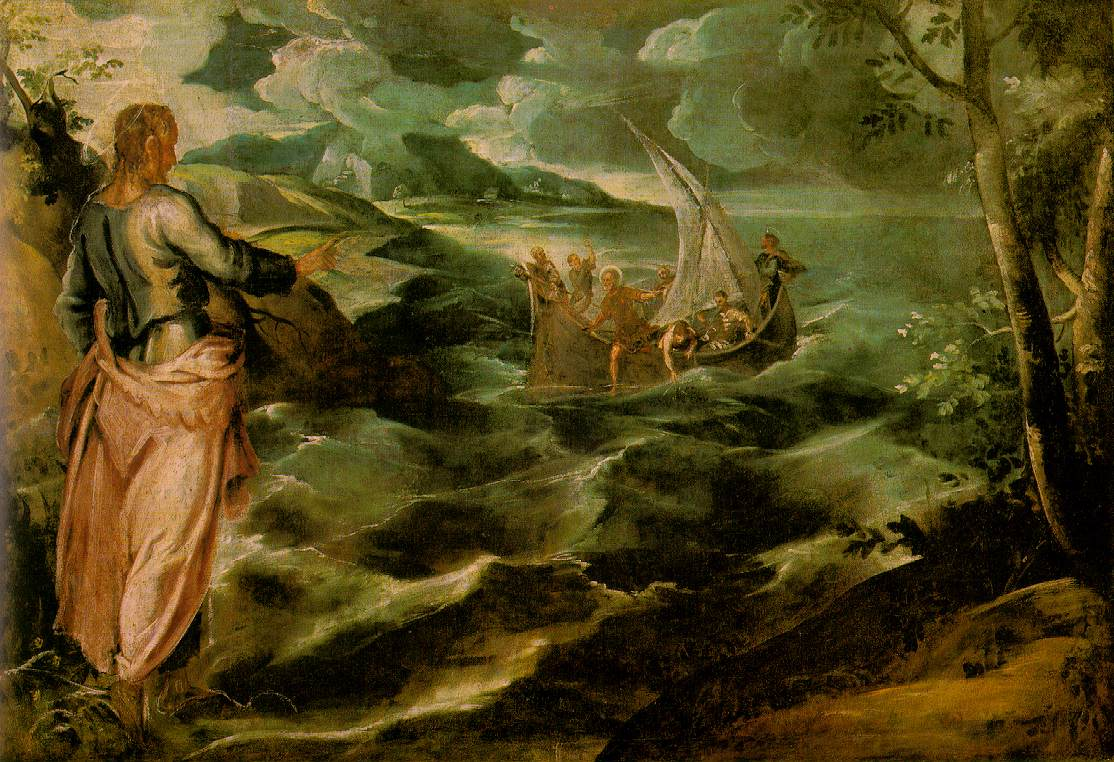
- "Christ at the Sea of Galilee"; Tintoretto (1570–1575).
- Book: Gospel of Matthew
- Christian Bible part: New Testament

Matthew 14:24 is a verse in the fourteenth chapter of the Gospel of Matthew in the New Testament.

== Content ==
In the original Greek according to Westcott-Hort, this verse reads:

Τὸ δὲ πλοῖον ἤδη μέσον τῆς θαλάσσης ἦν, βασανιζόμενον ὑπὸ τῶν κυμάτων· ἦν γὰρ ἐναντίος ὁ ἄνεμος.

In the King James Version of the Bible the text reads:

But the ship was now in the midst of the sea, tossed with waves: for the wind was contrary.

The New International Version translates the passage as:

but the boat was already a considerable distance from land, buffeted by the waves because the wind was against it.

== Analysis ==
It is said that the Lord deliberately caused the storm in order to test the faith of the disciples in His absence. This text is mirrored in John 6:17.

== Commentary from the Church Fathers ==
Jerome: "Rightly had the Apostles departed from the Lord as unwilling, and slow to leave Him, lest they should suffer shipwreck whilst He was not with them. For it follows, Now when it was evening he was there alone; that is, in the mountain; but the boat was in the middle of the sea tossed with the waves; for the wind was contrary."

Chrysostom: "Again, the disciples suffer shipwreck, as they had done before; but then they had Him in the boat, but now they are alone. Thus gradually He leads them to higher things, and instructs them to endure all manfully."

Jerome: "While the Lord tarries in the top of the mountain, straightway a wind arises contrary to them, and stirs up the sea, and the disciples are in imminent peril of shipwreck, which continues till Jesus comes."

Preceded by Matthew 14:23	Gospel of Matthew; Chapter 14	Succeeded by Matthew 14:25
