= Pax Romana (organization) =

International Catholic movement

- Founded: 1921; 105 years ago Fribourg, Switzerland
- Type: INGO
- Purpose: Religion, Peace, Education, Youth, Human Rights
- Location(s): Geneva, Switzerland (Pax Romana ICMICA/MIIC) and Paris, France (Pax Romana IMCS/MIEC)
- Region served: Global
- Method: Education, Nonviolence, Lobbying, Research, Innovation
- Official language: English, Spanish, French
- Website: www.icmica-miic.org www.imcs-miec.org

Pax Romana is an international lay Catholic movement. It combines the representation of two movements with similar interests and goals, the International Catholic Movement for Intellectual and Cultural Affairs (ICMICA or ICMICA/MIIC) and the International Movement of Catholic Students (IMCS or IMCS/MIEC). These two groups operate independently, but share the common name of Pax Romana in representation at the United Nations and UNESCO.

Pax Romana has many focuses, some of which are human rights, democracy, education, eradication of poverty, sustainable development, and inter-cultural/inter-religious dialogue. Each of these focuses is approached from the perspective of Catholic social teaching with the goal of promoting peace, in service of the common good.

== History ==
Pax Romana was created in two stages, first in 1921 with IMCS/MIEC (the student movement), then in 1946 with ICMICA/MIIC (the academic movement), and thus is made up of two complementary organizations.

In 1949, ICMICA/MIIC became one of the first NGOs (Non-Governmental Organizations) to be granted special consultative status with the United Nations Economic and Social Council and UNESCO.

During the Second Vatican Council, Pax Romana and many of its members played an important role. In 1963, a former FUCI (Pax Romana-Italy) chaplain Giovanni Battista Montini was elected as Pope Paul VI.

Each organization, IMCS/MIEC and ICMICA/MIIC, comprises many national movements. As of 2015, IMCS/MIEC brings together 83 national movements from 75 countries.

=== Name and motto ===
Pax Romana is a combination of two movements, ICMICA/MIIC and IMCS/MIEC. ICMICA stands for the International Catholic Movement for Intellectual and Cultural Affairs, and MIIC stands for the French and Spanish translation of this title (Mouvement International des Intellectuels Catholiques in French and Movimiento Internacional de Intelectuales Católicos in Spanish). IMCS stands for the International Movement of Catholic Students, and MIEC stands for the French and Spanish translation (Mouvement International des Étudiants Catholiques in French and Movimiento Internacional de Estudiantes Católicos in Spanish).

Pax Romana (Latin) refers to over 200 years of peace during the days of the Roman Empire, including the life of Christ. The motto of Pax Romana is "Pax Christi in regno Christi" (Latin), which translates to "peace of Christ in the kingdom of Christ".

== IMCS/MIEC ==
=== History ===
In 1921, student leaders from 23 countries met in Fribourg, Switzerland to create what is today the International Movement of Catholic Students (IMCS/MIEC). They felt compelled to form an international union to organize for peace after the world had been shaken by World War I. Between the two world wars, IMCS/MIEC had close relations with the League of Nations, with the goal to address the concerns of students around the globe.

Global tensions prior to World War II prompted IMCS/MIEC to expand its reach to North America. Thus, in 1938 IMCS/MIEC elected its first non-European president, Edward Kirchner from the United States, and in 1939 held its World Congress at Fordham University in New York and Catholic University in Washington, D.C. Throughout the war and following its end, IMCS/MIEC made a goal of providing relief to students who had been affected by the conflict.

Post-war, IMCS/MIEC sought more representation among Catholic students in Latin America, Africa and Asia. These efforts would lead to the development of many national movements throughout the continents. By having an organization comprising many national movements situated around the world, IMCS/MIEC is structured in a way to "enable local students to take creative ownership over their local structures while also allowing for considerable diversity among the member movements".

In 1946, the International Young Catholic Students (IYCS/JECI) movement was founded during Pax Romana's World Congress. IYCS/JECI is unlike its predecessor in that these movements are "organized in the tradition of specialized Catholic action. Although being autonomous to Pax Romana, these two organizations would work closely together, only to form an even closer bond with IMCS/MIEC in the 1970s, as the two launched joint national movements in Latin America, Europe and the Middle East. In light of this new strengthened working relationship, IMCS/MIEC would leave its offices in Fribourg, Switzerland to share a space with IYCS/JECI in Paris, France.

=== Structure ===
The International Team of IMCS/MIEC Pax Romana consists of a President, Secretary General, and Ecclesial Assistant. Elections to the International Team are held during the World Assembly, which takes place every 4 years. In between, the International Team convokes annual International Council Meetings.

The organization is composed of regional structures, of which some are joined with IYCS/JECI:

- Europe: JECI-MIEC Coordination
- Asia: IMCS Asia Pacific Coordination
- Middle East: JECI-MIEC Middle East
- Africa: IMCS/MIEC African Coordination
- Northern America: IMCS/MIEC Northern American Coordination
- South America: SLA MIEC-JECI - Latin America and Caribbean Coordination

== ICMICA/MIIC ==

=== History ===
As the IMCS/MIEC was founded in response to World War I, the International Catholic Movement for Intellectual and Cultural Affairs (ICMICA/MIIC) was founded after World War II, emerging from the graduate branch of IMCS/MIEC in 1946.

=== Structure ===
The International Team of ICMICA/MIIC Pax Romana consists of a President, Secretary General, Ecclesial Assistant and Regional Vice Presidents (who are also coordinators for a certain continent), and Vice President for Finance. Elections of the International Team are held during the Plenary Assembly, which takes place every 4 years. In between, the International Team convokes annual International Council Meetings.

Each regional board is elected for a 4-year term. These consist of 7 board members and a vice president of the given continent, who coordinates the work of the board. Elections are held during the Regional Assembly, which takes place after every International Congress. Each regional board is assisted by regional Ecclesial Assistant.

ICMICA/MIIC Pax Romana also has 6 Specialized Secretariats:

- SIQS - The International Secretariat of Scientific questions;
- MIJC - The International Secretariat of the Catholic Lawyers;
- SIIAEC - The International Secretariat of the Catholic Engineers, Agronoms and Industrialists;
- SIESC - The International Secretariat of Catholic High School Teachers;
- SIAC - The International Secretariat of Christian Artists;
- Women's vision (this group acquired the status of the International Specialized Secretariat during the World Congress in 2008.)

== Notable members ==
Following are notable members of Pax Romana in no particular order:

- Patricio Rodé: lawyer and Catholic university activist. Former international president of ICMICA/MIIC from 2004–05
- Piotr Cywiński: professional historian. Was the international Vice President of ICMICA/regional president for Europe
- Joaquín Ruiz-Giménez Cortés: politician and jurist from Spain
- Rosemary Goldie: Roman Catholic theologian from Australia
- Jean Nsonjiba Lokenga: worked for Amnesty International and was elected president of ICMICA/MIIC after the death of Patricio Rodé in Nov. 2005
- Gustavo Gutiérrez: Peruvian theologian, chaplain of UNEC and MPC
- Albert Nolan, O.P.: South African priest and activist
- Tissa Balasuriya: Sri Lankan priest and theologian, was ICMICA/MIIC Asia regional chaplain
- John Courtney Murray, SJ: was chaplain of Pax Romana's wartime office in Washington D.C. during World War II
- Ramon Sugranyes De Franch: Catalan lecturer, was president of ICMICA/MIIC
- Blessed Pier Giorgio Frassati: founding member of IMCS/MIEC
- Konrad Adenauer: first Chancellor of the Federal Republic of Germany (West Germany)
- Pierre Werner: was Prime Minister of Luxembourg, international Vice President of ICMICA/MIIC Pax Romana
- Maria de Lourdes Pintasilgo: was Prime Minister of Portugal and Prime Minister of Europe, president of IMCS in 1956
- Vittorino Veronese: was Director General of UNESCO from 1958-1961, one of the founding members of ICMICA/MIIC, ICMICA/MIIC Vice President, and former member of FUCI
- Rafael Caldera: served as the 56th and 63rd President of Venezuela, founding member of Venezuela's Christian Democratic party COPEI
- Pope Paul VI: was the chaplain of FUCI, one of the founders of ICMICA/MIIC Pax Romana
- Chico Whitaker: Brazilian architect, politician and social activist
- José Piñera Carvallo: Chilean engineer, diplomat and Christian Democratic politician, founder and first president of the Federation of Catholic University Students (FEUC)
- Sergi Gordo Rodríguez: Priest from Barcelona, Spain
- Marcel Marcel Clement Akpovo: A human rights defender and director at the United Nations

== Notable national movements ==
Following are some notable national member movements of Pax Romana in no particular order:

- FUCI: Federazione Universitaria Cattolica Italiana (Italian Catholic University Federation) of Italy
- Klub Inteligencji Katolickiej: Klub Inteligencji Katolickiej (Club of Catholic Intelligentsia) of Poland
- UNEC: Unión Nacional de Estudiantes Católicos (National Union of Catholic Students) of Mexico
- NCSC: National Catholic Students Coalition
- ACSA: Australian Catholic Students Association
- KMCP: The National Federation of Pax Romana in Kenya

Following are some notable national movements which were formerly affiliated with Pax Romana in no particular order:

- FEUC: Federación de Estudiantes de la Universidad Católica (Federation of Students of the Catholic University) of Chile
- FEUCA: Federación de Estudiantes de la Universidad Católica (Federation of Students of the Catholic University) of Argentina
- SCA: Student Catholic Action

== Achievements ==
Following are a list of notable achievements made by Pax Romana in no particular order:

- During World War II, IMCS/MIEC made a mission to aid and relief to students who were being affected by the conflict. In 1946, they sent over 600,000 books in different languages to student prisoners with funds from the Vatican and the National Catholic Welfare Conference.
- IMCS/MIEC played a founding role in creating the European Fund for Aid to Students, which in 1943 became the World Fund. This program, which was dissolved in 1949, aimed at helping student refugees, internally displaced peoples and prisoners.
- "During the Holy Jubilee Year of 1950, IMCS Pax Romana helped organize a pilgrimage to Rome for five thousand graduates and undergraduates".

== Representation ==
Pax Romana (jointly between IMCS/MIEC and ICMICA/MIIC) has a special consultative status with ECOSOC (Economic, Social and Cultural Council) of the United Nations. It has representatives in New York, Paris, Geneva, Vienna and Nairobi. It is also a member of CONGO (Conference of NGOs in consultative relationship with the United Nations).

Pax Romana is a recognized as a private organization before the Canon Law of the Catholic Church.
