= Matthew 14:29 =

- ← 14:28 14:30 →
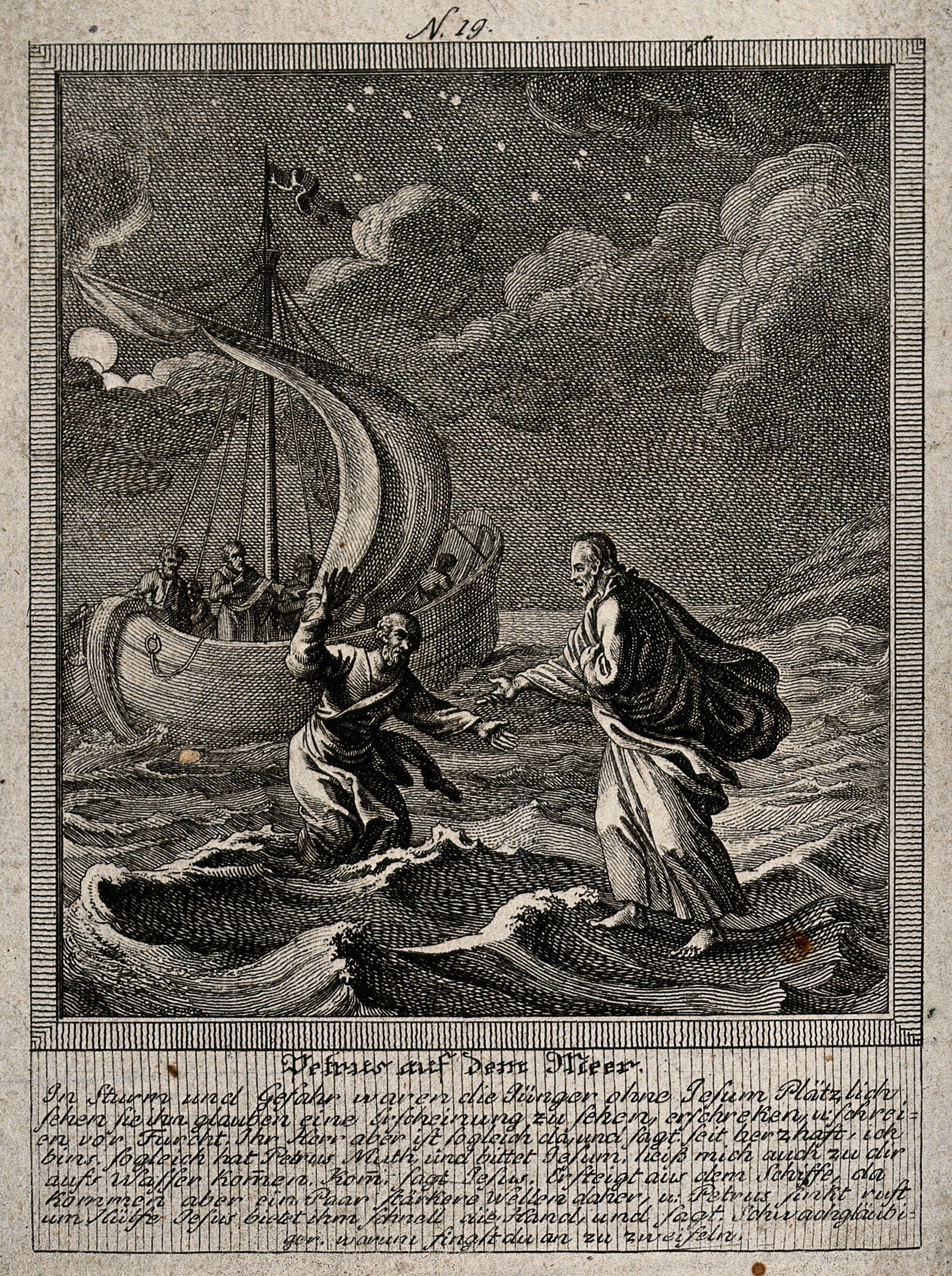
- "Peter walks on water towards Christ". Etching. Welcome Collection Gallery
- Book: Gospel of Matthew
- Christian Bible part: New Testament

Matthew 14:29 is a verse in the fourteenth chapter of the Gospel of Matthew in the New Testament.

== Content ==
In the original Greek according to Westcott-Hort, this verse reads:

Ὁ δὲ εἶπεν, Ἐλθέ. Καὶ καταβὰς ἀπὸ τοῦ πλοίου ὁ Πέτρος περιεπάτησεν ἐπὶ τὰ ὕδατα, ἐλθεῖν πρὸς τὸν Ἰησοῦν.

In the King James Version of the Bible the text reads:

And he said, Come. And when Peter was come down out of the ship, he walked on the water, to go to Jesus.

The New International Version translates the passage as:

"Come," he said. Then Peter got down out of the boat, walked on the water and came toward Jesus.

== Analysis ==
This verse shows the remarkable faith of Peter in Jesus. It is said that the Lord worked this miracle either by keeping Peter up with divine power, or by making the water firm and solid.

== Commentary from the Church Fathers ==
Jerome: "Let those who think that the Lord’s body was not real, because He walked upon the yielding waters as a light æthereal substance, answer here how Peter walked, whom they by no means deny to be man."

Rabanus Maurus: "Lastly, Theodorus wrote that the Lord had not bodily weight in respect of His flesh, but without weight walked on the sea. But the catholic faith preaches the contrary; for Dionysius says that He walked on the wave, without the feet, being immersed, having bodily weight, and the burden of matter."

Preceded by Matthew 14:28	Gospel of Matthew; Chapter 14	Succeeded by Matthew 14:30
