= Matthew 14:31 =

- ← 14:30 14:32 →
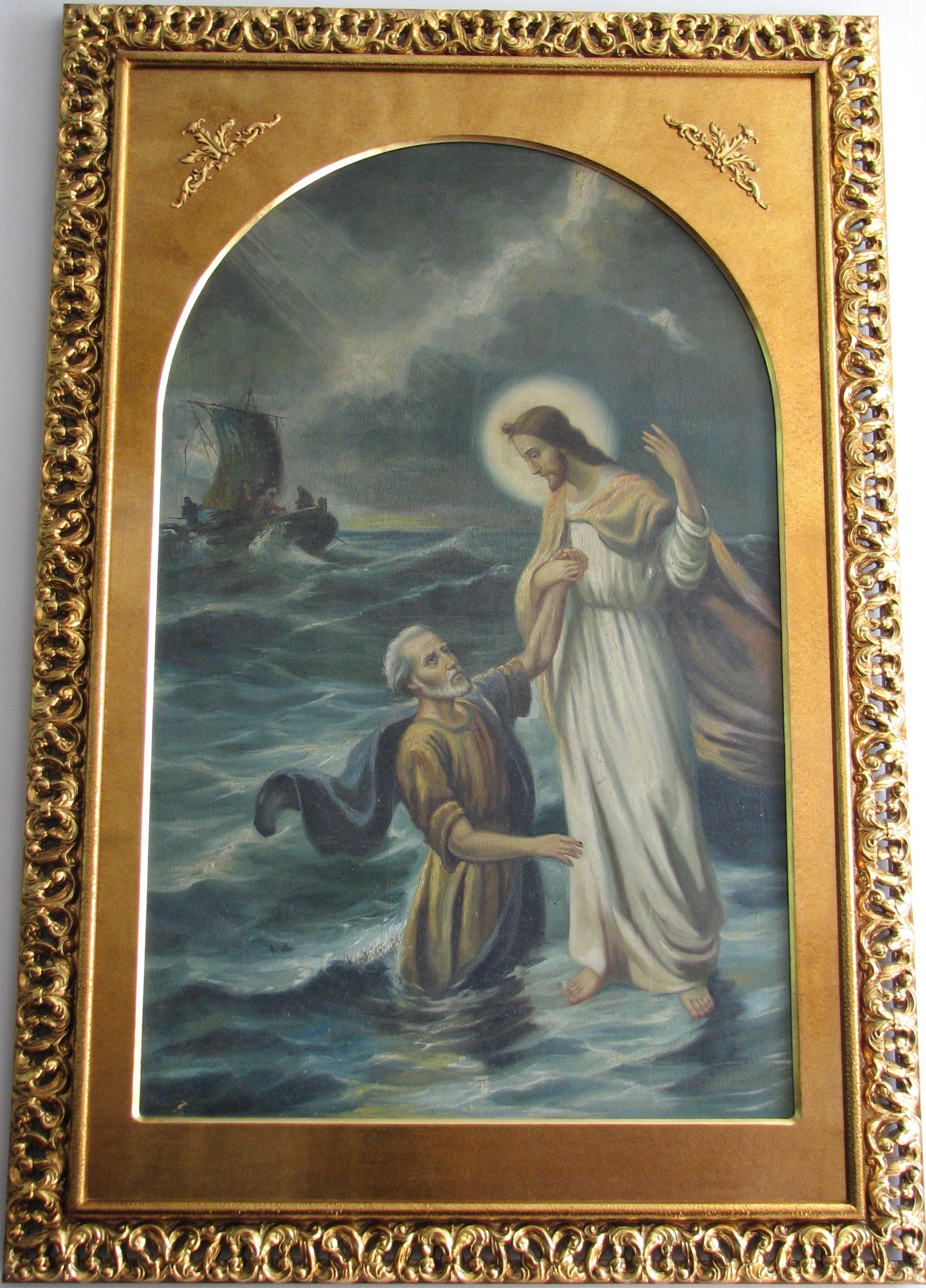
- "Jesus walking on the water of the Sea of Galilee", Greek Catholic Cathedral of Hajdúdorog, Hungary (beginning of the 20th century by unknown painter)
- Book: Gospel of Matthew
- Christian Bible part: New Testament

Matthew 14:31 is a verse in the fourteenth chapter of the Gospel of Matthew in the New Testament.

== Content ==
In the original Greek according to Westcott-Hort, this verse reads:

Εὐθέως δὲ ὁ Ἰησοῦς ἐκτείνας τὴν χεῖρα ἐπελάβετο αὐτοῦ, καὶ λέγει αὐτῷ, Ὀλιγόπιστε, εἰς τί ἐδίστασας;

In the King James Version of the Bible the text reads:

And immediately Jesus stretched forth his hand, and caught him, and said unto him, O thou of little faith, wherefore didst thou doubt?

The New International Version translates the passage as:

Immediately Jesus reached out his hand and caught him. "You of little faith", he said, "why did you doubt?"

== Analysis ==
"Why did you doubt" in Greek is εἰς τί ἐδίστασας, which literally is: why did you divide your mind in two? Because two things were here presented to Peter: the strength of the wind, making him afraid of being drowned, and the voice of Christ instilling confidence and security. Still, the strength of the wind was more obvious. The effect was to cause Peter's faith to fail.

== Commentary from the Church Fathers ==
Chrysostom: "He bade not the winds to cease, but stretched forth His hand and caught him, because his faith was required. For when our own means fail, then those which are of God stand. Then to show that not the strength of the tempest, but the smallness of his faith worked the danger, He saith unto him, O thou of little faith, why didst thou doubt? which shows that not even the wind would have been able to hurt him, if his faith had been firm. But as the mother bears on her wings and brings back to the nest her chick which has left the nest before its time and has fallen, so did Christ. And when they were come into the boat, the wind ceased. Then they that were in the boat came and worshipped him, saying, Truly thou art the Son of God."

Rabanus Maurus: "This may be understood either of the sailors, or of the Apostles."

Chrysostom: "Observe how He leads all gradually to that which is above them; He had before rebuked the sea, now He shows forth His power yet more by walking upon the sea, by bidding another to do the same, and by saving him in his peril; therefore they said unto Him, Truly thou art the Son of God, which they had not said above."

Jerome: "If then upon this single miracle of stilling the sea, a thing which often happens by accident after even great tempests, the sailors and pilots confessed them to be truly the Son of God, how does Arrius preach in the Church itself that He is a creature?"

Preceded by Matthew 14:30	Gospel of Matthew; Chapter 14	Succeeded by Matthew 14:32
