= Matthew 14:26 =

- ← 14:25 14:27 →
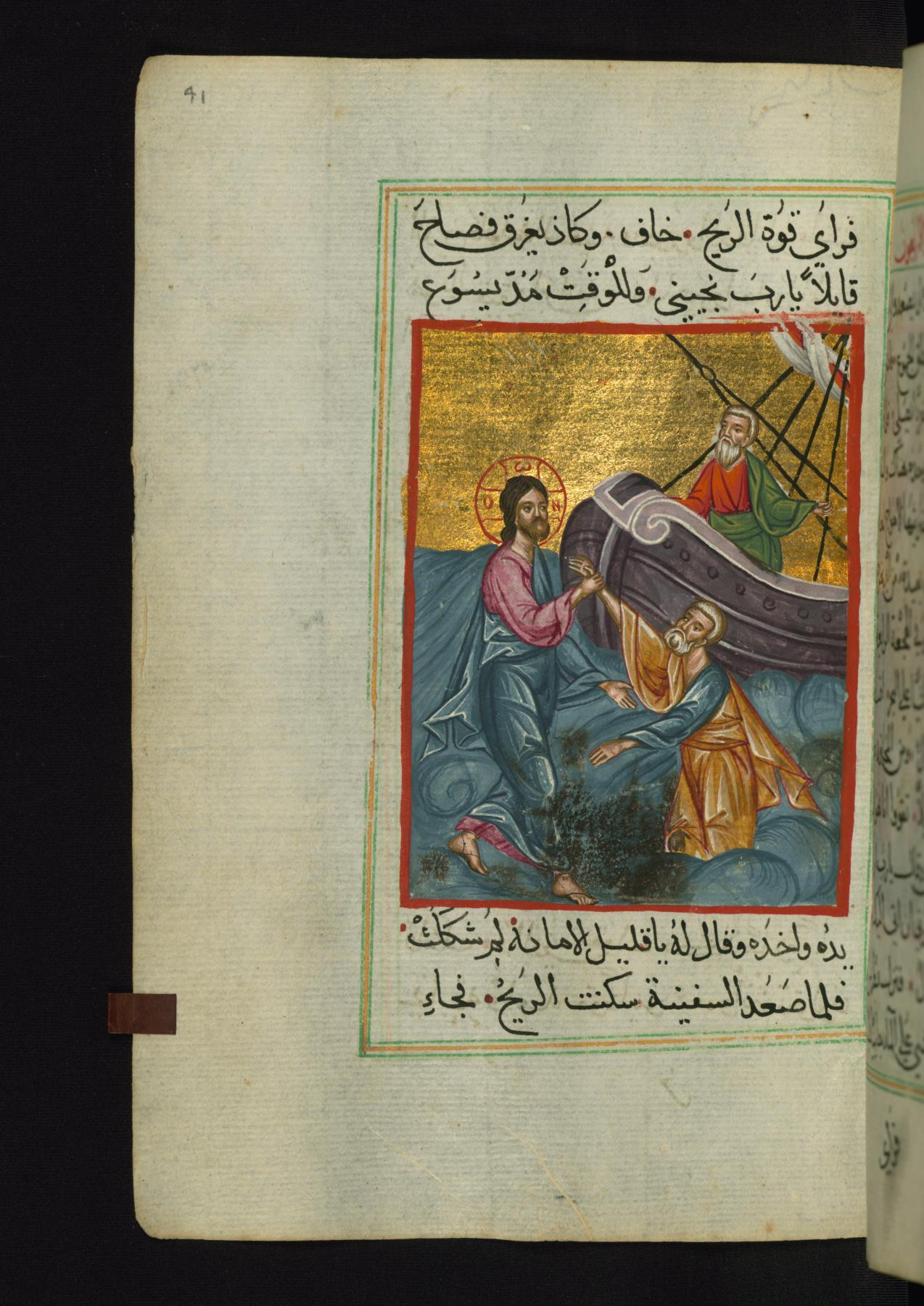
- "Jesus Walks on Water". Ilyas Basim Khuri Bazzi Rahib. Walters manuscript W.592 (1684)
- Book: Gospel of Matthew
- Christian Bible part: New Testament

Matthew 14:26 is a verse in the fourteenth chapter of the Gospel of Matthew in the New Testament.

== Content ==
In the original Greek according to Westcott-Hort, this verse reads:

Καὶ ἰδόντες αὐτὸν οἱ μαθηταὶ ἐπὶ τὴν θάλασσαν περιπατοῦντα ἐταράχθησαν, λέγοντες ὅτι Φάντασμά ἐστι· καὶ ἀπὸ τοῦ φόβου ἔκραξαν.

In the King James Version of the Bible, the text reads:

And when the disciples saw him walking on the sea, they were troubled, saying, It is a spirit; and they cried out for fear.

The New International Version translates the passage as:

When the disciples saw him walking on the lake, they were terrified. "It's a ghost," they said, and cried out in fear.

== Analysis ==
Because of the dark of night, the apostles were afraid of the sight of Jesus walking on the water. It was the common belief among the Jews, from scripture, that spirits existed, which sometimes appeared in human form. Night was believed to be the time for evil spirits. The Apostles, perhaps imagined the apparition, which now presented itself, to be ominous of a coming shipwreck.

== Commentary from the Church Fathers ==
Chrysostom: "Teaching them not to seek a speedy riddance of coming evil, but to bear manfully such things as befal them. But when they thought that they were delivered, then was their fear increased, whence it follows, And seeing him walking upon the sea, they were troubled, saying, It is a vision, and through fear they cried out. For this the Lord ever does; when He is to rescue from any evil, He brings in things terrible and difficult. For since it is impossible that our temptation should continue a long time, when the warfare of the righteous is to be finished, then He increases their conflicts, desiring to make greater gain of them; which He did also in Abraham, making his hot conflict his trial of the loss of his son."

Jerome: "A confused noise and uncertain sound is the mark of great fear. But if, according to Marcion and Manichæus, our Lord was not born of a virgin, but was seen in a phantasm, how is it that the Apostles now fear that they have seen a phantasm (or vision)?"

Preceded by Matthew 14:25	Gospel of Matthew; Chapter 14	Succeeded by Matthew 14:27
