= Matthew 14:30 =

- ← 14:29 14:31 →
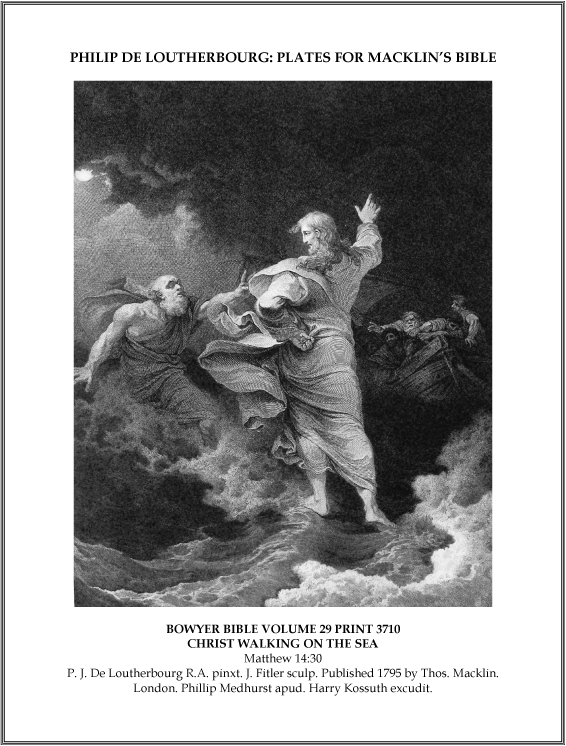
- "Christ Walking on the Sea". Matthew 14:30. Philippe-Jacques de Loutherbourg, Macklin (Bowyer) Bible (30 November 1795).
- Book: Gospel of Matthew
- Christian Bible part: New Testament

Matthew 14:30 is the 30th verse in the fourteenth chapter of the Gospel of Matthew in the New Testament.

== Content ==
In the original Greek according to Westcott-Hort, this verse reads:

Βλέπων δὲ τὸν ἄνεμον ἰσχυρὸν ἐφοβήθη· καὶ ἀρξάμενος καταποντίζεσθαι ἔκραξε, λέγων, Κύριε, σῶσόν με.

In the King James Version of the Bible the text reads:

But when he saw the wind boisterous, he was afraid; and beginning to sink, he cried, saying, Lord, save me.

The New International Version translates the passage as:

Then Peter got down out of the boat, walked on the water and came toward Jesus. But when he saw the wind, he was afraid and, beginning to sink, cried out, "Lord, save me!"

== Analysis ==
The force of the wind caused Peter to fear, and his fear caused doubt. Since his faith carried him on the waves, doubt caused him to sink. This doubt may be attributed to his not having received the Holy Spirit at Pentecost. It is said that Christ allowed this, so that Peter might recognise his own weakness, and might humble himself, and ask Christ to increase his faith, so that in time he might become the rock of the Faith: "Thou art Peter, and upon this rock will I build My Church."

== Commentary from the Church Fathers ==
Chrysostom: "Peter overcame that which was greater, the waves, namely, of the sea, but is troubled by the lesser, the blowing wind, for it follows, But seeing the wind boisterous, he was afraid. Such is human nature, in great trials ofttimes holding itself aright, and in lesser falling into fault. This fear of Peter showed the difference between Master and disciple, and thereby appeased the other disciples. For if they had indignation when the two brothers prayed to sit on the right and left hand, much more had they now. For they were not yet made spiritual; afterwards when they had been made spiritual, they every where yield the first place to Peter, and appoint him to lead in harangues to the people."

Jerome: "Moreover he is left to temptation for a short season, that his faith may be increased, and that he may understand that he is saved not by his ability to ask, but by the power of the Lord. For faith burned at his heart, but human frailty drew him into the deep."

Augustine: "Peter then presumed on the Lord, he tottered as man, but returned to the Lord, as it follows, And when he began to sink, he cried out, saying, Lord, save me. Does the Lord then desert him in his peril of failure whom he had hearkened to when he first called on Him? Immediately Jesus stretched forth his hand, and caught him."

Preceded by Matthew 14:29	Gospel of Matthew; Chapter 14	Succeeded by Matthew 14:31
