= Matthew 14:32-33 =

- ← 14:31 14:34 →
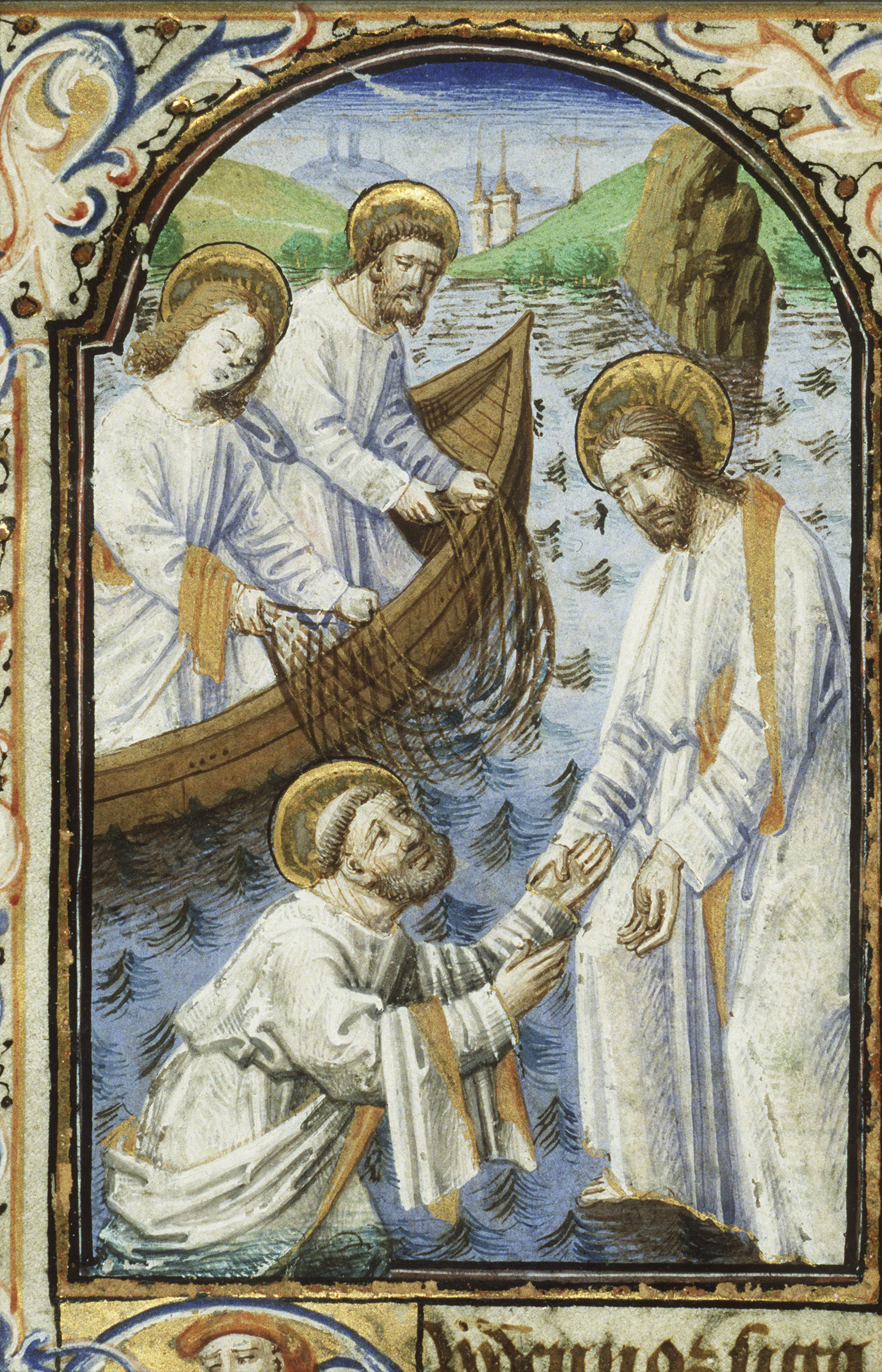
- "Christ appears at the Lake of Gennesaret, St. Peter walks on the water". Master of Jean Rolin II, from the "Book of Hours of Simon de Varie" (1455).
- Book: Gospel of Matthew
- Christian Bible part: New Testament

Matthew 14:32-33 is a pair of verses in the fourteenth chapter of the Gospel of Matthew in the New Testament.

== Content ==
In the original Greek according to Westcott-Hort, these verses read:

Καὶ ἐμβάντων αὐτῶν εἰς τὸ πλοῖον, ἐκόπασεν ὁ ἄνεμος·
οἱ δὲ ἐν τῷ πλοίῳ ἐλθόντες προσεκύνησαν αὐτῷ, λέγοντες, Ἀληθῶς Θεοῦ υἱὸς εἶ.

In the King James Version of the Bible the text reads:

And when they were come into the ship, the wind ceased.
Then they that were in the ship came and worshipped him, saying, Of a truth thou art the Son of God.

The New International Version translates the passage as:

And when they climbed into the boat, the wind died down.
Then those who were in the boat worshiped him, saying, "Truly you are the Son of God."

== Analysis ==
This narrative completes a total of five miracles connected with the sea:

1. Jesus walking on the sea
2. Peter's walking on the sea with Jesus's aid
3. When sinking, Peter is raised
4. The sudden ceasing of the storm
5. The immediate arrival on land.

From verse 33, it appears that both the sailors on the boat and the Apostles worshipped Jesus.

== Commentary from the Church Fathers ==
Augustine: "Or; That the disciples here say, It is a phantasm, figures those who yielding to the Devil shall doubt of the coming of Christ. That Peter cries to the Lord for help that he should not be drowned, signifies that He shall purge His Church with certain trials even after the last persecution; as Paul also notes, saying, He shall be saved, yet so as by fire (1 Corinthians 3:15)."

Hilary of Poitiers: "Or; That Peter alone out of all the number of those that were in the vessel has courage to answer, and to pray that the Lord would bid him come to Him upon the waters, figures the frowardness of his will in the Lord’s passion, when following after the Lord’s steps he endeavoured to attain to despise death. But his fearfulness shows his weakness in his after trial, when through fear of death, he was driven to the necessity of denial. His crying out here is the groaning of his repentance there."

Rabanus Maurus: "The Lord looked back upon him, and brought him to repentance; He stretched forth His hand, and forgave him, and thus the disciple found salvation, which is not of him that wills or of him that runneth, but of God that shows mercy (Romans 9:16)."

Hilary of Poitiers: "That when Peter was seized with fear, the Lord gave him not power of coming to Him, but held him by the hand and sustained him, this is the signification thereof; that He who alone was to suffer for all alone forgave the sins of all; and no partner is admitted into that which was bestowed upon mankind by one."

Augustine: "For in one Apostle, namely Peter, first and chief in the order of Apostles in whom was figured the Church, both kinds were to be signified; that is, the strong, in his walking upon the waters; the weak, in that he doubted, for to each of us our lusts are as a tempest. Dost thou love God? Thou walkest on the sea; the fear of this world is under thy feet. Dost thou love the world? It swallows thee up. But when thy heart is tossed with desire, then that thou mayest overcome thy lust, call upon the divine person of Christ."

Saint Remigius: "And the Lord will be with thee to help thee, when lulling to rest the perils of thy trials, He restores the confidence of His protection, and this towards the break of day; for when human frailty beset with difficulties considers the weakness of its own powers, it looks upon itself as in darkness; when it raises its view to the protection of heaven, it straightway beholds the rise of the morning star, which gives its light through the whole of the morning watch."

Rabanus Maurus: "Nor should we wonder that the wind ceased when the Lord had entered into the boat; for in whatsoever heart the Lord is present by grace, there all wars cease."

Hilary of Poitiers: "Also by this entrance of Christ into the boat, and the calm of the wind and sea thereupon, is pointed out the eternal peace of the Church, and that rest which shall be after His return in glory. And forasmuch as He shall then appear manifestly, rightly do they all cry out now in wonder, Truly thou art the Son of God. For there shall then be a free and public confession of all men that the son of God is come no longer in lowliness of body, but that He has given peace to the Church in heavenly glory."

Augustine: "For it is here conveyed to us that His glory will then be made manifest, seeing that now they who walk by faith see it in a figure."

| Preceded by Matthew 14:31 | Gospel of Matthew; Chapter 14 | Succeeded by Matthew 14:34 |
