= Albert Gilles =

French coppersmith

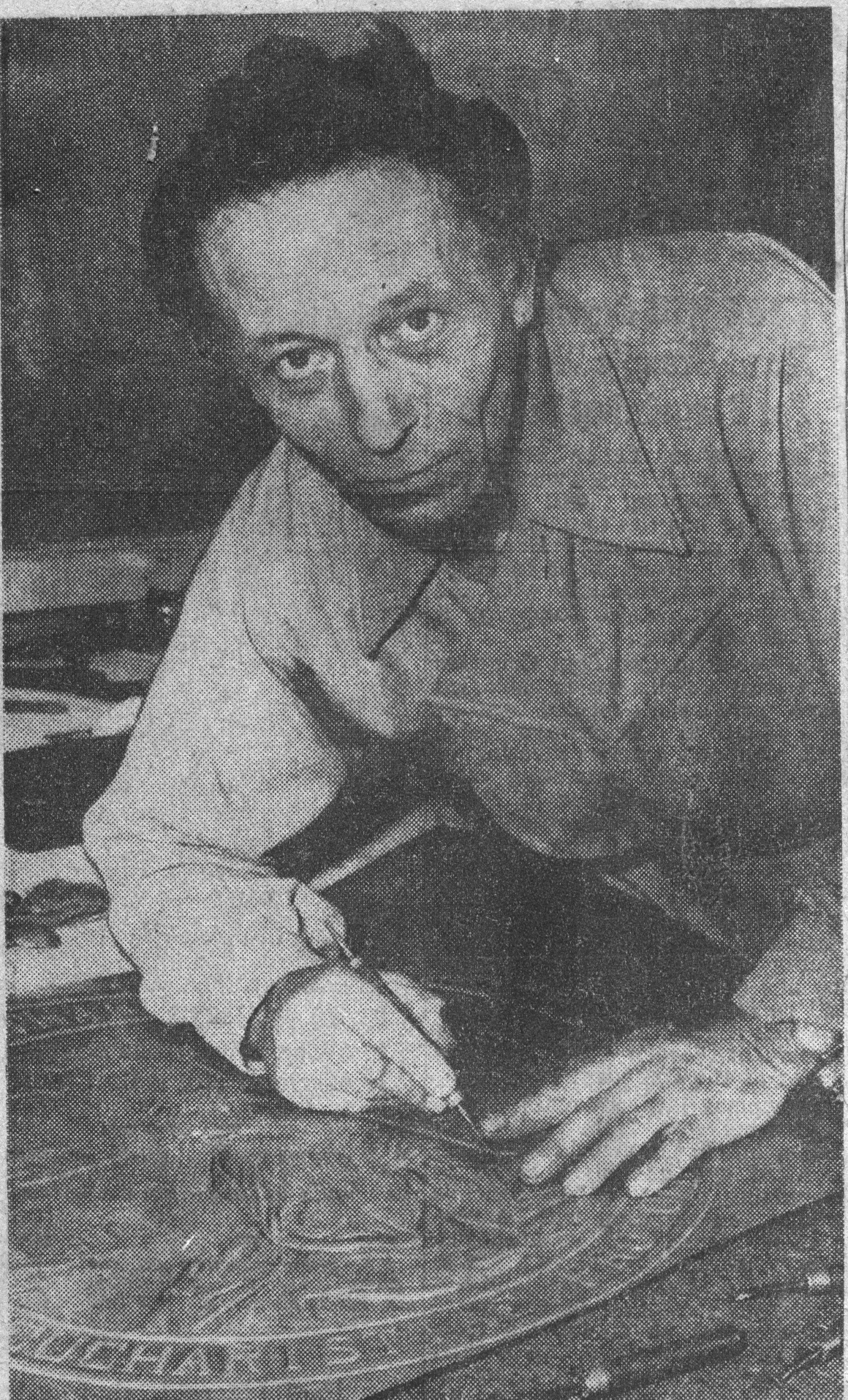
- Albert Gilles in 1950
- Born: Albert Louis Gilles; August 20, 1895; Paris, France
- Died: July 22, 1979 (aged 83)
- Known for: Coppersmith, Art, Religious artwork
- Notable work: Depiction of the Life of Jesus Christ
- Children: Palmyre Gilles
- Website: albertgilles-copper-art.com

Albert Louis Gilles (August 20, 1895 – July 22, 1979) was a French coppersmith known for his metalwork technique of shaping malleable metals. During his career as an artisan and designer, Gilles created public and private works for The Walt Disney Company, Chrysler, and General Motors. He is known for his later works depicting the life of Jesus Christ.

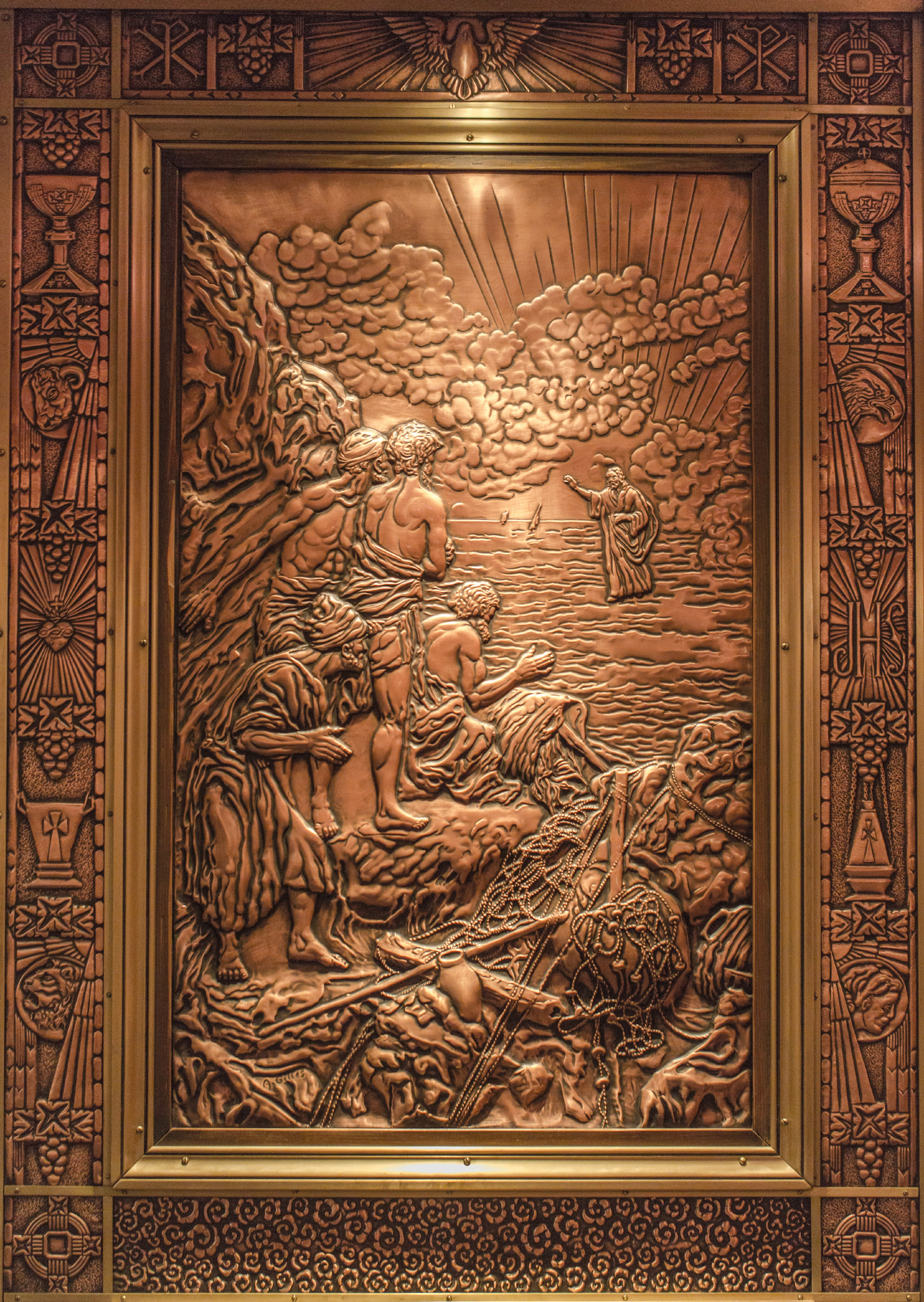
A relief scene of Matthew 14:25 from the doors of Basilica of Sainte-Anne-de-Beaupré.

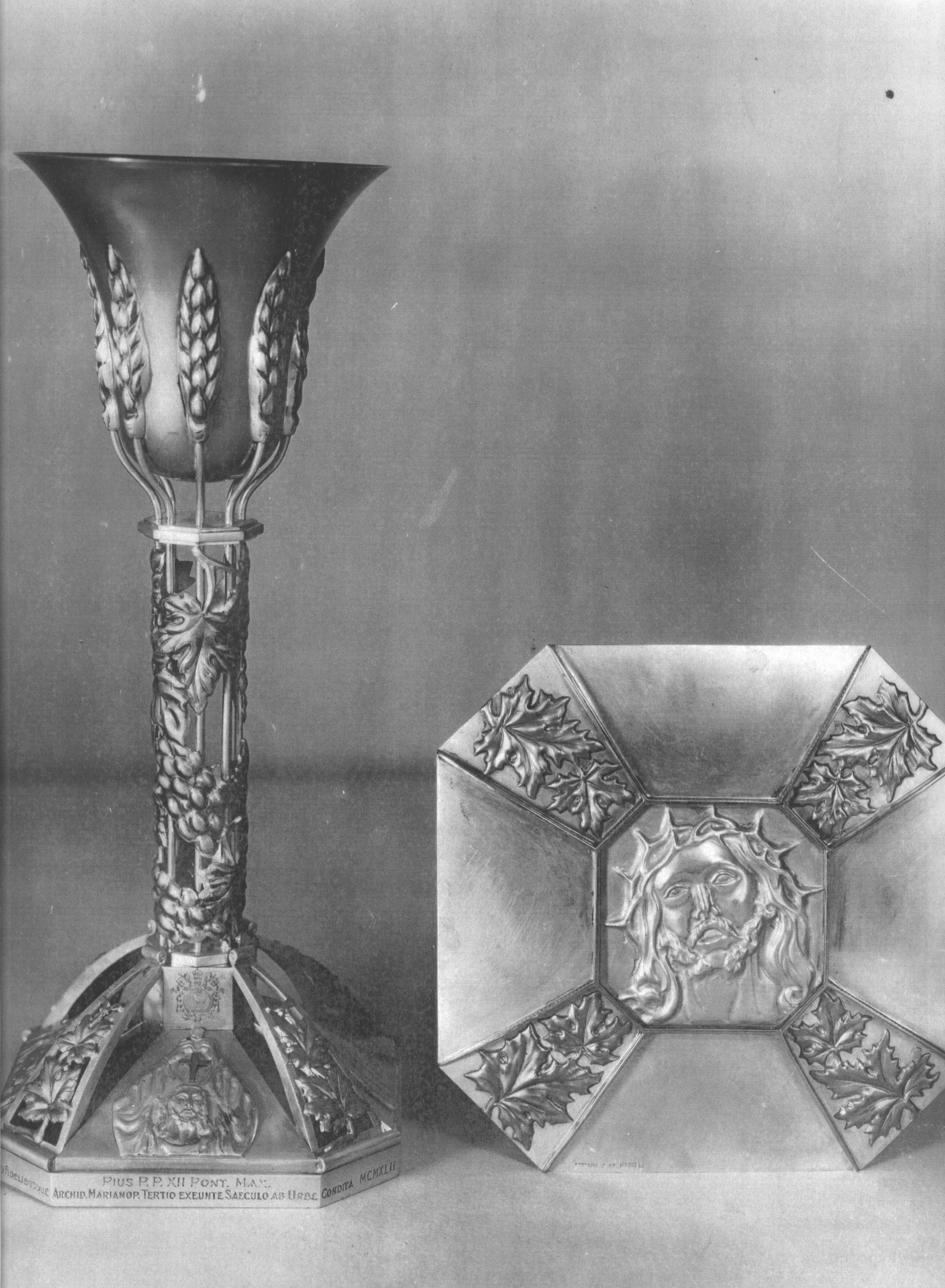
The depicted Chalice was commissioned by Pope Pius XII in 1942 to mark the 300th anniversary of the Archdiocese of Montreal.

== Early life ==
Albert Louis Gilles was born on August 20, 1895, in Paris, France. At the age of 12, his aunt introduced him to the art of repoussé, a technique of shaping malleable metals. He practiced this technique during evening art classes. Gilles served in World War I, where he injured his right hand. He rehabilitated his hand by milking cows at a farm in Normandy.

== Career ==
In 1927, Gilles immigrated to Quebec City, Canada. Two years later, he moved to the United States and settled in Detroit, where he founded the Albert Gilles Studio, later renamed Cuivres d'Art Albert Gilles, or the Albert Gilles Copper Art Studio. He worked as a decorator, metal sculptor, and silversmith in Detroit, Hollywood, and Los Angeles.

After returning to Quebec, Gilles began creating religious artwork for churches, including the Basilica of Sainte-Anne-de-Beaupré. He held an exhibition of 50 panels depicting the life of Christ in 1941. In 1942, he was commissioned by Pope Pius XII to design a Chalice and Paten for Montreal's 300th anniversary. One of his most complex works is Christorama, a hand-embossed depiction of the life of Jesus Christ in 50 tableaux. Gilles also created decorative elements for over 30 churches across Canada and other countries.

== Legacy and auction history ==
Gilles's work has been auctioned multiple times, with prices ranging from 15 USD to 71 USD, depending on the size and medium of the artwork. His highest auction price was 71 USD for an antique lamp sold at Champagne Auctions in 2022. The Albert Gilles Copper Art Museum in Château-Richer continues to operate as a boutique and museum run by his family.
