= Matthew 14:22 =

- ← 14:21 14:23 →
- Book: Gospel of Matthew
- Christian Bible part: New Testament

Matthew 14:22 is a verse in the fourteenth chapter of the Gospel of Matthew in the New Testament, which stands between the passage covering the feeding of the 5,000 in this gospel and the account of Jesus walking on the water.

== Content ==
In the original Greek according to Westcott-Hort, this verse reads:

Καὶ εὐθέως ἠνάγκασεν ὁ Ἰησοῦς τοὺς μαθητὰς αὐτοῦ ἐμβῆναι εἰς τὸ πλοῖον, καὶ προάγειν αὐτὸν εἰς τὸ πέραν, ἕως οὗ ἀπολύσῃ τοὺς ὄχλους.

In the King James Version of the Bible the text reads:

And straightway Jesus constrained his disciples to get into a ship, and to go before him unto the other side, while he sent the multitudes away.

The New International Version translates the passage as:

Immediately Jesus made the disciples get into the boat and go on ahead of him to the other side, while he dismissed the crowd.

== Analysis ==
The King James Version and the Geneva Bible (1599) refer to the vessel the disciples used as a "ship" but the term "boat" is preferred by more modern translators.

It is thought that Jesus was concerned that "the people would come and make Him king" (see John 6:15), so he had to constrain the disciples to leave him, even though they wanted very much to stay with him. Other possible motives of Christ are that he wanted to be alone to pray, or to create an opportunity for the next miracle, when he calmed the sea.

== Commentary from the Church Fathers ==
Chrysostom: "Desiring to occasion a diligent examination of the things that had been done, He commanded those who had beheld the foregoing sign to be separated from Him; for even if He had continued present it would have been said that He had wrought the miracle fantastically, and not in verity; but it would never be urged against Him that He had done it in His absence; and therefore it is said, And straightway Jesus compelled his disciples to get into a ship, and to go before him to the other side, while he sent the multitudes away."

Jerome: "These words show that they left the Lord unwillingly, not desiring through their love for their teacher to be separated from Him even for a moment."

Preceded by Matthew 14:21	Gospel of Matthew; Chapter 14	Succeeded by Matthew 14:23
