= Matthew 14:28 =

- ← 14:27 14:29 →
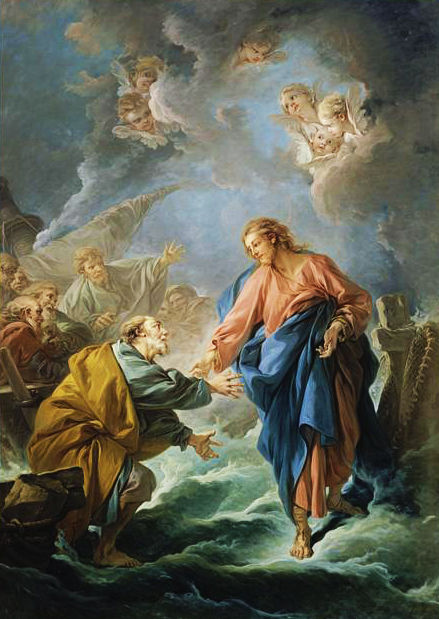
- "Saint Peter Attempting to Walk on Water". François Boucher (1766).
- Book: Gospel of Matthew
- Christian Bible part: New Testament

Matthew 14:28 is a verse in the fourteenth chapter of the Gospel of Matthew in the New Testament.

== Content ==
In the original Greek according to Westcott-Hort, this verse reads:

Ἀποκριθεὶς δὲ αὐτῷ ὁ Πέτρος εἶπε, Κύριε, εἰ σὺ εἶ, κέλευσόν με πρός σε ἐλθεῖν ἐπὶ τὰ ὕδατα.

In the King James Version of the Bible the text reads:

And Peter answered him and said, Lord, if it be thou, bid me come unto thee on the water.

The New International Version translates the passage as:

"Lord, if it's you," Peter replied, "tell me to come to you on the water."

== Analysis ==
There is some question as to whether Peter was in doubt about Jesus' identity. However it generally believed that Peter would have been very familiar with Christ's voice, gesture, and dress, and so when he said, "if it is You", it is a remark of joy, of one who desires to come quickly to Christ, and be near the one he loved above all things. This seems to fit with Peter's next words, which exhibit a faith that believes not only that Christ was walking upon the sea, but that He was able to give the same power to others.

== Commentary from the Church Fathers ==
Jerome: "Whereas He says, It is I, without saying who, either they might be able to understand Him speaking through the darkness of night; or they might know that it was He who had spoken to Moses, Say unto the children of Israel, He that is has sent me unto you. (Exodus 3:14). On every occasion Peter is found to be the one with the most ardent faith. And with the same zeal as ever, so now, while the others are silent, he believes that by the will of his Master he will be able to do that which by nature he cannot do; whence it follows, Peter answered and said unto him, Lord, if it be thou, bid me come unto thee upon the water. As much as to say, Do thou command, and straightway it will become solid; and that body which is in itself heavy will become light."

Augustine: "This I am not able by myself, but in Thee I am able. Peter confessed what he was in himself, and what he should receive from Him by whose will he believed he should be enabled to do that which no human infirmity was equal to."

Chrysostom: "See how great his warmth, how great his faith. He said not, Pray and entreat for me; but Bid me; he believes not only that Christ can Himself walk on the sea, but that He can lead others also thereon; also he wishes to come to Him speedily, and this, so great a thing, he asks not from ostentation, but from love. For he said not, Bid me walk upon the waters, but, Bid me come unto thee. And it seems that having shown in the first miracle that He has power over the sea, He now leads them to a more powerful sign; He saith unto him, Come. And Peter, going forth of the boat, walked on the sea, that he might go to Jesus."

Preceded by Matthew 14:27	Gospel of Matthew; Chapter 14	Succeeded by Matthew 14:29
