= Matthew 14:23 =

- ← 14:22 14:24 →
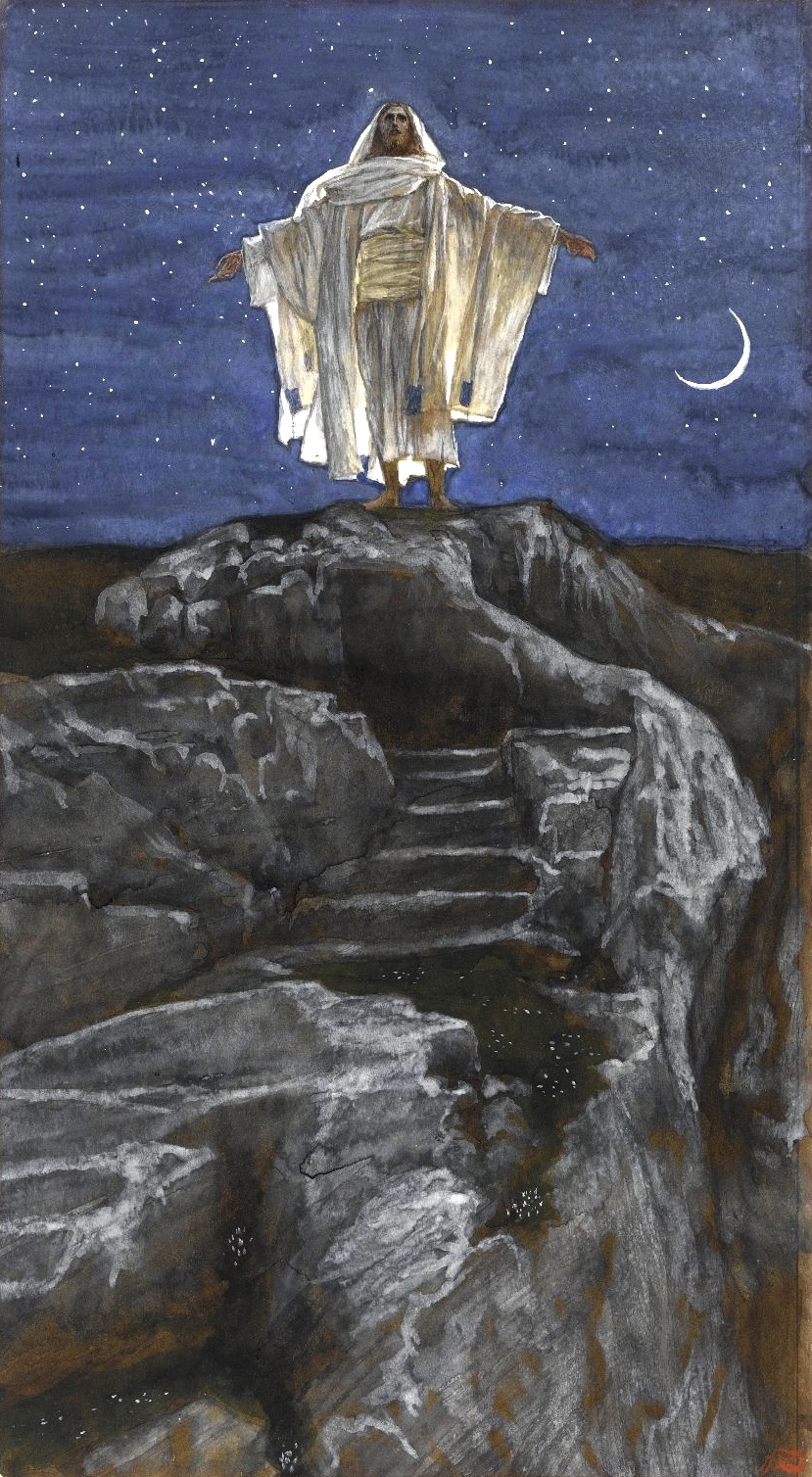
- "Jesus Goes Up Alone onto a Mountain to Pray". James Tissot (1886–1894). Brooklyn Museum
- Book: Gospel of Matthew
- Christian Bible part: New Testament

Matthew 14:23 is a verse in the fourteenth chapter of the Gospel of Matthew in the New Testament.

== Content ==
In the original Greek according to Westcott-Hort this verse reads:

Καὶ ἀπολύσας τοὺς ὄχλους, ἀνέβη εἰς τὸ ὄρος κατ᾿ ἰδίαν προσεύξασθαι· ὀψίας δὲ γενομένης, μόνος ἦν ἐκεῖ.

In the King James Version of the Bible the text reads:

And when he had sent the multitudes away, he went up into a mountain apart to pray: and when the evening was come, he was there alone.

The New International Version translates the passage as:

After he had dismissed them, he went up on a mountainside by himself to pray. When evening came, he was there alone,

== Analysis ==
There are two Hebrew words for evening: the first appears to apply to the previous multiplication of the loaves, just prior, which is early evening, while this appears to be nighttime. The example of Jesus encourages Christians also to take time apart and pray alone.

== Commentary from the Church Fathers ==
Chrysostom: "It should be observed, that when the Lord works a great miracle, He sends the multitudes away, teaching us thereby never to pursue the praise of the multitude, nor to attract them to us. Further, He teaches us that we should not be ever mixed with crowds, nor yet always shunning them; but that both may be done with profit; whence it follows, And when he had sent the multitude away, he went up into a mountain apart to pray; showing us that solitude is good, when we have need to pray to God. For this also He goes into the desert, and there spends the night in prayer, to teach us that for prayer we should seek stillness both in time and place."

Jerome: "That He withdraws to pray alone, you should refer not to Him who fed five thousand on five loaves, but to Him who on hearing of the death of John withdrew into the desert; not that we would separate the Lord’s person into two parts, but that His actions are divided between the God and the man."

Augustine: "This may seem contrary to that Matthew says, that having sent the multitudes away, He went up into a mountain that He might pray alone; and John again says, that it was on a mountain that He fed this same multitude. But since John himself says further, that after that miracle He retired to a mountain that He might not be held by the multitude, who sought to make Him a king, it is clear that He had come down from the mountain when He fed them. Nor do Matthew’s words, He went up into a mountain alone to pray, disagree with this, though John says, When he knew that they would come to make him a king, he withdrew into a mountain himself alone. (John 6:15.) For the cause of His praying is not contrary to the cause of His retiring, for herein the Lord teaches us that we have great cause for prayer when we have cause for flight. Nor, again, is it contrary to this that Matthew says first, that He bade His disciples go into the boat, and then that He sent the multitudes away, and went into a mountain alone to pray; while John relates that He first withdrew to the mountain, and then, when it was late, his disciples went down to the sea, and when they had entered into a boat, &c. for who does not see that John is relating as afterwards done by His disciples what Jesus had commanded before He retired into the mountain?"

Pseudo-Augustine: "Mystically; The mountain is loftiness. But what is higher than the heavens in the world? And Who it was that ascended into heaven, that our faith knows. Why did He ascend alone into heaven? Because no man has ascended into heaven, but He that came down from heaven. For even when He shall come in the end, and shall have exalted us into heaven, He will yet ascend alone, inasmuch as the head with its body is One Christ, and now the head only is ascended. He went up to pray, because He is ascended to make intercession to His Father for us."

Hilary of Poitiers: "Or, that He is alone in the evening, signifies His sorrow at the time of His passion, when the rest were scattered from Him in fear."

Jerome: "Also He ascends into the mountain alone because the multitude cannot follow Him aloft, until He has instructed it by the shore of the sea."

Augustine: "But while Christ prays on high, the boat is tossed with great waves in the deep; and forasmuch as the waves rise, that boat can be tossed; but because Christ prays, it cannot be sunk. Think of that boat as the Church, and the stormy sea as this world."

Hilary of Poitiers: "That He commands His disciples to enter the ship and to go across the sea, while He sends the multitudes away, and after that He goes up into the mountain to pray; He therein bids us to be within the Church, and to be in peril until such time as returning in His splendour He shall give salvation to all the people that shall be remaining of Israel, and shall for give their sins; and having dismissed them into His Father’s kingdom, returning thanks to His Father, He shall sit down in His glory and majesty. Meanwhile the disciples are tossed by the wind and the waves; struggling against all the storms of this world, raised by the opposition of the unclean spirit."

Preceded by Matthew 14:22	Gospel of Matthew; Chapter 14	Succeeded by Matthew 14:24
