= Jesus healing in the land of Gennesaret =

Miracle carried out by Jesus according to the Bible

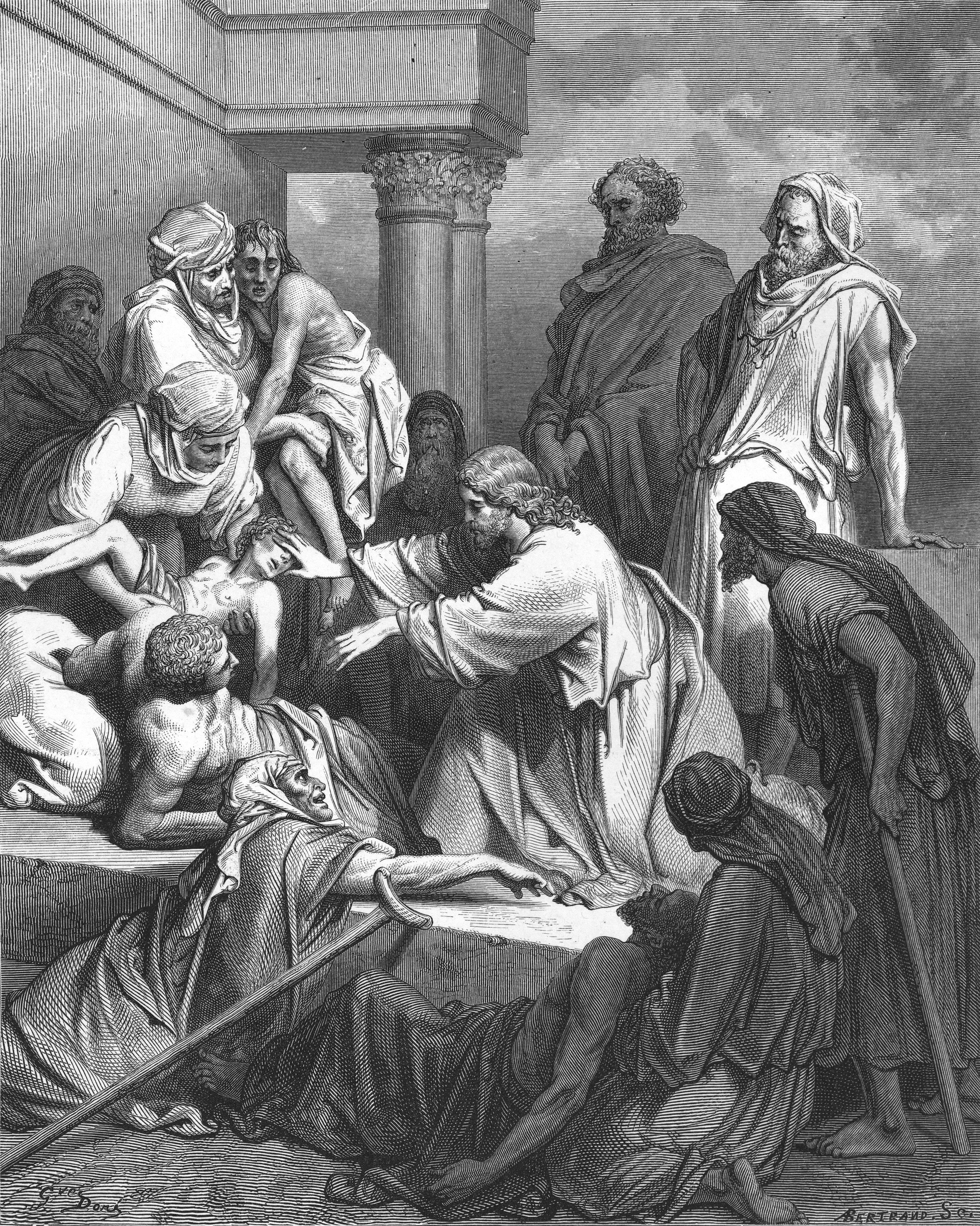
Jesus healing the sick by Gustave Dore (19th century)

According to the Gospel of Mark, as Jesus passes through Gennesaret, just after the account of him walking on water, all those who touch the edge, or hem, or fringe of his cloak are healed:

"When they had crossed over, they landed at Gennesaret and anchored there. As soon as they got out of the boat, people recognized Jesus. They ran throughout that whole region and carried the sick on mats to wherever they heard he was. And wherever he went—into villages, towns or countryside—they placed the sick in the marketplaces. They begged him to let them touch even the edge of his cloak, and all who touched him were healed."

— Mark 6:54-56 NIV

The same account is given in Matthew 14:34-36. In both the gospels, those who were sick aimed to touch the tassels (Greek: κράσπεδον, kraspedon) of Jesus' garments, "which in accordance with Numbers 15:38, the Jew wore on each of the four extremities of his cloak".

First-century historian Flavius Josephus refers to the Gennesaret area as having very rich soil. The town was perhaps halfway between Capernaum and Magdala.

This account is seen by some as a vindication of the reverence paid to relics practiced in the Catholic and Orthodox churches. As John McEvilly notes, this is because Jesus, "far from condemning, as superstitious, the respect and reverence paid to the clothes which He wore, even directly sanctions it, by working miracles in approval of it."

== See also ==
- Life of Jesus in the New Testament
- Ministry of Jesus
- Miracles of Jesus
- Parables of Jesus
