= Codex Tischendorfianus I =

Uncial 0106
- New Testament manuscript
- Name: Codex Tischendorfianus I
- Text: Gospel of Matthew 12-15 †
- Date: 7th-century
- Script: Greek
- Found: Tischendorf / Harris
- Now at: Saint Petersburg, Leipzig, Birmingham, Sinai
- Size: 30 centimetres (12 in) x 22 centimetres (8.7 in))
- Type: mixed text-type
- Category: III
- Hand: elegantly written

Codex Tischendorfianus I, designated as Uncial 0106 (in the Gregory-Aland numbering), ε 40 (Soden), is a Greek uncial manuscript of the New Testament on parchment. It is dated palaeographically to the 7th century. The manuscript is fragmentary.

== Description ==
The codex contains a small part of the Gospel of Matthew 12:17-19.23-25; 13:32; 13:36-15:26 on five elegant parchment leaves (30 centimetres (12 in) by 22 centimetres (8.7 in)). It is written in one column per page, 20 lines per page, in large uncial letters. The writing is elegant, it uses breathings and accents. The letters are leaned into right.

The text is divided according to the κεφαλαια (chapters). There is also another division according to the smaller Ammonian Sections, with references to the Eusebian Canons.

Currently it is dated by the INTF to the 7th century.

The manuscript was brought by Constantin von Tischendorf in 1845 and in 1853 from Sinai. Tischendorf edited its text in Monumenta sacra inedita.

The codex is divided, and located in three places:

- Russian National Library (Gr. 16, 1 f.) in Saint Petersburg — Matt. 12:17-19.23-25
- Universitätsbibliothek (Cod. Gr. 7, 4 ff.), in Leipzig — Matt. 13:46-55 (Leipziger Blätter) brought by Tischendorf from the east in 1845
- Selly Oak College (Mingana Chr. Arab. 93) in Birmingham.

== Uncial 0119 ==
From the same manuscript originated four other leaves now catalogued as Uncial 0119. It was discovered by J. Rendel Harris at Sinai, who examined it. Hermann von Soden designed it as ε 63. It is still housed in the Saint Catherine's Monastery (Sinai Harris 8, 56,8 ff.) on the Sinai peninsula.

The Greek text of this codex is a mixture of text-type. Aland placed it in Category III.

== See also ==
- List of New Testament uncials
- Textual criticism
