= Uncial 073 =

- New Testament manuscript
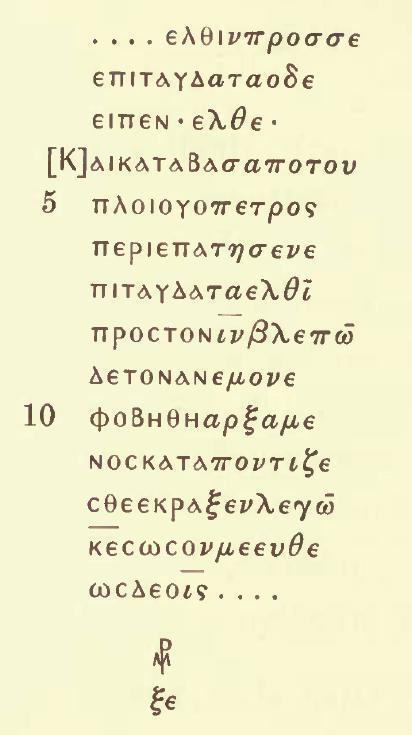
- Matthew 14:28-31
- Text: Matthew
- Date: 6th century
- Script: Greek
- Found: Rendel Harris
- Now at: Sinai Peninsula, Russian National Library
- Cite: J. Rendel Harris, Biblical fragments from Mount Sinai (London, 1890)
- Size: 28 x 23 cm
- Type: Alexandrian text-type
- Category: II

Uncial 073 (in the Gregory-Aland numbering), ε 7 (Soden), is a Greek uncial manuscript of the New Testament, dated palaeographically to the 6th century.

== Description ==
To the present day survived only one leaf of the codex (28 cm by 23 cm). From the same manuscript as 084 (one leaf), ε 24 (von Soden). The text is written in two columns per page, 34 lines per page. There are a few traces of punctuation.

The leaf has survived in a poor condition.

The codex 073 contains a part of the Gospel of Matthew (14:28-31), the codex 084 contains Matthew 14:19-27; 15:2-8.

It has a reference to the Gospel of Mark at the bottom and the number 65 shew that the scribe is giving a number of the Eusebian Canons for the 148 section in Matthew and Mark only.

== Text ==
The Greek text of this codex is a representative of the Alexandrian text-type with some alien readings. Aland placed it in Category II.

In Matthew 14:30 the word ισχυρον is omitted.

== History ==
Rendel Harris dated the manuscript to the 5th century. Currently it is dated by the INTF to the 6th century.

It was found by Rendel Harris, who edited its text. The codex 073 is located now in Saint Catherine's Monastery in the Sinai Peninsula (Sinai Harris 7), and the codex 084 in the Russian National Library (Gr. 277, 1f) in Saint Petersburg.

The text of 073 was collated by Rendel Harris.

== See also ==
- List of New Testament uncials
- Related Bible parts: Matthew 14, Matthew 15
