= J. Rendel Harris =

English biblical scholar

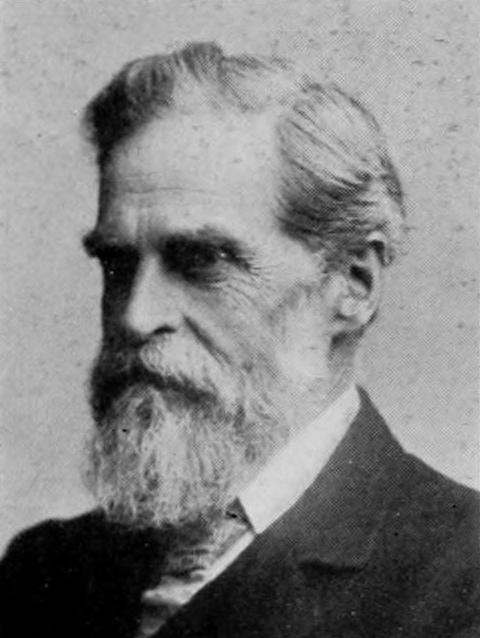
J. Rendel Harris

James Rendel Harris (27 January 1852 in Plymouth, Devon – 1 March 1941) was an English biblical scholar and curator of manuscripts, who was instrumental in bringing back to light many Syriac Scriptures and other early documents. His contacts at the Saint Catherine's Monastery on Mount Sinai in Egypt enabled twin sisters Agnes Smith Lewis and Margaret Dunlop Gibson to discover there the Sinaitic Palimpsest, the oldest Syriac New Testament document in existence. He subsequently accompanied them on a second trip, with Robert Bensly and Francis Crawford Burkitt, to decipher the palimpsest. He himself discovered there other manuscripts (073, 0118, 0119, 0137, a Syriac text of the Apology of Aristides etc.,). Harris's Biblical Fragments from Mount Sinai appeared in 1890. He was a Quaker.

== Life ==
Harris was born to a Congregationalist family and grew up as one of eleven children. His father, Henry Marmaduke Harris, was a house decorator. His mother, Elizabeth Corker Harris, ran a shop selling baby clothes. His paternal aunt, Augusta Harris, was the mother of the poet Henry Austin Dobson.

Educated at Plymouth Grammar School and Clare College, Cambridge, he was third Wrangler in the mathematical Tripos of 1874. He was a fellow of Clare College from 1875 to 1878, in 1892, and from 1902 to 1903. In 1880, he married a Quaker from Plymouth, Helen Balkwill, and under her influence and that of the Evangelical Revival of the 1870s, in 1885 he became a member of the Society of Friends. He moved to the United States in 1882 following his wife who was at the time engaged in missionary work, and was appointed professor of New Testament Greek at Johns Hopkins University in Baltimore, US (1882–1885). Harris resigned his post in response to criticism that his attack on the vivisection practiced in the Johns Hopkins laboratories had elicited from his colleagues (Harris was a staunch vegetarian). The couple returned to Britain for a short while, as Harris was soon appointed professor in Biblical Studies at Haverford College, near Philadelphia (1886–1891).

In 1888–1889, while on leave from Haverford, he travelled to Palestine and Egypt, purchasing 47 rolls and codices written in Hebrew, Latin, Arabic, Syriac, Armenian and Ethiopic. He said that these texts, which discussed biblical and linguistic topics and some of which were as old as the 13th century, were "all acquired by the lawful, though sometimes tedious, processes of Oriental commerce." During this journey, he also discovered the Syriac version of the Apology of Aristides in the Monastery of Saint Catherine. Upon his return, he donated the manuscripts he had collected to Haverford. They are held by the college library's Quaker Collection.

In 1903 he was appointed the first director of studies at the Society of Friends' new college at Woodbrooke near Birmingham. In accepting the post, he turned down an appointment as a professor of theology at Leiden University. However, students from Leiden attended his courses at Woodbrooke. The university later awarded him a doctorate.

Harris represented two prestigious libraries during his lifetime: Johns Hopkins and John Rylands Library, Manchester, where he became the curator of manuscripts. Most of his publications dealt with biblical and patristic history; he was an extremely prolific writer. He examined the Latin text of the Codex Sangallensis 48.

Included among the topics on which he wrote are: the Apology of Aristides (1891), the Didache, Philo, the Diatessaron, the Christian Apologists, Acts of Perpetua, The Odes and Psalms of Solomon (1909), the Gospel of Peter, and other Western and Syriac texts, and numerous works on biblical manuscripts.

In 1933, a Festschrift was published in his honor, called Amicitiae Corolla: a volume of essays presented to James Rendel Harris on the occasion of his 80th birthday.

A new biography of Harris was published in 2018.

== Works ==
- New Testament autographs (1882)
- Notes on Scriveners' "Plain introduction to the criticism of the New Testament," 3rd edition [microform] (1885)
- The Origin of the Leicester Codex of the New Testament. London: C. J. Clay & Sons. 1877.
- Biblical fragments from Mount Sinai (1890)
- The codex Sangallensis (Δ). A Study in the Text of the Old Latin Gospels, (London, 1891).
- Codex Bezae : a study of the so-called Western text of the New Testament (1893)
- Memoranda sacra (1893)
- Stichometry (London 1893).
- Four lectures on the western text of the New Testament (1894)
- The four Gospels in Syriac : transcribed from the Sinaitic Palimpsest (1894)
- Fragments of the commentary of Ephrem Syrus upon the Diatessaron (1895)
- Further researches into the history of the Ferrar-group (1900)
- An early Christian psalter (1909)
- The Odes and Psalms of Solomon (1911)
- Boanerges (1913)
- The origin of the prologue to St. John's Gospel (1917)
- The origin of the doctrine of the Trinity, a popular exposition (1919)

== Archives ==
Archives of James Rendel Harris are held at the Cadbury Research Library, University of Birmingham.
