= Uncial 0118 =

- New Testament manuscript
- Text: Matthew 11:27-28
- Date: 8th-century
- Script: Greek
- Found: Mount Sinai, Rendel Harris
- Now at: Saint Catherine's Monastery
- Cite: J. R. Harris, Biblical Fragments from Mount Sinai (1890)
- Size: 11 x 10 cm
- Type: unknown
- Category: none

Uncial 0118 (in the Gregory-Aland numbering), ε 62 (Soden); is a Greek uncial manuscript of the New Testament, dated paleographically to the 8th century.

== Description ==
The codex contains a small fragment of the Gospel of Matthew 11:27-28, on one parchment leaves (11 cm by 10 cm). It is written in 10 lines per page, in uncial letters. The letters are large and leaned into right; it has breathings and accents.

The text-type of the Greek text of this codex is unknown. Text is too brief to classify. Aland did not placed it in any Category.

ΟΥΔΕ]ΤΟΝ[ΠΡ]Α
ΤΙΣΕΠΙΓΙΝΩΣ
ΚΕΙ.ΕΙΜΗΟΥΣ
ΚΑΙΩΕΑΝΒΟΥ
ΛΗΤΑΙΟΥΣΑ
ΠΟΚΑΛΥ[Ψ]ΑΙ.
ΔΕΥΤΕΠΡΟΣΜΕ
ΠΑΝΤΕΣΟΙΚΟ
ΠΙΩΝΤΕΣΚΑΙ
ΠΕΦΟΡΤΙΣΜΕ

== History ==
Currently it is dated by the INTF to the 8th century.

The codex was found in the end of the 19th century by J. Rendel Harris in the Saint Catherine's Monastery, in Sinai peninsula, where is located to the present day (Sinai Harris 6).

== See also ==
- List of New Testament uncials
- Textual criticism
