= Matthew 14:25 =

- ← 14:24 14:26 →
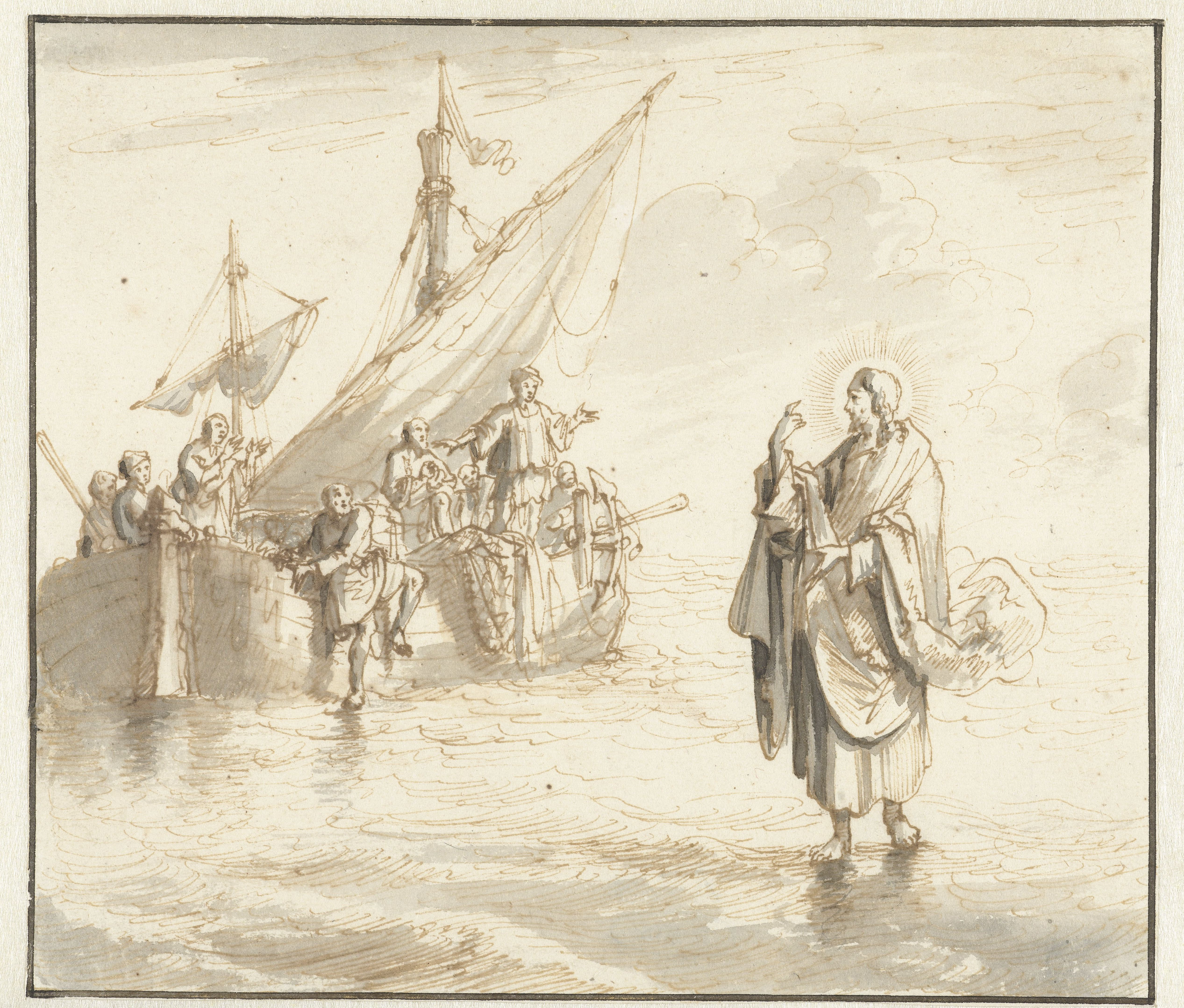
- "Christ Walks on the Water". Jan Luyken (1660-1712).
- Book: Gospel of Matthew
- Christian Bible part: New Testament

Matthew 14:25 is a verse in the fourteenth chapter of the Gospel of Matthew in the New Testament which refers to Jesus walking on water.

== Content ==
In the original Greek according to Westcott-Hort, this verse reads:

Τετάρτῃ δὲ φυλακῇ τῆς νυκτὸς ἀπῆλθε πρὸς αὐτοὺς ὁ Ἰησοῦς, περιπατῶν ἐπὶ τῆς θαλάσσης.

In the King James Version of the Bible, the text reads:

And in the fourth watch of the night Jesus went unto them, walking on the sea.

The New International Version translates the passage as:

During the fourth watch of the night Jesus went out to them, walking on the lake.

== Analysis ==
The fourth watch (Greek: Φυλακῇ) or guard is a word which points to the Romans changing guard every three hours of the night. These were their watches kept in cities and in armies. They changed frequently, for fear a longer watch would give an occasion to sleep. If the night was short, they divided it into three watches. Longer nights were split into four. The fourth watch, then, went from about the tenth hour of the night, until the end of the twelfth. It is said that Christ allowed this long period of tossing by a tempest so that the disciples might be 1. accustomed to endure hardness. 2. might more ardently pray for God's help. 3. more relieved by the calming which Christ was about to do.

== Commentary from the Church Fathers ==
Chrysostom: "But He suffers them to be tossed the whole night, exciting their hearts by fear, and inspiring them with greater desire and more lasting recollection of Him; for this reason He did not stand by them immediately, but as it follows, in the fourth watch of the night he came to them walking upon the sea."

Jerome: "The military guards and watches are divided into portions of three hours each. When then he says that the Lord came to them in the fourth watch, this shows that they had been in danger the whole night."

Augustine: "The Lord came to visit His disciples who are tossed on the sea in the fourth watch of the night—that is, at its close; for each watch consisting of three hours, the night has thus four watches."

Hilary of Poitiers: "The first watch Was therefore of the Law, the second of the Prophets, the third His coming in the flesh, the fourth His return in glory."

Augustine: "Therefore in the fourth watch of the night, that is when the night is nearly ended, He shall come, in the end of the world, when the night of iniquity is past, to judge the quick and the dead. But His coming was with a wonder. The waves swelled, but they were trodden upon. Thus howsoever the powers of this world shall swell themselves, our Head shall crush their head."

Hilary of Poitiers: "But Christ coming in the end shall find His Church wearied, and tossed by the spirit of Anti-Christ, and by the troubles of the world. And because by their long experience of Anti-Christ they will be troubled at every novelty of trial, they shall have fear even at the approach of the Lord, suspecting deceitful appearances. But the good Lord banishes their fear, saying, It is I; and by proof of His presence takes away their dread of impending shipwreck.""

Preceded by Matthew 14:24	Gospel of Matthew; Chapter 14	Succeeded by Matthew 14:26
