= Matthew 14:27 =

- ← 14:26 14:28 →
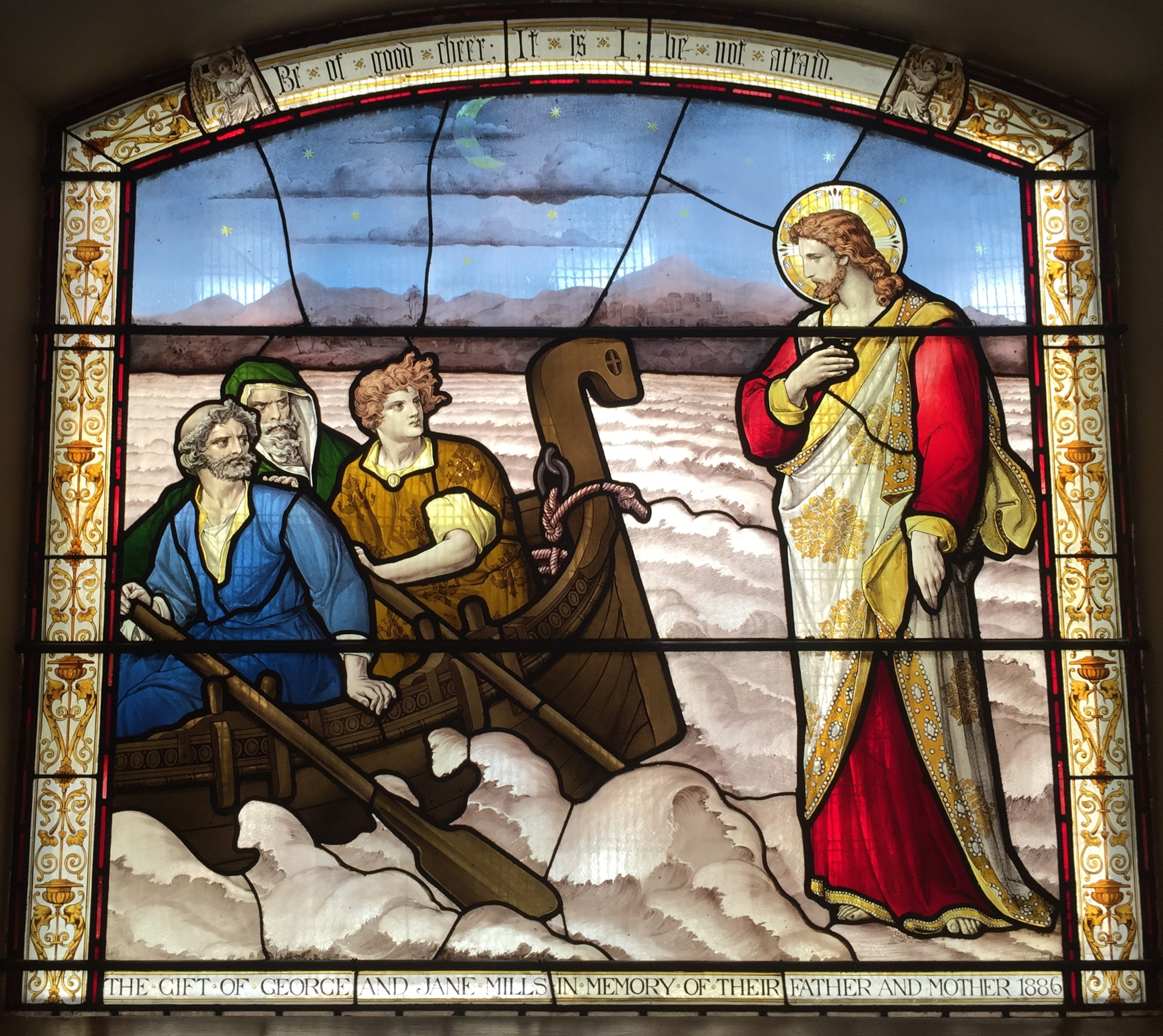
- "Jesus walks on water", St Botolph without Aldersgate. Ward and Hughes, 1886.
- Book: Gospel of Matthew
- Christian Bible part: New Testament

Matthew 14:27 is a verse in the fourteenth chapter of the Gospel of Matthew in the New Testament.

== Content ==
In the original Greek according to Westcott-Hort, this verse is:

Εὐθέως δὲ ἐλάλησεν αὐτοῖς ὁ Ἰησοῦς, λέγων, Θαρσεῖτε· ἐγώ εἰμι· μὴ φοβεῖσθε.

In the King James Version of the Bible the text reads:

But straightway Jesus spake unto them, saying, Be of good cheer; it is I; be not afraid.

The New International Version translates the passage as:

But Jesus immediately said to them: "Take courage! It is I. Don't be afraid."

== Analysis ==
The phrase "it is I" seems to be a reference to Exodus 3:14, "I am who I am". Jesus tells his disciples to take heart, since he is present there is nothing to be afraid of.

== Commentary from the Church Fathers ==
Chrysostom: "Christ then did not reveal Himself to His disciples until they cried out; for the more intense their fear, the more did they rejoice in His presence; whence it follows, And immediately Jesus spoke to them, saying, Be of good cheer, it is I, be not afraid. This speech took away their fear, and prepared their confidence."

Preceded by Matthew 14:26	Gospel of Matthew; Chapter 14	Succeeded by Matthew 14:28
