= Matthew 14:34 =

- ← 14:33 14:35 →
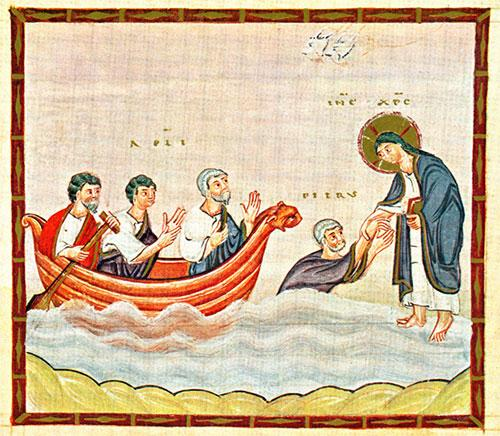
- "Jesus walks on the water" (texts in picture: APOSTOLI, PETRVS, IHC XPC [=Jesus Christ]). Codex Egberti, Fol 27v (980–993).
- Book: Gospel of Matthew
- Christian Bible part: New Testament

Matthew 14:34 is a verse in the fourteenth chapter of the Gospel of Matthew in the New Testament.

== Content ==
In the original Greek according to Westcott-Hort, this verse reads:

Καὶ διαπεράσαντες ἦλθον εἰς τὴν γῆν Γεννησαρέτ.

In the King James Version of the Bible the text reads:

And when they were gone over, they came into the land of Gennesaret.

The New International Version translates the passage as:

When they had crossed over, they landed at Gennesaret.

== Analysis ==
The word "Gennesaret" signifies a flourishing valley. The name of the adjacent Sea of Galilee is lake of Genesaret. Josephus speaks of the region saying, "The country of Genesar extends as far as the lake of the same name. Admirable both for its natural condition and its beauty. In addition to the pleasantness of the climate, it is watered by a most fruitful spring, called by the inhabitants Capharnaum."

== Commentary from the Church Fathers ==
Saint Remigius: "The Evangelist had related above that the Lord had Commanded His disciples to enter the boat, and to go before Him across the strait; he now proceeds with the same intention to relate whither they arrived by their passage, And when they were gone over, they came into the land of Gennezareth."

Rabanus Maurus: "The land of Gennezar, by the lake of Gennezareth, takes its name from a natural power which it is said to have of spontaneously modulating its waters so as to excite a breeze; the Greek words importing, 'creating for itself the breeze'."

== See also ==
- Kinneret (archaeological site)#Etymology for the term "Genneserat"

Preceded by Matthew 14:33	Gospel of Matthew; Chapter 14	Succeeded by Matthew 14:35
