= Tracey Rowland =

Australian Catholic theologian and professor (born 1963)

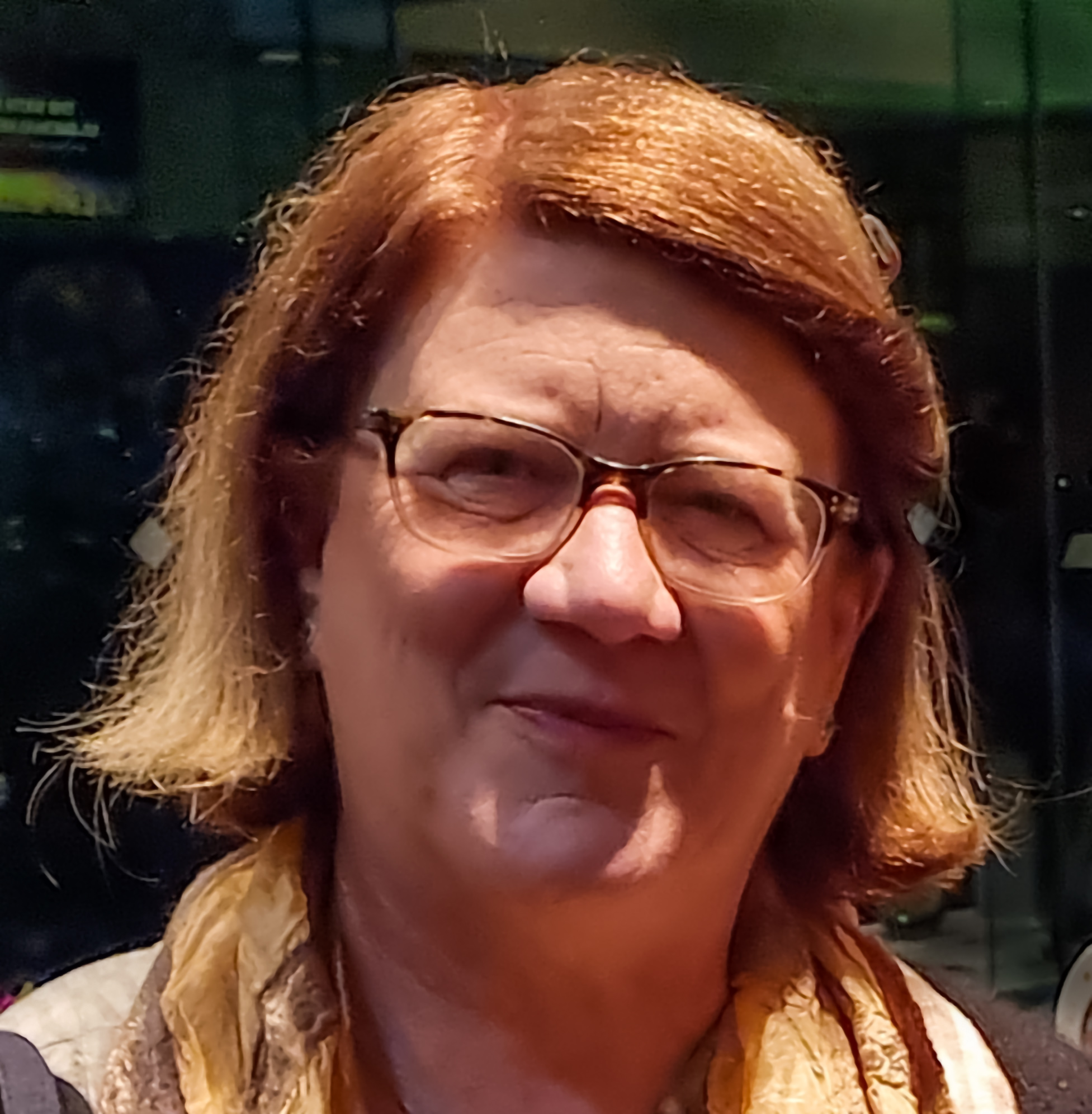
- Rowland in 2023
- Born: 1963 (age 62–63); Ipswich, Queensland
- Education: University of Melbourne; University of Cambridge (Ph.D)
- Occupations: Academic, theologian
- Known for: Appointment to Pope Francis' International Theological Commission in 2014
- Awards: Ratzinger Prize

Tracey Rowland (born 1963) is an Australian Roman Catholic theologian and professor at the University of Notre Dame Australia. She was appointed to Pope Francis' International Theological Commission in 2014 and in 2020 became the first Australian, and third woman, to be awarded the Ratzinger Prize for theology.

== Early life and education ==
Tracey Rowland was born in 1963 in Ipswich, Queensland. She was educated by the Sisters of Mercy in Ipswich, Queensland, and at The Range Convent and High School in Rockhampton. She initially studied law and government at the University of Queensland and earned a Bachelor of Laws in 1989. She then studied at the University of Melbourne, where she obtained a Bachelor of Letters in philosophy and a Master of Arts degree in political philosophy in 1992, as well as a graduate diploma in German language and the Goethe Institute's Certificate of German as a Foreign Language the following year.

After winning a Commonwealth doctoral scholarship Rowland attended the University of Cambridge where she completed her PhD in 2001. Her doctoral dissertation was on twentieth century theological engagements with the idea of culture, with reference to the philosophy of Alasdair MacIntyre and the theology of Henri de Lubac and Joseph Ratzinger.

== Career ==
In 2001 she became the inaugural dean of the Pontifical John Paul II Institute for Studies on Marriage and Family in Melbourne, a role she held until 2017. During this period she continued her theological studies at the Pontifical Lateran University, where she obtained her Licentiate in Sacred Theology and a Doctorate in Sacred Theology. In 2010 she also graduated from the University of London with a degree in education. In 2017, Rowland was appointed as the St John Paul II Research Professor at the University of Notre Dame Australia. She is a dame of the Order of the Holy Sepulchre and a dame of the Order of Knights of the Hospital of Saint John of Jerusalem, Rhodes and Malta, commonly known as the Knights Hospitaller. In 2014 she was appointed as a member of Pope Francis' International Theological Commission. In 2016 she delivered the Cardinal Winning Memorial Lecture at the University of Glasgow in Scotland. In 2020 Rowland won the Ratzinger Prize for Theology, making her the first Australian and only the third woman to ever receive this award. An annual award to two individuals, and coming with AUD$125,000 prize money, Pope Francis announced in October 2020 that Rowland would share the award with French philosopher Jean-Luc Marion.

A reviewer of her second book, Ratzinger's faith, notes that the volume "is an important contribution to understanding not only Ratzinger the theologian but also the Roman Catholic Church after Vatican II--and the challenges and opportunities the church specifically and the Christian faith generally face in the early 21st century". Reviewers of her book Catholic Theology have said that it is "a work which deserves wide readership" and that "we are indebted to Tracey Rowland for this significant theological achievement and valuable teaching resource".

Rowland has published over 150 articles in all and has edited a collection of essays on Anglican patrimony for publication with Bloomsbury, a collection of essays on the subject of healing fractures in fundamental theology (with Peter McGregor) and a book on early to mid-20th-century German theology with a special focus on the mentors of the Ratzinger generation, Illuminating Hope: Defenders of Christian Humanism after Kant and Nietzsche (London: Bloomsbury, 2021).

In 2023 Rowland was appointed to the Pontifical Academy of Social Sciences, an internationally renowned research academy established by Pope John Paul II in 1994. This is a ten-year appointment and Rowland is the second Australian to receive the honour.

== Awards ==
- 2009: Archbishop Michael J Miller Award for the Promotion of Faith and Culture from the University of St. Thomas in Houston
- 2012: Officer's Cross of the Order of Merit of the Republic of Poland
- 2020: Joseph Ratzinger Prize

== Select publications ==
- Rowland, Tracey (26 August 2021), Beyond Kant and Nietzsche : The Munich Defence of Christian Humanism, London Bloomsbury T&T Clark (published 2021), ISBN 978-0-567-70316-3
- Rowland, Tracey (26 April 2019), Portraits of spiritual nobility : chivalry, Christendom, and Catholic culture, Angelico Press (published 2019), ISBN 978-1-62138-447-2
- Rowland, Tracey (26 January 2017), Catholic theology, London Bloomsbury T&T Clark (published 2017), ISBN 978-0-567-65767-1
- Rowland, Tracey (August 2017), The culture of the Incarnation : essays in Catholic theology, Steubenville Emmaus Academic (published 2017), ISBN 978-1-945125-52-2
- Rowland, Tracey (13 May 2010), Benedict XVI : a guide for the perplexed, T & T Clark (published 2010), ISBN 978-0-567-24165-8
- Rowland, Tracey (6 March 2008), Ratzinger's faith : the theology of Pope Benedict XVI, Oxford University Press (published 2008), ISBN 978-0-19-920740-4
- Rowland, Tracey (2003), Culture and the Thomist tradition : after Vatican II, Routledge, ISBN 978-0-415-30527-3
