= Doctor of Biblical Studies =

Doctor of Biblical Studies and Doctor in Bible Exposition (abbreviated DBS, DB or D.B.E ) or Doctor of Sacred Scripture (abbreviated SSD, from Latin Sacrae Scripturae Doctor) is a doctoral-level advanced professional degree in applied theology for practitioners and other individuals who seek to increase knowledge and understanding of biblical and theological principles. Academic as well as ecclesiastical doctoral programs exist that prepare students for the degree of Doctor of Biblical Studies.

== Ecclesiastical studies ==
The doctoral degree is offered by various Pontifical universities. Churches offer doctoral study programs that focus mainly on the preparation of biblical scholars and teachers for service to their individual church, either as seminarians or in colleges, or as pastors of local congregations. These study program are more practically oriented and controlled by faith congregations.
