= Rosemary Goldie =

Australian Roman Catholic theologian (1916–2010)

- Goldie in 1964
- Born: 1 February 1916; Manly, New South Wales, Australia
- Died: 27 February 2010 (aged 94); Randwick, New South Wales, Australia
- Occupation: Roman Catholic theologian
- Known for: undersecretary of the Pontifical Council for the Laity (1967-76); Vatican II female auditor

Rosemary Goldie AO (1 February 1916 – 27 February 2010) was an Australian Catholic theologian.

Goldie was the first woman to serve in an executive role in the Roman Curia; she was undersecretary of the Pontifical Council for the Laity from 1967 until 1976. She also served as an auditor during the Second Vatican Council.

== Career ==
Rosemary Goldie was born in Manly, New South Wales and raised by her maternal grandmother. She attended high school at Our Lady of Mercy College, Parramatta, and later studied arts at the University of Sydney. She gained a scholarship from the French government which allowed her to study at the Sorbonne where she heard Jacques Maritain.

In 1951 she worked at the first First World Congress of the Lay Apostolate and then studied Catholic theology at the academy of the Congregation for the Propagation of the Faith. In 1964 she was one of the first female auditors of the Second Vatican Council.

Pope Paul VI made her undersecretary in the newly created Pontifical Council for the Laity in 1967. When the council became a permanent part of the Roman Curia in December 1976, Goldie took a professorship for pastoral theology at the Pontifical Lateran University continuing there as tutor when she retired from that post. In 1990, Goldie was made an Officer of the Order of Australia for "service to religion and to international relations".

Goldie served under four popes: Paul VI, who described her as "our co-worker"; John XXIII, who described her as la piccinina ("the little one"); the short-lived John Paul I; and John Paul II who visited her in her Vatican office and who received a copy of her autobiography. She knew Benedict XVI during her days in Rome and he visited her in her nursing home in 2008 on the occasion of World Youth Day 2008.

She edited, and wrote an afterword to, the biography of her mother, writer Dulcie Deamer, The Queen of Bohemia (1998, ISBN 0-7022-2726-9) and an autobiography, From a Roman Window (1998, ISBN 1-86371-697-1), about the time of her work for the Vatican. She also provided the English translation of Il Cantico dell'uomo by Franco Biffi about Pietro Cardinal Pavan as Prophet of Our Times – The Social Thought of Cardinal Pietro Pavan (1992, ISBN 1-56548-010-4).

Goldie died at the Little Sisters of the Poor, Randwick, New South Wales, on 27 February 2010, aged 94. Her mother had died there thirty years previously.

In 2018, a new conference room at the Australian embassy to the Holy See was first opened; it is named for Goldie and features a picture of her.
