= Kinneret (archaeological site) =

Bronze/Iron Age city by the Sea of Galilee

Kinneret, Chinnereth
- כִּנֶּרֶת (Hebrew)
- Archaeological site: Tel Kinrot (Modern Hebrew), Tell el-'Oreimeh (Arabic)
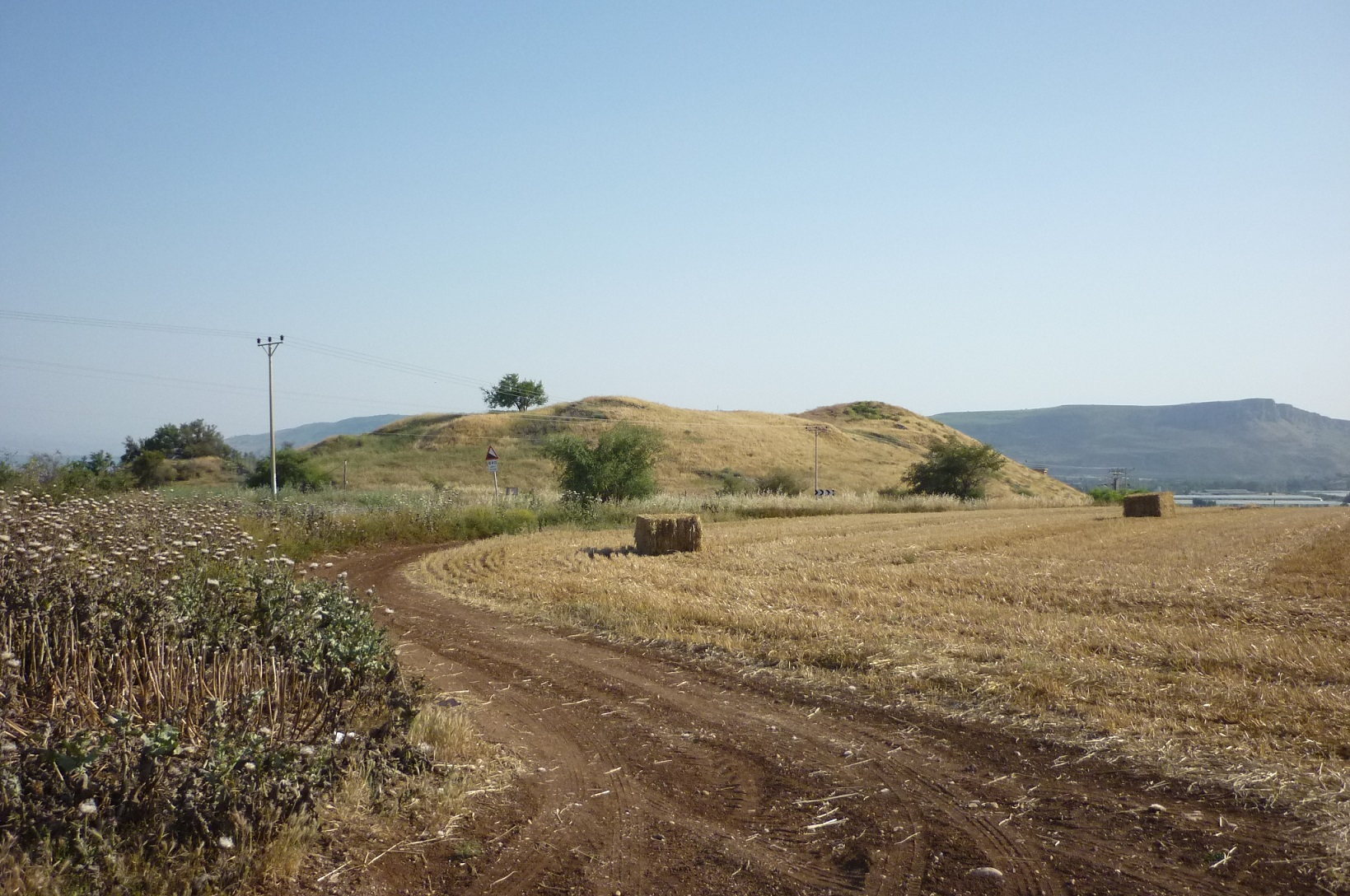
- Tel Kinrot (the mound behind the field) from northwest

- Location within Israel
- 32°51′38″N 35°30′26″E
- Type: Settlement

Kinneret (Hebrew: כִּנֶּרֶת, romanized: Kīnnereṯ) is the name of an important Bronze and Iron Age city of the ancient Levant situated on the northwestern shore of the Sea of Galilee. It was first mentioned in the 14th century BC Tale of Aqhat of Ugarit, and is also mentioned in the Hebrew Bible and the New Testament.

Older Bible translations spell the name alternatively Kinnereth or Chinnereth, and sometimes in the plural as Chinneroth. In time, the Hebrew name became Gennesaret and Ginosar (גִּנֵּיסַר). The remains of Kinneret have been excavated at a site called Tell el-'Oreimeh (Tell el-‘Orēme) in Levantine Arabic and Tel Kinrot in Modern Hebrew.

== Etymology ==
=== "Kinneret" ===
==== "Kinnor" instrument ====
One theory is that Kinneret is derived from kinnor, an ancient Israelite musical instrument, on account of the shape of the lake resembling that of the instrument.

==== Talmud ====
According to the Jerusalem Talmud, Megillah 1:1, the name Kinneret is derived from the name of the kinnar trees which grow in its vicinity, explained by lexicographer Marcus Jastrow to mean the Christsthorn jujube (Ziziphus spina-christi), and by Moses Margolies to mean cane reeds.

=== "Gennesaret" and "Ginosar" ===
Adrian Room sees the origin of 'Ginosar' in a combination of Hebrew words, ge ('valley') and either netser ('branch') or natsor ('to guard', 'to watch').

The late-19th-century Easton's Bible Dictionary offers a very different etymology, by stating that the initial Hebrew name 'Kinneret', in the plural 'Kinnerot', was Hellenized to Gennesaret, with Ginosar an alternative transformation.

=== The lake ===
Due to its prominence, the city gave its name to the lake (the "Sea of Galilee") for long periods of history, as the Sea of Kinneret, Kinnerot, Gennesaret, or Ginosar.

As other places around the lake rose to prominence, such as Tiberias and Qasr al-Minya, the name of the lake also changed to Lake Tiberias or Lake Minya ("Bahr el-Minya" in Arabic).

=== The plain ===
The name has also been used for the "Plain of Gennesaret", which stretches south of the ancient city. The plain's modern names are Plain of Ginosar in Hebrew and el-Ghuweir in Arabic.

=== Modern settlements ===
The Israeli Kibbutz Ginosar derives its name from the ancient town, though it is not located on its precise site. The settlements of Moshavat Kinneret and Kvutzat Kinneret are even further south, on the southwestern shore of the lake.

== History ==
=== Late Bronze Age ===
==== Egyptian period ====
V31 N35 N35 G1 D21 Z1 X1 G43
knnꜣrtw
in hieroglyphs
Era: New Kingdom
(1550–1069 BC)

Kinneret is mentioned as Kennartou (knnꜣrtw) in the 15th-century BCE Annals of Thutmose III at Temple of Karnak.

=== Iron Age ===
According to Sugimoto (2015), the Iron Age IB (tenth to mid-ninth centuries BC) cities in the northeastern region of the Sea of Galilee, including Tel Kinrot, likely reflect the activities of the Kingdom of Geshur, mentioned in the Bible. Also, the later Iron Age IIA–B cities here are linked with the southern expansion of the Aram-Damascus kingdom.

==== Hebrew Bible ====
Kinneret was a town allotted to the tribe of Naphtali (Joshua 19:35). The name appears in the singular form as "Kinneret" (Numbers 34:11, Deuteronomy 3:17) or in the plural as "Kinneroth" (Joshua 11:2, 12:3).

=== Classical Age ===
==== Josephus and Babylonian Talmud ====
Flavius Josephus, as well as the Babylonian Talmud mention the lake by the name "Sea of Ginosar" after the small fertile plain of Ginosar that lies at the foot of Tell el-'Oreimeh, ancient Kinneret. Josephus refers to the area as having very rich soil.

==== New Testament ====
In the New Testament, the name appears changed to Gennesaret (in Matthew 14:34, Mark 6:53 and Luke 5:1; the latter refers to "the Lake of Gennesaret"). In Matthew and Mark, this city or area is a place where Jesus visited and performed healings. In Luke, he taught the crowds "by the Lake of Gennesaret³" and appointed his first four disciples.

The Douay-Rheims Bible uses the form "Genesar" in its translation of Matthew 14:34:

And having passed the water, they came into the country of Genesar.

== Identification and location ==
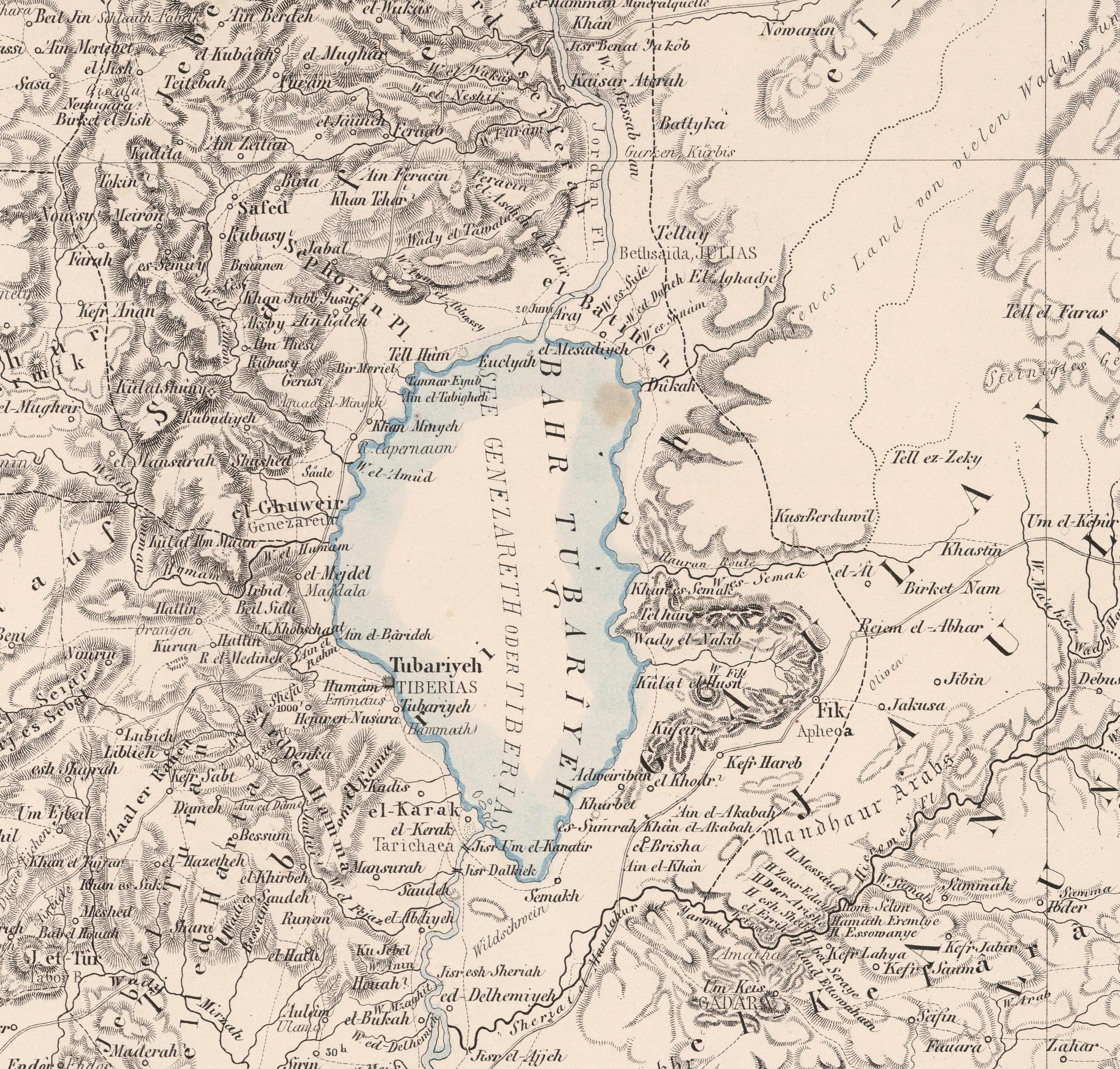
The Plain of Gennesaret marked on an 1850 German map of the Sea of Galilee as "El-Ghuweir / Genezareth" (western shore, stretching from "Khan Minyeh" to "el-Mejdel / Magdala")

The site of the fortified Bronze and Iron Age city of Kinneret is identified with the mound known in Arabic as Tell el-'Oreimeh and in modern Hebrew as Tel Kinrot, halfway between Capernaum and Magdala. Situated on an important trade route, its elevated position meant that it also overlooked and guarded the Plain of Ginosar from its northern end.

The site has the ICS Coordinates: 200805-1252830; ca. 32.87000 N, 35.539312 E.

== Excavations ==
The tell was first explored by Paul Karge in 1911, with a main focus on prehistoric remains. Robert Köppel was the first to excavate (1932 and 1939), but only few results were published.

The premises of the future Mekorot pumping station and a number of spots at the foot of the hill were surveyed in the 1950s by Israeli archaeologists Gershon Edelstein and Bezalel Rabbani (published by Fritz, 1978). In the 1980s, Shan M. M. Winn of the University of Southern Mississippi and Jak Yakar of the University of Tel Aviv cut a small and deep trench near the shore, where they discovered the expected evidence of Early Bronze Age occupation (Winn & Yakar, 1984). Volkmar Fritz of the University of Mainz/Giessen, Germany, then directed the first systematic and continuous excavations: 1982-1985 at the peak ("acropolis"), and in 1995-1999 and 2001 on the lower part of the southeastern slope of the tell (Fritz & Münger, 2002).

In 2002, the Kinneret Regional Project (KRP) took over, continuing the work initiated by Volkmar Fritz on Tel Kinrot, as well as in the wider region around the site (Pakkala, Münger & Zangenberg, 2004). The KRP is jointly run by the Universities of Berne (Switzerland), Helsinki (Finland), Mainz (Germany) and Leiden (Netherlands), and is directed by Stefan Münger, Juha Pakkala and Jürgen Zangenberg. After excavating at Tel Kinrot during five field seasons (2003–2005 and 2007–2008), excavations there have since been "temporarily halted", the KRP team dealing with analysis and publication while continuing the exploration of Horvat Kur and its surroundings.

== See also ==
- Cities in the Book of Joshua
- National Water Carrier, whose Sapir Pumping Station is located at the tell
