= Matthew 14 =

- ← chapter 13 chapter 15 →
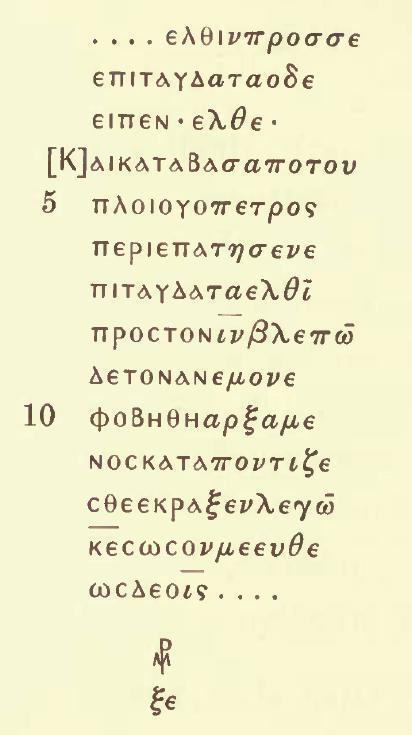
- Gospel of Matthew 14:28–31 on Uncial 073, from 5th or 6th century
- Book: Gospel of Matthew
- Category: Gospel
- Christian Bible part: New Testament
- Order in the Christian part: 1

Matthew 14 is the fourteenth chapter in the Gospel of Matthew in the New Testament section of the Christian Bible. It continues the narrative about Jesus' ministry in Galilee and recounts the circumstances leading to the death of John the Baptist.

== Text ==
The original text was written in Koine Greek. This chapter is divided into 36 verses.

=== Textual witnesses ===
Some early manuscripts containing the text of this chapter are:

- Papyrus 103 (~200; extant verses 3–5)
- Codex Vaticanus (325–350)
- Codex Sinaiticus (330–360)
- Codex Bezae (~400)
- Codex Washingtonianus (~400)
- Codex Ephraemi Rescriptus (~450)
- Codex Purpureus Rossanensis (6th century)
- Codex Petropolitanus Purpureus (6th century; extant verses 1–5, 23–36)
- Codex Sinopensis (6th century; extant verses 1–4, 13–20)

== Structure ==
This chapter can be grouped (with cross references to parallel passages in the other gospels):

- Matthew 14:1–12 = Death of John the Baptist (Mark 6:14–29; Luke 9:7–9)
- Matthew 14:13–21 = Feeding the 5000 (Mark 6:30–44; Luke 9:10–17; John 6:1–13)
- Matthew 14:22–33 = Jesus' walk on water (Mark 6:45–52; John 6:16–21)
- Matthew 14:34–36 = Jesus healing in the land of Gennesaret (Mark 6:53–56).

== The reaction of Herod Antipas (14:1–12) ==
Herod Antipas (Herod the tetrarch) was the son of Herod who was king when Jesus was born (Matthew 2:1) and reigned over Galilee when Jesus performed his ministry in the area (cf. Mark 6:14–29; Luke 9:7–9; 3:19–20). His 'tender conscience over the reluctant execution of John the Baptist made him treating the report of Jesus' miracles with a 'bizarre idea' that Jesus was John who was risen from the dead.

Dale Allison notes the multiple parallels between the Passion of Jesus and the account of John the Baptist in this section.

- Both are captured (14:3; 21:46), bound (14:3; 27:2) and 'suffer the shameful deaths of criminals'.
- Both are executed at the command of a government official (Herod the tetrarch; Pontius Pilate) who 'acts reluctantly at the request of others' (14:6–11; 27:11–26).
- Both are buried by their disciples (14:12; 27:57–61), and in each case opponents fear what the crowds might do because they hold John and Jesus to be prophets (14:5; 21:46).
- Both ends are foreshadowed, as in 2:1–23 (against Herod the Great, the father of Herod the tetrarch); 5:38–42; and 10:17–23, so John's martyrdom (as the forerunner) is a Christological martyrdom prophecy of the coming one (cf. 17:12).
- John has been identified with Elijah (11:14), who in 1 Kings 17–19 accuses King Ahab of misdeeds while the evil Queen Jezebel tries to have him killed (probably applicable to Herod as Ahab and Herodias as Jezebel). In the very next pericope, Jesus suggestively acts like Elisha, Elijah's successor (2 Kings 4:42–44).

=== Verse 12 ===
Then his disciples came and took away the body and buried it, and went and told Jesus.

This is a further mission of John's disciples to Jesus in Galilee, following on from the one reported in Matthew 11. For Ernest Bengel, interpreting the words of Lutheran Pietist Johann Bengel, "the death of their master becomes the means of leading [John's disciples] to Jesus".

== Jesus's withdrawal to a 'deserted place' (14:13–15) ==
Matthew 14:13 and 14:15 refer to a 'deserted' (NKJV) or 'secluded' (Amplified Bible) place, clarified as 'a place where no one lived' in the Easy-to-Read Version. In Luke's gospel, he goes at this point in the narrative to 'a town called Bethsaida', i.e. an inhabited place, but nevertheless one where 'he and his apostles could be alone together.

== Miraculous feeding of a large crowd (14:16–21) ==
Eating together was a symbol of unity and Jesus was acting as the host of a large family gathering, welcoming the crowd into a new community.

=== Verse 19 ===
Then He commanded the multitudes to sit down on the grass. And He took the five loaves and the two fish, and looking up to heaven, He blessed and broke and gave the loaves to the disciples; and the disciples gave to the multitudes.

Looked up to heaven, blessed, broke, and gave indicate a 'communal, liturgical context' which is found in the early church; the same actions are to be seen in the Last Supper in Matthew 26:26.

== Walking on water (14:22–33) ==
After the public miracle of loaves, the disciples witnessed in private one miracle that showed Jesus' authority over material things.

== Jesus the Healer (14:34–36) ==
When they were back in Herod's territory, Jesus' popularity was shown again in his healing ministry, which was more extensive than so far recorded.

== See also ==
- Gennesaret
- Herod Antipas
- Herodias
- John the Baptist
- Miracles of Jesus
- Philip the brother of Herod Antipas
- Sea of Galilee
- Tzitzit
- Related Bible parts: Numbers 15, Matthew 15, Mark 6, Mark 8, Luke 9, John 6

== Sources ==
- Coogan, Michael David (2007). Coogan, Michael David; Brettler, Marc Zvi; Newsom, Carol Ann; Perkins, Pheme (eds.). The New Oxford Annotated Bible with the Apocryphal/Deuterocanonical Books: New Revised Standard Version, Issue 48 (Augmented 3rd ed.). Oxford University Press. ISBN 9780195288810.
- France, R. T. (1994). "Matthew". In Carson, D. A.; France, R. T.; Motyer, J. A.; Wenham, G. J. (eds.). New Bible Commentary: 21st Century Edition (4, illustrated, reprint, revised ed.). Inter-Varsity Press. pp. 904–945. ISBN 9780851106489.
