= Early Greek New Testament manuscripts =

Greek copies of New Testament texts

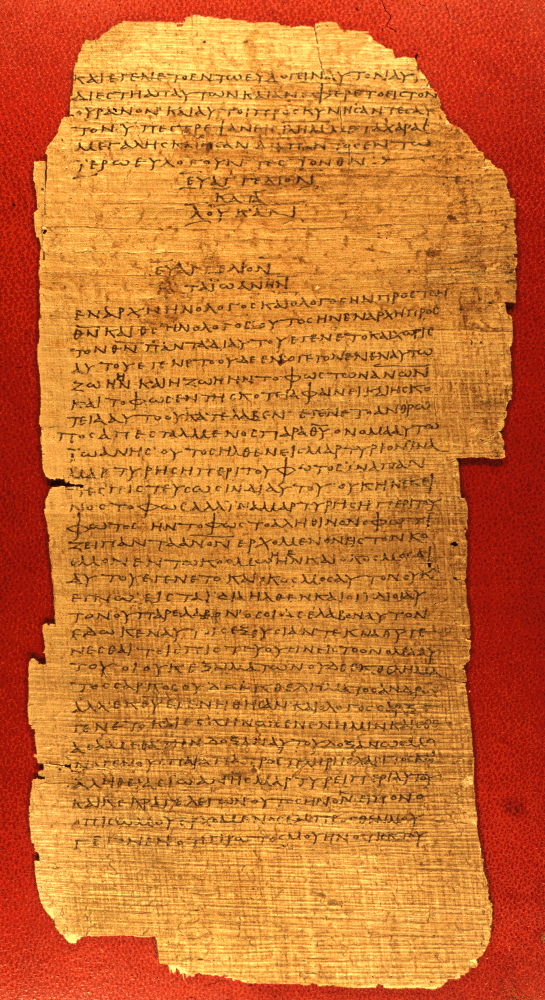
Papyrus Bodmer XIV–XV – one of the best-preserved early New Testament manuscripts

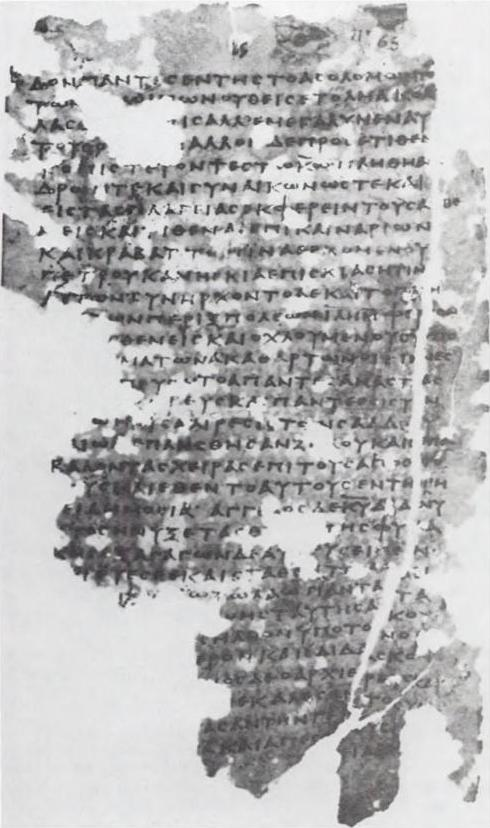
Uncial 0189, the oldest New Testament manuscript on parchment; written in biblical uncial script

Early Greek New Testament manuscripts refer to manuscripts of the New Testament created before the year 300. This date is approximate, as manuscripts from that period are not dated, and their dating is estimated based on archaeological, paleographic, and other criteria. No manuscript from the first century has survived. The manuscripts are written in uncial script in several of its styles, and a significant number of them were produced by non-professional scribes.

Until the end of the 19th century, no early New Testament manuscripts were known; today, however, they are important witnesses to its text. Most manuscripts have survived in a fragmentary state. Almost all are written on papyrus, and almost all originate from Egypt.

== Description and general characteristics ==
The early New Testament manuscripts are those created before the year 300. This date is approximate, as manuscripts from that period bear no dates, and their age is estimated based on archaeological and paleographic criteria, the evolution of abbreviations, textual-critical analysis, and other factors. This date is not accidental, since the way manuscripts were produced changed radically first after the persecution under Diocletian (303–305), and later after the legalization of Christianity by Constantine the Great. Examples of manuscripts produced after this period include the Codex Sinaiticus and the Codex Vaticanus. In the absence of manuscripts from the late first century, the early New Testament manuscripts known today date from the years from between 100 and 300. Philip Comfort, in the second edition of The Text of the Earliest New Testament Greek Manuscripts (2001), lists 69 early Greek New Testament manuscripts. Since then, papyri 𝔓^{118}, 𝔓^{119}, and 𝔓^{121} have been discovered.

Manuscripts from the second century are referred to as the earliest Greek New Testament manuscripts. The 27th edition of Novum Testamentum Graece (Nestle–Aland, NA^{27}) dates only four manuscripts to the second century: 𝔓^{52}, 𝔓^{90}, 𝔓^{98}, and 𝔓^{104}. Several others are dated to around the year 200: 𝔓^{32}, 𝔓^{46}, 𝔓^{64}, 𝔓^{66}, 𝔓^{75}, 𝔓^{77}, 𝔓^{87}, 𝔓^{98}, 𝔓^{103}, 𝔓^{104}, and 𝔓^{109}. Comfort and other American paleographers extend this list with several additional manuscripts.

Although paleographers make great efforts to identify the earliest possible manuscripts, no New Testament manuscripts from the first century have yet been discovered. Some paleographers (Thiede, O'Callaghan) have suggested that 7Q4, 7Q5, 𝔓^{46}, 𝔓^{52}, and 𝔓^{64+67} could be first–century New Testament manuscripts. 7Q4 and 7Q5 undoubtedly date from the first century; however, these fragments do not transmit any New Testament text (7Q4 has been identified as a fragment of 1 Enoch 103). The remaining manuscripts are dated to the second century by the most recognized paleographers.

Manuscripts from this period represent the text of the New Testament belonging to the Alexandrian, Caesarean, or Western text-types, with varying degrees of deviation from them. The Byzantine text-type is not represented at all among manuscripts from this era. Most manuscripts of this category were discovered in the 20th century.

All manuscripts from the first half of the second century are very fragmentary and of limited usefulness for textual criticism. Only toward the end of the second century do manuscripts appear that contain almost entire or large portions of New Testament books (such as the papyri from the Bodmer and Chester Beatty collections). A significant number of preserved manuscripts originate from Oxyrhynchus.

Certain similarities have been observed between some early New Testament manuscripts and Jewish manuscripts from the pre-Christian era. A shared feature is the use of an enlarged initial at the beginning of a book or a new section. The initial is often preceded by a small space to highlight the beginning of a new passage. Lines are emphasized by large spacing. These features are not found in classical Greek literature. It is also suggested that the use of nomina sacra in abbreviated form may have been influenced by the Tetragrammaton. According to another hypothesis, the nomina sacra were modeled on imperial titles and the titles of imperial officials.

== Style and character of writing ==
Paleographers distinguish four types of handwriting, depending on the level of training of the scribe's hand:

- Common hand – the writer had no training in copying documents; this type is most often represented by an inelegant cursive.
- Documentary hand – the scribe had some experience in preparing documents but little in copying them; the handwriting is variable. Many official scribes from state administration wrote in this style.
- Reformed documentary hand – the scribe had experience in preparing and copying documents; the handwriting is uniform, though the copies were not fully professional.
- Professional hand – the highest level of professionalism; copies include marginal notes, pagination, and numbered stichoi. According to Diocletian's edict of 301, a scribe was to receive 25 denarii for 100 lines (stichoi) of text of the highest quality, and 20 denarii for 100 lines of lower-quality text. Uncial 𝔓^{46} was produced by a professional scribe.

Among early New Testament manuscripts, three main styles of writing are distinguished: Roman uncial, biblical uncial, and rounded uncial. Roman uncial is characterized by some strokes in letters being thicker or thinner, with some letters decorated. Uncial 𝔓^{46} is written in this style.

Some manuscripts are written in uncial script with features not found in non-biblical manuscripts. The letters are large and square, each stroke is made separately, letters are never connected, and there are no ligatures. This style of writing is called biblical uncial. Manuscripts written in biblical uncial include 𝔓^{4}, 𝔓^{30}, 𝔓^{35}, 𝔓^{39}, 𝔓^{40}, 𝔓^{64}, 𝔓^{70}, 𝔓^{95}, 0162, and 0189. Biblical uncial evolved from Roman uncial and differs in that it has little to no decoration.

Some manuscripts are written in a rounded uncial style, similar to the uncial of the late Ptolemaic period. This style is represented by many well-known manuscripts, such as P. Oxy. 802, Fouad 266, 7Q1, and 7Q5, dated from around 100 BCE to 150 CE. Among New Testament papyri, this style is found in 𝔓^{32}, 𝔓^{66}, 𝔓^{90}, and 𝔓^{104}. Additionally, some manuscripts are written with broad or narrow letters, with oval curves or other distinctive features, but these do not form a consistently repeating set of characteristics. Such manuscripts are classified as mixed style (Formal Mixed – Turner) or strict style (Strenge Stil – Schubart).

== Dating ==
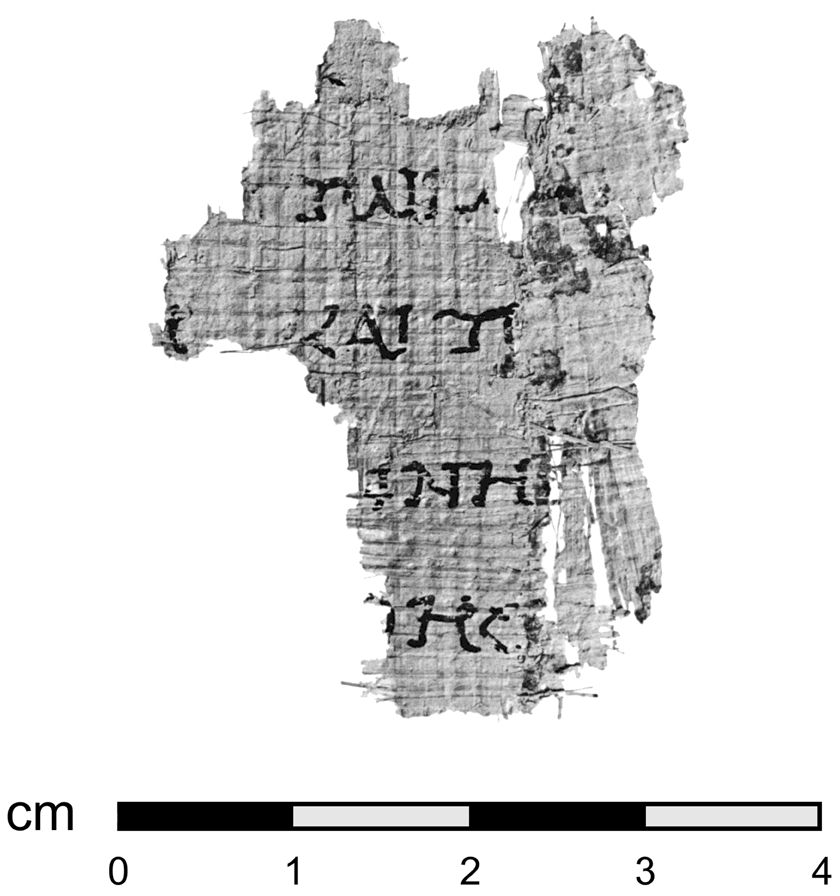
7Q5 – it has been suggested that this is the oldest surviving fragment of the Gospel of Mark

Although the dating of manuscripts is generally approximate, in some cases archaeological data from the place of discovery or other external evidence allows for more precise dating (terminus ante quem, terminus post quem). For manuscripts found in Herculaneum, the year 79 serves as the terminus ante quem; for the Qumran manuscripts, the year 68; and for the manuscript 0212 found in Dura-Europos, the latest possible date is 256 or 257. If a scroll contains two different texts on both sides, and the text on the verso is dated to around 185 CE, the text on the recto must be earlier. However, determining exactly how much earlier is not possible. Conversely, establishing the date of the earlier text (recto) only provides a terminus post quem for the later text (verso). A manuscript also cannot be dated earlier than the creation of the literary work it contains (terminus post quem).

Most manuscripts cannot be dated based on archaeological criteria, so comparative paleography is used. The handwriting style of manuscripts is compared with those whose dates have been precisely established.

In many cases, the official date of a manuscript is the date determined by the publisher of its text (editio princeps), which is sometimes confirmed by other paleographers but often disputed. Nevertheless, in many cases the official date of the manuscript remains that assigned by the publisher. As paleography has developed, knowledge about manuscripts has evolved. Until the end of the 19th century, it was widely believed that Christians did not use codices before the 4th century. For this reason, Grenfell and Hunt did not date Christian papyrus codices earlier than the 3rd century, even when the handwriting style indicated the late 1st or early 2nd century.

The name ΙΗΣΟΥΣ (Jesus) is abbreviated in three ways: ΙΗ, ΙΣ, and ΙΗΣ. The oldest form is considered to be ΙΗ, as it was known to the author of the Epistle of Barnabas, who used it to interpret the Old Testament text Genesis 14:14 (ΙΗ + Τ = 318). This abbreviation is used in 𝔓^{18}, 𝔓^{45}, P. Egerton 2, 0212, P. Oxy. 1224, and P. Oxy. 2070.

The name ΧΡΙΣΤΟΣ (Christ) is also abbreviated in three ways: ΧΣ, ΧΡΣ, and ΧΡ. The least frequently used form is ΧΡ, while the longest form is characteristic of the 3rd century.

== Bibliography ==
- Comfort, Philip Wesley (2005). Encountering the Manuscripts: An Introduction to New Testament Paleography & Textual Criticism. Nashville, Tennessee: Broadman & Holman Publishers. ISBN 978-0-8054-3145-2. OCLC 62252205.
- Comfort, Philip Wesley; Barrett, David P. (2001). The Text of the Earliest New Testament Greek Manuscripts. Wheaton, Illinois: Tyndale House Publishers Incorporated. ISBN 978-0-8423-5265-9. OCLC 45023548.
