= Matthew 14:14 =

- ← 14:13 14:15 →
- Book: Gospel of Matthew
- Christian Bible part: New Testament

Matthew 14:14 is the fourteenth verse in the fourteenth chapter of the Gospel of Matthew in the New Testament.

== Content ==
In the original Greek according to Westcott-Hort, this verse reads:

Καὶ ἐξελθὼν ὁ Ἰησοῦς εἶδε πολὺν ὄχλον, καὶ ἐσπλαγχνίσθη ἐπ᾿ αὐτούς, καὶ ἐθεράπευσε τοὺς ἀρρώστους αὐτῶν.

In the King James Version of the Bible the text reads:

And Jesus went forth, and saw a great multitude, and was moved with compassion toward them, and he healed their sick.

The New International Version (NIV) translates the passage as:

When Jesus landed and saw a large crowd, he had compassion on them and healed their sick.

== Analysis ==
The Greek ἐξελθὼν (going forth) does not state where Christ is coming from. It could be either the desert, or from Mount Tabor where he went with his disciples or merely the boat on which he traveled, which the NIV assumes ("landed"). Mark 6:34 notes that the people were "as sheep without a shepherd".

== Commentary from the Church Fathers ==
Chrysostom: "And they immediately reap the reward of this; for it follows, And he went out and saw a great multitude, and he had compassion upon them, and healed their sick. For though great was the affection of those who had left their cities, and sought Him carefully, yet the things that were done by Him surpassed the reward of any zeal. Therefore he assigns compassion as the cause of this healing. And it is great compassion to heal all, and not to require faith."

Hilary of Poitiers: "Mystically; The Word of God, on the close of the Law, entered the ship, that is, the Church; and departed into the desert, that is, leaving to walk with Israel, He passes into breasts void of Divine knowledge. The multitude learning this, follows the Lord out of the city into the desert, going, that is, from the Synagogue to the Church. The Lord sees them, and has compassion upon them, and heals all sickness and infirmity, that is, He cleanses their obstructed minds, and unbelieving hearts for the understanding of the new preaching."

Jerome: "It is to be observed moreover, that when the Lord came into the desert, great crowds followed Him; for before He went into the wilderness of the Gentiles, He was worshipped by only one people. They leave their cities, that is, their former conversation, and various dogmas. That Jesus went out, shows that the multitudes had the will to go, but not the strength to attain, therefore the Saviour departs out of His place and goes to meet them."

Preceded by Matthew 14:13	Gospel of Matthew; Chapter 14	Succeeded by Matthew 14:15
