= Matthew 14:9–11 =

Matthew 14:9-11
- ← 14:8 14:12 →
- Book: Gospel of Matthew
- Christian Bible part: New Testament

Matthew 14:9-11 are verses in the fourteenth chapter of the Gospel of Matthew in the New Testament.

== Content ==
In the original Greek according to Westcott-Hort, these verses read:

9:Καὶ ἐλυπήθη ὁ βασιλεύς, διὰ δὲ τοὺς ὅρκους καὶ τοὺς συνανακειμένους ἐκέλευσε δοθῆναι·
10:καὶ πέμψας ἀπεκεφάλισε τὸν Ἰωάννην ἐν τῇ φυλακῇ.
11:Καὶ ἠνέχθη ἡ κεφαλὴ αὐτοῦ ἐπὶ πίνακι, καὶ ἐδόθη τῷ κορασίῳ· καὶ ἤνεγκε τῇ μητρὶ αὐτῆς.

In the King James Version of the Bible the text reads:

9:And the king was sorry: nevertheless for the oath’s sake, and them which sat with him at meat, he commanded it to be given her.
10:And he sent, and beheaded John in the prison.
11:And his head was brought in a charger, and given to the damsel: and she brought it to her mother.

The New International Version translates the passage as:

9:The king was distressed, but because of his oaths and his dinner guests, he ordered that her request be granted
10:and had John beheaded in the prison.
11:His head was brought in on a platter and given to the girl, who carried it to her mother.

== Analysis ==
Although Herod initially put John in prison, it seems that owing to his sanctity and virtue he was willing to listen to him (Mark 6:20). There appears to be no virtue in keeping an impious oath.

== Commentary from the Church Fathers ==
Jerome: "Otherwise; It is the manner of Scripture to speak of events as they were commonly viewed at the time by all. So Joseph is called by Mary herself the father of Jesus; so here Herod is said to be sorry, because the guests believed that he was so. This dissembler of his own inclinations, this contriver of a murder displayed sorrow in his face, when he had joy in his mind. For his oath’s sake, and them which sat with him at meat, he commanded it to be given. He excuses his crime by his oath, that his wickedness might be done under a pretence of piety. That he adds, and them that sat at meat with him, he would have them all sharers in his crime, that a bloody dish might be brought in in a luxurious feast."

Chrysostom: "If he was afraid to have so many witnesses of his perjury, how much more ought he to have feared so many witnesses of a murder?"

Saint Remigius: "Here is a less sin done for the sake of another greater; he would not extinguish his lustful desires, and therefore he betakes him to luxurious living; he would not put any restraint on his luxury, and thus he passes to the guilt of murder; for, He sent and beheaded John in prison, and his head was brought in a charger."

Jerome: "We read in Roman history, that Flaminius, a Roman general, sitting at supper with his mistress, on her saying that she had never seen a man beheaded, gave permission that a man under sentence for a capital crime should be brought in and beheaded during the entertainment. For this he was expelled the senate by the censors, because he had mingled feasting with blood, and had employed death, though of a criminal, for the amusement of another, causing murder and enjoyment to be joined together. How much more wicked Herod, and Herodias, and the damsel who danced; she asked as her bloody reward the head of a Prophet, that she might have in her power the tongue that reproved the unlawful nuptials."

Gregory the Great: " But not without most deep wonder do I consider, that he who in his mother’s womb was filled with the spirit of prophecy, than whom there arose not a greater among them that are born of women, is cast into prison by wicked men, and is beheaded because of the dancing of a girl, and that a man of such severe life dies for the sport of shameful men. Are we to think that there was any thing in his life which this so shameful death should wipe away? God thus oppresses His people in the least things, because He sees how He may reward them in the highest things. And hence may be gathered what they will suffer whom He casts away, if He thus tortures those He loves."

Gregory the Great: " And John is not sought out to suffer concerning the confession of Christ, but for the truth of righteousness. But because Christ is truth, he goes to death for Christ in going for truth. It follows, And his disciples came, and took up his body, and buried it."

Preceded by Matthew 14:8	Gospel of Matthew; Chapter 14	Succeeded by Matthew 14:12
