= Papyrus Palau-Ribes 163 =

The Papyrus Palau-Ribes 163 (No. 869 according to Rahlfs; [pəˈlaw ˈri.βes]) is a fragment of a papyrus codex from the 3rd or 4th century CE. It measures 4.7 cm × 3.8 cm (1.9 in × 1.5 in) and contains parts of the Book of Esther 4:4–8:11, in Ancient Greek (Septuagint). It is one of the oldest extant record of the Book of Esther in Greek and among the thirty oldest known documents of the Septuagint.

Its source is unknown. The fragment was purchased in the 1960s by José O’Callaghan and stored in the Seminary for Papyrology of the Theological Faculty of Sant Cugat del Vallès. When the seminary was dissolved in 1983 the papyrus remained with José O’Callaghan until his death in 2001. Since then it has remained in the historical archive of the Jesuits in Catalonia at the Arxiu Històric de la Companyia de Jesús a Catalunya in Barcelona, under the reference number Palau-Ribes 163.

== Commentaries ==
- S. Daris: Papiri Palau Ribes. In: Aegyptus 66, 1986, p. 106–107.
- José O’Callaghan: Ester 4,4–5.8–11. in: Papiros Literarios Griegos del Fondo Palau-Ribes (P. PalauRib. Lit). Vol I. Institut de Teologia Fonamental, Barcelona 1993, No. 4.
