= Matthew 14:5 =

- ← 14:4 14:6 →
- Book: Gospel of Matthew
- Christian Bible part: New Testament

Matthew 14:5 is the fifth verse in the fourteenth chapter of the Gospel of Matthew in the New Testament.

== Content ==
In the original Greek according to Westcott-Hort, this verse is:

Καὶ θέλων αὐτὸν ἀποκτεῖναι, ἐφοβήθη τὸν ὄχλον, ὅτι ὡς προφήτην αὐτὸν εἶχον.

In the King James Version of the Bible the text reads:

And when he would have put him to death, he feared the multitude, because they counted him as a prophet.

The New International Version translates the passage as:

Herod wanted to kill John, but he was afraid of the people, because they considered him a prophet.

== Analysis ==
Seeing that the people held John as a prophet, Herod held back his passion, even though his wife undoubtedly would have moved him otherwise. Still from Mark 6:20, we find that Herod very much respected John's virtue and holiness.

== Commentary from the Church Fathers ==
Jerome: "He feared a disturbance among the people for John’s sake, for he knew that multitudes had been baptized by him in Jordan; but he was overcome by love of his wife, which had already made him neglect the commands of. God."

Glossa Ordinaria: "The fear of God amends us, the fear of man torments us, but alters not our will; it rather renders us more impatient to sin as it has held us back for a time from our indulgence."

| Preceded by Matthew 14:4 | Gospel of Matthew; Chapter 14 | Succeeded by Matthew 14:6 |
