= Matthew 14:6–7 =

Matthew 14:6-7
- ← 14:5 14:8 →
- Book: Gospel of Matthew
- Christian Bible part: New Testament

Matthew 14:6-7 is a set of verses in the fourteenth chapter of the Gospel of Matthew in the New Testament.

== Content ==
In the original Greek according to Westcott-Hort these verses read:

6:Γενεσίων δὲ ἀγομένων τοῦ Ἡρῴδου, ὠρχήσατο ἡ θυγάτηρ τῆς Ἡρῳδιάδος ἐν τῷ μέσῳ, καὶ ἤρεσε τῷ Ἡρῴδῃ·
7:ὅθεν μεθ᾿ ὅρκου ὡμολόγησεν αὐτῇ δοῦναι ὃ ἐὰν αἰτήσηται.

In the King James Version of the Bible the text reads:

6:But when Herod’s birthday was kept, the daughter of Herodias danced before them, and pleased Herod.
7:Whereupon he promised with an oath to give her whatsoever she would ask.

The New International Version translates the passage as:

6:On Herod's birthday the daughter of Herodias danced for them and pleased Herod so much
7:that he promised with an oath to give her whatever she asked.

== Analysis ==
Herod's birthday serves as the convenient day (see Mark 6:21) for Herodias' plan to do away with John. Allowing dancing during feasts at that time was a sign of wantonness. Mark also adds that Herod promised up to "half his kingdom" to the girl.

== Commentary from the Church Fathers ==
Glossa Ordinaria: "The Evangelist having related John’s imprisonment, proceeds to his putting to death, saying, But on Herod’s birthday, the daughter of Herodias danced in the midst."

Jerome: "We find no others keeping their birthday besides Herod and Pharaoh, that they who were alike in their wickedness might be alike in their festivities."

Saint Remigius: "It should be known that it is customary not for rich only but for poor mothers also, to educate their daughters so chastely, that they are scarce so much as seen by strangers. But this unchaste woman had so brought up her daughter after the same manner, that she had taught her not chastity but dancing. Nor is Herod to be less blamed who forgot that his was a royal palace, but this woman made it a theatre; And it pleased Herod, so that he swore with an oath that he would give her whatsoever she should ask of him."

Jerome: "I do not excuse Herod that he committed this murder against his will by reason of his oath, for perhaps he took the oath for the very purpose of bringing about the murder. But if he says that he did it for his oath’s sake, had she asked the death of her mother, or her father, would he have granted it or not? What then he would have refused in his own person, he ought to have rejected in that of the Prophet."

Preceded by Matthew 14:5	Gospel of Matthew; Chapter 14	Succeeded by Matthew 14:8
