= Matthew 14:8 =

- ← 14:7 14:9 →
- Book: Gospel of Matthew
- Christian Bible part: New Testament

Matthew 14:8 is the eighth verse in the fourteenth chapter of the Gospel of Matthew in the New Testament.

== Content ==
In the original Greek according to Westcott-Hort, this verse is:

Ἡ δέ, προβιβασθεῖσα ὑπὸ τῆς μητρὸς αὐτῆς, Δός μοι, φησίν, ὧδε ἐπὶ πίνακι τὴν κεφαλὴν Ἰωάννου τοῦ βαπτιστοῦ.

In the King James Version of the Bible, the text reads:

And she, being before instructed of her mother, said, Give me here John Baptist’s head in a charger.

The New International Version translates the passage as:

Prompted by her mother, she said, "Give me here on a platter the head of John the Baptist."

== Analysis ==
Being prompted by her mother, the girl demands immediately the head of John the Baptist for fear that Herod will repent of the promise he has made.

== Commentary from the Church Fathers ==
Isidore of Seville. "In evil promises then break faith. That promise is impious which must be kept by crime; that oath is not to be observed by which we have unwittingly pledged ourselves to evil. It follows, And she being before instructed of her mother said, Give me here John Baptist's head in a charger."

Jerome: "We read in Roman history that Flaminius, a Roman general, sitting at supper with his mistress, on her saying that she had never seen a man beheaded, gave permission that a man under sentence for a capital crime should be brought in and beheaded during the entertainment. For this he was expelled the senate by the censors, because he had mingled feasting with blood, and had employed death, though of a criminal, for the amusement of another, causing murder and enjoyment to be joined together. How much more wicked Herod, and Herodias, and the damsel who danced; she asked as her bloody reward the head of a Prophet, that she might have in her power the tongue that reproved the unlawful nuptials."

Jerome: "For Herodias, fearing that Herod might some time recover his senses, and be reconciled to his brother, and dissolve their unlawful union by a divorce, instructs her daughter to ask at once at the banquet the head of John, a reward of blood worthy of the deed of the dancing."

Chrysostom: "Here is a twofold accusation against the damsel, that she danced, and that she chose to ask an execution as her reward. Observe how Herod is at once cruel and yielding; he obliges himself by an oath, and leaves her free to choose her request. Yet when he knew what evil was resulting from her request, he was grieved, And the king was sorry, for virtue gains praise and admiration even among the bad."

Preceded by Matthew 14:7	Gospel of Matthew; Chapter 14	Succeeded by Matthew 14:9
