= Matthew 14:1 =

- ← 13:36 14:2 →
- Book: Gospel of Matthew
- Christian Bible part: New Testament

Matthew 14:1 is the first verse in the fourteenth chapter of the Gospel of Matthew in the New Testament.

== Content ==
In the original Greek according to Westcott-Hort, this verse is:

Ἐν ἐκείνῳ τῷ καιρῷ ἤκουσεν Ἡρῴδης ὁ τετράρχης τὴν ἀκοὴν Ἰησοῦ,

In the King James Version of the Bible the text reads:

At that time Herod the tetrarch heard of the fame of Jesus,

The New International Version translates the passage as:

At that time Herod the tetrarch heard the reports about Jesus,

== Analysis ==
Herod Antipas was the son of Herod the Great, who had killed the innocent children. The "tetrarch" refers to the fact that he ruled one-fourth of the kingdom of the Jews. He was appointed by the Romans. Some commentators speculate as to why Herod did not learn of Jesus until later in his ministry. A possible reason seems to be such a harsh ruler's lack of interest in religious affairs and the war against Aretas, king of Arabia, which likely occupied his attention.

== Commentary from the Church Fathers ==
Glossa Ordinaria: "The Evangelist had above shown the Pharisees speaking falsely against Christ’s miracles, and just now His fellow-citizens wondering, yet despising Him; he now relates what opinion Herod had formed concerning Christ on hearing of His miracles, and says, At that time Herod the tetrarch heard the fame of Jesus."

Chrysostom: "It is not without reason that the Evangelist here specifies the time, but that you may understand the pride and carelessness of the tyrant; inasmuch as he had not at the first made himself acquainted with the things concerning Christ, but now only after long time. Thus they, who in authority are fenced about with much pomp, learn these things slowly, because they do not much regard them."

Augustine: "Matthew says, At that time, not, On that day, or, In that same hour; for Mark relates the same circumstances, but not in the same order. He places this after the mission of the disciples to preach, though not implying that it necessarily follows there; any more than Luke, who follows the same order as Mark."

Preceded by Matthew 13	Gospel of Matthew; Chapter 14	Succeeded by Matthew 14:2
