= Matthew 14:2 =

- ← 14:1 14:3 →
- Book: Gospel of Matthew
- Christian Bible part: New Testament

Matthew 14:2 is the second verse in the fourteenth chapter of the Gospel of Matthew in the New Testament.

== Content ==
In the original Greek according to Westcott-Hort, this verse is:

καὶ εἶπε τοῖς παισὶν αὐτοῦ, Οὗτός ἐστιν Ἰωάννης ὁ βαπτιστής· αὐτὸς ἠγέρθη ἀπὸ τῶν νεκρῶν, καὶ διὰ τοῦτο αἱ δυνάμεις ἐνεργοῦσιν ἐν αὐτῷ.

In the King James Version of the Bible the text reads:

And said unto his servants, This is John the Baptist; he is risen from the dead; and therefore mighty works do shew forth themselves in him.

The New International Version translates the passage as:

and he said to his attendants, "This is John the Baptist; he has risen from the dead! That is why miraculous powers are at work in him."

== Analysis ==
It is unclear what is behind Herod's belief that John the Baptist may have come back to life. It could be that he was aware of the examples from the Old Testament (3 Kings 17, 4 Kings 13 and 4 Kings 4), or perhaps he believed the common Greek understanding propagated by Pythagoras that the souls of the just were permitted to enter other bodies. He may have believed that John was now more powerful having come back from the dead and could now do these "might works."

== Commentary from the Church Fathers ==
Chrysostom: "Observe how great a thing is virtue; Herod fears John even after he is dead, and philosophizes concerning the resurrection; as it follows; And he saith to his servants, This is John the Baptist, he is risen from the dead, and therefore mighty works are wrought in him."

Rabanus Maurus: "From this place we may learn how great the jealousy of the Jews was; that John could have risen from the dead, Herod, an alien-born, here declares, without any witness that he had risen: concerning Christ, whom the Prophets had foretold, the Jews preferred to believe, that He had not risen, but had been carried away by stealth. This intimates that the Gentile heart is more disposed to belief than that of the Jews."

Jerome: "One of the Ecclesiastical interpreters asks what caused Herod to think that John was risen from the dead; as though we had to account for the errors of an alien, or as though the heresy of metempsychosis was at all supported by this place—a heresy which teaches that souls pass through various bodies after a long period of years—for the Lord was thirty years old when John was beheaded."

Rabanus Maurus: "All men have well thought concerning the power of the resurrection, that the saints shall have greater power after they have risen from the dead, than they had while they were yet weighed down with the infirmity of the flesh; wherefore Herod says, Therefore mighty works are wrought in him."

Augustine: " Luke’s words are, John have I beheaded: who is he of whom I hear such things? (Luke 9:9.) As Luke has thus represented Herod as in doubt, we must understand rather that he was afterwards convinced of that which was commonly said—or we must take what he here says to his servants as expressing a doubt—for they admit of either of these acceptations."

Saint Remigius: "Perhaps some one may ask how it can be here said, At that time Herod heard, seeing that we have long before read that Herod was dead, and that on that the Lord returned out of Egypt. This question is answered, if we remember that there were two Herods. On the death of the first Herod, his son Archelaus succeeded him, and after ten years was sent into exile to Vienne in Gaul. Then Cæsar Augustus gave command that the kingdom should be divided into tetrarchies, and gave three parts to the sons of Herod. This Herod then who beheaded John is the son of that greater Herod under whom the Lord was born; and this is confirmed by the Evangelist adding the tetrarch."

Glossa Ordinaria: " Having mentioned this supposition of John’s resurrection, because he had never yet spoken of his death, he now returns, and narrates how it came to pass."

Preceded by Matthew 14:1	Gospel of Matthew; Chapter 14	Succeeded by Matthew 14:3
