= Matthew 14:12 =

- ← 14:11 14:13 →
- Book: Gospel of Matthew
- Christian Bible part: New Testament

Matthew 14:12 is the twelfth verse in the fourteenth chapter of the Gospel of Matthew in the New Testament. It refers to the death of John the Baptist and the burial of his body.

== Content ==
In the original Greek according to Westcott-Hort, this verse is:

Καὶ προσελθόντες οἱ μαθηταὶ αὐτοῦ ἦραν τὸ σῶμα, καὶ ἔθαψαν αὐτό· καὶ ἐλθόντες ἀπήγγειλαν τῷ Ἰησοῦ.

In the King James Version of the Bible, the text reads:

And his disciples came, and took up the body, and buried it, and went and told Jesus.

Although the Greek text refers to "οἱ μαθηταὶ αὐτοῦ", ("his disciples"), the New International Version adds John's name, translating the passage as:

John's disciples came and took his body and buried it. Then they went and told Jesus.

== Analysis ==
Robert Witham and John McEvilly both note that John's disciples seemingly had access to the prison where he was executed, known from the writings of the historian Josephus to have been Machaerus prison, or some influence to obtain the body.

== Commentary from the Church Fathers ==
Glossa Ordinaria: "The Evangelist having related John’s imprisonment, proceeds to his putting to death, saying, But on Herod’s birthday, the daughter of Herodias danced in the midst."

Jerome: "We find no others keeping their birthday besides Herod and Pharaoh, that they who were alike in their wickedness might be alike in their festivities."

Saint Remigius: "It should be known that it is customary not for rich only but for poor mothers also, to educate their daughters so chastely, that they are scarce so much as seen by strangers. But this unchaste woman had so brought up her daughter after the same manner, that she had taught her not chastity but dancing. Nor is Herod to be less blamed who forgot that his was a royal palace, but this woman made it a theatre; And it pleased Herod, so that he swore with an oath that he would give her whatsoever she should ask of him."

Jerome: "I do not excuse Herod that he committed this murder against his will by reason of his oath, for perhaps he took the oath for the very purpose of bringing about the murder. But if he says that he did it for his oath’s sake, had she asked the death of her mother, or her father, would he have granted it or not? What then he would have refused in his own person, he ought to have rejected in that of the Prophet."

Isidore of Seville: "In evil promises then break faith. That promise is impious which must be kept by crime; that oath is not to be observed by which we have unwittingly pledged ourselves to evil. It follows, And she being before instructed of her mother said, Give me here John Baptist’s head in a charger."

Jerome: "For Herodias, fearing that Herod might some time recover his senses, and be reconciled to his brother, and dissolve their unlawful union by a divorce, instructs her daughter to ask at once at the banquet the head of John, a reward of blood worthy of the deed of the dancing."

Chrysostom: "Here is a twofold accusation against the damsel, that she danced, and that she chose to ask an execution as her reward. Observe how Herod is at once cruel and yielding; he obliges himself by an oath, and leaves her free to choose her request. Yet when he knew what evil was resulting from her request, he was grieved, And the king was sorry, for virtue gains praise and admiration even among the bad."

Jerome: "Otherwise; It is the manner of Scripture to speak of events as they were commonly viewed at the time by all. So Joseph is called by Mary herself the father of Jesus; so here Herod is said to be sorry, because the guests believed that he was so. This dissembler of his own inclinations, this contriver of a murder displayed sorrow in his face, when he had joy in his mind. For his oath’s sake, and them which sat with him at meat, he commanded it to be given. He excuses his crime by his oath, that his wickedness might be done under a pretence of piety. That he adds, and them that sat at meat with him, he would have them all sharers in his crime, that a bloody dish might be brought in in a luxurious feast."

Chrysostom: "If he was afraid to have so many witnesses of his perjury, how much more ought he to have feared so many witnesses of a murder?"

Saint Remigius: "Here is a less sin done for the sake of another greater; he would not extinguish his lustful desires, and therefore he betakes him to luxurious living; he would not put any restraint on his luxury, and thus he passes to the guilt of murder; for, He sent and beheaded John in prison, and his head was brought in a charger."

Gregory the Great: "But not without most deep wonder do I consider, that he who in his mother’s womb was filled with the spirit of prophecy, than whom there arose not a greater among them that are born of women, is cast into prison by wicked men, and is beheaded because of the dancing of a girl, and that a man of such severe life dies for the sport of shameful men. Are we to think that there was any thing in his life which this so shameful death should wipe away? God thus oppresses His people in the least things, because He sees how He may reward them in the highest things. And hence may be gathered what they will suffer whom He casts away, if He thus tortures those He loves."

Gregory the Great: "And John is not sought out to suffer concerning the confession of Christ, but for the truth of righteousness. But because Christ is truth, he goes to death for Christ in going for truth. It follows, And his disciples came, and took up his body, and buried it."

Jerome: "By which we may understand both the disciples of John himself, and of the Saviour."

Rabanus Maurus: "Josephus relates, that John was sent bound to the castle of Mecheron, and there beheaded; but ecclesiastical history relates that he was buried in Sebastia, a town of Palestine, which was formerly called Samaria."

Chrysostom: "Observe how John’s disciples are henceforth more attached to Jesus; they it is who told Him what was done concerning John; And they came and told Jesus. For leaving all they take refuge with Him, and so by degrees after their calamity, and the answer given by Christ, they are set right."

Hilary of Poitiers: "Mystically, John represents the Law; for the Law preached Christ, and John came of the Law, preaching Christ out of the Law. Herod is the Prince of the people, and the Prince of the people bears the name and the cause of the whole body put under him. John then warned Herod that he should not take to him his brother’s wife. For there are and there were two people, of the circumcision, and of the Gentiles; and these are brethren, children of the same parent of the human race, but the Law warned Israel that he should not take to him the works of the Gentiles and unbelief which was united to them as by the bond of conjugal love. On the birthday, that is amidst the enjoyments of the things of the body, the daughter of Herodias danced; for pleasure, as it were springing from unbelief, was carried in its alluring course throughout the whole of Israel, and the nation bound itself thereto as by an oath, for sin and worldly pleasures the Israelites sold the gifts of eternal life. She (Pleasure), at the suggestion of her mother Unbelief, begged that there should be given her the head of John, that is, the glory of the Law; but the people knowing the good that was in the Law, yielded these terms to pleasure, not without sorrow for its own danger, conscious that it ought not to have given up so great glory of its teachers. But forced by its sins, as by the force of an oath, as well as overcome by the fear, and corrupted by the example of the neighbouring princes, it sorrowfully yields to the blandishments of pleasure. So among the other gratifications of a debauched people the head of John is brought in in a dish, that is by the loss of the Law, the pleasures of the body, and worldly luxury is increased. It is carried by the damsel to her mother; thus depraved Israel offered up the glory of the Law to pleasure and unbelief. The times of the Law being expired, and buried with John, his disciples declare what is done to the Lord, coming, that is, to the Gospels from the Law."

Rabanus Maurus: "Otherwise; Even at this day we see that in the head of the Prophet John the Jews have lost Christ, who is the head of the Prophets."

Jerome: "And the Prophet has lost among them both tongue and voice."

Saint Remigius: "Otherwise; The beheading of John marks the increase of that fame which Christ has among the people, as the exaltation of the Lord upon the cross marks the progress of the faith; whence John had said, He must increase, but I must decrease. (John 3:30.)"

| Preceded by Matthew 14:11 | Gospel of Matthew; Chapter 14 | Succeeded by Matthew 14:13 |
