= Matthew 14:4 =

- ← 14:3 14:5 →
- Book: Gospel of Matthew
- Christian Bible part: New Testament

Matthew 14:4 is the fourth verse in the fourteenth chapter of the Gospel of Matthew in the New Testament.

== Content ==
In the original Greek according to Westcott-Hort, this verse is:

Ἔλεγε γὰρ αὐτῷ ὁ Ἰωάννης, Οὐκ ἔξεστί σοι ἔχειν αὐτήν.

In the King James Version of the Bible the text reads:

For John said unto him, It is not lawful for thee to have her.

The New International Version translates the passage as:

for John had been saying to him: "It is not lawful for you to have her."

== Analysis ==
John fearlessly confronted Herod, likely knowing it would seal his fate. In Luke 3:19 we find that John also reproved Herod for other crimes.

== Commentary from the Church Fathers ==
Jerome: "The old history tells us, that Philip the son of Herod the greater, the brother of this Herod, had taken to wife Herodias daughter of Aretas, king of the Arabs; and that he, the father-in-law, having afterwards cause of quarrel with his son-in-law, took away his daughter, and to grieve her husband gave her in marriage to his enemy Herod. John the Baptist therefore, who came in the spirit and power of Elias, with the same authority that he had exerted over Ahab and Jezebel, rebuked Herod and Herodias, because that they had entered into unlawful wedlock; it being unlawful while the own brother yet lives to take his wife. He preferred to endanger himself with the King, than to be forgetful of the commandments of God in commending himself to him."

Chrysostom: "Yet he speaks not to the woman but to the husband, as he was the chief person."

Glossa Ordinaria: "And perhaps he observed the Jewish Law, according to which John forbade him this adultery. And desiring to kill him, he feared the people."

Preceded by Matthew 14:3	Gospel of Matthew; Chapter 14	Succeeded by Matthew 14:5
