= List of manuscripts from Qumran Cave 7 =

List of the manuscripts from Qumran Cave 7
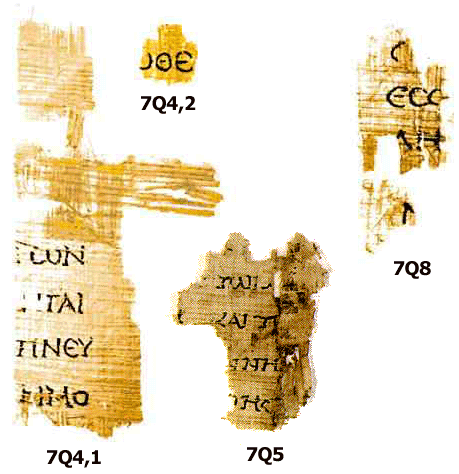
- Dead Sea Scroll fragments 7Q4, 7Q5, and 7Q8 from Cave 7 in Qumran, written on papyrus
- Material: Parchment, papyrus
- Writing: Greek
- Created: Est. 408 BCE to 318 CE
- Discovered: 1952–56
- Present location: Qumran

The following is a list of the Dead Sea Scrolls from the cave 7 near Qumran.

== Description ==
Wadi Qumran Cave 7 yielded fewer than 20 fragments of Greek documents, including 7Q2 (the "Letter of Jeremiah" = Baruch 6), 7Q5 (which became the subject of much speculation in later decades), and a Greek copy of a scroll of Enoch. Cave 7 also produced several inscribed potsherds and jars.

== List of manuscripts ==
Some resources for more complete information on the Dead Sea Scrolls are the book by Emanuel Tov, "Revised Lists of the Texts from the Judaean Desert" for a complete list of all of the Dead Sea Scroll texts, as well as the online webpages for the Shrine of the Book and the Leon Levy Collection, both of which present photographs and images of the scrolls and fragments themselves for closer study. Information is not always comprehensive, as content for many scrolls has not yet been fully published.

Fragment or scroll identifier	Fragment or scroll name	Alternative identifier	English Bible Association	Language	Date/script	Description	Reference
Qumran Cave 7
7QpapLXXExod	Exodus	7Q1	Exodus 28:4–7	Greek	Hasmonean	Greek fragment of Exodus	
7QpapEpJer	Letter of Jeremiah	7Q2	Letter of Jeremiah verses 43–44	Greek	Hasmonean	Epistle of Jeremiah. On papyrus.	
7Q3	Unidentified	7Q3		Greek	Herodian	Unknown biblical text	
7Q4	Unidentified	7Q4		Greek	Hasmonean	Unknown biblical text	
7Q5	Unidentified	7Q5		Greek	Herodian	Unknown biblical text. Believed by some to be Mark 6:52–53	
7Q6–18	Unidentified	7Q6–18		Greek	Hellenistic-Roman; Herodian	Very tiny unidentified fragments written on papyrus	
7Q papImprint	Unidentified	7Q19		Greek	Herodian	Unidentified papyrus imprint. Very tiny fragments written on papyrus	

== See also ==
- Biblical manuscripts
- Septuagint manuscripts
- List of Hebrew Bible manuscripts

== Sources ==
- Fitzmyer, Joseph A. (2008). A Guide to the Dead Sea Scrolls and Related Literature. Grand Rapids, MI: William B. Eerdmans Publishing Company. ISBN 9780802862419.
