= Matthew 14:15-21 =

- ← 14:14 14:22 →
- Book: Gospel of Matthew
- Christian Bible part: New Testament

Matthew 14:15-21 is a set of verses in the fourteenth chapter of the Gospel of Matthew in the New Testament.

== Content ==
In the original Greek according to Westcott-Hort, these verses read:

15:Ὀψίας δὲ γενομένης, προσῆλθον αὐτῷ οἱ μαθηταὶ αὐτοῦ, λέγοντες, Ἔρημός ἐστιν ὁ τόπος, καὶ ἡ ὥρα ἤδη παρῆλθεν· ἀπόλυσον τοὺς ὄχλους, ἵνα ἀπελθόντες εἰς τὰς κώμας ἀγοράσωσιν ἑαυτοῖς βρώματα.
16:Ὁ δὲ Ἰησοῦς εἶπεν αὐτοῖς, Οὐ χρείαν ἔχουσιν ἀπελθεῖν· δότε αὐτοῖς ὑμεῖς φαγεῖν.
17:Οἱ δὲ λέγουσιν αὐτῷ, Οὐκ ἔχομεν ὧδε εἰ μὴ πέντε ἄρτους καὶ δύο ἰχθύας.
18:Ὁ δὲ εἶπε, Φέρετέ μοι αὐτοὺς ὧδε.
19:Καὶ κελεύσας τοὺς ὄχλους ἀνακλιθῆναι ἐπὶ τοὺς χόρτους, καὶ λαβὼν τοὺς πέντε ἄρτους καὶ τοὺς δύο ἰχθύας, ἀναβλέψας εἰς τὸν οὐρανόν, εὐλόγησε, καὶ κλάσας ἔδωκε τοῖς μαθηταῖς τοὺς ἄρτους, οἱ δὲ μαθηταὶ τοῖς ὄχλοις.
20:Καὶ ἔφαγον πάντες, καὶ ἐχορτάσθησαν· καὶ ἦραν τὸ περισσεῦον τῶν κλασμάτων, δώδεκα κοφίνους πλήρεις.
21:Οἱ δὲ ἐσθίοντες ἦσαν ἄνδρες ὡσεὶ πεντακισχίλιοι, χωρὶς γυναικῶν καὶ παιδίων.

In the King James Version of the Bible the text reads:

15:And when it was evening, his disciples came to him, saying, This is a desert place, and the time is now past; send the multitude away, that they may go into the villages, and buy themselves victuals.
16:But Jesus said unto them, They need not depart; give ye them to eat.
17:And they say unto him, We have here but five loaves, and two fishes.
18:He said, Bring them hither to me.
19:And he commanded the multitude to sit down on the grass, and took the five loaves, and the two fishes, and looking up to heaven, he blessed, and brake, and gave the loaves to his disciples, and the disciples to the multitude.
20:And they did all eat, and were filled: and they took up of the fragments that remained twelve baskets full.
21:And they that had eaten were about five thousand men, beside women and children.

The New International Version translates the passage as:

15:As evening approached, the disciples came to him and said, "This is a remote place, and it's already getting late. Send the crowds away, so they can go to the villages and buy themselves some food."
16:Jesus replied, "They do not need to go away. You give them something to eat."
17:"We have here only five loaves of bread and two fish," they answered.
18:"Bring them here to me," he said.
19:And he directed the people to sit down on the grass. Taking the five loaves and the two fish and looking up to heaven, he gave thanks and broke the loaves. Then he gave them to the disciples, and the disciples gave them to the people.
20:They all ate and were satisfied, and the disciples picked up twelve basketfuls of broken pieces that were left over.
21:The number of those who ate was about five thousand men, besides women and children.

== Analysis ==
In verse 15, Hebrew has two words for evening. The first for when the sun began to decline which is the case here (see Luke 9:12) or at night. John 6:5 implies that Jesus spoke verse 16 to Philip, perhaps because he was most familiar with the region. He looks to Philip to verify that to feed so many would be impossible, by human standards. Jesus further confirms it would be impossible by asking what they had on hand. It appears that although Jesus worked the miracle it partly occurred by his hands, by those of the apostles, and by those of people who received them. The miracle being worked in the dividing of the substance rather than new bread and fish being created from nothing. To verify the miracle the left-overs are gathered and counted. It is said that Christ here teaches by this action, that bread and riches, both corporeal and spiritual, are not diminished by being given away, but are multiplied a hundred and a thousandfold.

== Related Stories ==
St. Lidwina of Holland, was famous for her patience and love. And even though she was poor herself, diligently gave to the poor. She had only a few small coins in her purse, and these she was always giving away, but others were supplied from heaven in their place, so that they never failed, but only increased, and so her purse came to be called the Jesus purse. This story is often told in respect to 2 Cor. 9:6., "He that sows sparingly, shall reap also sparingly: and whoever sows generously will also reap generously."

== Commentary from the Church Fathers ==
Chrysostom: "It is a proof of the faith of these multitudes that they endured hunger in waiting for the Lord even till evening; to which purpose it follows, And when it was evening, his disciples came unto him, saying, This is a desert place, and the time is now past. The Lord purposing to feed them waits to be asked, as always not stepping forward first to do miracles, but when called upon. None out of the crowd approached Him, both because they stood in great awe of Him, and because in their zeal of love they did not feel their hunger. But even the disciples do not come and say, Give them to eat; for the disciples were as yet in an imperfect condition; but they say, This is a desert place. So that what was proverbial among the Jews to express a miracle, as it is said, Can he spread a table in the wilderness? (Ps. 78:19.) this also He shows among his other works. For this cause also He leads them out into the desert, that the miracle might be clear of all suspicion, and that none might suppose that any thing was supplied towards the feast from any neighbouring town. But though the place be desert, yet is He there who feeds the world; and though the hour is, as they say, past, yet He who now commanded was not subjected to hours. And though the Lord had gone before His disciples in healing many sick, yet they were so imperfect that they could not judge what He would do concerning food for them, wherefore they add, Send the multitude away, that they may go into the towns, and buy themselves food. Observe the wisdom of the Master; He says not straightway to them, ‘I will give them to eat;’ for they would not easily have received this, but, Jesus said unto them, They need not depart, Give ye them to eat."

Jerome: "Wherein He calls the Apostles to breaking of bread, that the greatness of the miracle might be more evident by their testimony that they had none."

Augustine: " It may perplex some how, if the Lord, according to the relation of John, asked Philip whence bread was to be found for them, that can be true which Matthew here relates, that the disciples first prayed the Lord to send the multitudes away, that they might buy food from the nearest towns. Suppose then that after these words the Lord looked upon the multitude and said what John relates, but Matthew and the others have omitted. And by such cases as this none ought to be perplexed, when one of the Evangelists relates what the rest have omitted."

Chrysostom: "Yet not even by these words were the disciples set right, but speak yet to Him as to man; They answered unto Him, We have here but five loaves and two fishes. From this we learn the philosophy of the disciples, how far they despised food; they were twelve in number, yet they had but five loaves and two fishes; for things of the body were contemned by them, they were altogether possessed by spiritual things. But because the disciples were yet attracted to earth, the Lord begins to introduce the things that were of Himself; He saith unto them, Bring them hither to me. Wherefore does He not create out of nothing the bread to feed the multitude with? That He might put to silence the mouth of Marcion and Manichæus, who take away from God His creatures, and by His deeds might teach that all things that are seen are His works and creation, and that it is He that has given us the fruits of the earth, who said in the beginning, Let the earth bring forth the green herb; (Gen. 1:11.) for this is no less a deed than that. For of five loaves to make so many loaves, and fishes in like manner, is no less a thing than to bring fruits from the earth, reptiles and other living things from the waters; which showed Him to be Lord both of land and sea. By the example of the disciples also we ought to be taught, that though we should have but little, we ought to give that to such as have need. For they when bid to bring their five loaves say not, Whence shall we satisfy our own hunger? but immediately obey; And He commanded the multitude to sit down on the grass, and took the five loaves and the two fishes, and looking up to heaven blessed them, and brake. Why did He look to heaven and bless? For it should be believed concerning Him that He is from the Father, and that He is equal with the Father. His equality He shows when He does all things with power. That He is from the Father He shows by referring to Him whatsoever He does, and calling upon Him on all occasions. To prove these two things therefore, He works His miracles at times with power, at other times with prayer. It should be considered also that in lesser things He looks to heaven, but in greater He does all with power. When He forgave sins, raised the dead, stilled the sea, opened the secrets of the heart, opened the eyes of him that was born blind, which were works only of God, He is not seen to pray; but when He multiplies the loaves, a work less than any of these, He looks up to heaven, that you may learn that even in little things He has no power but from His Father. And at the same time He teaches us not to touch our food, until we have returned thanks to Him who gives it us. For this reason also He looks up to heaven, because His disciples had examples of many other miracles, but none of this."

Jerome: "While the Lord breaks there is a sowing of food; for had the loaves been whole and not broken into fragments, and thus divided into a manifold harvest, they could not have fed so great a multitude. The multitude receives the food from the Lord through the Apostles; as it follows, And he gave the loaves to his disciples, and the disciples to the multitude."

Chrysostom: "In doing which He not only honoured them, but would that upon this miracle they should not be unbelieving, nor forget it when it was past, seeing their own hands had borne witness to it. Therefore also He suffers the multitudes first to feel the sense of hunger, and His disciples to come to Him, and to ask Him, and He took the loaves at their hands, that they might have many testimonies of that that was done, and many things to remind them of the miracle. From this that He gave them, nothing more than bread and fish, and that He set this equally before all, He taught them moderation, frugality, and that charity by which they should have all things in common. This He also taught them in the place, in making them sit down upon the grass; for He sought not to feed the body only, but to instruct the mind. But the bread and fish multiplied in the disciples’ hands; whence it follows, And they did all eat, and were filled. But the miracle ended not here; for He caused to abound not only whole loaves, but fragments also; to show that the first loaves were not so much as what was left, and that they who were not present might learn what had been done, and that none might think that what had been done was a phantasy; And they took up fragments that were left, twelve baskets full."

Jerome: "Each of the Apostles fills his basket of the fragments left by his Saviour, that these fragments might witness that they were true loaves that were multiplied."

Chrysostom: "For this reason also He caused twelve baskets to remain over and above, that Judas might bear his basket. He took up the fragments, and gave them to the disciples and not to the multitudes, who were yet more imperfectly trained than the disciples."

Jerome: "To the number of loaves, five, the number of the men that ate is apportioned, five thousand; And the number of them that had eaten was about five thousand men, besides women and children."

Chrysostom: "This was to the very great credit of the people, that the women and the men stood up when these remnants still remained."

Hilary of Poitiers: "The five loaves are not multiplied into more, but fragments succeed to fragments; the substance growing whether upon the tables, or in the hands that took them up, I know not."

Rabanus Maurus: "When John is to describe this miracle, he first tells us that the passover is at hand; Matthew and Mark place it immediately after the execution of John. Hence we may gather, that he was beheaded when the paschal festival was near at hand, and that at the passover of the following year, the mystery of the Lord’s passion was accomplished."

Jerome: "But all these things are full of mysteries; the Lord does these things not in the morning, nor at noon, but in the evening, when the Sun of righteousness was set."

Saint Remigius: "By the evening the Lord’s death is denoted; and after He, the true Sun, was set on the altar of the cross, He filled the hungry. Or by evening is denoted the last age of this world, in which the Son of God came and refreshed the multitudes of those that believed on Him."

Rabanus Maurus: "When the disciples ask the Lord to send away the multitudes that they might buy food in the towns, it signifies the pride of the Jews towards the multitudes of the Gentiles, whom they judged rather fit to seek for themselves food in the assemblies of the Pharisees than to use the pasture of the Divine books."

Hilary of Poitiers: "But the Lord answered, They have no need to go, showing that those whom He heals have no need of the food of mercenary doctrine, and have no necessity to return to Judæa to buy food; and He commands the Apostles that they give them food. Did He not know then that there was nothing to give them? But there was a complete series of types to be set forth; for as yet it was not given the Apostles to make and minister the heavenly bread, the food of eternal life; and their answer thus belongs to the chain of spiritual interpretation; they were as yet confined to the five loaves, that is, the five books of the Law, and the two fishes, that is, the preaching of the Prophets and of John."

Rabanus Maurus: "Or, by the two fishes we may understand the Prophets, and the Psalms, for the whole of the Old Testament was comprehended in these three, the Law, the Prophets, and the Psalms."

Hilary of Poitiers: "These therefore the Apostles first set forth, because they were yet in these things; and from these things the preaching of the Gospel grows to its more abundant strength and virtue. Then the people is commanded to sit down upon the grass, as no longer lying upon the ground, but resting upon the Law, each one reposing upon the fruit of his own works as upon the grass of the earth."

Jerome: "Or, they are bid to lie down on the grass, and that, according to another Evangelist, by fifties and by hundreds, that after they have trampled upon their flesh, and have subjugated the pleasures of the world as dried grass under them, then by the presencea of the number fifty, they ascend to the eminent perfection of a hundred. He looks up to heaven to teach us that our eyes are to be directed thither. The Law with the Prophets is broken, and in the midst of them are brought forward mysteries., that whereas they partook not of it whole, when broken into pieces it may be food for the multitude of the Gentiles."

Hilary of Poitiers: "Then the loaves are given to the Apostles, because through them the gifts of divine grace were to be rendered. And the number of them that did eat is found to be the same as that of those who should believe; for we find in the book of Acts that out of the vast number of the people of Israel, five thousand men believed."

Jerome: "There partook five thousand who had reached maturity; for women and children, the weaker sex, and the tender age, were unworthy of number; thus in the book of Numbers, slaves, women, children, and an undistinguished crowd, are passed over unnumbered."

Rabanus Maurus: "The multitude being hungry, He creates no new viands, but having taken what the disciples had, He gave thanks. In like manner when He came in the flesh, He preached no other things than what had been foretold, but showed that the writings of the Law and the Prophets were big with mysteries. That which, the multitude leave is taken up by the disciples, because the more secret mysteries which cannot be comprehended by the uninstructed, are not to be treated with neglect, but are to be diligently sought out by the twelve Apostles (who are represented by the twelve baskets) and their successors. For by baskets servile offices are performed, and God has chosen the weak things of the world to confound the strong. The five thousand for the five senses of the body are they who in a secular condition know how to use rightly things without."

Preceded by Matthew 14:14	Gospel of Matthew; Chapter 14	Succeeded by Matthew 14:22
