= Matthew 14:3 =

- ← 14:2 14:4 →
- Book: Gospel of Matthew
- Christian Bible part: New Testament

Matthew 14:3 is the third verse in the fourteenth chapter of the Gospel of Matthew in the New Testament.

== Content ==
In the original Greek according to Westcott-Hort, this verse is:

Ὁ γὰρ Ἡρῴδης κρατήσας τὸν Ἰωάννην ἔδησεν αὐτὸν καὶ ἔθετο ἐν φυλακῇ, διὰ Ἡρῳδιάδα τὴν γυναῖκα Φιλίππου τοῦ ἀδελφοῦ αὐτοῦ.

In the King James Version of the Bible the text reads:

For Herod had laid hold on John, and bound him, and put him in prison for Herodias’ sake, his brother Philip’s wife.

The New International Version translates the passage as:

Now Herod had arrested John and bound him and put him in prison because of Herodias, his brother Philip's wife,

== Analysis ==
According to Josephus, John was held in a castle of Machaerus, near the Dead Sea. It is said that the Pharisees likely helped Herod from envy of John. Herod left his former wife, and this is related to have led to her father King Aretas of Arabia destroying Herod's army. Although this Herod Antipas, like his father, Herod the Great was not a Jew, he was a proselyte and therefore he was bound by the law not to enter into such a marriage. (Lev 28:16)

== Commentary from the Church Fathers ==
Chrysostom: "And this relation is not set before us as a principal matter, because the Evangelist’s only object was to tell us concerning Christ, and nothing beyond, unless so far as it furthered this object. He says then, For Herod had seized John, and bound him."

Augustine: " Luke does not give this in the same order, but where he is speaking of the Lord’s baptism, so that he took beforehand an event which happened long afterwards. For after that saying of John’s concerning the Lord, that His fan is in His hand, he straightway adds this, which, as we may gather from John’s Gospel, did not follow immediately. For he relates that after Jesus was baptized, He went into Galilee, and thence returned into Judæa, and baptized there near to the Jordan before John was cast into prison. But neither Matthew nor Mark have placed John’s imprisonment in that order in which it appears from their own writings that it took place; for they also say that when John was delivered up, the Lord went into Galilee, and after many things there done, then by occasion of the fame of Christ reaching Herod they relate what took place in the imprisonment and beheading of John. The cause for which he had been cast into prison he shows when he says, On account of Herodias his brother’s wife. For John had said unto him, It is not lawful for thee to have her."

Preceded by Matthew 14:2	Gospel of Matthew; Chapter 14	Succeeded by Matthew 14:4
