= Matthew 14:13 =

- ← 14:12 14:14 →
- Book: Gospel of Matthew
- Christian Bible part: New Testament

Matthew 14:13 is the thirteenth verse in the fourteenth chapter of the Gospel of Matthew in the New Testament.

== Content ==
In the original Greek according to Westcott-Hort, this verse reads:

Καὶ ἀκούσας ὁ Ἰησοῦς ἀνεχώρησεν ἐκεῖθεν ἐν πλοίῳ εἰς ἔρημον τόπον κατ᾿ ἰδίαν· καὶ ἀκούσαντες οἱ ὄχλοι ἠκολούθησαν αὐτῷ πεζῇ ἀπὸ τῶν πόλεων.

In the King James Version of the Bible, the text reads:

When Jesus heard of it, he departed thence by ship into a desert place apart: and when the people had heard thereof, they followed him on foot out of the cities.

The New International Version translates the passage as:

When Jesus heard what had happened, he withdrew by boat privately to a solitary place. Hearing of this, the crowds followed him on foot from the towns.

Several translations state that Jesus was there "alone", or "by himself". In contrast, the Jerusalem Bible refers to a place "where they could be by themselves".

== Analysis ==
In this verse it appears that Jesus withdrew to escape from Herod because "his hour had not yet come". In this he gives an example of his own words, "when they persecute you in this city, flee to another" (Matthew 10:23). Another possible reason is that he retired in order to give his disciples a chance to rest.

Henirich Meyer notes that this is the second point of "withdrawal" (the first in Matthew 12:15, and the third in Matthew 15:21) from the same Greek word, ἀνεχώρησεν (anechōrēsen).

== Commentary from the Church Fathers ==
Glossa Ordinaria: "The Saviour having heard the death of His Baptist, retired into the desert; as it follows, which when Jesus had heard, he departed thence by ship into a desert place."

Augustine: "This the Evangelist relates to have been done immediately after the passion of John, therefore after this were those things done that were spoken of above, and moved Herod to say, This is John. For we must suppose those things to have been after his death which report carried to Herod, and which moved him to doubt who he could be concerning whom he heard such things; for himself had put John to death."

Jerome: "He did not retire into the desert through fear of death, as some suppose, but in mercy to His enemies, that they might not add murder to murder; putting off His death till the day of His passion; on which day the lamb is to be slain as the sacrament, and the posts of them that believe to be sprinkled with the blood. Or, He retired to leave us an example to shun that rashness which leads men to surrender themselves voluntarily, because not all persevere with like constancy under torture with the which they offered themselves to it. For this reason He says in another place, When they shall persecute you in one city, flee ye to another. Whence the Evangelist says not ‘fled,’ but elegantly, departed thence, (or, ‘withdrew,’) showing that He shunned rather than feared persecution. Or for another reason He might have withdrawn into a desert place on hearing of John’s death, namely, to prove the faith of the believers."

Chrysostom: "Or; He did this because He desired to prolong the œconomy of His humanity, the time not being yet come for openly manifesting His deity; wherefore also He charged His disciples that they should tell no man that He was the Christ. But after His resurrection He would have this made manifest. Therefore although He knew of Himself what was done, yet before it was told Him He withdrew not, that He might show the verity of His incarnation in all things; for He would that this should be assured not by sight only, but by His actions. And when He withdrew, He did not go into the city, but into the desert by ship that none might follow Him. Yet do not the multitudes leave Him even for this, but still follow after Him, not deterred by what had been done concerning John; whence it follows, And when the multitudes had heard thereof, they followed him on foot out of the cities."

Jerome: "They followed on foot, not riding, or in carriages, but with the toil of their own legs, to show the ardour of their mind."

| Preceded by Matthew 14:12 | Gospel of Matthew; Chapter 14 | Succeeded by Matthew 14:14 |
