= José O'Callaghan Martínez =

Spanish priest and academic

José O'Callaghan Martínez SJ
- Born: October 7, 1922; Tortosa, Tarragona, Spain
- Died: December 15, 2001 (aged 79); Barcelona, Spain
- Known for: 7Q5

Academic background
- Education: Sant Cugat del Vallès; University of Madrid; Università di Milano

Academic work
- Discipline: papyrology Biblical studies
- Institutions: Sant Cugat del Vallès; Pontificio Istituto Biblico
- Main interests: Christian papyri

José O'Callaghan Martínez, SJ (October 7, 1922 – December 15, 2001) was a Spanish Jesuit priest, papyrologist and Biblical scholar.

He is known for his extensive work on Christian papyri and for the identification of the 7Q5 papyrus of Qumran with a text of Mark 6:52–53.

== Biography ==
Born in Tortosa, Tarragona, Spain, in 1922, he joined the Jesuits on October 29, 1940. He was ordained on May 31, 1952 and became Bachelor in Theology from the Sant Cugat del Vallès, Barcelona, in 1953, Doctor in Philosophy and Literature from the University of Madrid in 1959, and Doctor in Classic Literature from the Università di Milano in 1960.

He was professor of the Faculty of Theology of S. Cugat del Vallés (1961–1971), Barcelona, where he founded the School of Papyri Studies (Seminario de Papirología). In 1971 he joined the Pontificio Istituto Biblico in Rome (1971–1992). In 1980 he returned to Barcelona as professor of Textual reviews with Dr. R.P. Pierre Proulx. He was dean of the Biblical Faculty (1983–1986). He founded the Studia Papirologica publication.

He died on December 15, 2001.

== 7Q5 ==
O'Callaghan became famous for his identification of a small scrap of papyrus discovered in Cave 7 of Qumran named by the editors as "7Q5" (Cave 7 + Qumran + Papyrus 5). It was stated before his identification (and by some since) that there were no texts of the New Testament found in the caves of the Qumran complex. Claims that the caves of the Dead Sea could hold documents of the early Christian communities were held as naive and even absurd.

O'Callaghan did not set out to look for papyri of the New Testament at Qumran, but his interest was identification of the fragments that the editors could not fully clarify. More than a dozen years after certain scraps were printed, it dawned on O'Callaghan that certain of the clear and identifiable letters on them might be part of the occasional New Testament name for the Sea of Galilee, the Sea of Genneseret. Hitherto it had been assumed that such letters were part of the Greek word for "to beget," yet no one had been able to find any piece of ancient literature which fit with this identification of the letters and the surrounding necessary context of other letters.

The results of his work with the small fragment brought him to the conclusion that 7Q5 could be a fragment of the Gospel of Mark and he published his investigation in 1972 in his work "¿Papiros neotestamentarios en la cueva 7 de Qumrân?" (New Testament Papyri in Cave 7 at Qumran?). The reaction of scholars, especially those committed to the conventional wisdom of how the Bible became formulated, was almost universally against O'Callaghan. His identification was viewed as an almost impossible claim since the papyrus itself had been dated prior to the identification as having been written no later than 50 CE, much earlier than scholars thought the New Testament had been written. The Spanish scholar's career was frustrated and he was practically isolated until 1982 when Prof. Carsten Peter Thiede reviewed the research of O'Callaghan. Thiede came to the conclusion that O'Callaghan's proposals were not illogical and his scientific method was serious and possible. Thiede revived the discussion again in his work The Earliest Gospel Manuscript? in 1982. However, even today the majority of papyrus scholars disagree with O'Callaghan's conclusion.

== Works ==
- Las tres categorías estéticas de la cultura clásica: armonía, claridad, grandeza. Barcelona: Consejo Superior de Investigaciones Científicas, Instituto "Luis Vives" de Filosofía. 1960. p. 288.
- Cartas cristianas griegas del siglo V. Biblioteca Balmes Barcelona: Biblioteca histórica de la Biblioteca Balmes. Vol. 25. Barcelona: Balmes. 1963. p. 251.
- Studia Papirologica.

== Articles ==
- "Carta privada griega del siglo Vp. P.Palau Rib. inv. 7". Studia papyrologica: revista española de papirología. 12: 41–45. 1973.
- "Nota sobre BGU III 948,13 [IV/V^{p}]". Zeitschrift für Papyrologie und Epigraphik. 82: 103–106. 1990.
- "La palabra « Camisa » en Los papiros griegos". Aegyptus. 76: 51–55. 1996.
- "¿Papiro neotestamentarios en la cueva 7 de Qumrán?". Biblica. 53. Roma: 91–100. 1972.
- "Notas sobre 7Q tomadas en el « Rockefeller Museum » de Jerusalén (Tabulæ extra seriem)". Biblica. 53 (4). Roma: 517–536. 1972.
