= Carsten Peter Thiede =

German archaeologist

Carsten Peter Thiede OCF KStJ (8 August 1952 – 14 December 2004) was a German archaeologist and New Testament scholar. He was also a member of PEN and appointed a Knight of Justice of the Order of St John. He taught as professor of New Testament times and history at the Staatsunabhängige Theologische Hochschule (STH) in Basel and at the Ben-Gurion University of the Negev in Beersheba, Israel. He often advanced theories that conflicted with the consensus of academic and theological scholarship.

== Early life and career ==
Born in West Berlin, Thiede studied comparative literature and history there before procuring a German National Scholarship Foundation Research Fellow position at Queen's College at Oxford University in 1976, where he attained a Blue for volleyball, which he had played in the German Volleyball Premier League.

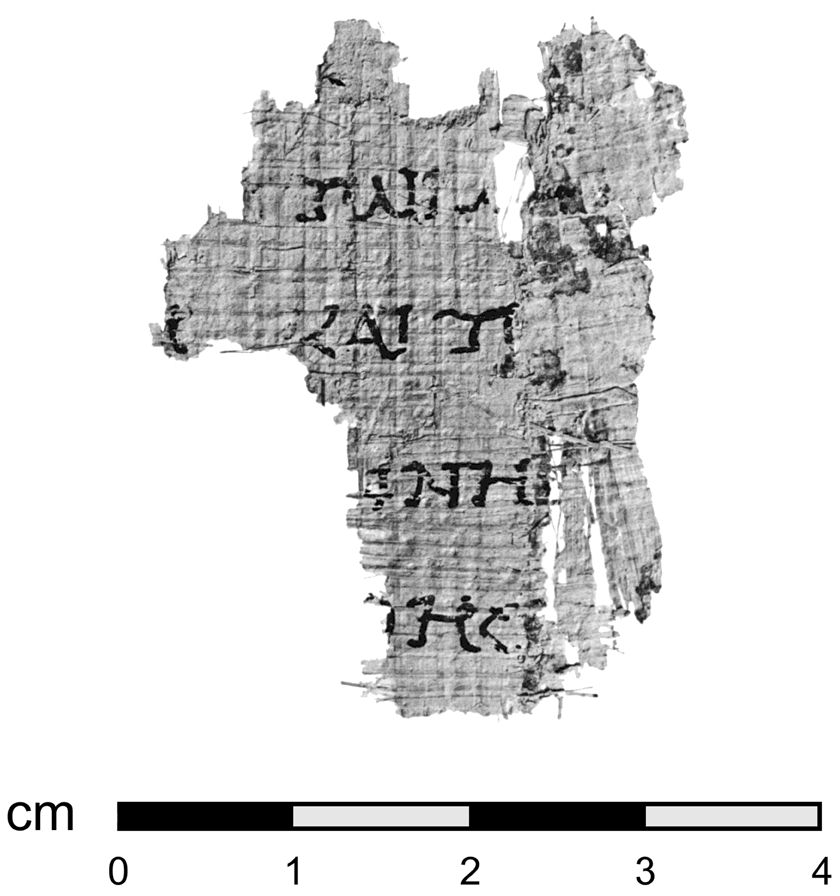
Fragment 5 from Cave 7 of the Qumran Community in its entirety

In 1978, he became a senior lecturer in comparative literature at Geneva, where he drew inspiration from his fellow "comparativist", George Steiner. Drawn to the subject of early Christianity because of his background as a linguist and his expertise in medieval Latin philology, the study of the origins of Christianity came to form his life's work.

For a number of years into the early '90s Thiede worked with various broadcasting companies, including BBC Radio and ERF, and as an editor at the Brockhaus publishing company.

== New Testament work ==
Thiede was best known for his interpretation of some of the Greek Dead Sea Scrolls fragments, including the identification of the small 7Q5 papyrus fragment (illustration) as a fragment of the Gospel of Mark. He supported O’Callaghan’s controversial claims that several papyrus fragments from Qumran Cave 7 are actually Christian New Testament texts from pre AD 70.

In December 1994, Thiede redated the Magdalen papyrus together with former deputy editor of The Sunday Telegraph and later editor of The Spectator, Matthew d'Ancona, which bears a fragment in Greek of the Gospel of Matthew, to the latter part of the 1st century on palaeographical grounds; this too provoked much debate and was highly publicised, most notably with a front-page headline in The Times. By attempting to make his material more accessible to the general public he was often accused of being a popular science writer.

Carsten Thiede initially wrote an article in the academically peer-reviewed Zeitschrift für Papyrologie in regards to his dating of the papyrus to the last third of the first century. He improved upon his research and published the results in his book titled Eyewitness to Jesus in 1996. Thiede was able to date the Magdalen papyrus containing a portion of Matthew's Gospel to 66 CE using more advanced papyrological techniques and comparative analysis with a document dated to 66 CE (P. Oxy 246 II).

In The Quest for the True Cross, also co-written with d'Ancona, Thiede argued that the Titulus Crucis could in fact be part of Jesus' cross, based on his palaeographic study of the writing, though it is considered to be a medieval forgery by many scholars. Thiede is particularly noted for his research into early Christianity, notably Peter and Paul.

For the last seven years of his life, Thiede also worked for the Israel Antiquities Authority repairing damage to the Dead Sea Scrolls and excavating the biblical location of Emmaus. A devout Anglican who was ordained priest in 2000, he was also Chaplain to Her Majesty's Forces despite being a German citizen. He died in Paderborn suddenly at the age of 52 from a heart attack.

== Selected English bibliography ==
- Simon Peter: From Galilee to Rome (1988) ISBN 0-310-51561-0
- From Christ to Constantine: The Trial and Testimony of the Early Church (1991) ISBN 9781563642005
- The Heritage of the First Christians (1994) ISBN 0-7459-2544-8
- The Jesus Papyrus (1994) ISBN 978-0-385-48898-3 (also published as Eyewitness to Jesus (1996) ISBN 0-385-48051-2)(Co-author Matthew D'Ancona)
- Rekindling the Word: In Search of Gospel Truth (1996) ISBN 1-56338-136-2
- Jesus: Life or Legend (2001) ISBN 0-7459-3895-7
- The Dead Sea Scrolls (2001) ISBN 0-7459-5050-7
- The Quest for the True Cross (2002) ISBN 0-312-29424-7
- The Dead Sea Scrolls and the Jewish Origins of Christianity (2003) ISBN 1-4039-6143-3
- The Cosmopolitan World of Jesus: New Light from Archaeology (2004) ISBN 0-281-05508-4
- Emmaus Mystery: Discovering Evidence of the Risen Christ (2005) ISBN 0-8264-6797-0
- Jesus: Man or Myth? (2006) ISBN 0-7459-5147-3
