= Mark 6 =

- ← chapter 5 chapter 7 →
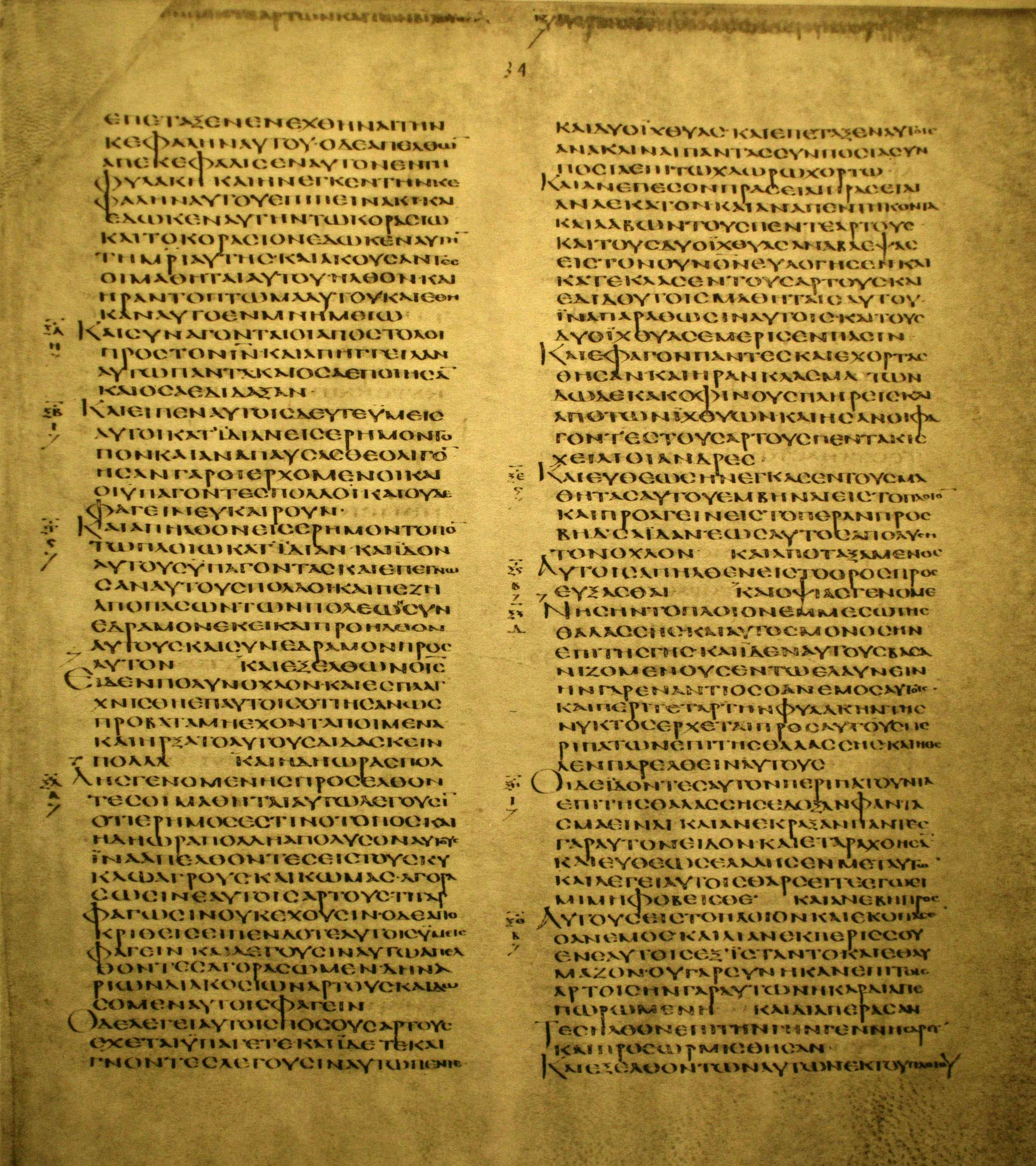
- Leaf containing Mark 6:27–54 in Codex Alexandrinus from c. AD 400-440
- Book: Gospel of Mark
- Category: Gospel
- Christian Bible part: New Testament
- Order in the Christian part: 2

Mark 6 is the sixth chapter of the Gospel of Mark in the New Testament of the Christian Bible. In this chapter, Jesus goes to Nazareth and experiences rejection by his own family. He then sends his Apostles in pairs to various cities in the region, where they might also face rejection. Finally, Jesus goes back to the Sea of Galilee and performs some of his most famous miracles, including the feeding of the 5,000 and walking on water. This chapter also gives an account of the murder of John the Baptist.

== Text ==
The original text was written in Koine Greek. This chapter is divided into 56 verses.

=== Textual witnesses ===
Some early manuscripts containing the text of this chapter are:

- Codex Vaticanus (325–350; complete)
- Codex Sinaiticus (330–360; complete)
- Codex Bezae (~400; complete)
- Codex Alexandrinus (400–440; complete)
- Codex Ephraemi Rescriptus (~450; extant verses 1–31)

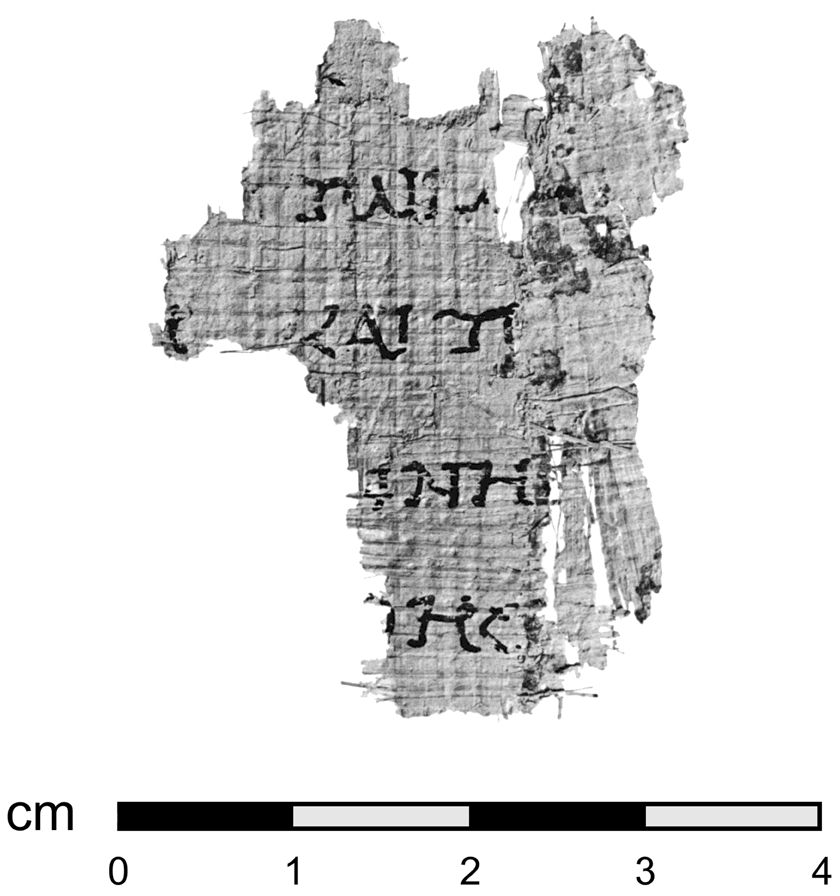
Fragment 7Q5 from Qumran

=== Dead Sea Scrolls ===
In 1972, Spanish papyrologist Jose O'Callaghan proposed in his work ¿Papiros neotestamentarios en la cueva 7 de Qumrân? ("New Testament Papyri in Cave 7 at Qumran?") that among the Dead Sea Scrolls, 7Q5, a small Greek papyrus fragment discovered in Qumran Cave 7 (dated between 50 B.C. and 50 A.D), actually contains the text from Mark 6:52–53, and this was later reasserted and expanded by German scholar Carsten Peter Thiede in his work The Earliest Gospel Manuscript? in 1982. Carlo Maria Martini, S.J., Archbishop of Milan and part of the five member team which edited the definitive modern edition of the Greek New Testament for the United Bible Societies, agreed with O'Callaghan's identification and assertions, but the majority of scholars have not been convinced by O'Callaghan's and Thiede's arguments.

== Verse 1 ==
Jesus leaves "from there" (i.e. Capernaum), and goes to his "home town" (Greek: τὴν πατρίδα αὐτοῦ, tēn patrida autou). Heinrich Meyer argues that "there" refers to Jairus' house, the last location mentioned in chapter 5, and John McEvilly concurs that this was likely to have been the case.

Nazareth is not named here explicitly, but Mark 1:9 states that "Jesus came from Nazareth of Galilee". It lies about 42 kilometres (26 mi) from Capernaum on modern roads.

== Rejection of Jesus at Nazareth ==
Mark relates the story of Jesus' initial acclaim and later rejection at Nazareth, "his own country". The account is also found in Matthew 13:53–58 and it is related at an earlier point in Jesus' ministry in Luke 4:14–30. Verse 2 notes that "many who heard him" were impressed by the wisdom which had been given to him (or, "to such a man": manuscripts differ in the wording of this verse), and the "mighty works" performed by his hands. Since in verse 5, Mark goes on to note that Jesus performed a minimal amount of healing in Nazareth, it is generally supposed that they had heard of the miracles which Jesus had performed in Capernaum and elsewhere. His neighbours question his authority and do not seem to think much of the Jesus they remember or his family. "Isn't this the carpenter (τέκτων, tektōn)? Isn't this Mary's son and the brother of James, Joseph, Judas and Simon? Aren't his sisters here with us?"

Jesus replies with a proverb, Only in his hometown, among his relatives and in his own house is a prophet without honor. John 4:44 records the same sentiment: Jesus Himself testified that a prophet has no honor in his own country, but in John's account the Galileans received Him, having seen all the things He did in Jerusalem at the feast.

Jesus' brothers are here and in Matthew and probably Acts 12:17 mentioned by name, though not his sisters. This chapter, coupled with Mark 3:21,31–35 paints a negative view of Jesus' family relations, though other sources, such as Galatians 1:19 show that James was at least active in the early Church after Jesus' crucifixion. The negative view of Jesus' family may be related to the conflict between Paul and the Jerusalem Church.

== Mission of the Twelve ==
In verses 7–13, Jesus sends the twelve out to the various towns, in pairs, to heal the sick and drive out demons:

^{7} And he called the twelve and began to send them out two by two, and gave them authority over the unclean spirits. ^{8} He charged them to take nothing for their journey except a staff — no bread, no bag, no money in their belts — ^{9} but to wear sandals and not put on two tunics. (Verses 7–9).

Irish Bishop George Chadwick argues that in the face of rejection, Jesus' response is to accelerate his mission, varying as well as multiplying the means for the evangelisation of the country. The twelve who he sends out are to take only their staffs, and if any town rejects them, they are to "... shake the dust off your feet when you leave, as a testimony against them" (11), which Robert Miller describes as "... a gesture both of contempt and of warning".

On the injunction to take no bag and no money, Bishop Tom Wright notes that this is given as an emergency directive for "a swift and dangerous mission", and should not be treated as "a programme for the continuing life of the church".

"Tunics" (Greek: δύο χιτῶνας, duo chitonas, verse 9) were the long garments worn under the cloak, next to the skin.

== The death of John the Baptist ==
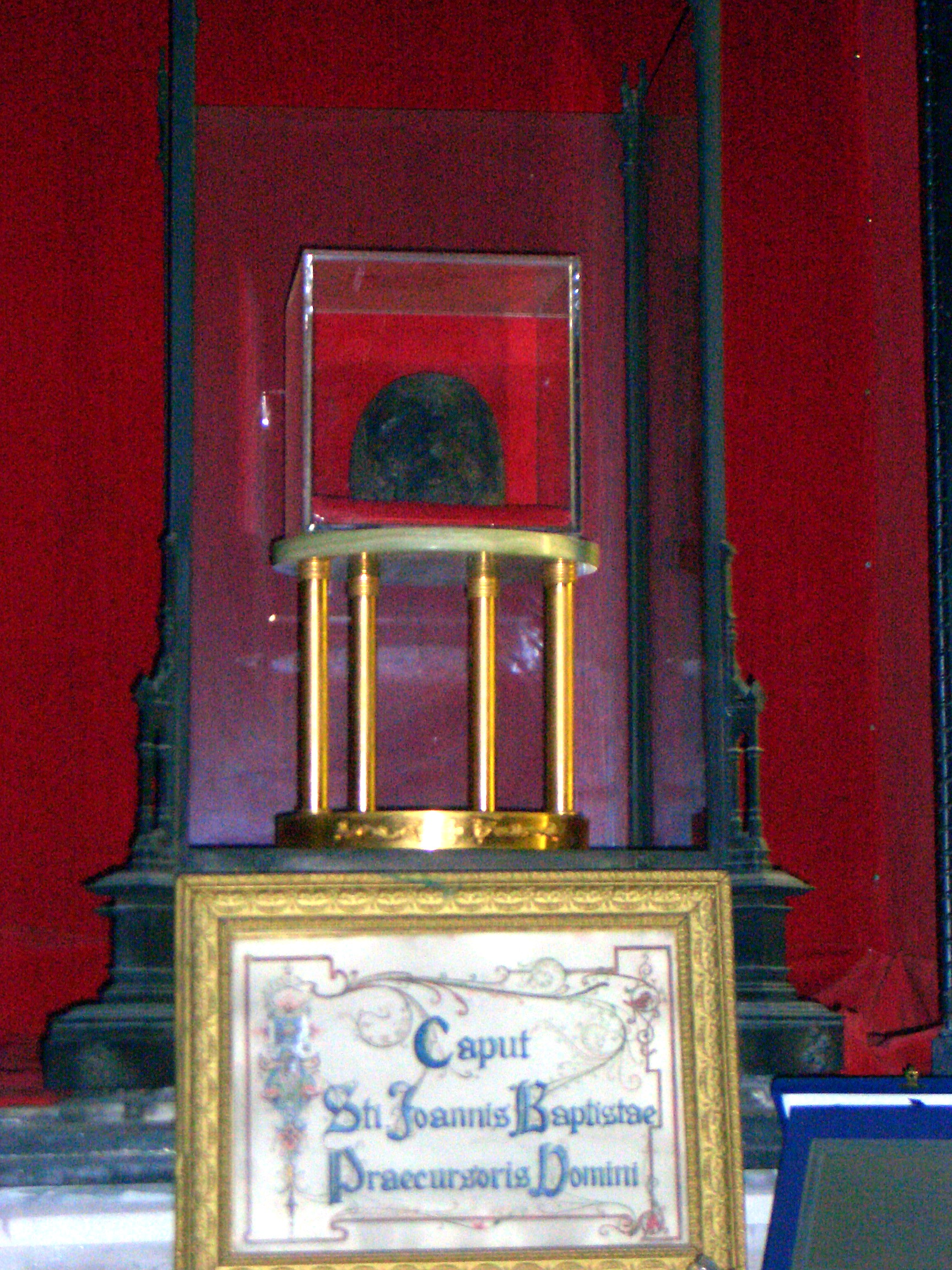
Supposed head of John the Baptist, enshrined in Rome

Mark then tells of the death of John the Baptist at the hands of Herod Antipas. Herod is married to his wife Herodias, former wife of his brother Herod Philip I. John condemns Herod so Herod incarcerates John, although Mark refers to a respectful relationship between Herod and John: "a mixture of reverence and superstitious dread towards the prophet and man of God". Herodias seeks revenge on John during a birthday party for Herod. Her daughter (Salome) dances for Herod and persuades Herod to kill John. John's disciples take his body and put it in a tomb. This account is also found in Matthew 14:1–12. The year in which John died is unknown. Josephus reports Herod killing John to quell a possible uprising around AD 36. Herod Philip died in 34 and Herod Antipas died sometime after 40 after being exiled to either Gaul or Spain.

== Feeding of the five thousand and walking on water ==
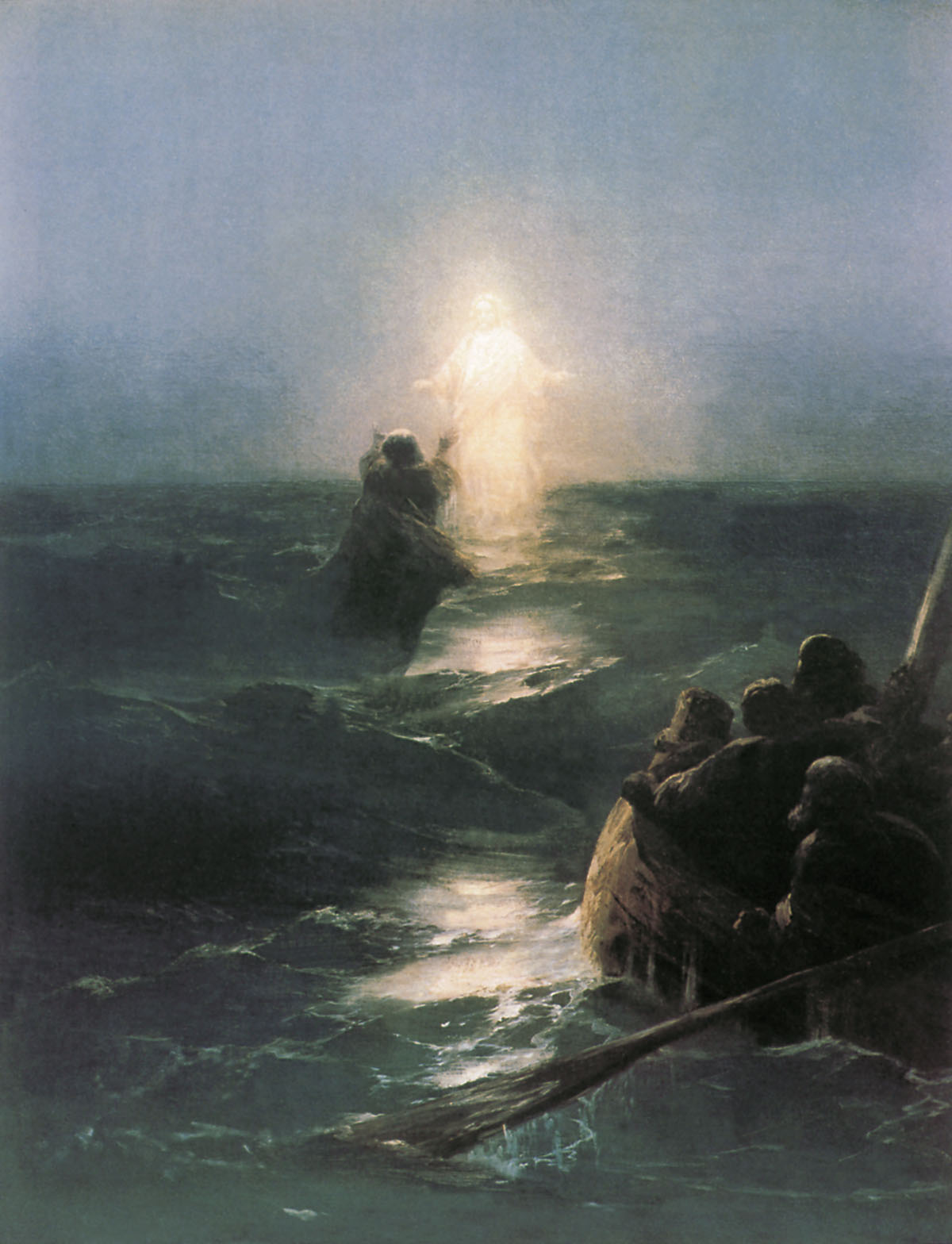
Walking on water, by Ivan Aivazovsky (1888)

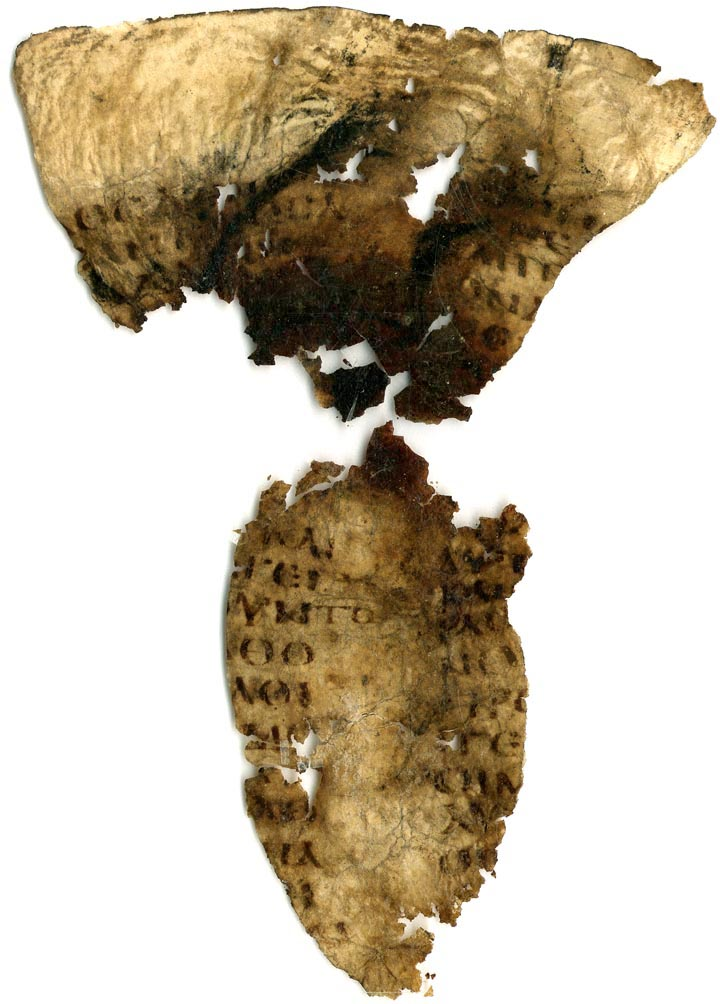
Mark 6:30–41 in Uncial 0187 (6th century)

The "apostles", (οἱ ἀπόστολοι, hoi apostoloi) come back (regroup) and report to Jesus on "what they had done and what they had taught". Anglican writer George Maclear suggests they have returned to Capernaum. He takes them on a boat to a deserted place where they can rest. Verse 6:30 is the only time in the received canonical texts where Mark uses "οι αποστολοι", although some texts also use this word in Mark 3:14 and it is most frequently – 68 out of 79 New Testament occurrences – used by Luke the Evangelist and Paul of Tarsus.

Mark then relates two miracles of Jesus. When they land, a large crowd is already waiting for them. Jesus teaches them several unrecorded things, then feeds the entire crowd of 5,000 men (Greek: ἄνδρες, andres, most frequently meaning 'male adult' in New Testament usage) by turning five loaves of bread and two fish into enough food to feed everyone. Matthew 14:21 says there were 5,000 men "besides woman and children".

Jesus sends the disciples in a boat ahead of him to Bethsaida. It is night and they are only halfway across when Jesus walks across the lake and meets them. At first they are scared and think it is a ghost, but Jesus reveals himself and gets into the boat, amazing the disciples.

These two miracles occur in John 6:1–24 and Matthew 14:13–36 and the feeding of the crowd is in Luke 9:10–17.

The feeding of the 5,000 people and the resurrection of Jesus appear to be the only miracles recorded simultaneously in all four Gospels.

== Healing of the sick of Gennesaret ==
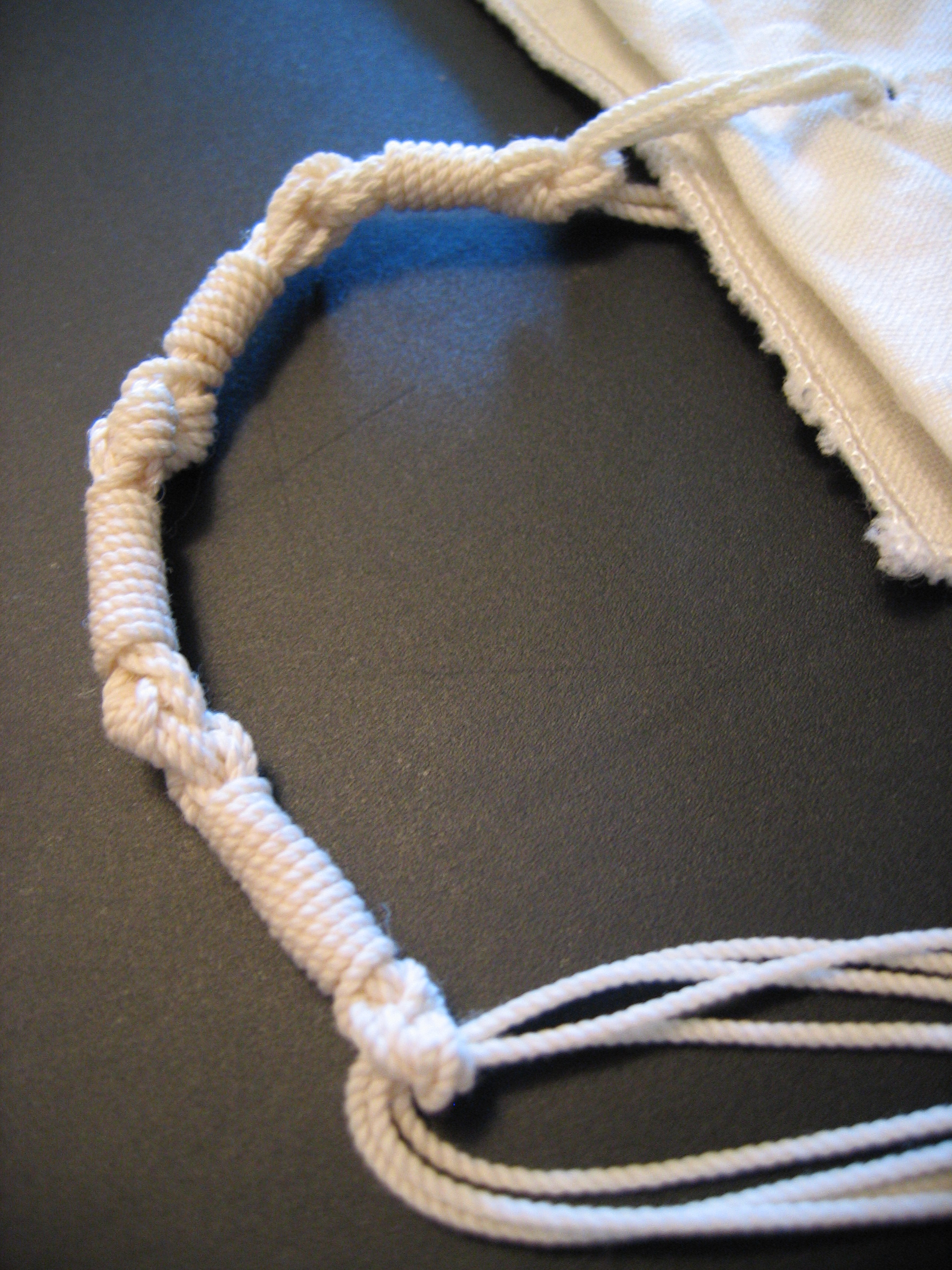
The tzitzis strings of one corner of a tallit

They reach Gennesaret and people recognize Jesus. People bring sick people on mats to wherever they hear Jesus is. They beg him to let them touch him, even only touching the "fringe of his cloak" (6:56NRSV), and all the people who do so are healed. Jesus seems willing to help all who ask for it. Raymond E. Brown argued that this section leaves readers suspecting that such enthusiasm for healing is not the right comprehension of or faith in Jesus. This section is an example of a Marcan summary, in which several stories about Jesus are all wrapped up into one description. They help show the magnitude of his power and perhaps the nature of the danger the authorities see him as presenting to the public order.

== See also ==
- Luke 9:3
- Mark 3
- Matthew 10:10

== Sources ==
- Brown, Raymond E., An Introduction to the New Testament, Doubleday 1997 ISBN 0-385-24767-2
- Kilgallen, John J., A Brief Commentary of the Gospel of Mark, Paulist Press 1989 ISBN 0-8091-3059-9
- Miller, Robert J., The Complete Gospels, Polebridge Press 1994 ISBN 0-06-065587-9

Preceded by Mark 5	Chapters of the Bible; Gospel of Mark	Succeeded by Mark 7
