= 7Q5 =

Dead Sea scroll fragment

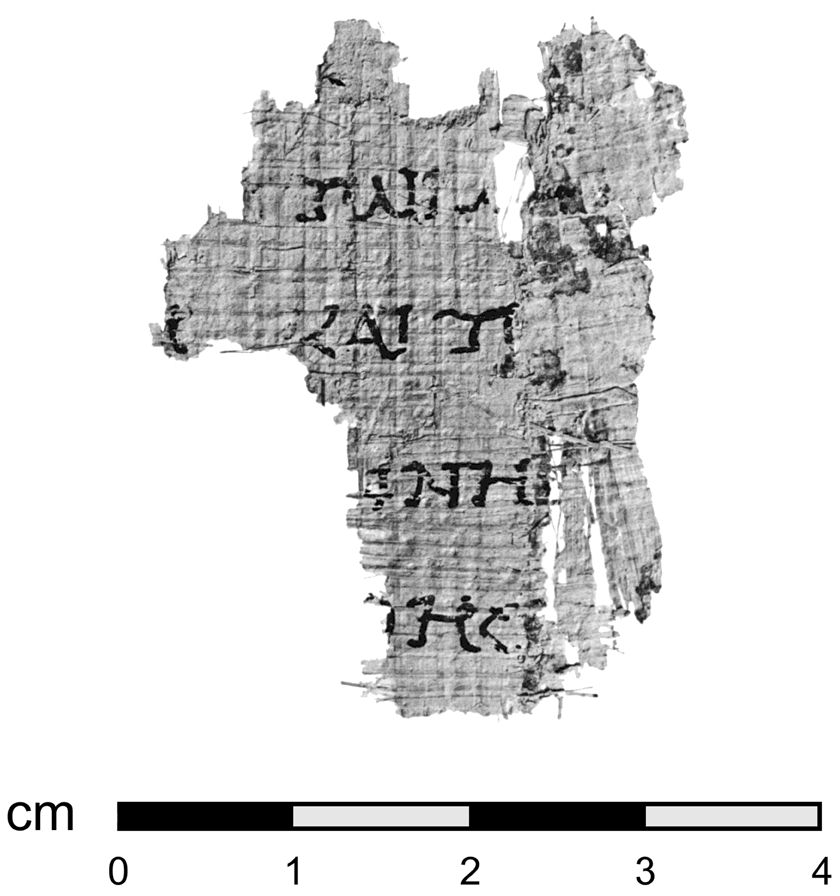
Fragment 5 from Cave 7 of the Qumran Community in its entirety

Among the Dead Sea Scrolls, 7Q5 is the designation for a small Greek papyrus fragment discovered in Qumran Cave 7. It contains about 18 legible or partially legible Greek letters and was published in 1962 as an unidentified text. The editor assigned the fragment to a date between 50 BCE and 50 CE on the basis of its handwriting. In 1972, the Spanish papyrologist Jose O'Callaghan argued that the papyrus was in fact a fragment of the Gospel of Mark, chapter 6, verses 52 and 53. While most scholars have been unpersuaded by this argument, a vocal minority continue to support the identification of the fragment as a part of the Gospel of Mark.

== O'Callaghan's proposed identification ==
O'Callaghan challenged the reading of the original edition of the fragment, largely because he misunderstood the original editor's use of an iota subscript in line 2 of the fragment. The Greek text below shows O'Callaghan's reconstruction with bold font representing proposed identifications with characters from 7Q5:

ου γαρ

συνηκαν **ε**πι τοις αρτοις,
αλλ ην α**υτων η** καρδια πεπωρω-
μεν**η. και δι**απερασαντες [επι την γην]
ηλθον εις γε**ννησ**αρετ και
προσωρμισ**θησα**ν. και εξελ-
θοντων αυτων εκ του πλοιου ευθυς

επιγνοντες αυτον.
hou gar

synēkan **e**pi tois artois,
all ēn a**utōn ē** kardia pepōrō-
men**ē. kai di**aperasantes [epi tēn gēn]
ēlthon eis ge**nnēs**aret kai
prosōrmis**thēsa**n. kai exel-
thontōn autōn ek tou ploiou euthys

epignontes auton.

for they did not
understand concerning the loaves
but was their heart harden-
ed. And crossing over [unto the land]
they came unto Gennesaret and
drew to the shore. And com-
ing forth out of the boat immediately
they recognized him.

== Argument ==
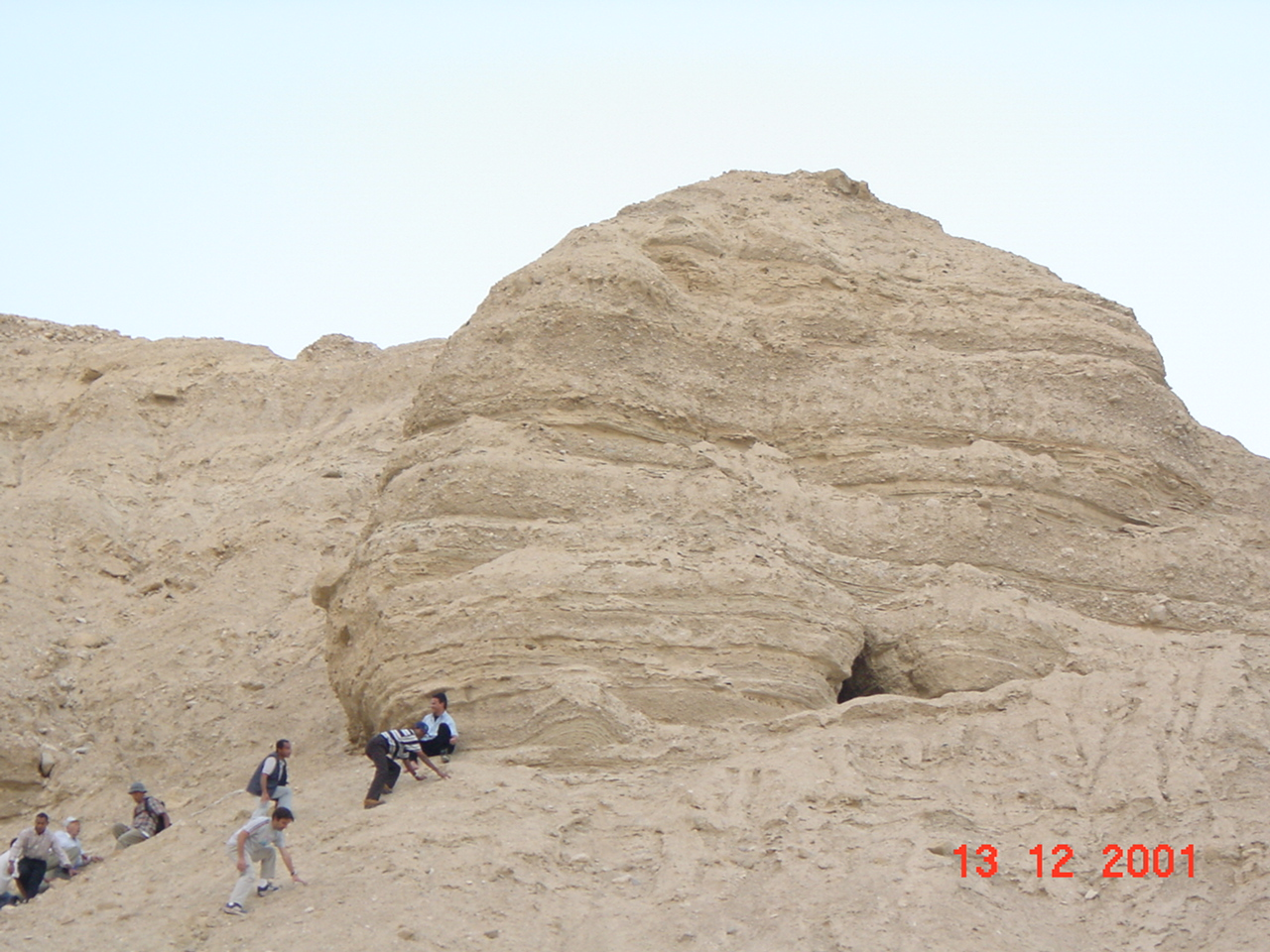
The 7th Cave at Qumran, where 7Q5 was found.

O'Callaghan's argument is as follows:

1. According to O'Callaghan, in line 2 "after the ⲱ, the ⲁ suggested by the editors seems inadmissible. The traces of the facsimile are too uncertain to allow a satisfactory reading, even though one comes to discover the left vertical stroke and the peculiar descending contour of a ⲛ similar to that of line 4." By reading a nu after the omega, O'Callaghan was able to reconstruct the words [α]υτων η [καρδια], which could be matched with a passage in Mark's gospel.
2. O'Callaghan pointed out that the combination of letters ννησ <nnēs> in line 4 may be part of the word Γεννησαρετ <Gennēsaret>.
3. O'Callaghan argued that the spacing before the word και <kai> ("and") suggests a paragraph break, which is consistent with the normative layout for Mark 6:52-53.
4. Furthermore, a computer search "using the most elaborate Greek texts ... has failed to yield any text other than Mark 6:52-53 for the combination of letters identified by O'Callaghan et al. in 7Q5".

The reasons why most scholars have rejected O'Callaghan's arguments include the following:

- Several of the letters read or reconstructed by O'Callaghan are highly debatable (especially the nu in line 2).
- The spacing before the word και <kai> ("and") proposed as a paragraph break may not be indicative of anything.
- In papyri spacings of this width can be also found within words (Pap. Bodmer XXIV, plate 26; in Qumran in fragment 4Q122).
- Other examples in the Qumran texts show that the word και <kai> ("and") usually was separated with spacings – and this has nothing to do with the text's structure (as proposed by O'Callaghan).
- The sequence ννησ can be also found in the word εγεννησεν <egennēsen> ("begot"), a very common word used in biblical genealogies and the reconstruction suggested by the original editor.

Further counterarguments

- To make the identification of the fragment with Mark 6:52-53, O'Callaghan had to substitute a δ (delta) ⟨d⟩ for the τ (tau) ⟨t⟩ found in line 3 of 7Q5, a substitution most scholars do not accept, although it is not without precedent in the ancient world.
- To make 7Q5 'fit' Mark 6:52-53, the words επι την γην <epi tēn gēn> ("to the land") in line 4, which are found in Mark 6:53, would have to be considered as being omitted from 7Q5 in order to fit into its column. However, this omission is found in no extant manuscripts of Mark's Gospel.
- The identification of the last letter in line 2 with nu does not fit into the pattern of this Greek letter as it is clearly written in line 4.
- The computer search performed by Thiede assumed that all the disputed letter identifications made by O'Callaghan were correct, an assumption which is rejected by scholars.
  - A similar search performed by scholar Daniel Wallace, which allowed other identifications for the disputed letters, found sixteen matches.
  - A computer search performed with the undisputed letters of the fragment 7Q5 does not find the text Mk 6:52-53, because the undisputed letter τ in line 3 does not fit to this text.

Anachronism found in Mark's Gospel

- Another problem with identifying 7Q5 as Mark's gospel is the argument that Mark 12:13–17 may potentially contain a reference to Vespasian's Fiscus Judaicus imposed in 71 AD, meaning the gospel had to be written after this date, while 7Q5 dates to before 50 AD.

== Significance ==
If 7Q5 was actually a fragment of Mark 6:52–53 and was deposited in the cave at Qumran by 68 AD, it would become the earliest known fragment of the New Testament, predating P52 by at least some if not many decades. Yet, since the amount of text in the manuscript is so small, even a confirmation of 7Q5 as Markan "might mean nothing more than that the contents of these few verses were already formalized, not necessarily that there was a manuscript of Mark's Gospel on hand". Since the entirety of the find in Cave 7 consists of fragments in Greek, it is possible that the contents of this cave are of a separate "Hellenized" library than the Hebrew texts found in the other caves.

== See also ==
- 4Q108
- 4QMMT
- List of New Testament papyri
- List of New Testament uncials
