= 7Q1 =

Septuagint manuscript

Dead Sea Scrolls manuscript 7Q1 (also known as AT18, Åland AT18, 7QpapLXXExod, 7Q papLXXExodus, with TM 62295 and LDAB 3456 reference numbers) is an early fragmentary manuscript of the Greek Bible containing verses from the Book of Exodus 28:4–7, written on papyrus. Using the study of comparative writing styles (palaeography), it has been dated to the hasmonean period, about late 2nd-early 1st century BCE (BC 125 - 75).

== Description ==
The manuscript has approximately 20 letters per line, however no margins are preserved it is estimated to have been at around 5.4 centimetres wide. Two fragments of the Book of Exodus 20 have been identified. It was written with the Greek uncial script.

=== Text ===
The text is closer to the Masoretic Text of the Hebrew Bible than to biblical scholar John William Wevers's reconstructed text of the Septuagint, labelled the G text: "Wevers concludes that 7Q1 reflects early recensional activity towards the Hebrew (Wevers 1992, 40), whereas Lange concludes there is not enough text preserved for text-typological analysis". Emanuel Tov states: "In some details 7QpapLXXExod is closer to MT than the main LXX tradition, while in other instances it is further removed from it".

=== Treatment to the name of God ===
Because of its short text due to its fragmentary condition, this manuscript presents no evidence for the writing of the tetragrammaton for the name of God.

== Location ==
The manuscript is currently housed in the Rockefeller Museum (Gr. 789 [7Q1]) in Jerusalem, Israel, at the Leon Levy Dead Sea Scrolls Digital Library.

== Sources ==
- "TM 62295 / LDAB 3456".
- "papLXXExodus, 7Q1 - 7Q papLXXExod".
- Longacre, Drew (2014). A Contextualized Approach to the Hebrew Dead Sea Scrolls containing Exodus (PDF) (University of Birmingham diss. PhD).
- Longacre, Drew (2022). "Exodus in the Second Temple Period". In Ehorn, Seth M. (ed.). Exodus in the New Testament. The Library of New Testament Studies. Bloomsbury Publishing. pp. 24–26. ISBN 9780567702807.
- Meyer, Anthony R. (2017). The divine name in early Judaism Anthony Meyer (PDF).
- Tov, Emanuel (2008). "The Greek Biblical Texts from the Judean Desert". Hebrew Bible, Greek Bible, and Qumran. Collected Essays. Texts and Studies in Ancient Judaism. Vol. 121. Mohr Siebeck GmbH & Co. KG. doi:10.1628/978-3-16-151454-8. ISBN 978-3-16-151454-8.
