= Matthew 15:27 =

- ← 15:26 15:28 →
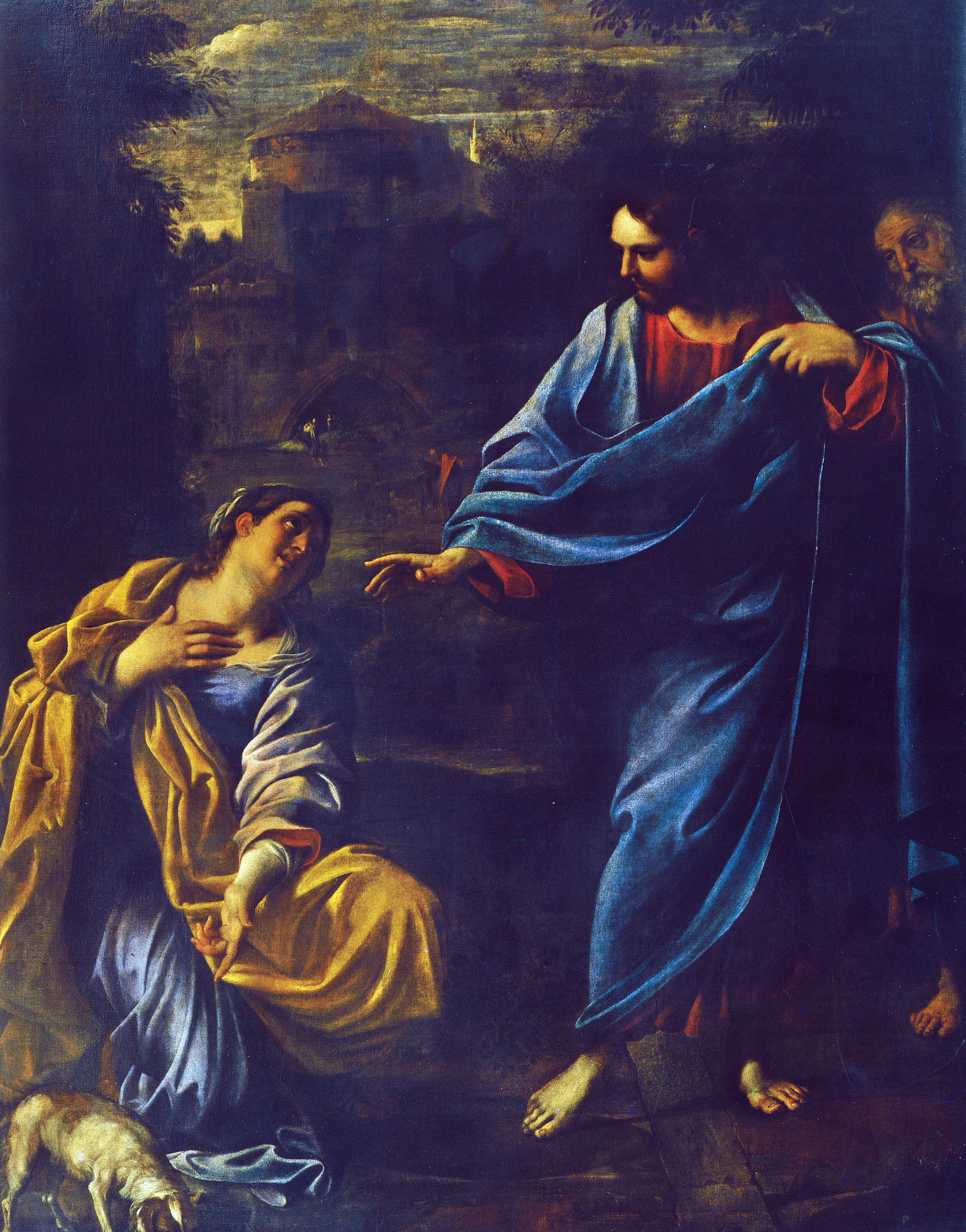
- Christ and the Canaanite Woman (1594-1595) by Annibale Carracci
- Book: Gospel of Matthew
- Christian Bible part: New Testament

Matthew 15:27 is a verse in the fifteenth chapter of the Gospel of Matthew in the New Testament.

== Content ==
In the original Greek according to Westcott-Hort, this verse is:

Ἡ δὲ εἶπε, Ναί, Κύριε· καὶ γὰρ τὰ κυνάρια ἐσθίει ἀπὸ τῶν ψιχίων τῶν πιπτόντων ἀπὸ τῆς τραπέζης τῶν κυρίων αὐτῶν.

In the King James Version of the Bible the text reads:

And she said, Truth, Lord: yet the dogs eat of the crumbs which fall from their masters’ table.

The New International Version translates the passage as:

"Yes, Lord," she said, "but even the dogs eat the crumbs that fall from their masters' table."

== Analysis ==
The woman humbly perseveres in her aim, "Yes Lord." Agreeing that she is a worthless dog; and that to such a one the bread of children is not to be cast, still even in this low estate, she claims the need to be attended to.

She did not ask for an abundance of bread. The miraculous cure she looked for was only "a crumb", in contrast to the many splendid miracles done among the Jews, which Jesus calls children, but she reverently calls her masters. MacEvilly says that it is as if she said, "nourish me, therefore, as whelps are nourished, with a crumb of the bread that falls from my masters' table."

In the Greek text and in many English translations, "their masters' table" combines the singular (table) with the plural (masters). The International Standard Version has tables (plural). Some paraphrases offer "their master's table" (both singular), for example J. B. Phillips' New Testament.

| Preceded by Matthew 15:26 | Gospel of Matthew; Chapter 15 | Succeeded by Matthew 15:28 |
