= Matthew 15:24 =

- ← 15:23 15:25 →
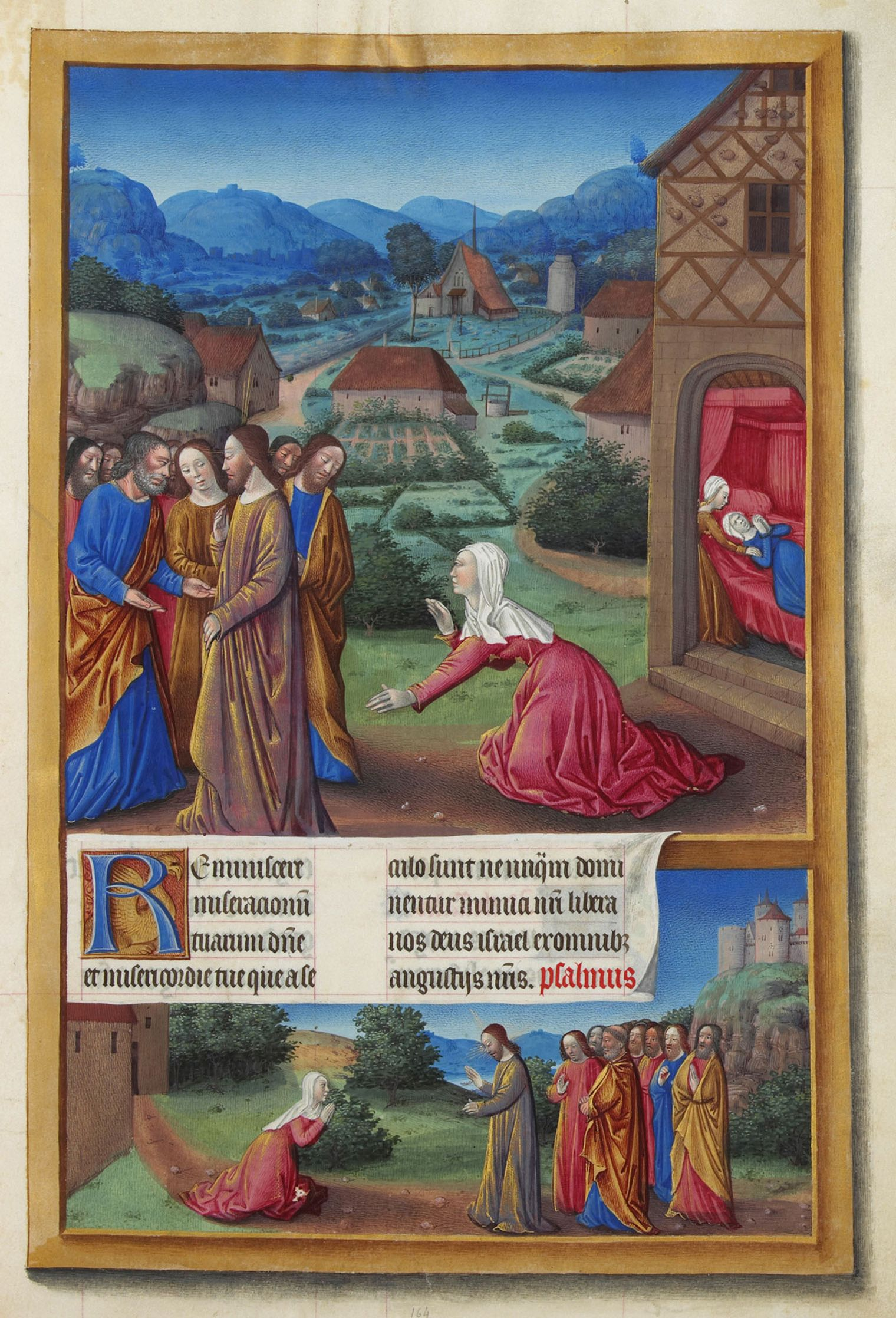
- Jesus exorcising the Canaanite Woman's daughter from Très Riches Heures du Duc de Berry, 15th century.
- Book: Gospel of Matthew
- Christian Bible part: New Testament

Matthew 15:24 is a verse in the fifteenth chapter of the Gospel of Matthew in the New Testament.

== Content ==
In the original Greek according to Westcott-Hort, this verse is:

Ὁ δὲ ἀποκριθεὶς εἶπεν, Οὐκ ἀπεστάλην εἰ μὴ εἰς τὰ πρόβατα τὰ ἀπολωλότα οἴκου Ἰσραήλ.

In the King James Version of the Bible the text reads:

But he answered and said, I am not sent but unto the lost sheep of the house of Israel.

The New International Version translates the passage as:

He answered, "I was sent only to the lost sheep of Israel."

== Analysis ==
Jesus states here that he was sent, literally that He is an Apostle for Jews, in accord with the prediction of the prophets. This was done so there would be no pretext for the Jews rejecting Him as the promised Messiah (see Rom. 15:8, 9).

Shortly after this, the woman’s daughter is healed because her faith was so great (Matthew 15:28), despite not being Jewish.

Charles Ellicott believes that the "lost sheep of Israel" refers to the Israelites lacking proper leadership. John Gill believes it refers to the elect Jews that are unable to naturally turn to Christ due to their fallen state.

== Commentary from the Church Fathers ==
Jerome: "He says that He is not sent to the Gentiles, but that He is sent first to Israel, so that when they would not receive the Gospel, the passing over to the Gentiles might have just cause."

Saint Remigius: "In this way also He was sent specially to the Jews, because He taught them by His bodily presence."

Jerome: "And He adds of the house of Israel, with this design, that we might rightly interpret by this place that other parable concerning the stray sheep."

Preceded by Matthew 15:23	Gospel of Matthew; Chapter 15	Succeeded by Matthew 15:25
