= Matthew 15:10 =

- ← 15:9 15:11 →
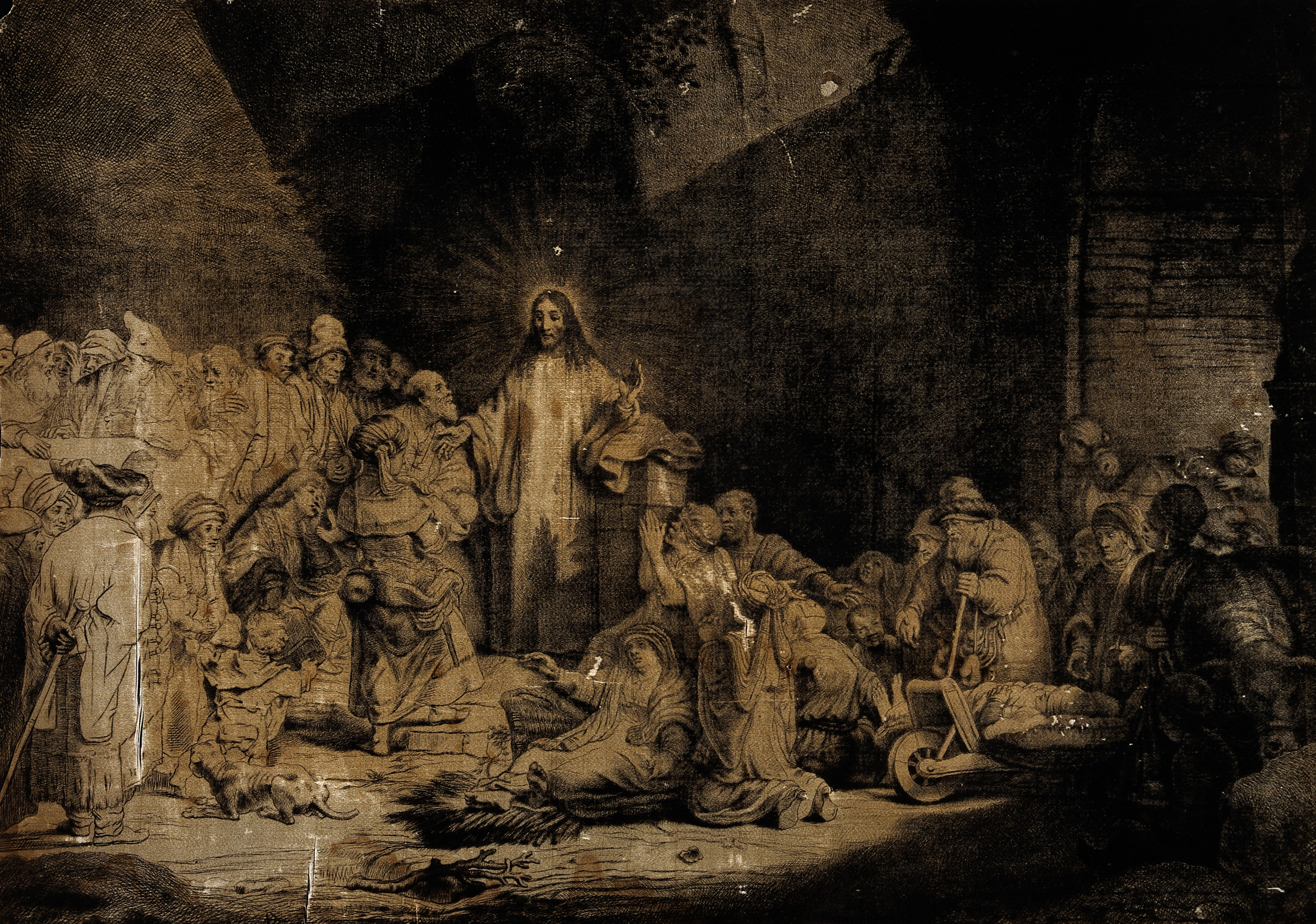
- "Christ amongst the sick and the Pharisees" ('The hundred guilder print'). Etching by T.W., 1758, after Rembrandt, 1649.
- Book: Gospel of Matthew
- Christian Bible part: New Testament

Matthew 15:10 is the tenth verse in the fifteenth chapter of the Gospel of Matthew in the New Testament.

== Content ==
In the original Greek according to Westcott-Hort for this verse is:

Καὶ προσκαλεσάμενος τὸν ὄχλον, εἶπεν αὐτοῖς, Ἀκούετε καὶ συνίετε.

In the King James Version of the Bible the text reads:

And he called the multitude, and said unto them, Hear, and understand:

The New International Version translates the passage as:

Jesus called the crowd to him and said, "Listen and understand.

== Analysis ==
For "hear" Mark has, "hear Me all of you." (Mark 7:14). These words are intended to grab their attention, by saying, hear Me, and not the Pharisees; "and understand," that is, leaving your former errors, be attentive to My true doctrine.

== Commentary from the Church Fathers ==
Chrysostom: "Having added weight to His accusation of the Pharisees by the testimony of the Prophet, and not having amended them, He now ceases to speak to them, and turns to the multitudes, And he called the multitude, and said unto them, Hear and understand. Because He was about to set before them a high dogma, and full of much philosophy, He does not utter it nakedly, but so frames His speech that it should be received by them. First, by exhibiting anxiety on their account, which the Evangelist expresses by the words, And he called the multitude to him. Secondly, the time He chooses recommends His speech; after the victory He has just gained over the Pharisees. And He not merely calls the multitude to Him, but rouses their attention by the words, Hear and understand; that is, Attend, and give your minds to what ye are to hear. But He said not unto them, The observance of meats is nought; nor, Moses bade you wrongly; but in the way of warning and advice, drawing His testimony from natural things, Not what entereth in at the mouth defileth a man, but what goeth forth of the mouth that defileth a man."

| Preceded by Matthew 15:9 | Gospel of Matthew; Chapter 15 | Succeeded by Matthew 15:11 |
