= Matthew 15:25 =

- ← 15:24 15:26 →
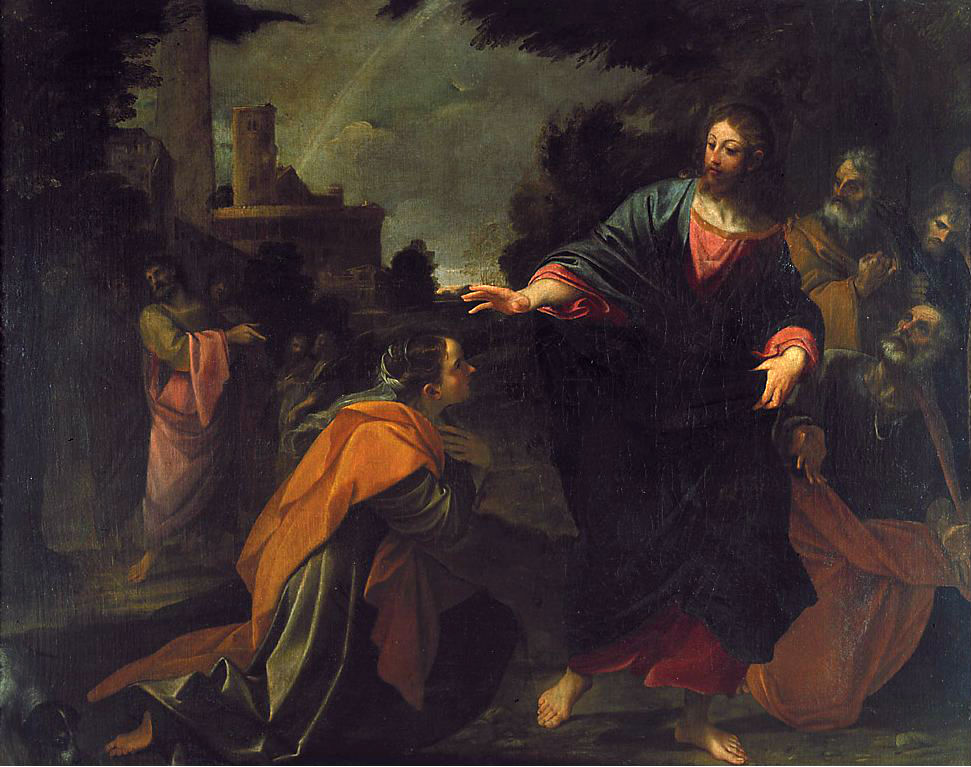
- Ludovico Carracci, Christ and the Canaanite Woman, circa 1593, Pinacoteca di Brera, Milan
- Book: Gospel of Matthew
- Christian Bible part: New Testament

Matthew 15:25 is a verse in the fifteenth chapter of the Gospel of Matthew in the New Testament.

== Content ==
In the original Greek according to Westcott-Hort, this verse is:

Ἡ δὲ ἐλθοῦσα προσεκύνηει αὐτῷ λέγουσα, Κύριε, βοήθει μοι.

In the King James Version of the Bible the text reads:

Then came she and worshipped him, saying, Lord, help me.

The New International Version (NIV) translates the passage as:

The woman came and knelt before him. "Lord, help me!" she said.

== Analysis ==
Strangely the woman's faith and humility are more inflamed by the rejection she met with in the first instance. So, coming forward and falling down (the NIV has "knelt"), worshipped Him. And so she makes her petition with still more earnestness.

The moral lesson here seems to be that God, when He is invoked, often does not answer at first, in order that the one who is praying may be yet more earnest. That God will not refuse anything to those who persevere, is plain from this example.

== Commentary from the Church Fathers ==
Chrysostom: "But when the woman saw that the Apostles had no power, she became bold with commendable boldness; for before she had not dared to come before His sight; but, as it is said, She crieth after us. But when it seemed that she must now retire without being relieved, she came nearer, But she came and worshipped him."

Jerome: "Note how perseveringly this Chananæan woman calls Him first Son of David, then Lord, and lastly came and worshipped him, as God."

Preceded by Matthew 15:24	Gospel of Matthew; Chapter 15	Succeeded by Matthew 15:26
