= Matthew 15:29-31 =

- ← 15:28 15:32 →
- Book: Gospel of Matthew
- Christian Bible part: New Testament

Matthew 15:29-31 is a set of verses in the fifteenth chapter of the Gospel of Matthew in the New Testament.

== Content ==
In the original Greek according to Westcott-Hort, these verses are:

29:Καὶ μεταβὰς ἐκεῖθεν ὁ Ἰησοῦς ἦλθε παρὰ τὴν θάλασσαν τῆς Γαλιλαίας· καὶ ἀναβὰς εἰς τὸ ὄρος ἐκάθητο ἐκεῖ.
30:Καὶ προσῆλθον αὐτῷ ὄχλοι πολλοί, ἔχοντες μεθ᾿ ἑαυτῶν χωλούς, τυφλούς, κωφούς, κυλλούς, καὶ ἑτέρους πολλούς, καὶ ἔρριψαν αὐτοὺς παρὰ τοὺς πόδας τοῦ Ἰησοῦ καὶ ἐθεράπευσεν αὐτούς·
31:ὥστε τοὺς ὄχλους θαυμάσαι, βλέποντας κωφοὺς λαλοῦντας, κυλλοὺς ὑγιεῖς, χωλοὺς περιπατοῦντας, καὶ τυφλοὺς βλέποντας· καὶ ἐδόξασαν τὸν Θεὸν Ἰσραήλ.

In the King James Version of the Bible the text reads:

29:And Jesus departed from thence, and came nigh unto the sea of Galilee; and went up into a mountain, and sat down there.
30:And great multitudes came unto him, having with them those that were lame, blind, dumb, maimed, and many others, and cast them down at Jesus’ feet; and he healed them:
31:Insomuch that the multitude wondered, when they saw the dumb to speak, the maimed to be whole, the lame to walk, and the blind to see: and they glorified the God of Israel.

The New International Version translates the passage as:

29:Jesus left there and went along the Sea of Galilee. Then he went up on a mountainside and sat down.
30:Great crowds came to him, bringing the lame, the blind, the crippled, the mute and many others, and laid them at his feet; and he healed them.
31:The people were amazed when they saw the mute speaking, the crippled made well, the lame walking and the blind seeing. And they praised the God of Israel.

== Analysis ==
Cornelius a Lapide refers to Peter Chrysologus (Serm. 50): “Christ came to take our infirmities, and to give us His strength; to seek things human, to give things divine; to receive injuries, to confer dignities; to bear wearisomeness, to bestow healing. For the physician, who does not bear with infirmities, knows not how to heal. And he who is not weak with the weak, cannot make the weak strong.”

John McEvilly notes that "He sat there" in order to wait for the people to flock to Him. He also notes that the people were seized with admiration, because the prophecy of Isaias 35:5 was being fulfilled, "then shall be opened the eyes of the blind", etc.

== Commentary from the Church Fathers ==
Jerome: "Having healed the daughter of this Chananæan, the Lord returns into Judæa, as it follows, And Jesus departed from thence, and came nigh unto the sea of Galilee.

Saint Remigius: "This sea is called by various names; the sea of Galilee, because of its neighbourhood to Galilee; the sea of Tiberias, from the town of Tiberias. And going up into a mountain, he sat down there.

Chrysostom: "It should be considered that sometimes the Lord goes about to heal the sick, sometimes He sits and waits for them to come; and accordingly here it is added, And there came great multitudes unto him, having with them those that were dumb, lame, blind, maimed, and many others.

Jerome: "What the Latin translator calls ‘debiles’ (maimed), is in the Greek χυλλοὺς which is not a general term for a maimed person, but a peculiar species, as he that is lame in one foot is called ‘claudus’, so he that is crippled in one hand is called χυλλός.

Chrysostom: "These shewed their faith in two points especially, in that they went up the mountain, and in that they believed that they had need of nothing beyond but to cast themselves at Jesus’ feet; for they do not now touch the hem even of His garment, but have attained to a loftier faith; And cast them down at Jesus’ feet. The woman’s daughter He healed with great slackness, that He might shew her virtue; but to these He administers healing immediately, not because they were better than that woman, but that He might stop the mouths of the unbelieving Jews, as it follows, and he healed them all. But the multitude of those that were healed, and the ease with which it was done, struck them with astonishment.

Jerome: "He said nothing concerning the maimed, because there was no one word which was the opposite of this.

Rabanus Maurus: "Mystically; Having in the daughter of this Chauanæan prefigured the salvation of the Gentiles, He came into Judæa; because, when the fulness of the Gentiles shall have entered in, then shall all Israel be saved. (Rom. 11:25.)

Glossa Ordinaria: "(ap. Anselm.) The sea near to which Jesus came signifies the turbid swellings of this world; it is the sea of Galilee when men pass from virtue to vice.

Jerome: "He goes up into the mountain, that as a bird He may entice the tender nestlings to fly.

Rabanus Maurus: "Thus raising his hearers to meditate on heavenly things. He sat down there to shew that rest is not to be sought but in heavenly things. And as He sits on the mountain, that is, in the heavenly height, there come unto Him multitudes of the faithful, drawing near to Him with devoted mind, and bringing to Him the dumb, and the blind, & c. and cast them down at Jesus’ feet; because they that confess their sins are brought to be healed by Him alone. These He so heals, that the multitudes marvel and magnify the God of Israel; because the faithful when they see those that have been spiritually sick richly endued with all manner of works of virtuousness, sing praise to God.

Glossa Ordinaria: "(ord.) The dumb are they that do not praise God; the blind, they who do not understand the paths of life; the deaf, they that obey not; the lame, they that walk not firmly through the difficult ways of good works; the maimed, they that are crippled in their good works.

Preceded by Matthew 15:28	Gospel of Matthew; Chapter 15	Succeeded by Matthew 15:32
