= Matthew 15:11 =

- ← 15:10 15:12 →
- Book: Gospel of Matthew
- Christian Bible part: New Testament

Matthew 15:11 is a verse in the fifteenth chapter of the Gospel of Matthew in the New Testament.

== Content ==
In the original Greek according to Westcott-Hort for this verse is:

Οὐ τὸ εἰσερχόμενον εἰς τὸ στόμα κοινοῖ τὸν ἄνθρωπον· ἀλλὰ τὸ ἐκπορευόμενον ἐκ τοῦ στόματος, τοῦτο κοινοῖ τὸν ἄνθρωπον.

In the King James Version of the Bible the text reads:

Not that which goeth into the mouth defileth a man; but that which cometh out of the mouth, this defileth a man.

The New International Version translates the passage as:

What goes into a man's mouth does not make him 'unclean,' but what comes out of his mouth, that is what makes him 'unclean.'"

The New Living Translation translates the passage as:

It’s not what goes into your mouth that defiles you;you are defiled by the words that come out of your mouth".

== Analysis ==
The Pharisees maintained, that, by partaking of food with unwashed hands, defilement was imparted to the food, and this food defiled the soul. Jesus refutes this by saying, that no food, of itself, can defile someone. The Pharisees held that certain kinds of food, defile a person, and make him polluted before God. So, we find St. Paul, in refuting these doctrines, saying, "every creature of God is good." Jesus appears to be stating that we do not sin by partaking of food, if we do so, contrary to the prohibition of God, as did Adam; or, as the Jews would, by partaking of food forbidden to them; or, the first Christians, had they violated the Apostolical injunction, commanding them to abstain from blood, (Acts 15:20). And so it is not what goes into the mouth that defiles; but what comes from it, that is disobedience and resistance to the law of God. (see Mark 7:20)

== Commentary from the Church Fathers ==
Jerome: "The word here ‘makes a man common’ is peculiar to Scripture, and is not hackneyed in common parlance. The Jewish nation, boasting themselves to be a part of God, call those meats common, of which all men partake; for example, swine’s flesh, shell fish, hares, and those species of animals that do not divide the hoof, and chew the cud, and among the fish such as have not scales. Hence in the Acts of the Apostles we read, What God hath cleansed, that call not thou common. (Acts 10:15.) Common then in this sense is that which is free to the rest of mankind, and as though not in part of God, is therefore called unclean."

Augustine: " This declaration of the Lord, Not that which entereth into the mouth defileth a man, is not contrary to the Old Testament. As the Apostle also speaks, To the pure all things are pure; (Tit. 1:15.) and Every creature of God is good. Let the Manichæans understand, (1 Tim. 4:4.) if they can, that the Apostle said this of the very natures and qualities of things; while that letter (of the ritual law) declared certain animals unclean, not in their nature but typically, for certain figures which were needed for a time. Therefore to take an instance in the swine and the lamb, by nature both are clean, because naturally every creature of God is good; but in a certain typical meaning the lamb is clean, and the swine unclean. Take the two words, ‘fool,’ and ‘wise,’ in their own nature, as sounds, or letters, both of them are pure, but one of them because of the meaning attached to it, not because of any thing in its own nature, may be said to be impure. And perhaps what the swine are in typical representation, that among mankind is the fool; and the animal, and this word of two syllables (stultus) signify some one and the same thing. That animal is reckoned unclean in the law because it does not chew the cud; but this is not its fault but its nature. But the men of whom this animal is the emblem, are impure by their own fault, not by nature; they readily hear the words of wisdom, but never think upon them again. Whatever of profit you may hear, to summon this up from the internal region of the memory through the sweetness of recollection into the mouth of thought, what is this but spiritually to chew the cud? They who do not this are represented by this species of animal. Such resemblances as these in speech, or in ceremonies, having figurative signification, profitably and pleasantly move the rational mind; but by the former people, many such things were not only to be heard, but to be kept as precepts. For that was a time when it behoved not in words only, but in deeds, to prophesy those things which hereafter were to be revealed. When these had been revealed through Christ, and in Christ, the burdens of observances were not imposed on the faith of the Gentiles; but the authority of the prophecy was yet confirmed. But I ask of the Manichæans, whether this declaration of the Lord, when He said that a man is not defiled by what enters into his mouth, is true or false? If false, why then does their doctor Adimantus bring it forward against the Old Testament? If true, why contrary to its tenor do they consider that they are thus defiled?"

Jerome: "The thoughtful reader may here object and say, If that which entereth into the mouth defileth not a man, why do we not feed on meats offered to idols? Be it known then that meats and every creature of God is in itself clean; but the invocation of idols and dæmons makes them unclean with those at least who with conscience of the idol eat that which is offered to idols, and their conscience being weak is polluted, as the Apostle says."

Saint Remigius: "But if any one’s faith be so strong that he understands that God’s creature can in no way be defiled, let him eat what he will, after the food has been hallowed by the word of God and of prayer; yet so that this his liberty be not made an offence to the weak, as the Apostle speaks."

| Preceded by Matthew 15:10 | Gospel of Matthew; Chapter 15 | Succeeded by Matthew 15:12 |
