= Matthew 15:9 =

- ← 15:8 15:10 →
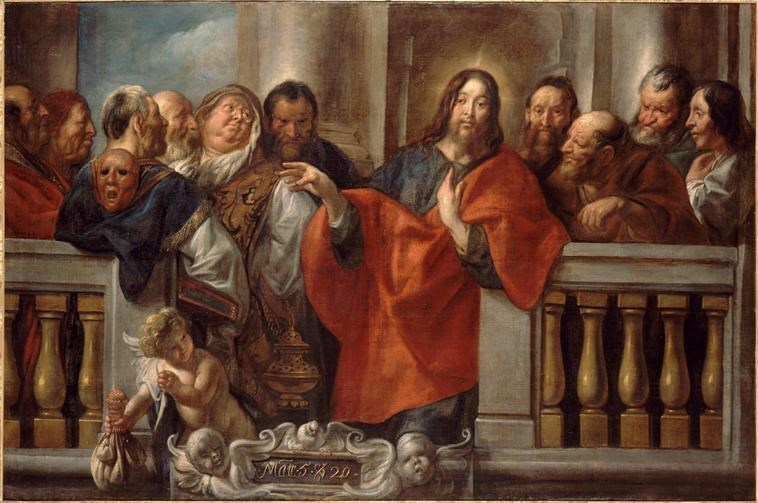
- "Christ among the Pharisees" by Jacob Jordaens (circa 1660).
- Book: Gospel of Matthew
- Christian Bible part: New Testament

Matthew 15:9 is the ninth verse in the fifteenth chapter of the Gospel of Matthew in the New Testament.

== Content ==
In the original Greek according to Westcott-Hort for this verse is:

Μάτην δὲ σέβονταί με, διδάσκοντες διδασκαλίας ἐντάλματα ἀνθρώπων.

In the King James Version of the Bible the text reads:

But in vain they do worship me, teaching for doctrines the commandments of men.

The New International Version translates the passage as:

They worship me in vain; their teachings are but rules taught by men.'"

== Analysis ==
This worship appears to allude to their superstitious observances. While in vain seems to mean that they do not obtain any fruit from their worship. This verse is sometimes used to attack various church traditions. Traditions handed down by the apostles are defended by St. Paul who tells the Thessalonians to honor them (2 Thess 2:14). Other traditions of more modern origin are more debatable, since they may or may not be opposed to the Divine law. The Catholic Church argues that their laws are ordinances enacted under the inspiration of the Holy Ghost.

== Commentary from the Church Fathers ==
Glossa Ordinaria: " Or, they honoured Him in commending outward purity; but in that they lacked the inward which is the true purity, their heart was far from God, and such honour was of no avail to them; as it follows, but without, reason do they worship we, teaching doctrines and commandments of men."

Rabanus Maurus: "Therefore they shall not have their reward with the true worshippers, because they teach doctrines and commandments of men to the contempt of the law of God."

Preceded by Matthew 15:8	Gospel of Matthew; Chapter 15	Succeeded by Matthew 15:10
