= Matthew 15:22 =

- ← 15:21 15:23 →
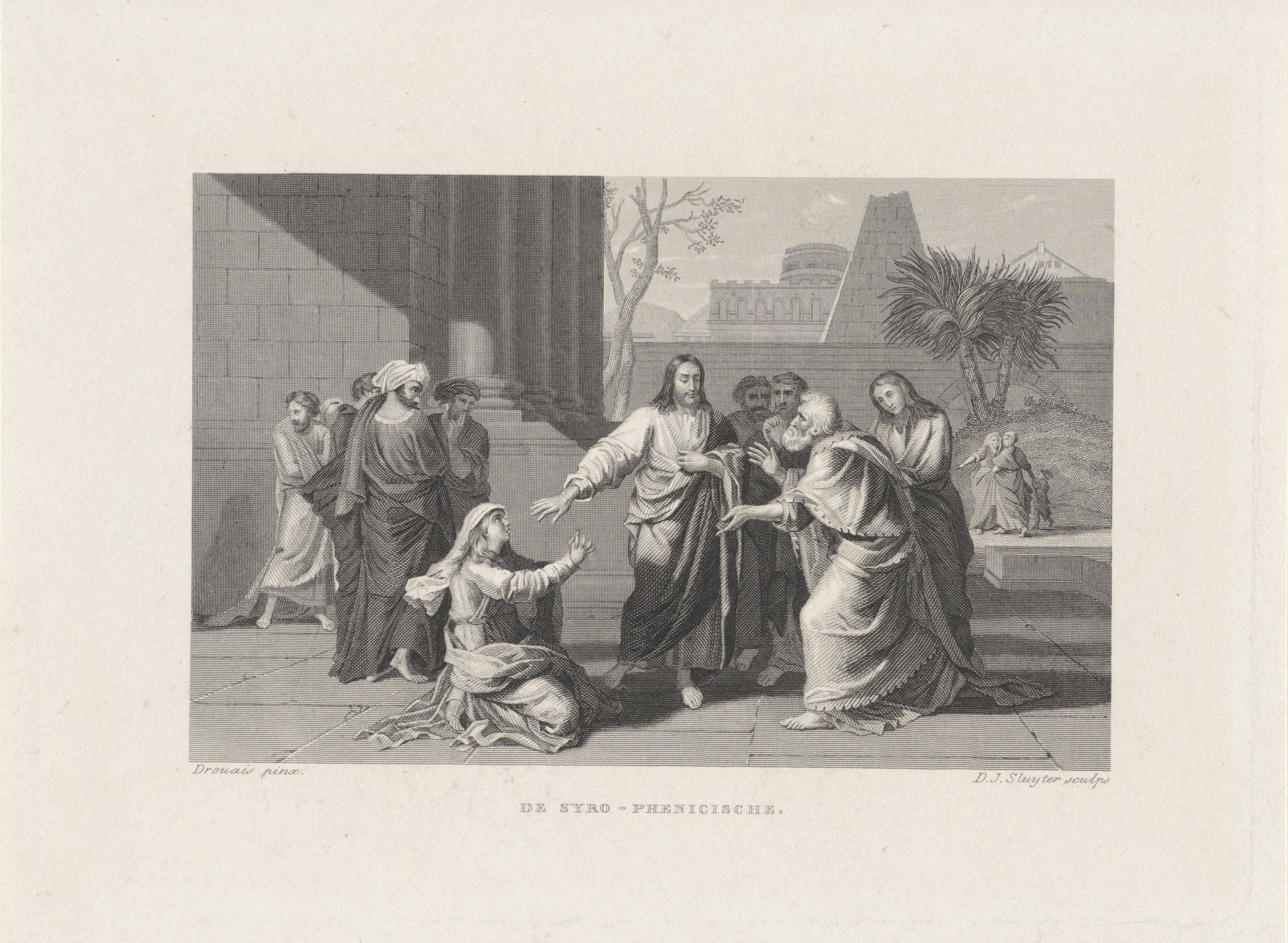
- 'A Canaanite woman kneels before Christ, asking him to heal her daughter' (Matthew 15:21–28; Mark 7:24–30). Print by Dirk Jurriaan Sluyter, based on the painting of Drouais (Amsterdam, 1826–1886).
- Book: Gospel of Matthew
- Christian Bible part: New Testament

Matthew 15:22 is a verse in the fifteenth chapter of the Gospel of Matthew in the New Testament.

== Content ==
In the original Greek according to Westcott-Hort, this verse is:

Καὶ ἰδού, γυνὴ Χαναναία ἀπὸ τῶν ὁρίων ἐκείνων ἐξελθοῦσα ἐκραύγασεν αὐτῷ, λέγουσα, Ἐλέησόν με, Κύριε, υἱὲ Δαβίδ· ἡ θυγάτηρ μου κακῶς δαιμονίζεται.

In the King James Version of the Bible the text reads:

And, behold, a woman of Canaan came out of the same coasts, and cried unto him, saying, Have mercy on me, O Lord, thou Son of David; my daughter is grievously vexed with a devil.

The New International Version translates the passage as:

A Canaanite woman from that vicinity came to him, crying out, "Lord, Son of David, have mercy on me! My daughter is suffering terribly from demon-possession."

== Analysis ==
This woman was a Gentile and Phoenician (see Mark 7:26). She is said to have been a Chanaanite, one of the descendants of Chanaan, the son of Cham, and grandson of Noah. The Phoenicians and Chanaanites were the same people, but were called Chanaanites, by the Hebrews, and Phoenicians, by the Greeks. The woman called a "Syro-Phoenician", (Mark 7:26) since she came from the part of Phoenicia that was part of Syria. "Have mercy on me" shows that the woman full bore the affliction of her daughter. Her great faith is shown by the fact that she believed He could cast out devils.

== Commentary from the Church Fathers ==
Chrysostom: "The Evangelist says that she was a Chananæan, to show the power of Christ’s presence. For this nation, which had been driven out that they might not corrupt the Jews, now showed themselves wiser than the Jews, leaving their own borders that they might go to Christ. And when she came to Him, she asked only for mercy, as it follows, She cried unto Him, saying, Have mercy on me, Lord, thou Son of David."

Glossa Ordinaria: "The great faith of this Chananæan woman is herein showed. She believes Him to be God, in that she calls Him Lord; and man, in that she calls Him Son of David. She claims nothing of her own desert, but craves only God’s mercy. And she says not, Have mercy on my daughter, but Have mercy on me; because the affliction of the daughter is the affliction of the mother. And the more to excite His compassion, she declares to Him the whole of her grief, My daughter is sore vexed by a dœmon; thus unfolding to the Physician the wound, and the extent and nature of the disease; its extent, when she says is sore vexed; its nature, by a dæmon."

Chrysostom: "Note the wisdom (ΦιλθσόΦιαν) of this woman, she went not to men who promised fair, she sought not useless bandages, but leaving all devilish charms, she came to the Lord. She asked not James, she did not pray John, or apply to Peter, but putting herself under the protection of penitence, she ran alone to the Lord. But, behold, a new trouble. She makes her petition, raising her voice into a shout, and God, the lover of mankind, answers not a word."

Preceded by Matthew 15:21	Gospel of Matthew; Chapter 15	Succeeded by Matthew 15:23
