= Matthew 15:1 =

- ← 14:36 15:2 →
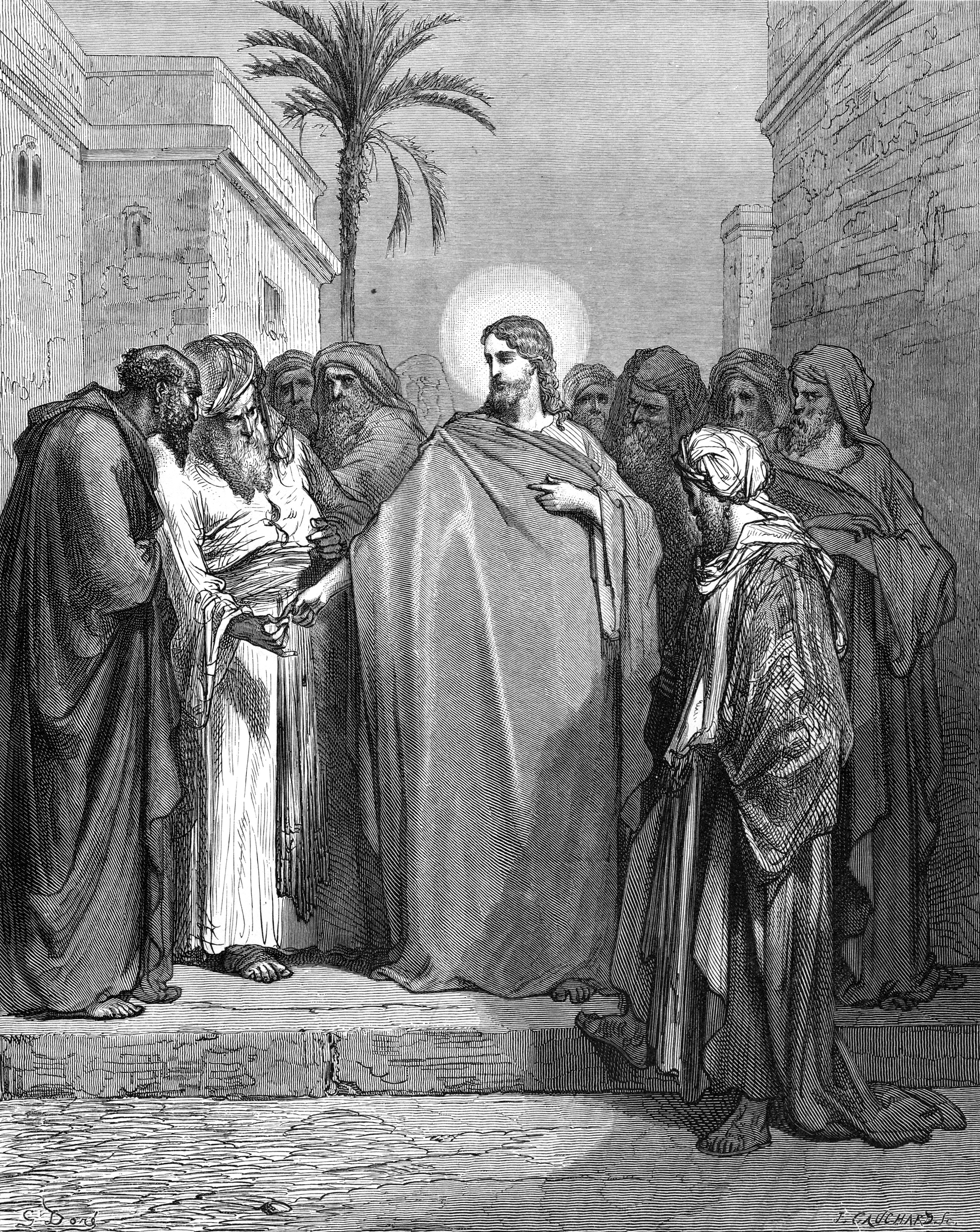
- "Dispute of Jesus and the Pharisees over tribute money" by Gustave Doré (1866).
- Book: Gospel of Matthew
- Christian Bible part: New Testament

Matthew 15:1 is a verse in the fifteenth chapter of the Gospel of Matthew in the New Testament.

== Content ==
In the original Greek according to Westcott-Hort, this verse is:

Τότε προσέρχονται τῷ Ἰησοῦ οἱ ἀπὸ Ἱεροσολύμων γραμματεῖς καὶ Φαρισαῖοι, λέγοντες,

In the King James Version of the Bible, the text reads:

Then came to Jesus scribes and Pharisees, which were of Jerusalem, saying,

The New International Version translates the passage as:

Then some Pharisees and teachers of the law came to Jesus from Jerusalem and asked,

== Analysis ==
The Jewish scribes were said to be proud of their knowledge of the law, while the Pharisees were proud of their sanctity. Those from Jerusalem were reputed as being the most learned of all. Theologian Johann Bengel makes the point that these events could not have taken place at the time of the Passover, when the Pharisees and scribes would have been in Jerusalem. John's Gospel notes in connection with the Feeding of the Five Thousand, "the Passover, a feast of the Jews, was near"; in Matthew's Gospel the feeding of the five thousand is recorded in chapter 14 shortly before this event. Henry Alford connects these accounts, suggesting that the Scribes and Pharisees "had come expressly from Jerusalem to watch our Lord: most probably after that Passover which was nigh" at the time when the multitude were fed.

== Commentary from the Church Fathers ==
Rabanus Maurus: "The men of Gennezareth and the less learned believe; but they who seem to be wise come to dispute with Him; according to that, Thou hast hid these things from the wise and prudent, and hast revealed them unto babes. Whence it is said, Then came to him from Jerusalem Scribes and Pharisees."

Augustine: "The Evangelist thus constructs the order of his narrative, Then came unto him, that, as appeared in the passage over the lake, the order of the events that followed that might be shown."

Chrysostom: "For this reason also the Evangelist marks the time that He may show their iniquity overcome by nothing; for they came to Him at a time when He had wrought many miracles, when He had healed the sick by the touch of His hem. That the Scribes and Pharisees are here said to have come from Jerusalem, it should be known that they were dispersed through all the tribes, but those that dwelt in the Metropolis were worse than the others, their higher dignity inspiring them with a greater degree of pride."

Preceded by Matthew 14:35	Gospel of Matthew; Chapter 15	Succeeded by Matthew 15:2
