= Matthew 15:23 =

- ← 15:22 15:24 →
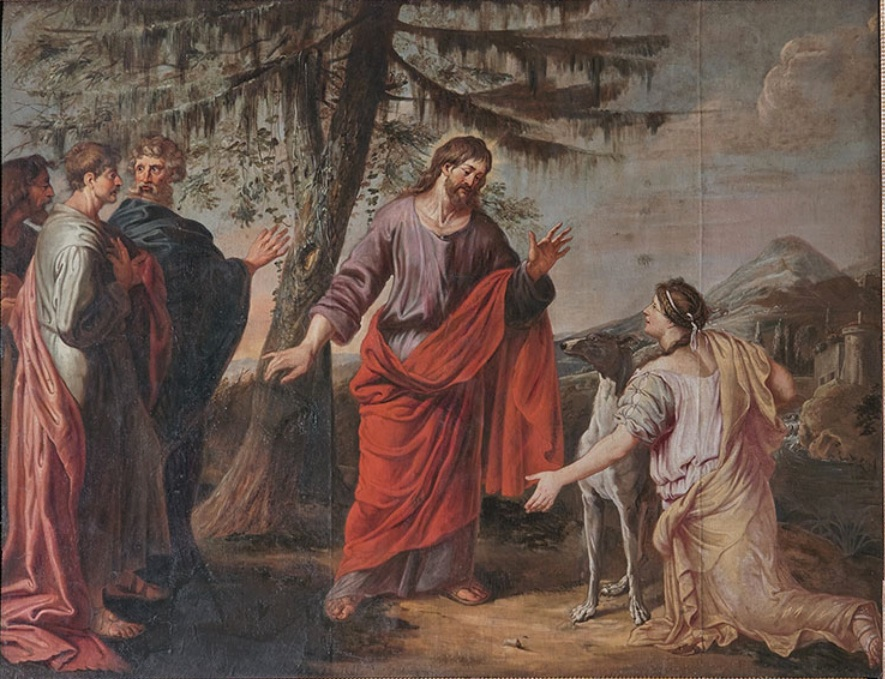
- The Woman of Canaan by Michael Angelo Immenraet, 17th century
- Book: Gospel of Matthew
- Christian Bible part: New Testament

Matthew 15:23 is a verse in the fifteenth chapter of the Gospel of Matthew in the New Testament.

== Content ==
In the original Greek according to Westcott-Hort, this verse is:

Ὁ δὲ οὐκ ἀπεκρίθη αὐτῇ λόγον. Καὶ προσελθόντες οἱ μαθηταὶ αὐτοῦ ἠρώτων αὐτόν, λέγοντες, Ἀπόλυσον αὐτήν, ὅτι κράζει ὄπισθεν ἡμῶν.

In the King James Version of the Bible the text reads:

But he answered her not a word. And his disciples came and besought him, saying, Send her away; for she crieth after us.

The New International Version translates the passage as:

Jesus did not answer a word. So his disciples came to him and urged him, "Send her away, for she keeps crying out after us."

== Analysis ==
Christ made no reply, probably to test her great virtue. Some have postulated that perhaps He wanted to avoid giving His enemies a pretext for accusing Him of having violated His own instructions to His Apostles, to not go to the Gentiles, having done the miracle by moral necessity.

== Commentary from the Church Fathers ==
Jerome: "Not from pharisaical pride, or the superciliousness of the Scribes, but that He might not seem to contravene His own decision, Go not into the way of the Gentiles. For He was unwilling to give occasion to their cavils, and reserved the complete salvation of the Gentiles for the season of His passion and resurrection."

Glossa Ordinaria: "And by this delay in answering, He shows us the patience and perseverance of this woman. And He answered not for this reason also, that the disciples might petition for her; showing herein that the prayers of the Saints are necessary in order to obtain anything, as it follows, And his disciples came unto him, saying, Send her away, for she crieth after us."

Jerome: "The disciples, as yet ignorant of the mysteries of God or moved by compassion, beg for this Chananæan woman; or perhaps seeking to be rid of her importunity."

Augustine: "A question of discrepancy is raised upon this, that Mark says the Lord was in the house when the woman came praying for her daughter. Indeed Matthew might have been understood to have omitted mention of the house, and yet to have been relating the same event; but when he says, that the disciples suggested to the Lord, Send her away, for she crieth after us, he seems to indicate clearly that the woman raised her voice in supplication, in following the Lord who was walking. We must understand then, that, as Mark writes, she entered in where Jesus was, that is, as he had noticed above, in the house; then, that as Matthew writes. He answered her not a word, and during this silence of both sides, Jesus left the house; and then the rest follows without any discordance."

Chrysostom: "I judge that the disciples were sorry for the woman’s affliction, yet dared not say ‘Grant her this mercy,’ but only Send her away, as we, when we would persuade anyone, oftentimes say the very contrary to what we wish. He answered and said, I am not sent but to the lost sheep of the house of Israel."

Preceded by Matthew 15:22	Gospel of Matthew; Chapter 15	Succeeded by Matthew 15:24
