= Matthew 15:26 =

- ← 15:25 15:27 →
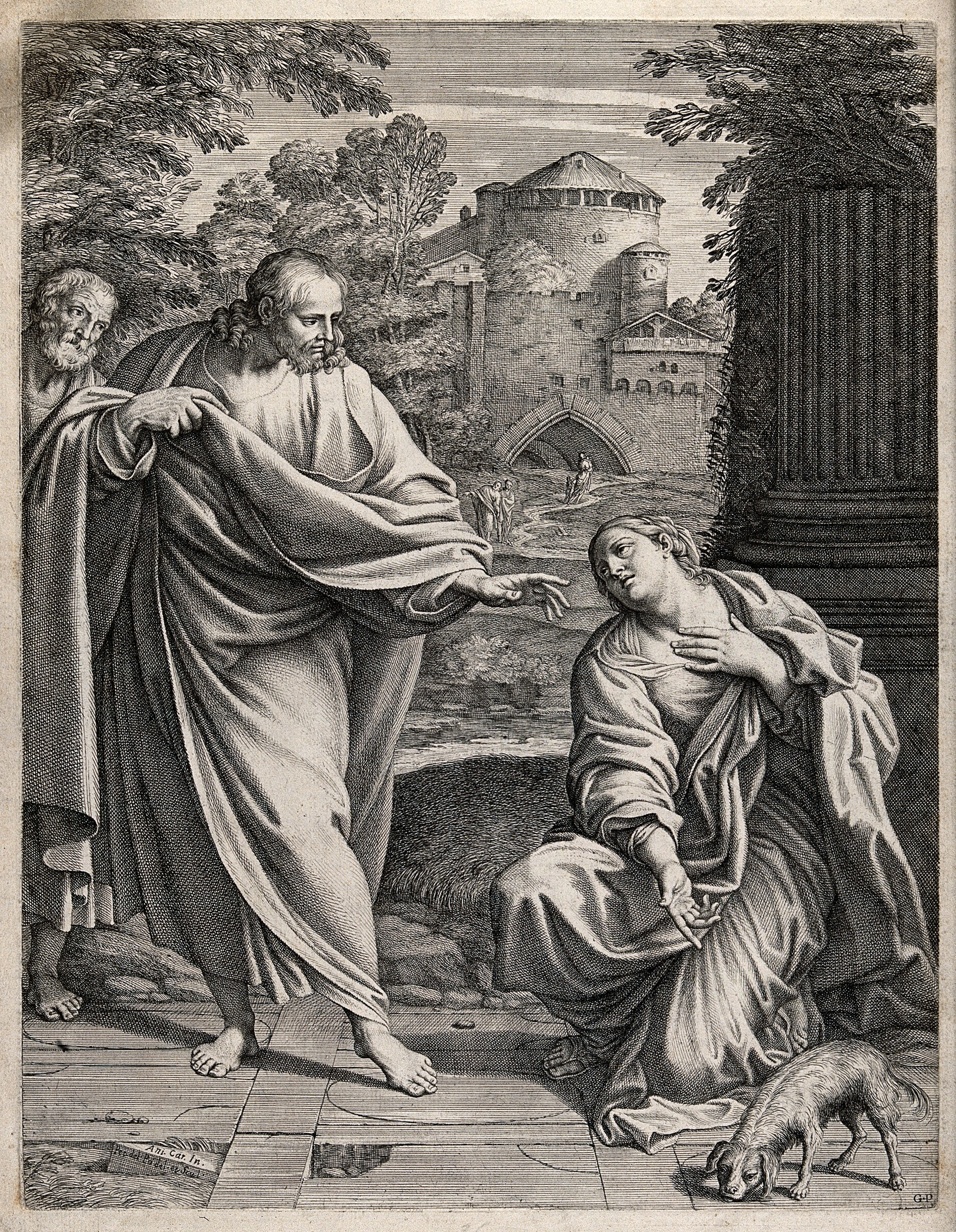
- Etching by Pietro del Po, The Canaanite (or Syrophoenician) woman asks Christ to cure, ca. 1650.
- Book: Gospel of Matthew
- Christian Bible part: New Testament

Matthew 15:26 is a verse in the fifteenth chapter of the Gospel of Matthew in the New Testament.

== Content ==
In the original Greek according to Westcott-Hort, this verse is:

Ὁ δὲ ἀποκριθεὶς εἶπεν, Οὐκ ἔστι καλὸν λαβεῖν τὸν ἄρτον τῶν τέκνων καὶ βαλεῖν τοῖς κυναρίοις.

In the King James Version of the Bible (KJV) the text reads:

But he answered and said, It is not meet to take the children’s bread, and to cast it to dogs.

The New International Version (NIV) translates the passage as:

He replied, "It is not right to take the children's bread and toss it to their dogs."

== Analysis ==
The Jews were considered to be the children of God, while the Jews held the Gentiles to be mere dogs because of their idolatry and sinful behaviour. The Greek word καλὸν (good) is used here which is translated as "meet" in the KJV, and "right" in the NIV. In Mark 7 we find that Jesus says "Suffer first the children to be filled", as if holding out hope for her to be filled next. MacEvilly summarizes Jesus' words as, "Is it fair for Me who am sent specially to the Jews, the chosen children of God, to transfer My miracles, until the Jews are fully satisfied, to the Gentiles, who hold no other place than that of dogs in the family or household of God?"

== Commentary from the Church Fathers ==
Chrysostom: "And therefore she said not Ask, or Pray God for me, but Lord, help me. But the more the woman urged her petition, the more He strengthened His denial; for He calls the Jews now not sheep but sons, and the Gentiles dogs; He answered and said unto her, It is not meet to take the children’s bread, and give it to dogs."

Glossa Ordinaria: "The Jews were born sons, and brought up by the Law in the worship of one God. The bread is the Gospel, its miracles and other things which pertain to our salvation. It is not then meet that these should be taken from the children and given to the Gentiles, who are dogs, till the Jews refuse them."

Jerome: "The Gentiles are called dogs because of their idolatry; who, given to the eating of blood, and dead bodies, turn to madness."

| Preceded by Matthew 15:25 | Gospel of Matthew; Chapter 15 | Succeeded by Matthew 15:27 |
