= Matthew 15:13 =

- ← 15:12 15:14 →
- Book: Gospel of Matthew
- Christian Bible part: New Testament

Matthew 15:13 is a verse in the fifteenth chapter of the Gospel of Matthew in the New Testament.

== Content ==
In the original Greek according to Westcott-Hort for this verse is:

Ὁ δὲ ἀποκριθεὶς εἶπε, Πᾶσα φυτεία, ἣν οὐκ ἐφύτευσεν ὁ πατήρ μου ὁ οὐράνιος, ἐκριζωθήσεται.

In the King James Version of the Bible the text reads:

But he answered and said, Every plant, which my heavenly Father hath not planted, shall be rooted up.

The New International Version translates the passage as:

He replied, "Every plant that my heavenly Father has not planted will be pulled up by the roots.

== Analysis ==
Some people understand the word, "plant," to mean doctrine, so that every doctrine not proceeding from God, will come to nothing. Gamaliel stated this in Acts 5:38, "If this counsel be from God ..." So Christ implies that the doctrine of the Pharisees, is purely of human invention, and along with their sect will come to an end. By doing this Jesus quiets the fear of the disciples related in the previous verse. Some other people understand the word, "plant," to be of men themselves, that is, the Scribes and Pharisees. People are often called the planting of God. Every person is said to be planted by God, in the field of this world, but by the envy of the devil, the first people were corrupted and so they must be planted afresh and ingrafted on Christ, the tree of life. (see Isa. 60:21; Matt 3:10)

== Commentary from the Church Fathers ==
Chrysostom: "Christ does not remove the stumbling-block out of the way of the Pharisees, but rather rebukes them; as it follows, But he answered and said, Every plant which my heavenly Father has not planted shall be rooted up. This Manichæus affirmed was spoken of the Law, but what has been already said is a sufficient refutation of this. For if He had said this of the Law, how would He have above contended for the Law, saying, Why transgress ye the commandment of God through your tradition? Or would He have cited the Prophet? Or how, if God said, Honour thy father and thy mother, is not this, being spoken in the Law, a plant of God?"

Hilary of Poitiers: "What He intends then by a plant not planted of His Father, is that tradition of men under cover of which the Law had been transgressed, this He instructs them must be rooted up."

Saint Remigius: "Every false doctrine and superstitious observance with the workers thereof cannot endure; and because it is not from God the Father, it shall be rooted up with the same. And that only shall endure which is of God."

Jerome: "Shall that plant also be rooted up of which the Apostle says, I planted, Apollos watered? (1 Cor. 3:6.) The question is answered by what follows, but God gave the increase. He says also, Ye are God’s husbandry, a building of God; and in another place, We are workers together of God. And if when Paul plants, and Apollos waters, they are in so doing workers together with God, then God plants and waters together with them. This passage is abused by some who apply it at once to two different kinds of men; they say, ‘If every plant, which the Father hath not planted shall be rooted up, then that which He has planted cannot be rooted up.’ But let them hear these words of Jeremiah, I had planted thee a true vine, wholly a right seed, how then art thou turned into the bitterness of a strange vine? (Jer. 2:21.) God indeed has planted it, and none may root up His planting. But since that planting was through the disposition of the will of him which was planted, none other can root it up unless its own will consents thereto."

Preceded by Matthew 15:12	Gospel of Matthew; Chapter 15	Succeeded by Matthew 15:14
