= Matthew 15:20 =

- ← 15:19 15:21 →
- Book: Gospel of Matthew
- Christian Bible part: New Testament

Matthew 15:20 is a verse in the fifteenth chapter of the Gospel of Matthew in the New Testament.

== Content ==
In the original Greek according to Westcott-Hort, this verse is:

ταῦτά ἐστι τὰ κοινοῦντα τὸν ἄνθρωπον· τὸ δὲ ἀνίπτοις χερσὶ φαγεῖν οὐ κοινοῖ τὸν ἄνθρωπον.

In the King James Version of the Bible the text reads:

These are the things which defile a man: but to eat with unwashen hands defileth not a man.

The New International Version translates the passage as:

These are what make a man 'unclean'; but eating with unwashed hands does not make him 'unclean.'"

== Analysis ==
This is Jesus' conclusion from the previous verses. "These things come out of the mouth" (verse 11). "But to eat with unleashed hands," since such things are among those that go into the mouth (verse 11), "does not defile someone."

== Commentary from the Church Fathers ==
Glossa Ordinaria: " And because these words of the Lord had been occasioned by the iniquity of the Pharisees, who preferred their traditions to the commands of God, He hence concludes that there was no necessity for the foregoing tradition, But to eat with unwashen hands defileth not a man."

Chrysostom: "He said not that to eat the meats forbidden in the Law defiles not a man, that they might not have what to answer to Him again, but He concludes in that concerning which the disputation had been."

Preceded by Matthew 15:19	Gospel of Matthew; Chapter 15	Succeeded by Matthew 15:21
