= Matthew 15:8 =

- ← 15:7 15:9 →
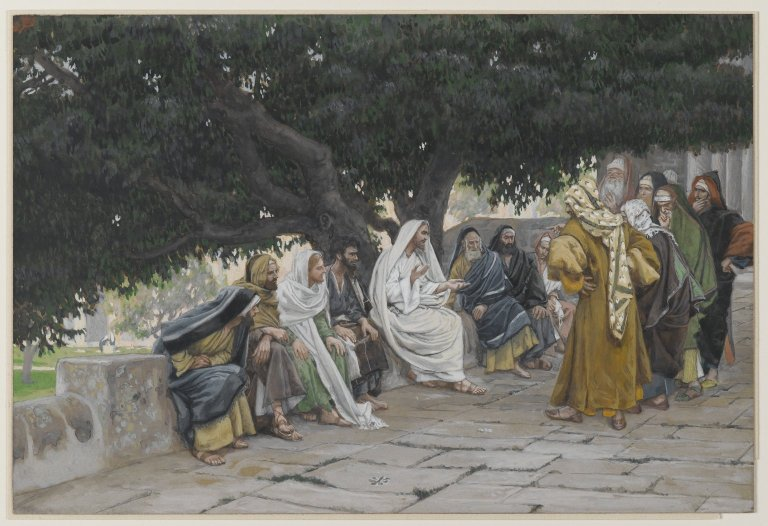
- "The Pharisees and the Sadducees Come to Tempt Jesus" by James Tissot (between 1886 and 1894).
- Book: Gospel of Matthew
- Christian Bible part: New Testament

Matthew 15:8 is the eighth verse in the fifteenth chapter of the Gospel of Matthew in the New Testament.

== Content ==
In the original Greek according to Westcott-Hort for this verse is:

Ἐγγίζει μοι ὁ λαὸς οὗτος τῷ στόματι αὐτῶν, καὶ τοῖς χείλεσί με τιμᾷ, ἡ δὲ καρδία αὐτῶν πόρρω ἀπέχει ἀπ᾿ ἐμοῦ.

In the King James Version of the Bible the text reads:

This people draweth nigh unto me with their mouth, and honoureth me with their lips; but their heart is far from me.

The New International Version translates the passage as:

"'These people honor me with their lips, but their hearts are far from me.

== Analysis ==
This quotation is from Isaiah 29:13, according to the Septuagint: "This people approaches Me, with their mouth, and honours Me with their lips; but their heart is far from Me." The phrase "approaches me" is understood as reverences me. This sense is captured by the KJV. The NIV uses a freer translation.

== Commentary from the Church Fathers ==
Saint Remigius: "For the Jewish nation seemed to draw near to God with their lips and mouth, inasmuch as they boasted that they held the worship of the One God; but in their hearts they departed from Him, because after they had seen His signs and miracles, they would neither acknowledge His divinity, nor receive Him."

Rabanus Maurus: "Also, they honoured Him with their lips when they said, Master, we know that thou art true, (Mat. 22:16.) but their heart was far from Him when they sent spies to entangle Him in His talk."

Preceded by Matthew 15:7	Gospel of Matthew; Chapter 15	Succeeded by Matthew 15:9
