= Matthew 15:7 =

- ← 15:6 15:8 →
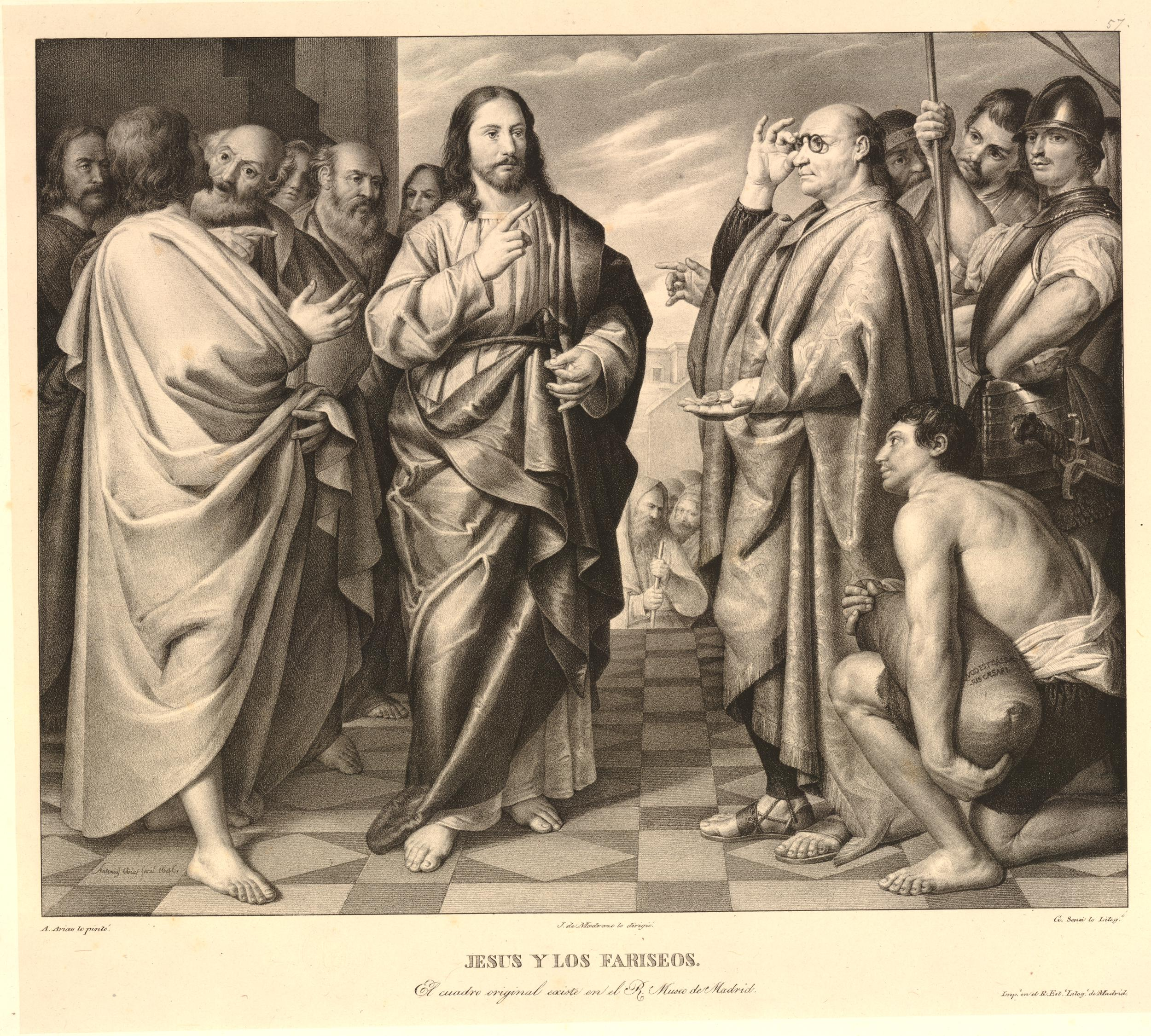
- "Jesus and the Pharisees" by Gaspar Sensi, after: Antonio Fernández Arias (c. 1826-1832).
- Book: Gospel of Matthew
- Christian Bible part: New Testament

Matthew 15:7 is the seventh verse in the fifteenth chapter of the Gospel of Matthew in the New Testament.

== Content ==
In the original Greek according to Westcott-Hort for this verse is:

ὑποκριταί, καλῶς προεφήτευσε περὶ ὑμῶν Ἠσαΐας, λέγων,

In the King James Version of the Bible the text reads:

Ye hypocrites, well did Esaias prophesy of you, saying,

The New International Version translates the passage as:

You hypocrites! Isaiah was right when he prophesied about you:

== Analysis ==
The word, hypocrites (Greek: ὑποκριταί), denotes an actor in a drama. Here, it is applied to the Scribes and Pharisees, who appeared pious, but did not really possess it. For they were most scrupulous in the observance of the law, but violated it in its important precepts. The words of Isaiah although addressed primarily to the Jews of the Prophet's time, Jesus takes as applying to the Jewish people in general both then and in His own time.

== Commentary from the Church Fathers ==
Chrysostom: "The Lord had shown that the Pharisees were not worthy to accuse those who transgressed the commands of the elders, seeing they overthrew the law of God themselves; and He again proves this by the testimony of the Prophet; Hypocrites, well did Esaias prophesy of you, saying, This people honoureth me with their lips, but their heart is far from me."

Saint Remigius: "Hypocrite signifies dissembler, one who feigns one thing in his outward act, and bears another thing in his heart. These then are well-called hypocrites, because under cover of God’s honour they sought to heap up for themselves earthly gain."

Rabanus Maurus: "Esaias saw before the hypocrisy of the Jews, that they would craftily oppose the Gospel, and therefore he said in the person of the Lord, This people honoureth me with their lips, &c."

| Preceded by Matthew 15:6 | Gospel of Matthew; Chapter 15 | Succeeded by Matthew 15:8 |
