= Matthew 15:21 =

- ← 15:20 15:22 →
- Book: Gospel of Matthew
- Christian Bible part: New Testament

Matthew 15:21 is a verse in the fifteenth chapter of the Gospel of Matthew in the New Testament.

== Content ==
In the original Greek according to Westcott-Hort, the verse is:

Καὶ ἐξελθὼν ἐκεῖθεν ὁ Ἰησοῦς ἀνεχώρησεν εἰς τὰ μέρη Τύρου καὶ Σιδῶνος.

In the King James Version of the Bible the text reads:

Then Jesus went thence, and departed into the coasts of Tyre and Sidon.

The New International Version translates the passage as:

Leaving that place, Jesus withdrew to the region of Tyre and Sidon.

== Analysis ==
Perhaps because of rough reception Jesus received from many of the Jews, in this verse, he retires to the confines of Tyre and Sidon, with the view of showing to his Apostles, by this mode of acting, how they were, after his resurrection, to transfer the preaching of the Gospel to the Gentiles, from the Jews. He may have also wanted to retreat and rest after his labors, for in Mark 7:27, which parallels Matthew 15:21, it is stated that upon entering a house, Jesus wished to remain concealed and unknown.

Tyre and Sidon were maritime cities of Phoenicia, to the north of Galilee, near Mount Lebanon, which bordered on Judea. Some commentators state that Jesus did not enter the territories of the Gentiles, but, that he only came to the extreme confines of Galilee, on the borders of Phoenicia, of which Tyre and Sidon were the principal cities. In favour of this opinion, is the fact that the "woman came out" of these parts to see Jesus. However, this might be explained that while he was in these parts, she came out of her house to hear him (Mark 7:25).

Henirich Meyer notes that this is a third point of "withdrawal", following on from Matthew 12:15 and Matthew 14:13; the same word, ἀνεχώρησεν (anechōrēsen) is used in each case.

== Commentary from the Church Fathers ==
Jerome: "Leaving the Scribes and Pharisees and those cavillers, He passes into the parts of Tyre and Sidon; that He may heal the Tyrians and Sidonians; And Jesus went thence, and departed into the coasts of Tyre and Sidon."

Chrysostom: " It should be observed, that when He delivered the Jews from the observance of meats, He then also opened the door to the Gentiles, as Peter was first bidden in the vision to break this law, and was afterwards sent to Cornelius. But if any should ask, how it is that He bade His disciples go not into the way of the Gentiles, and yet now Himself walks this way; we will answer, first, that that precept which He had given His disciples was not obligatory on Him; secondly, that He went not to preach, whence Mark even says, that He purposely concealed Himself."

Saint Remigius: "Tyre and Sidon were Gentile towns, for Tyre was the metropolis of the Chananæans, and Sidon the boundary of the Chananæans, towards the north." "He went that He might heal them of Tyre and Sidon; or that He might deliver this woman’s daughter from the dæmon, and so through her faith might condemn the wickedness of the Scribes and Pharisees. Of this woman it proceeds; And, behold, a woman, a Chananite, came out from those parts."

Preceded by Matthew 15:20	Gospel of Matthew; Chapter 15	Succeeded by Matthew 15:22
