= Matthew 15:19 =

- ← 15:18 15:20 →
- Book: Gospel of Matthew
- Christian Bible part: New Testament

Matthew 15:19 is a verse in the fifteenth chapter of the Gospel of Matthew in the New Testament.

== Content ==
In the original Greek according to Westcott-Hort for this verse is:

Ἐκ γὰρ τῆς καρδίας ἐξέρχονται διαλογισμοὶ πονηροί, φόνοι, μοιχεῖαι, πορνεῖαι, κλοπαί, ψευδομαρτυρίαι, βλασφημίαι·

In the King James Version of the Bible the text reads:

For out of the heart proceed evil thoughts, murders, adulteries, fornications, thefts, false witness, blasphemies:

The New International Version translates the passage as:

For out of the heart come evil thoughts, murder, adultery, sexual immorality, theft, false testimony, slander.

== Analysis ==
Here Jesus clarifies His words, "proceed out of the mouth" (verse 18). "For, from the heart come forth evil thoughts." Thus even though "thoughts" may not proceed to words or acts, still, they proceed from the heart and mind, and may be sinful, and may pollute one's soul. "He who looks after a woman, to lust after her, commits adultery" (Matthew 5:28) This refuted the commonplace understanding of some of the Jews at that time who imagined that mere thoughts, as such, although consented to, were not sinful. Deeds of sin are first conceived voluntarily in the heart, before they are externally manifested in act.

== Commentary from the Church Fathers ==
Glossa Ordinaria: " And from evil thoughts proceed evil deeds and evil words, which are forbidden by the law; whence He adds Murders, which are forbidden by that commandment of the Law, Thou shalt not kill; Adulteries, fornications, which are understood to be forbidden by that precept, Thou shalt not commit adultery; Thefts, forbidden by the command, Thou shalt not steal; False witness, by that, Thou shall not bear false witness against thy neighbour; Blasphemies, by that, Thou shalt not take the name of God in vain."

Saint Remigius: "Having named the vices which are forbidden by the divine Law, the Lord beautifully adds, These are they that defile a man, that is, make him unclean and impure."

Preceded by Matthew 15:18	Gospel of Matthew; Chapter 15	Succeeded by Matthew 15:20
