= Matthew 15:14 =

- ← 15:13 15:15 →
- Book: Gospel of Matthew
- Christian Bible part: New Testament

Matthew 15:14 is a verse in the fifteenth chapter of the Gospel of Matthew in the New Testament.

== Content ==
In the original Greek according to Westcott-Hort for this verse is:

Ἄφετε αὐτούς· ὁδηγοί εἰσι τυφλοὶ τυφλῶν· τυφλὸς δὲ τυφλὸν ἐὰν ὁδηγῇ, ἀμφότεροι εἰς βόθυνον πεσοῦνται.

In the King James Version of the Bible the text reads:

Let them alone: they be blind leaders of the blind. And if the blind lead the blind, both shall fall into the ditch.

The New International Version translates the passage as:

Leave them; they are blind guides. If a blind man leads a blind man, both will fall into a pit."

== Analysis ==
By, "let them alone," according to Lapide Christ means: let the Scribes be scandalised. Do not be bothered that they are offended with my doctrine and correction. Being blind, they do not see the light of truth, which I set before them. Rather in their error, they make sanctity consist in washing and other external things. They are incorrigible, and are leaders of the blind, namely, of those to whom they teach.

The "pit" here appears to imply that their ruin will be eternal.

== Commentary from the Church Fathers ==
Glossa Ordinaria: " Or, the plant here spoken of may be the doctors of the Law with their followers, who had not Christ for their foundation. Why they are to be rooted up, He adds, Let them alone; they are blind, leaders of the blind."

Rabanus Maurus: "They are blind, that is, they want the light of God’s commandments; and they are leaders of the blind, inasmuch as they draw others headlong, erring, and leading into error; whence it is added, If the blind lead the blind, they both fall into the ditch."

Jerome: "This is also the same as that Apostolic injunction, A heretic after the first and second admonition reject, knowing that such a one is perverse. (Tit. 3:10, 11.) To the same end the Saviour commands evil teachers to be left to their own will, knowing that it is hardly that they can be brought to the truth."

Preceded by Matthew 15:13	Gospel of Matthew; Chapter 15	Succeeded by Matthew 15:15
