= Matthew 15:12 =

- ← 15:11 15:13 →
- Book: Gospel of Matthew
- Christian Bible part: New Testament

Matthew 15:12 is a verse in the fifteenth chapter of the Gospel of Matthew in the New Testament.

== Content ==
In the original Greek according to Westcott-Hort for this verse is:

Τότε προσελθόντες οἱ μαθηταὶ αὐτοῦ εἶπον αὐτῷ, Οἶδας ὅτι οἱ Φαρισαῖοι ἀκούσαντες τὸν λόγον ἐσκανδαλίσθησαν;

In the King James Version of the Bible the text reads:

Then came his disciples, and said unto him, Knowest thou that the Pharisees were offended, after they heard this saying?

The New International Version translates the passage as:

Then the disciples came to him and asked, "Do you know that the Pharisees were offended when they heard this?"

== Analysis ==
Jesus' disciples, perhaps seeing the countenance of the Pharisees, and hearing the words privately murmured, knew that His doctrine gave them offense. Also the disciples may not have understood, and were looking for a further explanation seeing that Jesus' doctrine appeared to be opposed to the law of Moses. The disciples knew that the Pharisees, by their influence, could prove formidable enemies, so would have thought it prudent to conciliate them. The Pharisees had taken offense, because the doctrine of Christ was subversive of their traditional customs, regarding frequent washings.

== Commentary from the Church Fathers ==
Jerome: "In one of the Lord’s discourses the whole superstition of Jewish observances had been cut down. They placed their whole religion in using or abstaining from certain meats."

Chrysostom: "When the Pharisees heard the things that went before, they made no reply to them, because He had so mightily overthrown them, not only refuting their arguments, but detecting their fraud, but they, not the multitudes, were offended at them; Then came his disciples unto him and said, Knowest thou that the Pharisees were offended after they heard this saying?"

Jerome: "As this word ‘scandalum’ (offence or stumblingblock) is of such frequent use in ecclesiastical writings, we will shortly explain it. We might render it in Latin, ‘offendiculum,’ or ‘ruina,’ or ‘impactio;’ and so when we read, Whosoever shall scandalize, we understand, Whoso by word or deed has given an occasion of falling to any."

Preceded by Matthew 15:11	Gospel of Matthew; Chapter 15	Succeeded by Matthew 15:13
