= Matthew 15:15-18 =

- ← 15:14 15:19 →
- Book: Gospel of Matthew
- Christian Bible part: New Testament

Matthew 15:15-18 is a set of verses in the fifteenth chapter of the Gospel of Matthew in the New Testament.

== Content ==
In the original Greek according to Westcott-Hort for this verse is:

15:Ἀποκριθεὶς δὲ ὁ Πέτρος εἶπεν αὐτῷ, Φράσον ἡμῖν τὴν παραβολὴν ταύτην.
16:Ὁ δὲ Ἰησοῦς εἶπεν, Ἀκμὴν καὶ ὑμεῖς ἀσύνετοί ἐστε;
17:Οὔπω νοεῖτε ὅτι πᾶν τὸ εἰσπορευόμενον εἰς τὸ στόμα εἰς τὴν κοιλίαν χωρεῖ, καὶ εἰς ἀφεδρῶνα ἐκβάλλεται;
18:Τὰ δὲ ἐκπορευόμενα ἐκ τοῦ στόματος ἐκ τῆς καρδίας ἐξέρχεται, κἀκεῖνα κοινοῖ τὸν ἄνθρωπον.

In the King James Version of the Bible the text reads:

15:Then answered Peter and said unto him, Declare unto us this parable.
16:And Jesus said, Are ye also yet without understanding?
17:Do not ye yet understand, that whatsoever entereth in at the mouth goeth into the belly, and is cast out into the draught?
18:But those things which proceed out of the mouth come forth from the heart; and they defile the man.

The New International Version translates the passage as:

15:Peter said, "Explain the parable to us."
16:"Are you still so dull?" Jesus asked them.
17:"Don't you see that whatever enters the mouth goes into the stomach and then out of the body?
18:But the things that come out of the mouth come from the heart, and these make a man 'unclean.'

== Analysis ==
We again see the ardent faith of Peter looking for an answer, who is clearly acting as the spokesman for the disciples, from the words "to us." From Mark 7:17 as well, it is clear that the disciples were perplexed about Jesus teaching concerning food and how it could be reconciled with the law of Moses concerning food, because they call it a parable. In verse 16, according to MacEvilly Jesus seems to be saying, "You, who have so long walked in the light of My doctrine, and have been familiar and intimate friends, to whom had been already frequently explained, in what real purity of soul consists." In explaining the parable Jesus makes clear that food merely enters the stomach and not the heart. Rather the evil expressed by the mouth is what defiles and makes one unclean.

== Commentary from the Church Fathers ==
Saint Remigius: "The Lord was used to speak in parables, so that Peter when he heard, That which entereth into the mouth defileth not a man, thought it was spoken as a parable, and asked, as it follows; Then answered Peter, and said unto him, Declare unto us this parable. And because he asked this on behalf of the rest, they are all included in the rebuke, But he said, Are ye also yet without understanding?"

Jerome: "He is reproved by the Lord, because He supposed that to be spoken parabolically, which was indeed spoken plainly. Which teaches us that that hearer is to be blamed who would take dark sayings as clear, or clear sayings as obscure."

Chrysostom: "Or, The Lord blames him, because it was not from any uncertainty that he asked this, but from offence which he had taken. The multitudes had not understood what had been said; but the disciples were offended at it, whence at the first they had desired to ask Him concerning the Pharisees, but had been stayed by that mighty declaration, Every plant, &c. But Peter, who is ever zealous, is not silent even so; therefore the Lord reproves him, adding a reason for His reproof, Do ye not understand, that whatsoever entereth in at the mouth goeth into the belly, and is cast out into the draught?"

Jerome: "Some cavil at this, that the Lord is ignorant of physical disputation in saying that all food goes into the belly, and is cast out into the draught; for that the food, as soon as it is taken, is distributed through the limbs, the veins, the marrow, and the nerves. But it should be known, that the lighter juices, and liquid food after it has been reduced and digested in the veins and vessels, passes into the lower parts through those passages which the Greeks call ‘pores,’ and so goes into the draught."

Augustine: " The nourishment of the body being first changed into corruption, that is, having lost its proper form, is absorbed into the substance of the limbs, and repairs their waste, passing through a medium into another form, and by the spontaneous motion of the parts is so separated, that such portions as are adapted for the purpose are taken up into the structure of this fair visible, while such as are unfit are rejected through their own passages. One part consisting of fæces is restored to earth to reappear again in new forms; another part goes off in perspiration, and another is taken up by the nervous system for the purposes of reproduction of the species."

Chrysostom: "But the Lord in thus speaking answers His disciples after Jewish infirmity; He says that the food does not abide, but goes out; but if it did abide, yet would it not make a man unclean. But they could not yet hear these things. Thus Moses also pronounces that they continued unclean, so long as the food continued in them; for he bids them wash in the evening, and then they should be clean, calculating the time of digestion and egestion."

Augustine: " And the Lord includes herein man’s two mouths, one of the body, one of the heart. For when He says, Not all that goeth into the mouth defileth a man, He clearly speaks of the body’s mouth; but in that which follows, He alludes to the mouth of the heart, But those things which proceed out of the mouth, come forth from the heart, and they defile a man."

Chrysostom: "For the things which are of the heart, remain within a man, and defile him in going out of him, as well as in abiding in him; yea, more in going out of him; wherefore He adds, Out of the heart proceed evil thoughts; He gives these the first place, because this was the very fault of the Jews, who laid snares for Him."

Jerome: "The principle therefore of the soul is not according to Plato in the brain, but according to Christ in the heart, and by this passage we may refute those who think that evil thoughts are suggestions of the Devil, and do not spring from our proper will. The Devil may encourage and abet evil thoughts, but not originate them. And if he be able, being always on the watch, to blow into flame any small spark of thought in us, we should not thence conclude that he searches the hidden places of the heart, but that from our manner and motions he judges of what is passing within us. For instance, if he see us direct frequent looks towards a fair woman, he understands that our heart is wounded through the eye."

Preceded by Matthew 15:14	Gospel of Matthew; Chapter 15	Succeeded by Matthew 15:19
