= Matthew 15:28 =

- ← 15:27 15:29-31 →
- Book: Gospel of Matthew
- Christian Bible part: New Testament

Matthew 15:28 is a verse in the fifteenth chapter of the Gospel of Matthew in the New Testament.

== Content ==
In the original Greek according to Westcott-Hort, this verse is:

Τότε ἀποκριθεὶς ὁ Ἰησοῦς εἶπεν αὐτῇ, Ὦ γύναι, μεγάλη σου ἡ πίστις· γενηθήτω σοι ὡς θέλεις. Καὶ ἰάθη ἡ θυγάτηρ αὐτῆς ἀπὸ τῆς ὥρας ἐκείνης.

In the King James Version of the Bible the text reads:

Then Jesus answered and said unto her, O woman, great is thy faith: be it unto thee even as thou wilt. And her daughter was made whole from that very hour.

The New International Version translates the passage as:

Then Jesus answered, "Woman, you have great faith! Your request is granted." And her daughter was healed from that very hour.

== Analysis ==
Justus Knecht gives a moral lesson in prayer based on the woman, writing:

Perseverance in Prayer. This woman did not give way to discouragement, although for a time Jesus would not hearken to her. His sole response to the intercession of His apostles was to say that He was sent only to the Israelites, and His reply to herself sounded very like an absolute refusal. This shows us that we ought never to weary of prayer, even though it seems as if God would not hearken to us.

Cornelius a Lapide writes, "Christ would not restrain any longer His admiration, but cried out as it were with wonder, O woman great is thy faith."

Preceded by Matthew 15:27	Gospel of Matthew; Chapter 15	Succeeded by Matthew 15:29-31
