= Matthew 15:3-6 =

- ← 15:2 15:7 →
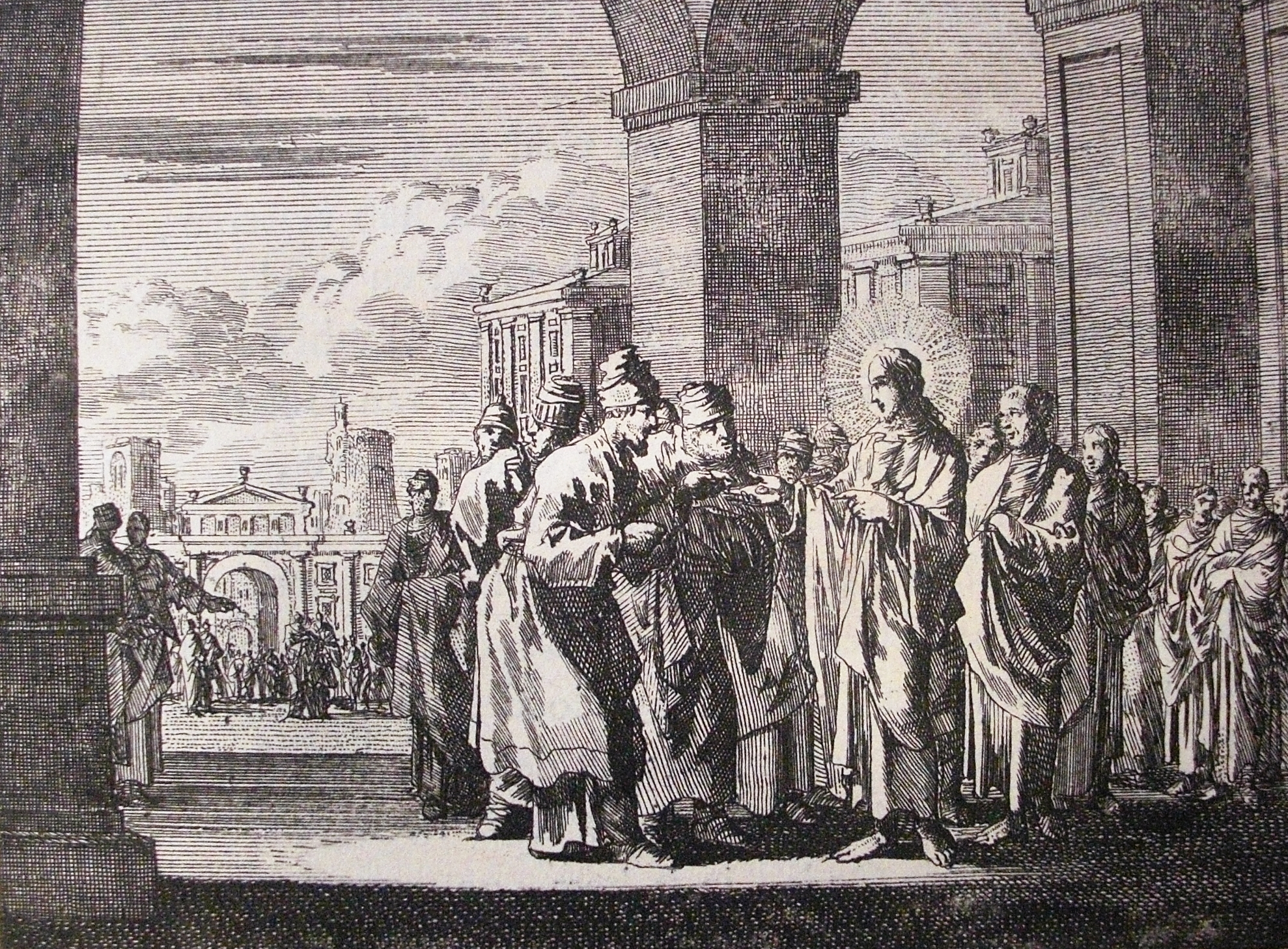
- "Dispute of Jesus and the Pharisees", an etching by Jan Luyken from the Phillip Medhurst Collection of Bible illustrations housed at Belgrave Hall, Leicester, England.
- Book: Gospel of Matthew
- Christian Bible part: New Testament

Matthew 15:3-6 is a set of verses in the fifteenth chapter of the Gospel of Matthew in the New Testament.

== Content ==
In the original Greek according to Westcott-Hort for this verse is:

3:Ὁ δὲ ἀποκριθεὶς εἶπεν αὐτοῖς, Διὰ τί καὶ ὑμεῖς παραβαίνετε τὴν ἐντολὴν τοῦ Θεοῦ διὰ τὴν παράδοσιν ὑμῶν;
4:Ὁ γὰρ Θεὸς ἐνετείλατο, λέγων, Τίμα τὸν πατέρα σοῦ καὶ τὴν μητέρα· καί, Ὁ κακολογῶν πατέρα ἢ μητέρα θανάτῳ τελευτάτω·
5:ὑμεῖς δὲ λέγετε, Ὃς ἂν εἴπῃ τῷ πατρὶ ἢ τῇ μητρί, Δῶρον, ὃ ἐὰν ἐξ ἐμοῦ ὠφεληθῇς, καὶ οὐ μὴ τιμήσῃ τὸν πατέρα αὐτοῦ ἢ τὴν μητέρα αὐτοῦ·
6:καὶ ἠκυρώσατε τὴν ἐντολὴν τοῦ Θεοῦ διὰ τὴν παράδοσιν ὑμῶν·

In the King James Version of the Bible the text reads:

3:But he answered and said unto them, Why do ye also transgress the commandment of God by your tradition?
4:For God commanded, saying, Honour thy father and mother: and, He that curseth father or mother, let him die the death.
5:But ye say, Whosoever shall say to his father or his mother, It is a gift, by whatsoever thou mightest be profited by me;
6:And honour not his father or his mother, he shall be free. Thus have ye made the commandment of God of none effect by your tradition.

The New International Version translates the passage as:

3:Jesus replied, "And why do you break the command of God for the sake of your tradition?
4:For God said, 'Honor your father and mother' and 'Anyone who curses his father or mother must be put to death.'
5:But you say that if a man says to his father or mother, 'Whatever help you might otherwise have received from me is a gift devoted to God,'
6:he is not to 'honor his father 'with it. Thus you nullify the word of God for the sake of your tradition.

== Analysis ==
In verse 3 the emphasis seems to be the word "your." These traditions were not instituted by God, or by the ancient Patriarchs and Prophets, rather they were only invented in Jesus' time by the Scribes and Pharisees. Honour in this place, as often in Scripture, seems to signify not only reverence, but help, almsgiving, sustentation. This is plain from what follows. Gift in Heb. is קרבן corban, (see Mark 7:11). The word is often used in Leviticus, where lambs, goats, and calves, offered to God are called corban, i.e., an oblation. Hence the Treasury, into which offerings were cast by the people was called corban (Matt 27:6.)

== Commentary from the Church Fathers ==
Chrysostom: "Christ made no excuse for them, but immediately brought a counter charge, showing that he that sins in great things ought not to take offence at the slight sins of others. He answered and said unto them, Why do ye also transgress the commandment of God because of your tradition? He says not that they do well to transgress that He may not give room for calumny; nor on the other hand does He condemn what the Apostles had done, that He may not sanction their traditions; nor again does He bring any charge directly against them of old, that they might not put Him from them as a calumniator; but He points His reproof against those who had come to Him; thus at the same time touching the elders who had laid down such a tradition; saying,"

Jerome: "Since ye because of the tradition of men neglect the commandment of God, why do ye take upon you to reprove my disciples, for bestowing little regard upon the precepts of the elders, that they may observe the commands of God? For God hath said, Honour thy father and thy mother. Honour in the Scriptures is shown not so much in salutations and courtesies as in alms and gifts. Honour, (1 Tim. 5:3.) says the Apostle, the widows who are widows indeed; here ‘honour’ signifies a gift. The Lord then having thought for the infirmity, the age, or the poverty of parents, commanded that sons should honour their parents in providing them with necessaries of life."

Chrysostom: "He desired to show the great honour that ought to be paid to parents, and therefore attached both a reward and a penalty. But in this occasion the Lord passes over the reward promised to such as did honour their parents, namely, that they should live long upon the earth, and brings forward the terrible part only, namely, the punishment, that He might strike these dumb and attract others; And he that curseth father and mother, let him die the death; thus He shows that they deserved even death. For if ho who dishonours his parent even in word is worthy of death, much more ye who dishonour him in deed; and ye not only dishonour your parents, but teach others to do so likewise. Ye then who do not deserve even to live, how accuse ye my disciples? But how they transgress the commandment of God is clear when He adds, But ye say, Whoso shall say to his father or his mother, If in a gift, whatsoever thou mightest be profited by me."

Jerome: "For the Scribes and Pharisees desiring to overturn this foregoing most provident law of God, that they might bring in their impiety under the mask of piety, taught bad sons, that should any desire to devote to God, who is the true parent, those things which ought to be offered to parents, the offering to the Lord should he preferred to the offering them to parents."

Glossa Ordinaria: " In this interpretation the sense will be, What I offer to God will profit both you and myself; and therefore you ought not to take of my goods for your own needs, but to suffer that I offer them to God."

Jerome: "And thus the parents refusing what they saw thus dedicated to God, that they might not incur the guilt of sacrilege, perished of want, and so it came to pass that what the children offered for the needs of the temple and the service of God, went to the gain of the Priests."

Glossa Ordinaria: " Or the sense may be, Whosoever, that is, of you young men, shall say, that is, shall either be able to say, or shall say, to his father or mother, O father, the gift that is of me devoted to God, shall it profit thee? as it were an exclamation of surprise; you ought not to take it that you may not incur the guilt of sacrilege. Or, we may read it with this ellipsis, Whosoever shall say to his father, &c. he shall do the commandment of God, or shall fulfil the Law, or shall be worthy of life eternal."

Jerome: "Or it may briefly have the following sense; Ye compel children to say to their parents, What gift soever I was purposing to offer to God, you take and consume upon your living, and so it profits you; as much as to say, Do not so."

Glossa Ordinaria: " And thus through these arguments of your avarice, this youth shall Honour not his father or his mother. As if He had said; Ye have led sons into most evil deeds; so that it will come to pass that afterwards they shall not even honour their father and mother. And thus ye have made the commandment of God concerning the support of parents by their children vain through your traditions, obeying the dictates of avarice."

Augustine: " Christ here clearly shows both that that law which the heretic blasphemes is God’s law, and that the Jews had their traditions foreign to the prophetical and canonical books; such as the Apostle calls profane and vain fables."

Augustine: " The Lord here teaches us many things; That it was not He that turned the Jews from their God; that not only did He not infringe the commandments, but convicts them of infringing them; and that He had ordained no more than those by the hand of Moses."

Augustine: " Otherwise; The gift whatsoever thou offerest on my account, shall profit thee; that is to say, Whatsoever gift thou offerest on my account, shall henceforth remain with thee; the son signifying by these words that there is no longer need that parents should offer for him, as he is of age to offer for himself. And those who were of age to be able to say thus to their parents, the Pharisees denied that they were guilty, if they did not show honour to their parents."

| Preceded by Matthew 15:2 | Gospel of Matthew; Chapter 15 | Succeeded by Matthew 15:7 |
