= Matthew 15:2 =

- ← 15:1 15:3 →
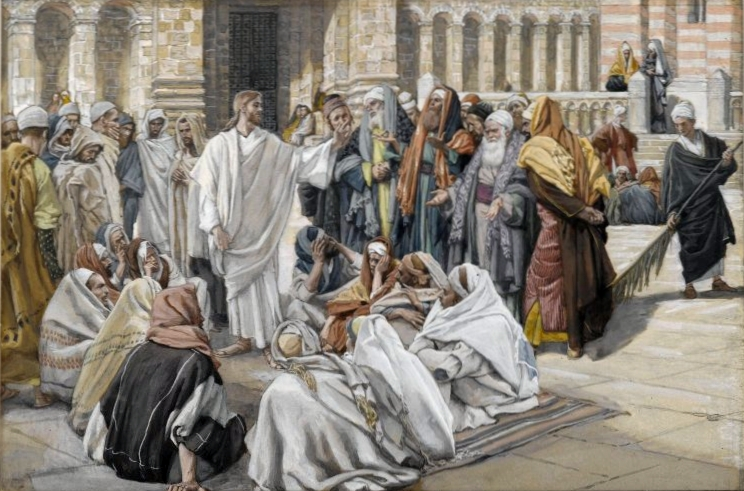
- " The Pharisees Question Jesus" by James Tissot (between 1886 and 1894).
- Book: Gospel of Matthew
- Christian Bible part: New Testament

Matthew 15:2 is a verse in the fifteenth chapter of the Gospel of Matthew in the New Testament.

== Content ==
In the original Greek according to Westcott-Hort for this verse is:

Διὰ τί οἱ μαθηταί σου παραβαίνουσι τὴν παράδοσιν τῶν πρεσβυτέρων; Οὐ γὰρ νίπτονται τὰς χεῖρας αὐτῶν, ὅταν ἄρτον ἐσθίωσιν.

In the King James Version of the Bible the text reads:

Why do thy disciples transgress the tradition of the elders? for they wash not their hands when they eat bread.

The New International Version translates the passage as:

"Why do your disciples break the tradition of the elders? They don't wash their hands before they eat!"

== Analysis ==
The Pharisees were known for their pious practices. However sometimes it seems their whole sanctity consisted in outward practices such as frequent washings before their meals, even when they were taking their food. It was for this reason, according to John 2:6, that at the wedding at Cana, six water-pots were present for these purificatory purposes. They would frequently wash their cups and basins and even their beds and tables (see Mark 7:4). They were thus careful, for fear the vessels, being polluted, should contaminate those who ate out of them. However this was done out of custom, since the law prescribed nothing of the sort.

The word "their" (Greek: αυτων, autōn) in "their hands" is excluded by Westcott and Hort in their critical edition.

== Commentary from the Church Fathers ==
Saint Remigius: "They were faulty for two reasons; because they had come from Jerusalem, from the holy city, and because they were elders of the people, and doctors of the Law, and had not come to learn but to reprove the Lord, for it is added, Saying, Why do thy disciples transgress the tradition of the elders?"

Jerome: "Wonderful infatuation of the Pharisees and Scribes! They accuse the Son of God that He does not keep the traditions and commandments of men."

Chrysostom: "Observe, how they are taken in their own question. They say not, ‘Why do they transgress the Law of Moses?’ but, the tradition of the elders; whence it is manifest that the Priests had introduced many new things, although Moses had said, Ye shall not add ought to the word which I set before you this day, neither shall ye take ought away from it; (Deut. 4:2.) and when they ought to have been set free from observances, then they bound themselves by many more; fearing lest any should take away their rule and power, they sought to increase the awe in which they were held, by setting themselves forth as legislators."

Saint Remigius: "Of what kind these traditions were, Mark shows when he says, The Pharisees and all the Jews, except they wash their hands oft, eat not. (Mark 7:3.) Here then also they find fault with the disciples, saying, For they wash not their hands when they eat bread."

Bede: " Taking carnally those words of the Prophets, in which it is said, Wash, and he ye clean, they, observed it only in washing the body; (Is. 1:16.) hence they had laid it down that we ought not to eat with unwashen hands."

Jerome: "But the hands that are to be washed are the acts not of the body, but of the mind; that the word of God may be done in them."

Chrysostom: "But the disciples now did not eat with washen hands, because they already despised all things superfluous, and attended only to such as were necessary; thus they accepted neither washing nor not washing as a rule, but did either as it happened. For how should they who even neglected the food that was necessary for them, have any care about this rite?"

Saint Remigius: "Or the Pharisees found fault with the Lord’s disciples, not concerning that washing which we do from ordinary habit, and of necessity, but of that superfluous washing which was invented by the tradition of the elders."

Preceded by Matthew 15:1	Gospel of Matthew; Chapter 15	Succeeded by Matthew 15:3
