= Four Prophets =

First UK edition

Four Prophets: Amos, Hosea, First Isaiah and Micah: A Modern Translation from the Hebrew by J. B. Phillips is a modern translation from Hebrew sources of the books of Amos, Hosea, First Isaiah and Micah by scholar J. B. Phillips. The book was published in 1963 Macmillan in the US and Geoffrey Bles in the UK. Phillips also published The New Testament in Modern English. The remainder of the Old Testament was never completed by him.

== Textual example ==
Excerpt from First Isaiah 21:1-2, translated in a "thought-for-thought" pattern:

A Warning from the desert:
A dreadful vision has come to me,
Roaring out of the desert
From the terrible land,
Sweeping on like the whirlwinds in the south.
The plunderer continues his plundering,
The destroyer continues his destruction.
Up then, men of Elam, Besiege them, men of Media!
Put an end to their boastings.

The same text from the American Standard Version translation, a "word-for-word" translation:

The burden of the wilderness of the sea. As whirlwinds in the South sweep through, it cometh from the wilderness, from a terrible land. A grievous vision is declared unto me; the treacherous man dealeth treacherously, and the destroyer destroyeth. Go up, O Elam; besiege, O Media; all the sighing thereof have I made to cease.

== See also ==
- Bible version debate
- Bible translations
- English translations of the Bible
- Modern English Bible translations
