= John Bertram Phillips =

English priest and Bible translator

- Born: 16 September 1906
- Died: 21 July 1982
- Education: Emanuel School, Emmanuel College
- Occupations: Theologian, parson

John Bertram Phillips or J. B. Phillips (16 September 1906 – 21 July 1982) was an English Bible translator, author and Anglican clergyman. He is most noted for his The New Testament in Modern English.

== Early life ==
Phillips was born in Barnes, which was then in Surrey but is now in the London Borough of Richmond upon Thames. He was educated at Emanuel School in London and graduated with an Honours Degree in Classics and English from Emmanuel College, Cambridge. After training for ordination at Ridley Hall, Cambridge, he was ordained a clergyman in the Church of England in 1930 (both deacon and priest in the same year).

== Career ==
During World War II, while vicar of the Church of the Good Shepherd in Lee, London (1940-44), he found the young people in his church did not understand the Authorised Version of the Bible. He used the time in the bomb shelters during the London Blitz to begin a translation of the New Testament into modern English, starting with the Epistle to the Colossians. The results appealed to the young people who found it easier to understand. Encouraged by their feedback, after the war Phillips continued to translate the rest of the New Testament into colloquial English.

=== New testament translation ===
Portions of the New Testament were published after the war, starting with Letters to Young Churches in 1947, which received C. S. Lewis' backing. In 1952 he added the Gospels. In 1955 he added the Acts of the Apostles and entitled it The Young Church in Action. In 1957 he added the Book of Revelation. The final compilation was published in 1958 as The New Testament in Modern English for which he is now best known. This was revised and republished in 1961 and then again in 1972. Time Magazine wrote of Phillips, "...he can make St. Paul sound as contemporary as the preacher down the street. Seeking to transmit freshness and life across the centuries". In his Preface to the Schools Edition of his 1959 version of the New Testament, Phillips states that he "wrote for the young people who belonged to my youth club, most of them not much above school-leaving age, and I undertook the work simply because I found that the Authorised Version was not intelligible to them".

He talked of the revelation he received as he translated the New Testament, describing it as "extraordinarily alive", unlike any experience he had with non-scriptural ancient texts. He referred to the scriptures speaking to his life in an "uncanny way", similarly to the way the author of Psalm 119 talks.

Phillips often grouped verses of the New Testament together into longer paragraphs cutting across the individual verses of traditional translations: see for example John 8:27–30:

They did not realise that he was talking to them about the Father. So Jesus resumed, “When you have lifted up the Son of Man, then you will realise that I am who I say I am, and that I do nothing on my own authority but speak simply as my Father has taught me. The one who sent me is with me now: the Father has never left me alone for I always do what pleases him.” And even while he said these words, many people believed in him.

=== Old testament translation ===
Phillips also translated parts of the Old Testament. In 1963 he published translations of Isaiah 1-39, Hosea, Amos, and Micah. This was titled Four Prophets: Amos, Hosea, First Isaiah, Micah: A Modern Translation from the Hebrew; he did not translate the Old Testament any further.

== Death ==
Phillips died in Swanage in Dorset, England in 1982.

== Bibliography ==
- Quiet Times. A Book for Private Prayer 1938
- Reality in Religion 1938
- A Translation of the New Testament Epistles 1947
- Making Men Whole 1952 (revised 1955)
- The Gospels in Modern English 1952
- Your God is Too Small 1953
- Plain Christianity: and Other Broadcast Talks 1954
- Appointment with God: Some Thoughts on Holy Communion 1954
- The Young Church in Action 1955
- When God was Man 1955
- The Church Under the Cross 1956
- New Testament Christianity 1956
- Letters to Young Churches 1957
- The Inside Story: In Modern English as told in Luke, John, Acts and Romans 1957
- St. Luke's Life of Christ 1957
- God With Us. A Message for Christmas. 1957
- Is God at Home? 1957
- The Book of Revelation 1957
- The New Testament in Modern English 1958
- Backwards to Christmas [First published in "The life of faith".] 1958
- God our Contemporary 1960
- New Testament Readings for Schools 1960
- The Christian Year: The Prayer Book Collects 1961
- Four Prophets Amos, Hosea, First Isaiah, Micah; a modern translation from the Hebrew, 1963
- Good News: Thoughts on God and Man. 1963
- The Ring of Truth: A translator's testimony 1967
- Jesus Christ and Him Crucified; A Commentary on I Corinthians 2 1973
- Through the year with J.B. Phillips : devotional readings for every day 1974 (Renamed 365 meditations by J.B. Phillips for this day in 1975)
- Peter's Portrait of Jesus: A Commentary on the Gospel of Mark and the Letters of Peter 1976
- The Newborn Christian: 114 Readings from J. B. Phillips 1978
- A Man Called Jesus: the Gospel Story in 26 Short Plays 1978
- The Living Gospels of Jesus Christ 1981
- The Price of Success autobiography, 1984
- "The Problems of Making a Contemporary Translation", The Churchman (June 1961), 88–95; reprinted The Bible Translator, 16:1 (1965), 25–32.
