= The New Testament in Modern English =

1958 English translation of the New Testament

- Full name: The New Testament in Modern English
- Abbreviation: Phi
- NT published: 1958
- Derived from: New Testament
- Textual basis: Nestle Greek text (NT)
- Translation type: dynamic equivalence
- Copyright: Copyrighted
- Religious affiliation: Anglican
- John 3:16 For God loved the world so much that he gave his only Son, so that every one who believes in him shall not be lost, but should have eternal life.

The New Testament in Modern English (Phi) is an English translation of the New Testament of the Bible translated by Anglican clergyman J. B. Phillips first published in 1958.

BibleGateway.com describes the translation as

Up-to-date and forceful involving the reader in the dramatic events and powerful teaching of the New Testament. It brings home the message of Good News as it was first heard two thousand years ago.

This publication refers to the translation's copyright dates as 1960 and 1972.

== See also ==
- Four Prophets, a 1963 rendering by Phillips of the Books of Amos, Hosea, First Isaiah and Micah.
