= Matthew 15 =

- ← chapter 14 chapter 16 →
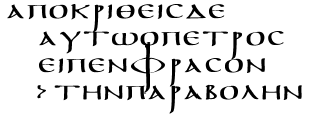
- Gospel of Matthew 15:15 on a piece of Uncial 0237, from 6th century; containing the variant of parable
- Book: Gospel of Matthew
- Category: Gospel
- Christian Bible part: New Testament
- Order in the Christian part: 1

Matthew 15 is the fifteenth chapter in the Gospel of Matthew in the New Testament section of the Christian Bible. It concludes the narrative about Jesus' ministry in Galilee and can be divided into the following subsections:

- Discourse on Defilement (15:1–20)
- Exorcising the Canaanite woman's daughter (15:21–28)
- Healing many on a mountain (15:29–31)
- Feeding the 4000 (15:32–39)

== Text ==
The original text was written in Koine Greek. This chapter is divided into 39 verses.

=== Textual witnesses ===
Some early manuscripts containing the text of this chapter are:

- Codex Vaticanus (325–350)
- Codex Sinaiticus (330–360)
- Codex Bezae (~400)
- Codex Washingtonianus (~400)
- Codex Ephraemi Rescriptus (~450)
- Codex Purpureus Rossanensis (6th century)
- Codex Petropolitanus Purpureus (6th century; extant verses 14–31)
- Codex Sinopensis (6th century; extant verses 11–39)
- Uncial 0237 (6th century; extant verses 12–15,17–19)

== Locations and timing ==
Most of the events recorded in this chapter took place in Galilee. Verse 1 refers to scribes and Pharisees who have come from Jerusalem. The word order is "scribes and Pharisees" in the Textus Receptus, but "Pharisees and scribes" in Westcott and Hort's critical edition. Theologian Johann Bengel makes the point that these events could not therefore have taken place at the time of the Passover.

Verses 21 to 28 refer to an excursion to the region of Tyre and Sidon, after which Jesus returned to Galilee and 'skirted' or walked beside the Sea of Galilee to a mountain on the lake's eastern shore. Harold H. Buls notes that "at this point in the life of Jesus", he is "less than a year from his suffering and death".

At the close of the chapter (verse 39), Jesus "got into the boat, and came to the region of Magdala" or Magadan. According to E. H. Plumptre in Anglican bishop Charles Ellicott's Commentary, "the better [manuscripts] give the reading Magadan. The King James Version translates this text as "the coasts of Magdala". Heinrich Ewald thinks the reference may be to Megiddo, but Heinrich Meyer criticises this opinion because Megiddo is "too far inland". The parallel passage in the Gospel of Mark gives (in the majority of manuscripts) a quite different place name, Dalmanutha, although a handful of manuscripts give either Magdala or Magadan, possibly through assimilation with the Matthean text.

== Verse 16 ==
Then he said, "Are you also still without understanding?"

— New Revised Standard Version

So Jesus said, "Are you also still without understanding?"

— New King James Version

Meyer suggests that the word "Jesus" in this verse is probably an addition.

== See also ==
- Galilee
- Magdala
- Miracles of Jesus
- Sidon
- Tyre
- Related Bible parts: Mark 7, Mark 8
