= Internal consistency of the Bible =

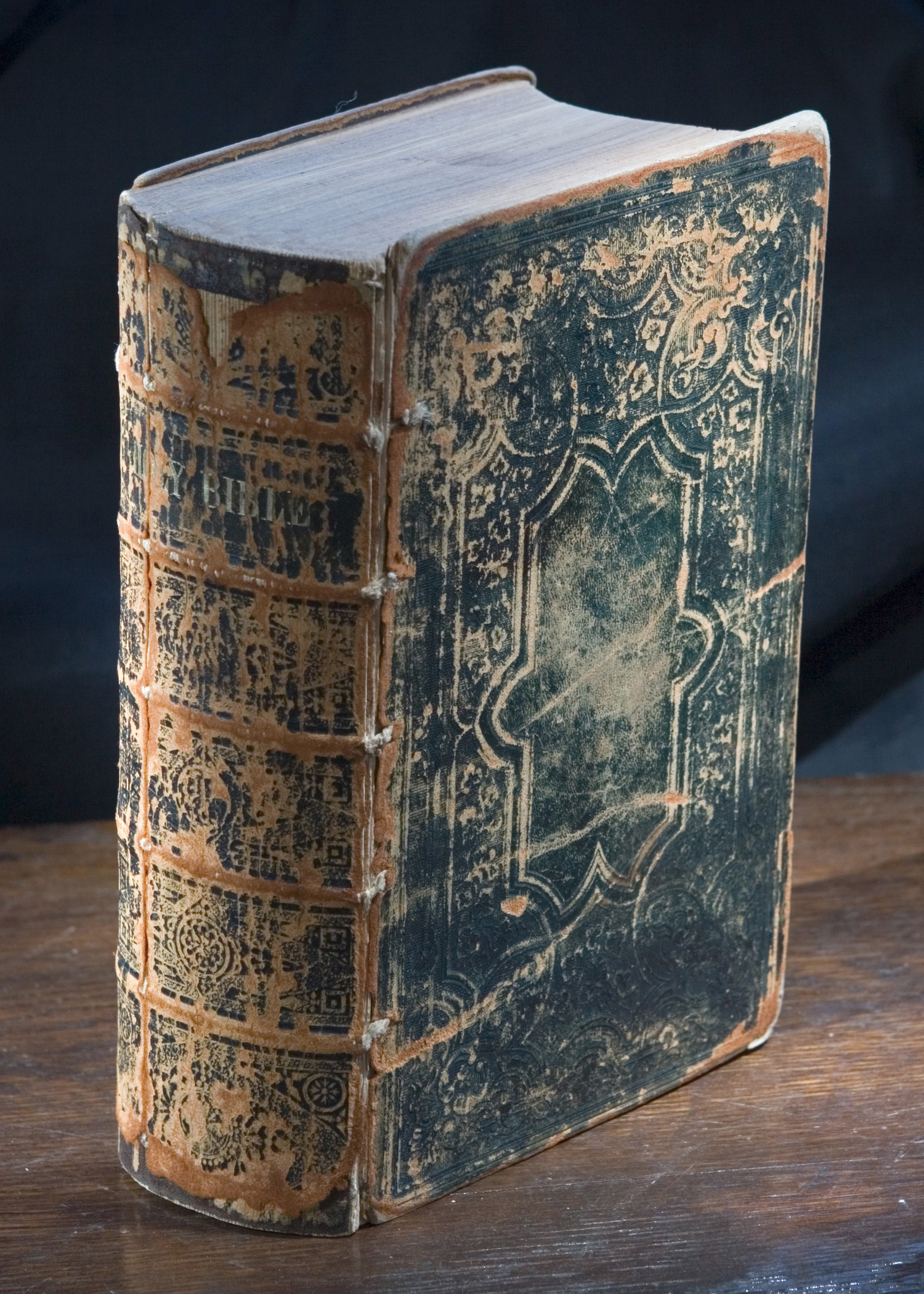
An American Christian family's Bible dating to 1859

Disputes regarding the internal consistency and textual integrity of the Bible have a long history.

Classic texts that discuss questions of inconsistency from a critical secular perspective include the Tractatus Theologico-Politicus by Baruch Spinoza, the Dictionnaire philosophique of Voltaire, the Encyclopédie of Denis Diderot and The Age of Reason by Thomas Paine.

== Consistency ==
For many believers, the internal consistency of the Jewish and Christian scriptures is important because they feel that any inconsistencies or contradictions, or, for some, particular kinds of inconsistencies or contradictions, could challenge belief in the truth of their contents and the view that they are of divine origin. On the subject of the Jewish text, B. Barry Levy writes about the Torah that "the textual integrity of every biblical book should be extremely important to those interested in either the Hebrew Bible or classical Jewish thought". Levy also writes that, "Despite the popular, pious-sounding assumption that the Torah text is letter-perfect, frequent and extensive discussions by highly respected rabbinic leaders demonstrate that they, in some measure similar to modern scholars, were concerned about its true textual state; some of them even tried to clarify known textual doubts and to eliminate many troublesome inconsistencies." However, the modern writer Joshua Golding states that even though it contains inconsistencies, this "does not imply that God did not reveal the Torah".

On the other hand, Christian evangelists John Ankerberg and Dillon Burroughs argue that "the Bible's teachings, if perfect, must be consistent with one another" and that "the Bible is consistent with itself from beginning to end". Similarly, Catholic writers have stated that "If we believe the Scriptures are divinely inspired, we must also believe them to be internally coherent". Pastor Erwin Lutzer argues that the Bible is consistent in asserting that it is the word of God, and that this is a reason for accepting that it is of divine origin: "The sixty-six books speak with a consistent voice that these are the words of God". An internally consistent Bible is also helpful in Christian apologetics defending the Bible's divine origin since it implies a common transcendent source for this anthology of books written by various people who had no contact with each other.

Critics of traditional Jewish and Christian belief have also argued that inconsistencies undermine the value of scripture. The deist minister Joseph Barker, speaking in 1854 at the Hartford Bible Convention, claimed that the Bible is "the most inconsistent, the most monstrous and blasphemous representations of God that can possibly be conceived by the human mind" and argued that "The book that contradicts science and contradicts itself is a book of no authority whatsoever". A modern Islamic critic argues that if the Bible can be shown to be inconsistent, "then those who preach the Bible and read the Bible must seriously reconsider their source of information concerning their faith."

One response to this kind of criticism is to argue that no inconsistencies exist. As theologian John Barton explains, some Christians read the Bible with the assumption that "Scripture is self-consistent", and that if there appear to be contradictions between two texts, they believe that "more careful reading is required to show that they really cohere". Barton argues that "this is not the Bible that we have in fact got". He also points out that Judaism understands that texts "may sometimes be in dialogue with each other" and "something positive may emerge from a kind of creative tension".

Some Christian writers, however, while agreeing that inaccuracies and inconsistencies occur, argue that these do not necessarily make the Bible false and that it is no longer desirable to try to harmonize all four Gospels into "one consistent account", because "we have learned that each of the four Gospels has its own ... unique image of Jesus".

Randel Helms argues that the books of the Bible were written for and against different points of view—that the Bible's authors were often motivated to write because they wanted to challenge or correct those who had written before them.

== Religious views ==
=== Jewish ===
The Torah is viewed by some as the literal word of God, dictated to Moses. According to the 12th-century Jewish scholar Maimonides, "The Torah that we have today is the one dictated to Moses by God". The Prophets, such as Jeremiah, Ezekiel, and Jonah, are said to have heard and reported the word of God, while the Writings (the category that includes books such as Psalms, Lamentations and Chronicles) "were excluded from the prophetic collection because their inspiration appeared to be human rather than Divine". However, "In the broadest sense, the Scriptures taken as a whole, and subsequently the totality of Jewish spiritual teaching, fall within the connotation of God's word."

Many modern Jewish scholars have an accommodating view of the nature of the Torah, not necessarily viewing it as strictly internally consistent.

=== Christian ===
Justin Martyr, a 2nd-century Christian writer, declared the Septuagint, the Greek translation of the Hebrew Bible generally preferred in the early Church, to be "completely free of errors".

Thomas Aquinas wrote that "the author of Holy Scripture is God". The Westminster Confession of Faith (1646) asserts that the Bible's authority depends "wholly upon God (who is truth itself), the Author thereof; and therefore it is to be received, because it is the Word of God".

Some Christian groups, such as the Roman Catholic and Eastern Orthodox churches follow the Jewish practice of describing certain books as apocrypha (although not all churches regard the same list of books as apocryphal, see also biblical apocrypha).

Assertions that the Bible contains inconsistencies contradict Martin Luther's statement that "God cannot lie." Luther accepted that mistakes and inconsistencies existed, but concluded that they did not necessarily undermine the truth of the Gospel.

German Lutheran theologian Andreas Osiander took a different view, proposing in Harmonia evangelica (1537) a number of attempted harmonisations, including the suggestion that Jesus must have been crowned with thorns twice, and that there were three separate episodes of cleansing of the Temple.

Modern Christian approaches to biblical consistency are reminiscent of the split between Luther and Osiander, and can be broadly divided between inerrancy and infallibility. The former, followed by the Southern Baptist Convention and by evangelical Christians in the United States in general, holds that the original biblical manuscripts have "God for its author, salvation for its end, and truth, without any mixture of error, for its matter", so that "all Scripture is totally true and trustworthy": Gleason Archer, whose reconciliation of difficult texts echoes that of Osiander, allows that textual scholarship and an understanding of the historical context of individual passages is necessary to establish true, original biblical text, but that text, once discovered, is without error.

The infallibility approach followed by some theologians and scholars, primarily of the Catholic and Anglican churches, and some mainline Protestant denominations, avoids many of the pitfalls of inerrancy by holding that the Bible is without error only in matters essential to salvation, and that guidance is necessary for the correct interpretation of apparent inconsistencies; the latter part being common to all Orthodox and Catholic Christians, regardless of views of biblical inerrancy, being the primary role of the magisterium.

According to Roman Catholic biblical scholar Raymond E. Brown, this approach found expression in Dei verbum, one of the documents adopted at the Second Vatican Council, which stated that scripture teaches "solidly, faithfully and without error that truth which God wanted put into sacred writings for the sake of salvation," meaning that Scripture is inerrant only "to the extent to which it conforms to the salvific purpose of God," without necessarily being reliable on matters such as paleontology or political history; this view is challenged by some conservative Catholic scholars.

=== Muslim ===
In the Middle Ages, Muslim scholars such as Ibn Hazm, al-Qurtubi, al-Maqrizi, Ibn Taymiyyah, and Ibn al-Qayyim, based on their interpretation of Quranic and other traditions, maintained that Jews and Christians had tampered with the scriptures, a concept known as tahrif.

The theme of tahrif was first explored in the writings of Ibn Hazm (10th century), who rejected claims of Mosaic authorship and posited that Ezra was the author of the Torah. His arguments against the authenticity of the biblical text in both the Tanakh and New Testament included chronological and geographical inaccuracies and contradictions; what he considered theological impossibilities (anthropomorphic expressions, stories of extramarital sex, and the attributing of sins to prophets), as well as what he saw as a lack of reliable transmission (tawatur) of the text. He argued that the falsification of the Torah could have taken place while there existed only one copy kept by the Aaronic priesthood of the Temple in Jerusalem. Ibn Hazm's arguments had a major impact upon Muslim literature and scholars, and these and other polemical ideas were modified only slightly by some later authors.

Ibn al-Layth, Ibn Rabban, and Ibn Qutayba, found that there had been no corruption of the text but denounced as tahrif what they considered misleading interpretations of the text. The 14th-century commentator Ibn Khaldun argued in the Muqaddimah (Introduction) that no distortion had taken place: "the statement concerning the alteration is unacceptable to thorough scholars and cannot be understood in its plain meaning".

== Biblical criticism and criticism of the Bible ==
The study of inconsistencies in the Bible has a long history. In his 1670 Tractatus Theologico-Politicus, Baruch Spinoza considered the Bible to be "a book rich in contradictions". In the 18th century, Thomas Paine in The Age of Reason compiled many of the Bible's self-contradictions. And in 1860, William Henry Burr produced a list of 144 self-contradictions in the Bible.

Biblical scholars have studied inconsistencies in and between texts and canons as a means to study the bible and the societies that created and influenced it. The field has given rise to theories such as Julius Wellhausen's documentary hypothesis and the deuteronomistic history (concerning the origins of the Torah and the history of Israel contained in the books from Joshua to Kings respectively).

=== Biblical canons ===
The question of inconsistency covers not only the text but even the composition of scripture. Since the Bible never enumerates its own component parts, those who believe it is inerrant must appeal to extra-biblical authority to justify which books to include.

Over the centuries, different communities have accepted shifting collections of books. The size of these biblical canons varies enormously, from the Samaritans, who consider the five books of the Torah alone to be authoritative, to the Ethiopian Bible, which contains all the books of all other churches plus such titles as the Book of Josephus and the Epistle of Clement to the Corinthians.

The contents of canons have varied over time, books regarded as authoritative by some Christians at some points in history being excluded from the collections of later communities—this was the fate of the many apocryphal Gospels from the first few centuries of the Church (the Gospel of Thomas is an example); books long regarded as canonical in one branch of Christianity may be dropped by others on doctrinal grounds (the fate of the deuterocanonical books, canonical in the Roman Catholic and Eastern Orthodox Church but repudiated by the Protestants because they are not included in the Hebrew Bible and supported doctrines to which the Protestant reformers objected such as the intercession of saints, purgatory, prayers for the dead etc. Some books that could have been included, such as the Book of Enoch, quoted as scriptural in Jude 1:14–15, were excluded from the canons of almost all later communities (see Canonicity of the Book of Enoch).

Religion	Accepted canon
Judaism	Hebrew canon (24 books)
Samaritanism	Samaritan canon (5 books)
Roman Catholicism	Catholic canon (73 books)
Protestantism	Protestant canon (66 books)
Eastern Orthodox Church	Eastern Orthodox canon (78 books)
Ethiopian Orthodox Church	Orthodox Tewahedo canon (81 books, variable)

=== Attribution of the books ===
The question of internal consistency in the Bible also involves the attribution of authorship to its books. For instance, the words of the Torah, or the first five books of the Old Testament, have traditionally been believed to be by the hand of Moses, and the New Testament Gospels have been attributed to the Four Evangelists. Modern scholarship calls these attributions into question.

Eliot Rabin writes: "For the past 400 years, readers have been openly questioning the traditional attribution of these five books to Moses." For instance, he quotes Thomas Hobbes in his 1651 Leviathan as writing that, when Genesis 12:6 has "and the Canaanite was then in the land", it could not have been written by Moses. Hobbes may have been the first European to question this attribution in print, arguing that the words can "only sensibly be used by someone who is writing when the Canaanites no longer are in the land ... But the Canaanites were in the land when Moses was alive." Rabin also quotes the 11th-century rabbi, Rashi, as saying that Moses could not have written, in Deuteronomy 34:5, "And Moses died there", but it must have been written by Joshua. However, it is also noted that the second-century commentator Rabbi Meir, has it that God dictated those words to Moses, who wrote them down with a tear in his eye.

The traditional authorship of the New Testament remains debated. M. N. Ralph says that the Gospels represent compilations of written and oral sources, though Bond notes source criticism of the gospels is generally out of fashion and emphasizes the evangelist's authorial creativity.

=== Manuscripts ===
Manuscripts also differ. Usually the differences are minor, but occasionally they are significant, as in the case of the Comma Johanneum, a clause in the First Epistle of John that bears explicit witness to the doctrine of the Trinity, which is found written only in Latin in the 4th century at the earliest, but is not observed in any Greek manuscripts prior to 1215. A similar example from the Old Testament is the difference between the Septuagint and Masoretic descriptions of the battle of David and Goliath: the Septuagint version is shorter and avoids the narrative inconsistencies of the familiar Masoretic story, notably the famous incident of Saul asking who David is as though he does not know his own harpist and shield-bearer.

There are also important differences between the Masoretic and Samaritan version of the Pentateuch in the readings of many sentences. Some distinctions seem motivated by (or reflect) philosophical differences between Judaism and Samaritanism. Some are obvious, like the inclusion of a passage in the Samaritan version of the Ten Commandments that restates the command to build an altar on Mount Gerizim and says that Mount Gerizim is the site where all future sacrifices must be offered. Since the location of God's holy site is probably the central original difference between Judaism and Samaritanism, it makes sense that this passage is in one version and not the other.

=== Contradictions ===
Most questions of biblical inconsistency relate to contradictions in the narrative. Some relate to apparently minor details; for example: the number of soldiers in an army (e.g. 1 Chronicles 21:5 vs. 2 Samuel 24:9), the year a certain king began his reign (e.g. 2 Chronicles 36:9 vs. 2 Kings 24:8), the details of Apostle Paul's itinerary (Acts 9, 11, 15,18:22, 21 vs. Galatians 1:18, 2:1). In some cases, seemingly trivial points of differences can actually have an enormous significance for the interpretation of a book or for the reconstruction of the history of Ancient Israel, how the world was created, why God allows suffering, or the religious significance of Jesus's death.

Modern scholars find inconsistencies in the Old Testament and Torah and ascribe many of them to the process by which they were created. For example, the documentary hypothesis asserts that repetitions and contradictions are the result of texts that have been woven together from diverse sources written by different authors, at different times.

On this point, Ronald Witherup gives the example of Genesis 1 and Genesis 2, which most scholars view as two separate stories of creation written by different authors in different time periods. "Most biblical scholars accept Genesis 1 as originating around the sixth century B.C. with a group of scribes who were concerned about the preservation of the liturgical traditions of the Jews (thus the concern for the seven-day schema of creation and the notion of the sabbath). Genesis 2, on the other hand, originates from an earlier, more primitive tradition dated to around the tenth century B.C." Fundamentalists argue that this is simply the same story told twice, the first time (Gen 1:1–2:4) being poetic and the second one (Gen 2:4–25) being more anthropomorphic.

There are further examples of other types of inconsistency in the Old Testament. In the account of the slaughtering of an animal before the Temple, it states that the animal "was killed at the entrance to the tabernacle, north of the altar, and cut up". The most natural interpretation of the Hebrew wording is that the slaughtering was done by the one making the offering rather than by the priest. If so, it contradicts Ezekiel 44:11, where it is done by the Levites, and 2 Chr 29:22, 24 where done by the priests.

There are several places in the Old Testament where numerical figures can be directly compared. For example, both Ezra 2:1–65 and Nehemiah 7:6–67 present the list of Jewish families that "came up out of the captivity of the exiles ..." and returned to Jerusalem and Judah". But the two lists disagree on the number of members of each family. In total, there are nearly twenty numerical discrepancies between the lists. Furthermore, in both cases a total figure of 42,360 people is given, but the partial figures do not add up to the total. A third version of the list exists in the apocryphal book 1 Esdras.

In Deuteronomy chapter 4, verses 1 and 8 state that Moses is about to teach the laws "today". Verse 8, in the Hebrew text, even says that the "entire Torah" is to be taught today. However, verse 5 suggests that the laws have already been delivered some time in the past.

The Oxford Bible Commentary notes that:

as has long been recognized, there remain a number of variations or inconsistencies of detail, which suggests that two or more accounts have been combined. In particular, the creative acts are introduced in different ways. While in some cases God creates simply by speaking ("And God said..."), in others we are told that he performed certain actions: he made, separated, named, blessed, placed.

However, orthodox rabbis, such as Mordechai Breuer, deny that such inconsistencies are evidence that the words were not all created by God. He asserts that such hypotheses are false, and that the contradictory portrayals of creation are not because they were written by different authors. "Instead we refer them to the different qualities of God."

=== Copying errors in the Old Testament ===
Jewish scholars are concerned that all copies of the Torah are identical, and that each copy is consistent in its statements and in its language. The aim is to preserve the work in a condition as close to its original state as possible. This extends to consistency in spelling and the use of individual words.

B. Barry Levy notes that the 16th-century Rabbi Ibn Zimra recounted "how he restored the scrolls to their original state" and noted "the importance of having textual consistency in the scrolls, because criticisms of how Jews preserved and transmitted the Torah text contained accusations that they willfully changed it." Levy also suggests that "Torah scrolls remain prized and frequently used ritual objects, and scribes have continually worked as carefully as possible to copy them, always holding dear the belief that they were producing as accurate and correct a text as they could. Unfortunately even this commitment and care could not guarantee a letter-perfect text".

Furthermore, Shnayer Leiman writes that "Errors have crept into the best Torah scrolls. Every so often a Torah has to be returned to the ark due to an error discovered while being read in public."

The discovery of the Hebrew Bible texts among the Dead Sea Scrolls has been taken to demonstrate a high degree of accuracy in the transmission of Old Testament texts:

The biblical scrolls are significant because they disclose the manner in which ancient scribes and copyists transmitted the Bible from generation to generation. These scrolls also provide us with confidence that our Old Testament has been preserved with a high degree of accuracy...

=== Internal consistency of the text ===
Several grammatical errors are known to appear in copies of the Torah. As Shai Cherry notes, "Since one of the Rabbinic assumptions is that the Torah is perfect, at a minimum one would expect there to be no grammatical mistakes. After all, shouldn't God be an inerrant grammarian?" For examples of such mistakes, Cherry notes that, in the Cain and Abel story, where 'sin' is mentioned, "sin (chatat) is feminine, but the predicate is masculine". Rabbis have suggested that this is because sin starts out weak like a woman, but ends as strong as a man. Also, in verse 7 of this story, which concerns 'daughters' so that all four suffixes should be feminine, two of them are masculine. Cherry says that such problems ought to be ascribed to "sloppy editing", but that those who believe the Torah is perfect would say that these errors were put there intentionally.

=== Theology ===
Christian theologians agree that the New Testament has a single and consistent theological focus on the salvific nature of Christ, but the Hebrew Bible/Old Testament consists of several different theologies. Some of these complement each other, while others are contradictory, even within the same book. Despite the lack of a single unifying theology, common themes recur, including (although no list can be exhaustive) monotheism, the divine origins of human morality, God's election of a chosen people, the idea of the coming Messiah, and the concepts of sin, faithfulness, and redemption. The study of these is central to both Jewish and Christian theologies, even if they differ in their approaches. For example, although both religions believe in the coming Messiah, the Jewish expectation is different from the Christian view.

Within Christianity, themes such as the nature of God (trinitarianism and nontrinitarianism), nature of Jesus, views of the old covenant, original sin, predestination, ordination of women, hell, biblical prophecies, etc. have continued to be a matter of dispute among theologians and various denominations.

=== New Testament ===
The New Testament has been preserved in three major manuscript traditions: the 4th century AD Alexandrian text-type; the Western text-type, also very early but prone to paraphrase and other corruptions; and the Byzantine text-type, which makes up over 80% of all manuscripts, the majority comparatively very late in the tradition. Scholars regard the Alexandrian text-type as generally more authoritative when treating textual variations. The majority of differences are minor—matters such as variant spellings—although at a few points the oldest manuscripts show important inconsistencies compared with the more recent ones: these include the endings of Mark 16, describing Jesus' post-resurrection appearances, from the Gospel of Mark; the absence from John of the story of the woman taken in adultery; and an explicit reference to the Trinity in 1 John (the Comma Johanneum). Sixteen New Testament verses in the King James Version (published in 1611) are not included in more modern English translations, as scholars believe they were later additions to the text.

All major modern Christian communions accept a uniform canon of 27 books, although a few small and isolated communities have either fewer or more. Nevertheless, the idea of a complete and clear-cut canon of the New Testament existing from Apostolic times has no foundation in history, and the canon of the New Testament, like that of the Old, is the result of a historical process. The very idea of a closed canon did not exist prior to the 2nd century, when it became necessary to counter movements such as Marcionism. By the end of the 4th century unanimity had been achieved in the West concerning the New Testament canon as it is today, and by the 5th century most of the East had come into harmony by accepting the Book of Revelation. Nonetheless, a full dogmatic articulation of the canon for Roman Catholicism was not made until the Council of Trent of 1546, as until then the authority of the Scriptures was not considered higher than that of Sacred Tradition, papal bulls, and ecumenical councils. Martin Luther revived the antilegomena dispute by suggesting the removal of Jude, James, Hebrews, and Revelation; this was not generally accepted by his followers, but these books are still ordered last in the German-language Luther Bible. The canons of other important communions were defined in the Thirty-Nine Articles of 1563 for the Church of England, the Westminster Confession of Faith of 1647 for Presbyterianism, and the Synod of Jerusalem of 1672 for the Greek Orthodox.

==== Internal consistency ====
Biblical scholar Bruce M. Metzger mentions several internal inconsistencies in the New Testament in earlier manuscripts that later scribes attempted to correct:

In the earlier manuscripts of Mark 1:2, the composite quotation from Malachi 3:1 and Isaiah 40:3 is introduced by the formula "As it is written in Isaiah the Prophet". Later scribes, sensing this involves a difficulty replaced "As it is written in Isaiah the Prophet" with the general statement "As it is written in the prophets". Since the quotation, which Matthew (27:9) attributes to the prophet Jeremiah, actually comes from Zechariah (11:12f), it is not surprising that some scribes sought to mend the error either by substituting the correct name or by omitting the name altogether. A few scribes attempted to harmonize the Johannine account of the chronology of the Passion with that in Mark by changing 'sixth hour' of John 19:14 to 'third hour' (which appears in Mark 15:25). At John 1:28, Origen altered Bethany to Bethabara in order to remove what he regarded as a geographical difficulty, and this reading is extant today in MSS. 33 69 and many others, including those behind the King James Version. The statement in Mark 8:31, that 'the Son of man must suffer many things ... and be killed and after three days rise again', seems to involve a chronological difficulty, and some copyists changed the phrase to the more familiar expression, 'on the third day'. The author of the Epistle to the Hebrews places the golden altar of incense in the Holy of Holies (Heb. 9:4), which is contrary to the Old Testament description of the Tabernacle (Exod. 30:1-6). The scribe of Codex Vaticanus and the translator of the Ethiopic version correct the account by transferring the words to 9:2, where the furniture of the Holy Place is itemized.

In the 2nd century AD, Tatian produced a gospel text called Diatessaron by weaving together all four gospels into one. The gospel compilation eliminated all the discrepancies that exist between the four gospels. For example, it omits the genealogies of Jesus in Matthew and Luke. To fit in all canonical material, Tatian created his own narrative sequence, which is different from both the synoptic sequence and John's sequence.

==== The Gospels ====
Francis Watson argues that alleged contradictions are far from trivial and at the heart of Christian faith and life, though Dale Allison notes that most variations in the Synoptics are relatively minor.

In the 2nd century, Assyrian Christian apologist Tatian (120-180 CE) produced the Diatesseron, the first known gospel harmony: it unified the narratives of the four canonical gospels into a single coherent narrative of Jesus's life and death, only excluding the genealogies of Jesus and the so-called pericope adulterae. It enjoyed great popularity in the Syriac Church, but was eventually abandoned in the 5th century.

The Church Father Origen (184/185 – 253/254 CE) replied to the pagan philosopher Celsus, a critic of Christianity, who had complained that some Christians had remodelled the Gospel to answer objections, agreeing that some had done so. However, he stated that he did not believe the problem was widespread, nor did he approve of the practice, further stating that he believed that those making the alternations introduced "heresies opposed to the meaning of the doctrine of Jesus".

In his Harmony of the Gospels, Augustine of Hippo (354-430 CE) produced a 5th-century attempt to explain away all of the apparent contradictions he was aware of. He wrote that because there are those who would "rob [the Evangelists] of their credit as veracious historians", "we must prove that the writers in question do not stand in any antagonism to each other." Whereas more modern apologists, such as Gleason Archer, in producing a book that provides explanations for many Bible difficulties, writes: "Be fully persuaded in your own mind that an adequate explanation exists, even though you have not yet found it."

Of those who accept that there are inconsistencies, scholars such as Raymond Brown have examined contradictions in the Gospels, particularly in the infancy narratives of Christ. W. D. Davies and E. P. Sanders claim that: "on many points, especially about Jesus' early life, the evangelists were ignorant ... they simply did not know, and, guided by rumour, hope or supposition, did the best they could". More critical scholars see the nativity stories either as completely fictional accounts, or at least constructed from traditions that predate the Gospels.

As a further example, the "Markan Appendix" (Mark 16:9-20) "is universally accepted to have not been written by the author" of the Gospel of Mark, and it has been argued that Mark 16:9–20 was added later so that the Gospel of Mark originally ended at Mark 16:8. Similarly, the so-called "Pericope Adulterae" is almost universally accepted not to be part of the original Gospel of John, but a later addition. Since Eusebius reports that Papias of Hierapolis mentioned a similar episode narrated in the apocryphal Gospel of the Hebrews, Bart D. Ehrman suggests that such episode could have been originally part of such work; however, Kyle R. Hughes disagrees and states that the pericope was originally part of the Gospel of Luke.

Grammatico-historical exegesis is determining the meaning of scripture by understanding the author's environment outside the Bible, as well as the scripture itself. R. T. France states this form of exegesis involves the "fullest possible use of linguistic, literary, historical, archaeological, and other data bearing on that author's environment".

France, regarding the "distinctive contribution" of each of the four gospels, commented, "In accepting that God intended his church to have four Gospels, not just one, Christians have also recognized that each has something different to say about Jesus. It is only after we have listened to each in its individuality that we can hope to gain the full richness which comes from the 'stereoscopic' vision of Jesus as seen through four different pairs of eyes!"

==== Examples ====
A wide variety of inconsistencies have been noted both within the New Testament and between the New Testament and the Hebrew scriptures. These fall into a number of broad categories. The more prominent are identified and discussed below, with examples.

===== Gospels =====
Internal consistency within the synoptic gospels has been analysed by many scholars. A well-known example is the nativity narratives found in the Gospel of Matthew (Matthew 1:1–6) and the Gospel of Luke (Luke 3:32–34). Each gives a genealogy of Jesus, but the names, and even the number of generations, differ between the two. Apologists have suggested that the differences are the result of two different lineages, Matthew's from King David's son, Solomon, to Jacob, father of Joseph, and Luke's from King David's other son, Nathan, to Heli, father of Mary and father-in-law of Joseph. However, Geza Vermes points out that Luke makes no mention of Mary, and questions what purpose a maternal genealogy would serve in a Jewish setting. He also points out that Jesus is 42 generations away from King David in Luke, but only 28 generations away in Matthew.

In Ethics, Dietrich Bonhoeffer pointed out another conflict, between Matthew 12:30/Luke 11:23 ("He who is not with Me is against Me; and he who does not gather with Me scatters") and Mark 9:40/Luke 9:50("For he who is not against us [you] is for us [you]"). Bonhoeffer called these two sayings "the claim to exclusiveness and the claim to totality". He argued that both are necessary and that "The cross of Christ makes both sayings true." D. A. Carson commented similarly, adding he thought there are two different contexts where Mark 9:40/Luke 9:50describe the attitude listeners are to have to other possible disciples: when in doubt, be inclusive, while Matthew 12:30/Luke 11:23 describe the standard listeners should apply to themselves: be in no doubt of one's own standing. Other commentaries argue that, juxtaposed, the sayings declare the impossibility of neutrality.

New Testament scholarship tends to view these as one statement that has either been preserved in two different forms or has been altered by the Gospel writers to present a point of view that expresses the needs of the Christian community at the time. Mark, the earliest of the Gospels, presents the 'inclusive' formulation, in association with an account of Jesus rebuking his followers for stopping someone from carrying out exorcisms in his name. The Gospel of Matthew has the other, 'exclusive' version, preceded by a story about a strong man; the Gospel of Mark also includes this story, but without the concluding observation. The Luke version presents both versions. There is still lively discussion about which version is the more authentic.

Barton and Muddiman note that "In Mk 16:1 there are three women at the tomb, in Mt 28:1 two, and in Lk 23:55–24:10 more than three. In Mark and Luke they come with spices to anoint Jesus, but in the Fourth Gospel this has already been done. According to Allison the resurrection narratives in the gospels agree on "the basic facts," citing Lessing on differences between accounts by historians Livy, Polybius, and Tacitus on the same event.

Raymond E. Brown notes the apparent disagreements between the New Testament books in reporting the words of Jesus concerning his prediction of the destruction of the Temple. In Mark 13:2 it is reported as a direct statement: "And Jesus answering said unto him, Seest thou these great buildings? there shall not be left one stone upon another, that shall not be thrown down." However, in Mark 14:57–58, the event becomes words from people who "bear false witness against him"; in Mark 15:29, Jesus' words are used to blaspheme him; and in Acts 6:13–14, similar words are again said to be from those bearing false witness. Furthermore, Matthew 26:60–61 and 27:39–40 has people accusing Jesus and blaspheming him as someone who had said such words, while John 2:19–21 reports Jesus saying directly that the sanctuary would be destroyed, but actually speaking "of the sanctuary of his body". While Sanders writes it is "overwhelmingly probable that Jesus did something in the temple and said something about its destruction", Brown suggests that the various accounts show that Jesus did not have God's detailed foreknowledge of what was to happen to the Temple. In evidence for this lack of detailed prescience, he points out that there are many stones left upon other stones in the remains of Herod's temple, for instance in the Wailing Wall.

Bart Ehrman argues that the concept of Jesus's preexistence as a divine being who became human is only claimed in the Gospel of John. However, some scholars disagree, locating pre-existent and divine Christology within the Pauline epistles and synoptic gospels.

Ehrman points out that while Mark 14 has Jesus crucified the morning after the Passover, John has Jesus crucified on the following day, the "day of Preparation for the Passover". Ehrman suggests the John author changed the day for theological reasons: John is the only gospel that explicitly identifies Jesus as the "Lamb of God", so has Jesus dying on the same day as the Passover lambs. Ancient compositional practices involved chronological displacement and compression, with even reliable biographers like Plutarch displaying them.

Some apologists have noted that "day of Preparation for the Passover" might refer to the Sabbath Preparation Day that occurs during the Passover week (i.e., Friday), thus dissolving the apparent contradiction between Mark 14 and John 19:14.

===== Acts of the Apostles =====
In the Encyclopedia of Bible Difficulties, Archer examines two verses in Acts describing the Conversion of Paul which are sometimes perceived as a contradiction:

- "The men who travelled with him stood speechless, hearing the voice but seeing no one" Acts 9:7
- "And those who were with me saw the light, to be sure, but did not understand the voice of the One who was speaking to me" Acts 22:9

Archer claims that the original Greek shows "there is no real contradiction between these two statements" because "Greek makes a distinction between hearing a sound as a noise (in which case the object to the verb 'to hear' takes the genitive case) and hearing a voice as a thought-conveying message (in which case it takes the accusative)" and "in neither account is it stated that his companions ever heard that Voice in the accusative case". Archer points to similar circumstances where "the crowd who heard the sound of the Father talking to the Son in John 12:28 ... perceived it only as thunder".

Acts 7:15–16 is another troublesome part:

And Jacob went down to Egypt and there he and our fathers died. From there they were removed to Shechem and laid in the tomb which Abraham had purchased for a sum of money from the sons of Hamor in Shechem.

The verse places Jacob's burial in Shechem, contradicting verses in Genesis which place the patriarchs' tomb in Hebron. Albert Barnes writes "the text now stands, it is an evident error".

Some apologists have noted that in most translations (as in NASBu) ‘died’ is a plural form, but in the Greek ‘died’ is a singular form with ‘Jacob’ as subject, not ‘Jacob and the fathers’ as subject. And so ‘they were removed’ refers to the last mentioned plural form, i.e. ‘the fathers’ and not to ‘Jacob and the fathers’, thus dissolving the apparent contradiction.

===== Gospel and Acts =====
In Matthew 27:3–8, Judas returns the bribe Christians believe he had immorally accepted for handing over Jesus, throwing the money into the temple before hanging himself. The temple priests, unwilling to return the defiled money to the treasury, used it instead to buy a field known as the Potter's Field, as a plot in which to bury strangers. In Acts 1:18, on the other hand, Judas, having not committed suicide out of guilt, used the bribe money to buy the field himself, and his death in the field is attributed thus: "falling headlong, he burst open in the middle and all his intestines gushed out".

Raymond E. Brown points to the contradiction: "Luke's account of the death of Judas in Acts 1:18 is scarcely reconcilable with Matt 27:3–10." Harmonization of the two accounts has been tried since ancient times and occasionally still today. However, modern scholars tend to find these unconvincing, pointing out the absence of suicide in Acts and that ancient historical works could display differences when reporting events; variations between Tacitus, Suetonius, and Plutarch on Otho's death being similar to those in the gospels.

===== Epistles =====
The Tübingen school of historians founded by F. C. Baur believes that in Early Christianity, there was conflict between Pauline Christianity and the Jerusalem Church led by James the Just, Simon Peter, and John the Apostle, the so-called "Jewish Christians" or "Pillars of the Church". Paul believed that the gentiles and Jewish Christians were no longer obligated to keep the Mosaic law (Gal 2:21). The Jewish Christians disagreed, believing that everyone, including the gentiles, must keep the Mosaic law. In Galatians 2:14, part of the "Incident at Antioch", Paul publicly rebuked Peter for Judaizing.

Paul claims several times that believers are saved by divine grace, and that believers are therefore "not under law, but under grace". The Epistle of James, in contrast, claims that Christians are to obey the "whole law", that "a person is justified by what he does and not by faith alone", and that "faith without works is dead". Protestants, with their belief in salvation by faith alone, have had difficulty reconciling these contradictory views. Martin Luther, for example, asserted that the Epistle of James might be a forgery, and relegated it to an appendix in his Bible (although he later accepted its canonicity – see Antilegomena).

Some scholars believe that Paul and James do not contradict each other but speak about different questions. They assert that the perspective of Paul is different from, and complementary to, that of James: "When Paul claims that one is justified by faith alone, apart from works, he is referring to works that precede salvation. Conversely, when James insists on works as necessary to justification, he has in view works that follow and validate salvation." Paul states in various passages that works have to follow faith (Titus 2:11–12, Ephesians 2:10, Romans 6:13, Galatians 5:13, etc.).

In I Corinthians: "Inconsistencies have been found within later chapters, for instance between an apparently softer stance on sacrificial food in 8:1–13 and 10:22–11:1, and a harder line in 10:1–22." Also, the letter "seems to place a total ban on women's speech in church, which is strangely inconsistent with Paul's permission in 11:2–16 that (veiled) women could pray and prophesy.

However, some authors argue that there is no inconsistency in Paul's words. He consistently prohibits Christians from eating food sacrificed to idols; by appealing first to their obligation to love other believers and then to their obligation of exclusive faithfulness to Christ.

===== Old Testament versus New Testament =====
In the 2nd century CE, the Christian theologian Marcion composed a work (now lost) entitled Antithesis. In the Antithesis, Marcion set out in detail and discussed at length the contradictions between the Old Testament and New Testament. The Old and New Testaments, Marcion argued, cannot be reconciled to each other. The code of conduct advocated by Moses was "an eye for an eye", but Jesus set this precept aside. Marcion pointed to Isaiah 45:7 "I make peace and create evil, I the Lord do all these things". He contrasted this with Jesus' saying that "a tree was known by its fruit; a good tree cannot bring forth evil fruit" and then pointed to several injunctions and lessons in the Old Testament that the New Testament contradicts. For example, Elisha had children eaten by bears; Jesus said, "Let the little children come to me". Joshua had the sun stopped in order to prolong the slaughter of his enemies. Paul quoted Jesus as commanding "Let not the sun go down on your wrath" (Eph 4:26). In the Old Testament, divorce was permitted and so was polygamy; in the New Testament, neither is allowed. Moses enforced the Jewish Sabbath and Jewish law; Jesus has de-institutionalised both. Even within the Old Testament, Marcion found contradictions. For example, God commanded that no work should be done on the Sabbath, yet he told the Israelites to carry the Ark of the Covenant around Jericho seven times on the Sabbath. No graven image was to be made, yet Moses was directed to fashion a bronze serpent. Marcion therefore rejected the entire Old Testament.

One Christian view is that Jesus mediates a New Covenant relationship between God and his followers and abolished the Mosaic laws, according to the New Testament (Hebrews 10:15–18; Gal 3:23–25; 2 Cor 3:7–17; Eph 2:15; Heb 8:13, Rom 7:6 etc.). From a Jewish perspective however, the Torah was given to the Jewish people and B'nei Noah as an eternal covenant (for example Exod 31:16–17, Exod 12:14–17, Mal 3:6–7) and will never be replaced or added to (for example Deut 4:2, 13:1). There are differences of opinion as to how the new covenant affects the validity of biblical law. The differences are mainly as a result of attempts to harmonize biblical statements that the biblical law is eternal (Exodus 31:16–17, 12:14–17) with New Testament statements that suggest that it does not now apply at all, or at least does not fully apply. Most biblical scholars admit the issue of the law can be confusing and the topic of Paul and the law is still frequently debated among New Testament scholars (for example, see New Perspective on Paul, Pauline Christianity); hence the various views.

== See also ==
- Biblical literalism
- Criticism of Christianity
- Great Apostasy
