= Generation Hex =

Generation Hex may refer to:

- Generation Hex, a book coauthored by Dillon Burroughs and Marla Alupoaicei
- "Generation Hex" (Charmed), an episode of the television series Charmed
- Generation Hex, a book written by Jason Louv and published by The Disinformation Company
- Generation Hex, an Amalgam Comics series, featuring Generation Hex a team combining elements of DC Comics' Wild West characters and Marvel Comics' Generation X
- The generation of kids who grew up with the Harry Potter novels and/or movies.
