= Gospel harmony =

Compiling events of the biblical gospels

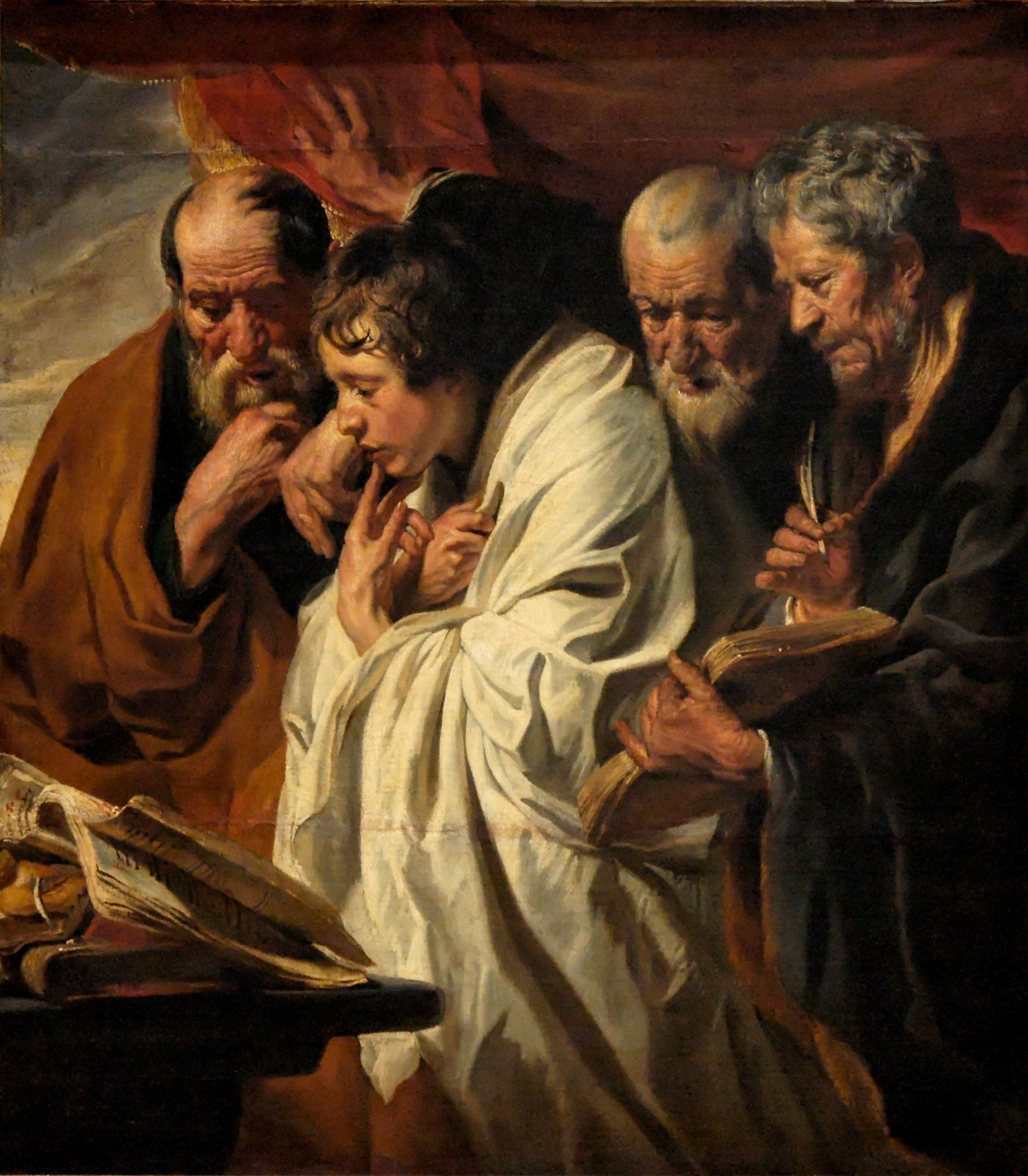
The Four Evangelists by Jacob Jordaens, 1625–1630, Louvre

A gospel harmony is a compilation of the canonical gospels of the New Testament into a single account. This may take the form either of a single, merged narrative, or a tabular format with one column for each gospel, technically known as a synopsis, although the word harmony is often used for both.

Harmonies are constructed for a variety of purposes: to create a readable and accessible piece of literature for the general public, to establish a scholarly chronology of events in the life of Jesus as depicted in the canonical gospels, or to better understand how the accounts relate to each other.

Among academics, the construction of harmonies has been favoured by conservative scholars, though some scholars, for example, B. S. Childs, oppose this. Students of historical criticism see the divergences between the gospel accounts as reflecting the construction of traditions by the early Christian communities. Among modern academics, attempts to construct a single story have largely been abandoned in favour of laying out the accounts in parallel columns for comparison, to allow critical study of the differences between them.

The earliest known harmony is the Diatessaron by Tatian in the 2nd century and variations based on the Diatessaron continued to appear in the Middle Ages. The 16th century witnessed a major increase in the introduction of gospel harmonies and the parallel column structure became widespread. At this time visual representations also started appearing, depicting the life of Christ in terms of a "pictorial gospel harmony", and the trend continued into the 19th–20th centuries.

== Overview ==
A gospel harmony is an attempt to collate the Christian canonical gospels into a single account. Harmonies are constructed by some writers in order to make the gospel story available to a wider audience, both religious and secular. Harmonies can be studied by scholars to establish a coherent chronology of the events depicted in the four canonical gospels in the life of Jesus, to better understand how the accounts relate to each other, and to critically evaluate their differences.

The terms harmony and synopsis have been used to refer to several different approaches to consolidating the canonical gospels. Technically, a "harmony" weaves together sections of scripture into a single narrative, merging the four gospels. There are four main types of harmony: radical, synthetic, sequential and parallel. By contrast, a "synopsis", much like a parallel harmony, juxtaposes similar texts or accounts in parallel format, synchronized by time, while preserving their individual identity, usually in columns. Harmonies may also take a visual form and be undertaken to create narratives for artistic purposes, as in the creation of picture compositions depicting the life of Christ.

The oldest approach to harmonizing consists of merging the stories into a single narrative, producing a text longer than any individual gospel. This creates the most straightforward and detailed account, and one that is likely to be most accessible to non-academic users, such as lay churchgoers or people who are reading the gospels as a work of literature or philosophy.

There are, however, difficulties in the creation of a consolidated narrative. As John Barton points out, it is impossible to construct a single account from the four gospels without changing at least some parts of the individual accounts.

One challenge with any form of harmonizing is that events are sometimes described in a different order in different accounts – the Synoptic Gospels, for instance, describe Jesus overturning tables in the Temple at Jerusalem in the last week of his life, whereas the Gospel of John records a counterpart event only towards the beginning of Jesus's ministry. Harmonists must either choose which time they think is correct, or conclude that separate events are described. Lutheran theologian Andreas Osiander, for instance, proposed in Harmonia evangelica (1537) that Jesus must have been crowned with thorns twice, and that there were three separate episodes of cleansing of the Temple. On the other hand, commentators have long noted that the individual gospels are not written in a rigorously chronological format. This means that an event can be described as falling at two different times and still be the same event, so that the substantive details can be properly brought together in a harmony, although the harmonist will still have the task of deciding which of the two times is more probable.

A less common but more serious difficulty arises if the gospels diverge in their substantive description of an event. An example is the incident involving the centurion whose servant is healed at a distance. In the Gospel of Matthew the centurion comes to Jesus in person; in the Luke version he sends Jewish elders. Since these accounts are probably describing the same event, the harmonist must decide which is the more accurate description or else devise a composite account.

The modern academic view, based on the broadly accepted principle that Matthew and Luke were written using Mark as a source, seeks to explain the differences between the texts in terms of this process of composition. For example, Mark describes John the Baptist as preaching the forgiveness of sins, a detail which is dropped by Matthew, perhaps in the belief that the forgiveness of sins was exclusive to Jesus.

The modern popularizing view, on the other hand, while acknowledging these difficulties, deemphasizes their importance. This view suggests that the divergences in the gospels are a relatively small part of the whole, and that the accounts show a great deal of overall similarity. The divergences can therefore be sufficiently discussed in footnote in the course of a consolidated narrative, and need not stand in the way of conveying a better overall view of the life of Jesus or of making this material more accessible to a wider readership.

To illustrate the concept of parallel harmony, a simple example of a "synopsis fragment" is shown here, consisting of just four episodes from the Passion. A more comprehensive parallel harmony appears in a section below.

Event	Matthew	Mark	Luke	John
Crown of thorns	Matthew 27:29	Mark 15:17		John 19:2–5
Blood curse	Matthew 27:24–25			
Carrying the cross	Matthew 27:27–33	Mark 15:20–22	Luke 23:26–32	John 19:16–17
Crucifixion of Jesus	Matthew 27:34–61	Mark 15:23–47	Luke 23:33–54	John 19:18–38

== Early Church and Middle Ages ==
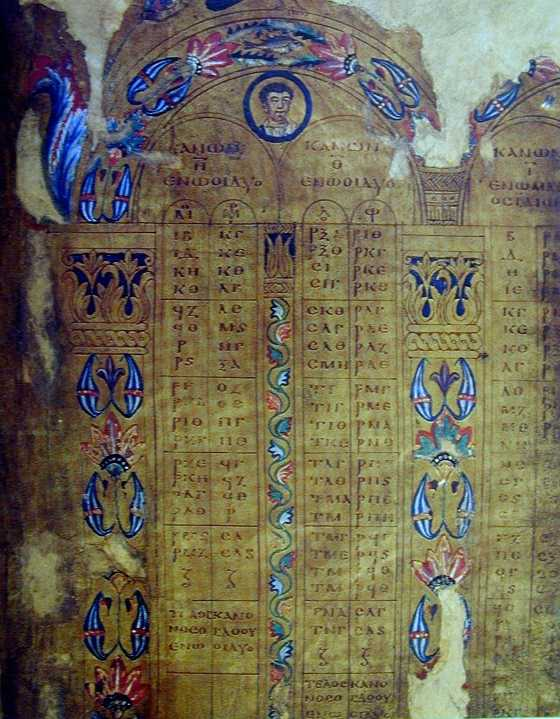
A 6th–7th-century use of the Eusebian Canons to organize the contents of the gospels in the London Canon Tables

Tatian's influential Diatessaron, which dates to about AD 160, was perhaps the first harmony. The Diatessaron reduced the number of verses in the four gospels from 3,780 to 2,769 without missing any event of teaching in the life of Jesus from any of the gospels. Some scholars believe Tatian may have drawn on one or more noncanonical gospels. The Gospel of the Ebionites, composed about the same time, is believed to have been a gospel harmony.

Variations based on the Diatessaron continued to appear in the Middle Ages. For example, the Codex Sangallensis (based on the 6th century Codex Fuldensis) dates to 830 and has a Latin column based on the Vulgate and an Old High German column that often resembles the Diatessaron, although errors frequently appear within it. The Liege harmony in the Limburg dialect (Liege University library item 437) is a key Western source of the Diatessaron and dates to 1280, although it was published much later. The two extant recensions of the Diatessaron in Medieval Italian are the single manuscript Venetian from the 13th or 14th century and the 26 manuscript Tuscan from the 14th–15th century.

In the 3rd century Ammonius of Alexandria developed the forerunner of modern synopsis (perhaps based on the Diatessaron) as the Ammonian Sections in which he started with the text of Matthew and copied along parallel events. There are no extant copies of the harmony of Ammonius and it is only known from a single reference in the letter from Eusebius to Carpianus. In the letter Eusebius also discusses his own approach, i.e. the Eusebian Canons in which the texts of the gospels are shown in parallel to help comparison among the four gospels.

In the 5th century, Augustine of Hippo wrote extensively on the subject in his book Harmony of the Gospels. Augustine viewed the variations in the gospel accounts in terms of the different focuses of the authors on Jesus: Matthew on royalty, Mark on humanity, Luke on priesthood and John on divinity.

Clement of Llanthony's Unum ex Quatuor (One from Four) was considered an improvement on previous gospel harmonies, although modern scholars sometimes opine that no major advances beyond Augustine emerged on the topic until the 15th century. Throughout the Middle Ages harmonies based on the principles of the Diatessaron continued to appear, e.g., the 'Evangelienbuch' of Otfrid von Weissenburg in Old High German, the Liege harmony by Plooij in Middle Dutch, and the Pepysian harmony in Middle English. The Pepysian harmony (Magdalene College, Cambridge, item Pepys 2498) dates to about 1400 and its name derives from having been owned by Samuel Pepys.

== 15th–20th centuries ==
The cover of Branteghem's 1537 visual gospel harmony, Antwerp

In the 15th and the 16th centuries some new approaches to harmony began to appear. For example, Jean Gerson produced a harmony in 1420 which gave priority to the Gospel of John. Cornelius Jansen also published his harmony in 1549, focusing on the four gospels and even referring to the Acts of the Apostles. On the other hand John Calvin's approach focused on the three synoptic Gospels, and excluded the Gospel of John.

By this time visual representations had also started appearing, for instance, the 15th-century artist Lieven de Witte produced a set of about 200 woodcut images that depicted the Life of Christ in terms of a "pictorial gospel harmony" which then appeared in Willem van Branteghem's harmony published in Antwerp in 1537. The importance of imagery is reflected in the title of Branteghem's well known work: The Life of Jesus Christ Skillfully Portrayed in Elegant Pictures Drawn from the Narratives of the Four Evangelists.

The 16th century witnessed a major increase in the introduction of gospel harmonies. In this period the parallel column structure became widespread, partly in response to the rise of biblical criticism. This new format was used to emphasize the trustworthiness of the gospels. It is not clear who produced the first parallel harmony, but Gerardus Mercator's 1569 system is a well-known example. In terms of content and quality, Johann Jakob Griesbach's 1776 synopsis was a notable case.

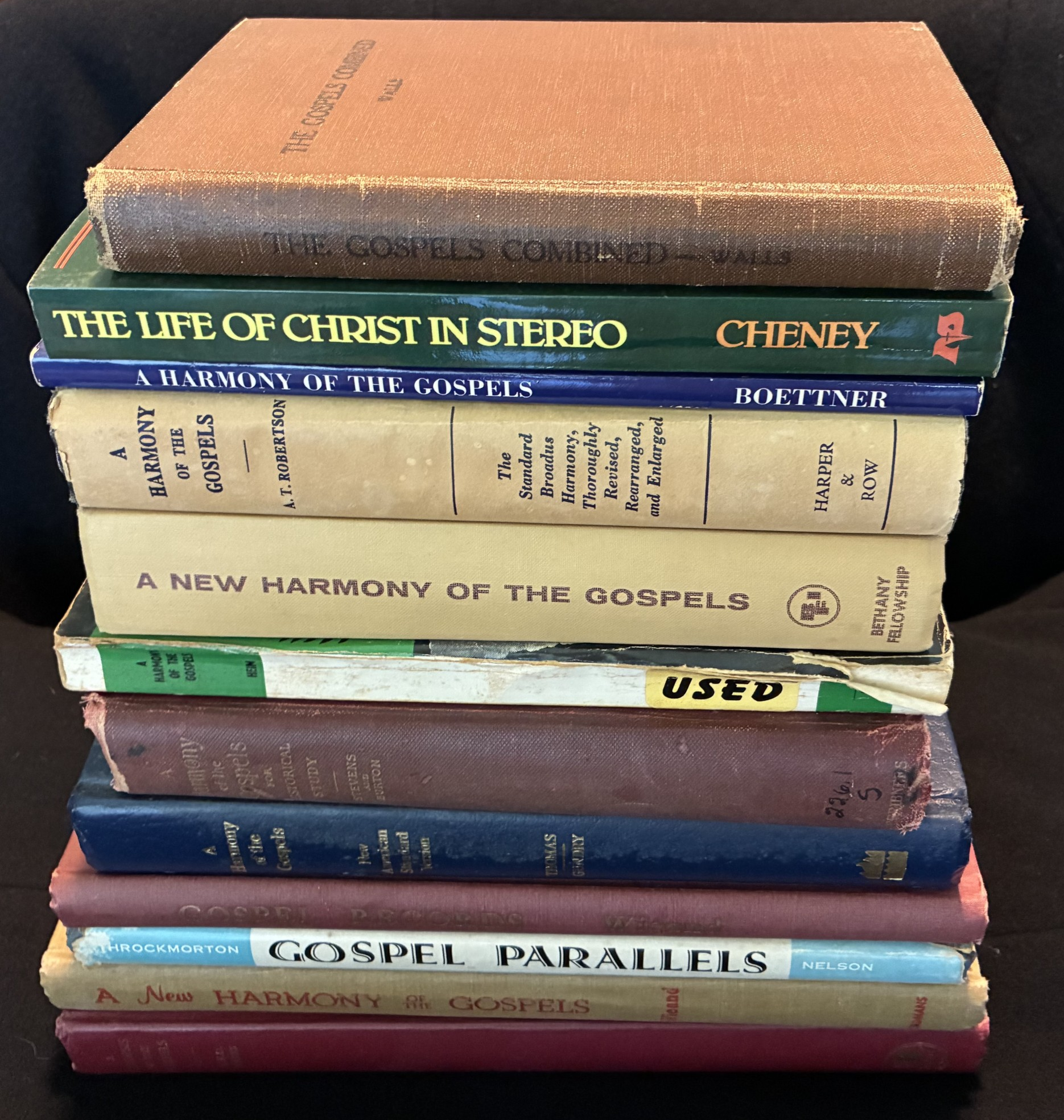
Twelve Gospel harmonies

At the same time, the rise of modern biblical criticism was instrumental in the decline of the traditional apologetic gospel harmony. The Enlightenment writer, Gotthold Ephraim Lessing, observed:

Oh that most excellent Harmony, which can only reconcile two contradictory reports, both stemming from the evangelists, by inventing a third report, not a syllable of which is to be found in any individual evangelist!

W. G. Rushbrooke's 1880 Synopticon is at times considered a turning point in the history of the synopsis, as it was based on Marcan priority, i.e. the assumption that the Gospel of Mark was the first to be written. Thirteen years later, John Albert Broadus used historical accounts to assign priorities in his harmony, while previous approaches had used feasts as the major milestones for dividing the life of Christ.

Towards the end of the 19th century, after extensive travels and study in the Middle East, James Tissot produced a set of 350 watercolors which depicted the life of Christ as a visual gospel harmony. Tissot synthesized the four gospels into a singular narrative with five chapters: "the Holy Childhood, the Ministry, Holy Week, the Passion, and the Resurrection". He also made portraits of each of the Four Evangelists to honor them.

In the 20th century, the Synopsis of the Four Gospels by Kurt Aland came to be seen by some as "perhaps the standard for an in-depth study of the Gospels." A key feature of Aland's work is the incorporation of the full text of the Gospel of John. Bernard Orchard's synopsis (which has the same title) was of note in that it took the unusual approach of abandoning Marcan priority and assuming the synoptic gospels were written with Matthean priority and Markan posteriority.

== 21st-century ==
An attempt has been made to create gospel concordance by adjusting only the modern chapter-and-verse boundaries (rather than rewriting the underlying text), as chapter and verse numbering is a later addition to the gospels.

== Parallel harmony ==
The following table is an example of a parallel harmony. The order of events, especially during the ministry period, has been the subject of speculation and scholarly debate. The order below is based on those of Anglican William Newcome in 1778 and Baptists Steven L. Cox and Kendell H. Easley in 2006.

Seq	Event	Type	Matthew	Mark	Luke	John
1	Pre-existence of Christ	miscellaneous				1:1–18
2	Genealogy of Jesus	nativity	1:1–17		3:23–38	
3	Birth of John the Baptist	nativity			1:5–25	
4	Annunciation	nativity			1:26–38	
5	Visitation of Mary	nativity			1:39–56	
6	Birth of Jesus	nativity	1:18–25		2:1–7	
7	Annunciation to the shepherds	nativity			2:8–15	
8	Adoration of the shepherds	nativity			2:16–20	
9	Circumcision of Jesus	nativity			2:21	
10	Infant Jesus at the Temple	nativity			2:22–38	
11	Star of Bethlehem	nativity	2:1–2			
12	Visit of the Magi	nativity	2:1–12			
13	Flight into Egypt	nativity	2:13–15			
14	Massacre of the Innocents	nativity	2:16–18			
15	Herod the Great's death	miscellaneous	2:19–20			
16	Return of the family of Jesus to Nazareth	youth	2:21–23		2:39	
17	Finding Jesus in the Temple	youth			2:41–51	
18	Ministry of John the Baptist	miscellaneous	3:1–12	1:1–8	3:1–20	1:19–34
19	Baptism of Jesus	miscellaneous	3:13–17	1:9–11	3:21–22	1:29–34
20	Temptation of Jesus	miscellaneous	4:1–11	1:12–13	4:1–13	
21	Marriage at Cana	miracle				2:1–11
22	Temple Cleansing	ministry				2:13–25
23	Jesus & Nicodemus	ministry				3:1–21
24	Return of Jesus to Galilee	ministry	4:12–17	1:14–15	4:14–15	4:1–3
25	Exorcism at the Synagogue in Capernaum	miracle		1:21–28	4:31–37	
26	The Growing Seed	parable		4:26–29		
27	Rejection of Jesus	ministry	13:53–58	6:1–6	4:16–30	
28	First disciples of Jesus	ministry	4:18–22	1:16–20	5:1–11	1:35–51
29	Miraculous draught of fishes	miracle			5:1–11	
30	Beatitudes	sermon	5:2–12		6:20–23	
31	Young Man from Nain	miracle			7:11–17	
32	The Two Debtors	parable			7:41–43	
33	The Lamp under a Bushel	parable	5:14–15	4:21–25	8:16–18	
34	Expounding of the Law	sermon	5:17–48		6:29–42	
35	Seventy Disciples	ministry			10:1–24	
36	Discourse on ostentation	sermon	6:1–18			
37	Parable of the Good Samaritan	parable			10:30–37	
38	Jesus at the home of Martha and Mary	ministry			10:38–42	
39	The Lord's Prayer	ministry	6:9–13		11:2–4	
40	The Friend at Night	parable			11:5–8	
41	The Rich Fool	parable			12:16–21	
42	Samaritan Woman at the Well	ministry				4:4–26
43	The Birds of the Air	ministry	6:25–34		12:22–34	
44	Discourse on judging	sermon	7:1–5		6:41–42	
45	Discourse on holiness	sermon	7:13–27			
46	The Test of a Good Person	sermon	7:15–20		6:43–45	
47	The Wise and the Foolish Builders	parable	7:24–27		6:46–49	
48	Cleansing a leper	miracle	8:1–4	1:40–45	5:12–16	
49	The Centurion's Servant	miracle	8:5–13		7:1–10	
50	Healing the royal official's son	miracle				4:46–54
51	Healing the mother of Peter's wife	miracle	8:14–17	1:29–31	4:38–41	
52	Exorcising at sunset	miracle	8:16–17	1:32–34	4:40–41	
53	Calming the storm	miracle	8:23–27	4:35–41	8:22–25	
54	Gerasenes demonic	miracle	8:28–34	5:1–20	8:26–39	
55	Paralytic at Capernaum	miracle	9:1–8	2:1–12	5:17–26	
56	Calling of Matthew	ministry	9:9	2:13–14	5:27–28	
57	New Wine into Old Wineskins	parable	9:17	2:22	5:37–39	
58	Daughter of Jairus	miracle	9:18–26	5:21–43	8:40–56	
59	The Bleeding Woman	miracle	9:20–22	5:24–34	8:43–48	
60	Two Blind Men at Galilee	miracle	9:27–31			
61	Exorcising a mute	miracle	9:32–34			
62	Commissioning the twelve Apostles	ministry	10:1–4 · 10:5–42	6:7–13	9:1–6	
63	Not peace, but a sword	ministry	10:34–36		12:49–53	
64	Messengers from John the Baptist	ministry	11:2–6		7:18–23	
65	Paralytic at Bethesda	miracle				5:1–18
66	Lord of the Sabbath	ministry	12:1–8	2:23–28	6:1–5	
67	Man with withered Hand	miracle	12:9–13	3:1–6	6:6–11	
68	Exorcising the blind and mute man	miracle	12:22–28	3:20–30	11:14–23	
69	Parable of the strong man	parable	12:29	3:27	11:21–22	
70	Eternal sin	ministry	12:30–32	3:28–29	12:8–10	
71	Jesus' True Relatives	ministry	12:46–50	3:31–35	8:19–21	
72	Parable of the Sower	parable	13:3–9	4:3–9	8:5–8	
73	The Tares	parable	13:24–30			
74	The Barren Fig Tree	parable			13:6–9	
75	An Infirm Woman	miracle			13:10–17	
76	Parable of the Mustard Seed	parable	13:31–32	4:30–32	13:18–19	
77	The Leaven	parable	13:33		13:20–21	
78	Parable of the Pearl	parable	13:45–46			
79	Drawing in the Net	parable	13:47–50			
80	The Hidden Treasure	parable	13:44			
81	Beheading of John the Baptist	ministry	14:6–12	6:21–29	9:7–9	
82	Feeding the 5000	miracle	14:13–21	6:31–44	9:10–17	6:5–15
83	Jesus' walk on water	miracle	14:22–33	6:45–52		6:16–21
84	Healing in Gennesaret	miracle	14:34–36	6:53–56		
85	Discourse on Defilement	sermon	15:1–11	7:1–23		
86	Canaanite woman's daughter	miracle	15:21–28	7:24–30		
87	Healing the deaf mute of Decapolis	miracle		7:31–37		
88	Feeding the 4000	miracle	15:32–39	8:1–9		
89	Blind Man of Bethsaida	miracle		8:22–26		
90	Confession of Peter	ministry	16:13–20	8:27–30	9:18–21	
91	Transfiguration of Jesus	miracle	17:1–13	9:2–13	9:28–36	
92	Boy possessed by a demon	miracle	17:14–21	9:14–29	9:37–49	
93	Coin in the fish's mouth	miracle	17:24–27			
94	Bread of Life Discourse	sermon				6:22–59
95	The Little Children	ministry	18:1–6	9:33–37	9:46–48	
96	Man with dropsy	miracle			14:1–6	
97	Counting the Cost	parable			14:25–33	
98	The Lost Sheep	parable	18:10–14		15:4–6	
99	The Unforgiving Servant	parable	18:23–35			
100	The Lost Coin	parable			15:8–9	
101	Parable of the Prodigal Son	parable			15:11–32	
102	The Unjust Steward	parable			16:1–13	
103	Rich man and Lazarus	parable			16:19–31	
104	The Master and Servant	parable			17:7–10	
105	Cleansing ten lepers	miracle			17:11–19	
106	The Unjust Judge	parable			18:1–8	
107	Pharisee and the Tax Collector	parable			18:9–14	
108	Divorce and celibacy	ministry	19:1–12	10:1–12	16:18	
109	Jesus and the rich young man	ministry	19:16–30	10:17–31	18:18–30	
110	Jesus and the woman taken in adultery	ministry				8:2–11
111	The Workers in the Vineyard	parable	20:1–16			
112	Jesus predicts his death	ministry	20:17–19	8:31; 9:31; 10:32–34	18:31–34	12:23–33
113	The Blind at Birth	miracle				9:1–12
114	Son of man came to serve	ministry	20:20–28	10:35–45	22:24–27	
115	The Good Shepherd	ministry				10:1–21
116	Blind near Jericho	miracle	20:29–34	10:46–52	18:35–43	
117	Raising of Lazarus	miracle				11:1–44
118	Jesus and Zacchaeus	ministry			19:1–10	
119	Palm Sunday	ministry	21:1–11	11:1–11	19:29–44	12:12–19
120	Temple Cleansing	ministry	21:12–13	11:15–18	19:45–48	
121	Cursing the fig tree	miracle	21:18–22	11:12–14		
122	Authority of Jesus Questioned	ministry	21:23–27	11:27–33	20:1–8	
123	The Two Sons	parable	21:28–32			
124	The Wicked Husbandmen	parable	21:33–41	12:1–9	20:9–16	
125	The Great Banquet	parable	22:1–14		14:16–24	
126	Render unto Caesar...	ministry	22:15–22	12:13–17	20:20–26	
127	Woes of the Pharisees	ministry	23:1–39	12:35–37	20:45–47	
128	Widow's mite	sermon		12:41–44	21:1–4	
129	Second Coming Prophecy	ministry	24:1–31	13:1–27	21:5–36	
130	The Budding Fig Tree	parable	24:32–35	13:28–31	21:29–33	
131	The Faithful Servant	parable	24:42–51	13:34–37	12:35–48	
132	The Ten Virgins	parable	25:1–13			
133	The Talents or Minas	parable	25:14–30		19:12–27	
134	The Sheep and the Goats	parable	25:31–46			
135	Anointing of Jesus at Bethany	ministry	26:6–13	14:3–9		12:1–8
136	Anointing in the house of Simon the Pharisee	ministry			7:36–39	
137	Bargain of Judas	miscellaneous	26:14–16	14:10–11	22:1–6	
138	The Grain of Wheat	ministry				12:24–26
139	Last Supper	ministry	26:17–30	14:22–25	22:14–20	13:1–30
140	Promising a Paraclete	ministry				16:5–15
141	Prediction of Peter's denial	passion	26:31–35	14:27–31	22:31–34	13:36–38
142	Gethsemane	miscellaneous	26:36–46	14:32–42	22:39–46	
143	The kiss of Judas	passion	26:47–49	14:43–45	22:47–48	18:2–9
144	Healing the ear of a servant	miracle			22:49–51	
145	Arrest of Jesus	passion	26:50–56	14:46–49	22:52–54	18:10–12
146	Naked fugitive	passion		14:51–52		
147	Sanhedrin Trial of Jesus	passion	26:57–68	14:53–65	22:63–71	18:12–24
148	Peter denies Jesus	passion	26:69–75	14:66–72	22:54–62	18:15–27
149	Jesus before Pilate	passion	27:11–26	15:1–15	23:1–5, 13–25	18:28–19:16
150	Jesus before Herod Antipas	passion			23:6–12	
151	Blood curse	passion	27:24–25			
152	Death of Judas Iscariot	passion	27:3–10		1:18–19	
153	Carrying the cross	passion	27:27–33	15:20–22	23:26–32	19:16–17
154	Crucifixion of Jesus	passion	27:34–61	15:23–47	23:33–54	19:18–38
155	The guard at the tomb	passion	27:62–66			
156	Myrrhbearers/Mary Magdalene at the Tomb	resurrection appearance	28:1	16:1	24:1	20:1
157	Empty tomb	resurrection appearance	28:2–8	16:2–8	24:2–12	20:1–13
158	Resurrection of Jesus	resurrection appearance	28:9–10	16:9–11	24:1–8	20:14–16
159	Noli me tangere	resurrection appearance				20:17
160	Road to Emmaus appearance	resurrection appearance			24:13–32	
161	Resurrected Jesus appears to Apostles	resurrection appearance		16:14	24:36–43	20:19–20
162	Great Commission	resurrection appearance	28:16–20	16:14–18	24:44–49	20:21–23
163	Doubting Thomas	resurrection appearance				20:24–29
164	Catch of 153 fish	miracle				21:1–24
165	Ascension of Jesus	resurrection appearance		16:19	24:50–53	
166	Dispersion of the Apostles	miscellaneous	28:19–20	16:20		

== See also ==
- Biblical inerrancy
- Chronology of the Bible
- Jefferson Bible, created by Thomas Jefferson
- Little Gidding harmonies
- Ministry of Jesus
- Palmarian Bible
- The Gospel in Brief, created by Leo Tolstoy
