= Marla Alupoaicei =

American Christian author and speaker

- Born: 1974 (age 51–52) Dixon, Illinois, U.S.
- Occupation: Writer
- Education: Purdue University (BA); Dallas Theological Seminary (MTh)
- Genre: Christianity non-fiction fiction poetry social justice

Website
- www.marriageleap.com

Marla (born 1974) is an American Christian author and speaker. She has partnered with several ministries, including Buckner Orphan Care International, to support social justice and particularly ministry to orphans in Romania, Mexico and other nations.

Marla received a B.A. in English and Communications from Purdue University and a Master of Theology degree from Dallas Theological Seminary. She has worked with a number of authors, pastors and ministry leaders, and speaks at schools, churches, and conferences. She also serves as a professional editor and "book doctor" to help prepare others' books for publication.

An author of nonfiction, fiction and poetry, Marla has won several poetry competitions, including the Dorothy Sargent Rosenberg Poetry Prize in 2006, worth $10,000. Alupoaicei was a winner of the Writer's Digest 76th Annual Writing Competition for Nonrhyming Poetry. Her poem "Constellation" won first prize in the 2009 Writer's Digest Writing Competition.

== Background ==
Marla and her ex-husband met while on a mission trip in 1998 and married in 2002. They divorced in 2019. She served as the Director of Leap of Faith Ministries, a marriage support ministry in Frisco, Texas. Her marriage story has been featured in several national newspapers and magazines. She founded an intercultural marriage ministry called Leap of Faith Ministries to minister to other cross-cultural couples.

For five years, Marla worked as a writer and editor for Insight for Living, Chuck Swindoll's international Bible-teaching ministry in Plano, Texas. She then worked as a writer and editor for East-West Ministries, a church planting and missions organization in Addison, Texas. Articles written by Marla have been published by Kindred Spirit, a publication of Dallas Theological Seminary.

== Bibliography ==
Marla has written, co-authored or edited over 30 books and Bible study guides, many through Insight for Living. Her books include Generation Hex: Understanding the Subtle Dangers of Wicca (Harvest House Publishers, August 2008) (with Dillon Burroughs); and Your Intercultural Marriage: A Guide to a Healthy, Happy Relationship (Moody Publishers, July 2009).
