= Jesus' true relatives =

Saying of Jesus of Nazareth concerning his true relatives

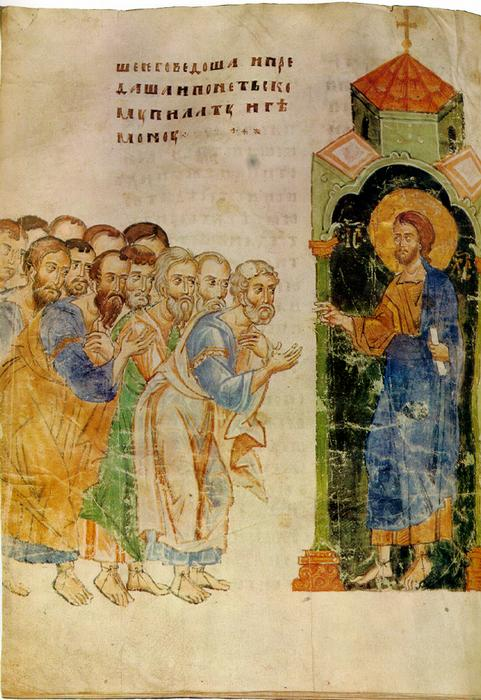
Jesus and his Apostles, from the Russian Siysky Gospel, 1340.

The saying of Jesus concerning his true relatives is found in the Canonical gospels Mark, Matthew, and Luke. It shows that, for Jesus, whoever does the will of God is like his family.

== In the Bible ==
From Mark 3:31–35:

There came then his brethren and his mother, and, standing without, sent unto him, calling him.

And the multitude sat about him, and they said unto him, Behold, thy mother and thy brethren without seek for thee.

And he answered them, saying, Who is my mother, or my brethren?

And he looked round about on them which sat about him, and said, Behold my mother and my brethren!

For whosoever shall do the will of God, the same is my brother, and my sister, and mother.

From Matthew 12:46–50:

While he yet talked to the people, behold, his mother and his brethren stood without, desiring to speak with him.

Then one said unto him, Behold, thy mother and thy brethren stand without, desiring to speak with thee.

But he answered and said unto him that told him, Who is my mother? and who are my brethren?

And he stretched forth his hand toward his disciples, and said, Behold my mother and my brethren!

For whosoever shall do the will of my Father which is in heaven, the same is my brother, and sister, and mother.

From Luke 8:19–21

Then came to him his mother and his brethren, and could not come at him for the press.

And it was told him by certain which said, Thy mother and thy brethren stand without, desiring to see thee.

And he answered and said unto them, My mother and my brethren are these which hear the word of God, and do it.

== Apocryphal version ==
A re-organized version also appears in the Gospel of Thomas (Patterson-Meyer Translation):

^{99} The disciples said to him, "Your brothers and your mother are standing outside." He said to them, "Those here who do what my Father wants are my brothers and my mother. They are the ones who will enter my Father's kingdom."

^{100} They showed Jesus a gold coin and said to him, "The Roman emperor's people demand taxes from us." He said to them, "Give the emperor what belongs to the emperor, give God what belongs to God, and give me what is mine."

^{101} "Whoever does not hate [father] and mother as I do cannot be my [disciple], and whoever does [not] love [father and] mother as I do cannot be my [disciple]. For my mother [...], but my true[mother] gave me life."

Verse 100 (Caesar's Coin) is similar to Mark 12:13-17 and Luke 20.22-26. Verse 101 (Love Jesus/God more than your family) is similar to Matthew 10:37 and Luke 14:26–33.

Jesus' true relatives Life of Jesus: Ministry
| Preceded by Parable of the Strong Man; Parables of Jesus | New Testament; Events | Succeeded by Parable of the Sower; Parables of Jesus |
