= Lieven de Witte =

Lieven de Witte (ca. 1503 - after 1578, Ghent), known also as Livieno da Anversa, was a painter and architect, who practised at Ghent between 1518 and 1578. He devoted himself to buildings and other perspective subjects, but also produced historical pictures. The windows of the cathedral of St. Bavon in Ghent were painted from his designs, and he is said to have worked at the miniatures in the Grimani Breviary now in the library of St. Mark at Venice.

He produced a set of 200 woodcut images that depicted the Life of Christ in terms of a Gospel harmony.
