= Susan Meissner =

American author

Susan Meissner (born 1961) is an American author, columnist, and the former editor of a weekly newspaper.

Meissner was born and raised in San Diego, California, where she attended Point Loma Nazarene University. She lived in England, Germany, and Minnesota as an adult. In Minnesota, Meissner was the editor of a weekly newspaper. In 2007, Meissner moved back to southern California. Meissner is married and has four children.

Meissner's novels have been reviewed by publications including Kirkus Reviews, Publishers Weekly, Library Journal, Booklist, and USA Today. She has won several awards for her novels, in addition to being a nominee for the Christy Award and a finalist for the RITA Award. Meissner has written both general market and Christian literature.

== Selected bibliography ==
- A Window to the World (Harvest House, 2005)
- The Remedy for Regret (Harvest House, 2005)
- A Seahorse in the Thames (Harvest House, 2006)
- Blue Heart Blessed (Harvest House, 2008)
- Why the Sky is Blue(Harvest House, 2004)
- The Shape of Mercy (WaterBrook, 2008)
- White Picket Fences (WaterBrook, 2009)
- Lady in Waiting (WaterBrook, 2010)
- A Sound Among the Trees (WaterBrook, 2011)
- The Girl in the Glass (WaterBrook, 2012)
- A Fall of Marigolds (New American Library, 2014)
- The Amish Clockmaker (Harvest House, 2015)
- Secrets of a Charmed Life (Berkley Books, 2015)
- Stars Over Sunset Boulevard (New American Library, 2016)
- A Bridge Across the Ocean (Berkley Books, 2017)
- As Bright as Heaven (Berkley Books, 2018)
- The Last Year of the War (Berkley Books, 2019)
- The Nature of Fragile Things (2021)
- When We Had Wings (with Ariel Lawhon and Kristina McMorris) (2022)
- Only the Beautiful (2023)
- A Map to Paradise (2025)
