= Linda Chaikin =

American novelist

Linda Chaikin (born 1943) is a Christian fiction author with a focus on historical fiction. She sometimes publishes using the name L. L. Chaikin.

Chaikin was the youngest of 10 children and her father died shortly after she was born. She wrote her first full-length novel with pen and paper at the age of 14 - this novel was later rewritten as Wednesday's Child, part of the Day to Remember series.

She met her husband, Steve, in a Bible study, and they were married 6 months later. They both went to Multnomah School of the Bible, now known as Multnomah Bible College and Biblical Seminary in Portland, Oregon.

== Books by Linda Chaikin ==
=== Heart of India series ===
Published by Bethany House.

1. Silk, 1993
2. Under Eastern Stars, 1993
3. Kingscote, 1994

=== Royal Pavilions series ===
Published by Thomas Nelson.

1. Swords and Scimitars, 1993
2. Golden Palaces, 1996
3. Behind the Veil, 1998

=== Great Northwest series ===
Published by Bethany House.

1. Empire Builders, 1994
2. Winds of Allegiance, 1996

=== Buccaneers series ===
Published by Moody Publishers.

1. Port Royal, 1995
2. The Pirate and His Lady, 1997
3. Jamaican Sunset, 1997

=== Egypt series ===
Published by Multnomah Publishers.

1. Arabian Winds, 1997
2. Lions of the Desert, 1997
3. Valiant Hearts, 1998

=== Trade Winds series ===
Published by Harvest House.

1. Captive Heart, 1998
2. Silver Dreams, 1998
3. Island Bride, 1999

=== Day to Remember series ===
Published by Harvest House.

1. Monday's Child, 1999
2. Tuesday's Child, 2000
3. Wednesday's Child, 2000
4. Thursday's Child, 2001
5. Friday's Child, 2001
6. Saturday's Child, 2003

=== East of the Sun series ===
Published by WaterBrook press, a division of Random House.

1. Tomorrow's Treasure, 2003
2. Yesterday's Promise, 2004
3. Today's Embrace, 2005

=== Desert Rose/Desert Star ===
Published by Harvest House.

1. Desert Rose, 2003
2. Desert Star, 2004

=== Silk House series ===
Published by Zondervan.

1. Daughter of Silk, 2006
2. Written On Silk, 2007
3. Threads of Silk, 2008

=== Dawn of Hawaii series ===
Published by Moody Publishers.

1. The Spoils of Eden, 2010
2. Hawaiian Crosswinds, 2011
3. Jewel of the Pacific, 2013

=== Standalone books ===
- Recovery of the Lost Sword, 1990. Same story as The Everlasting Flame.
- Nevada Jade, 1992. This story was later expanded in Desert Rose.
- The Everlasting Flame: A Tale of Undying Love for Each Other And God's World in a Dangerous Time, 1995
- Endangered, 1997 - part of the Portraits series.
- For Whom the Stars Shine, 1999. Listed as book one, but later used as a prequel to the Dawn of Hawaii series.
- The Midwife of St. Petersburg, 2007. Published by WaterBrook Press, a division of Random House.
