= Jim George (author) =

American writer

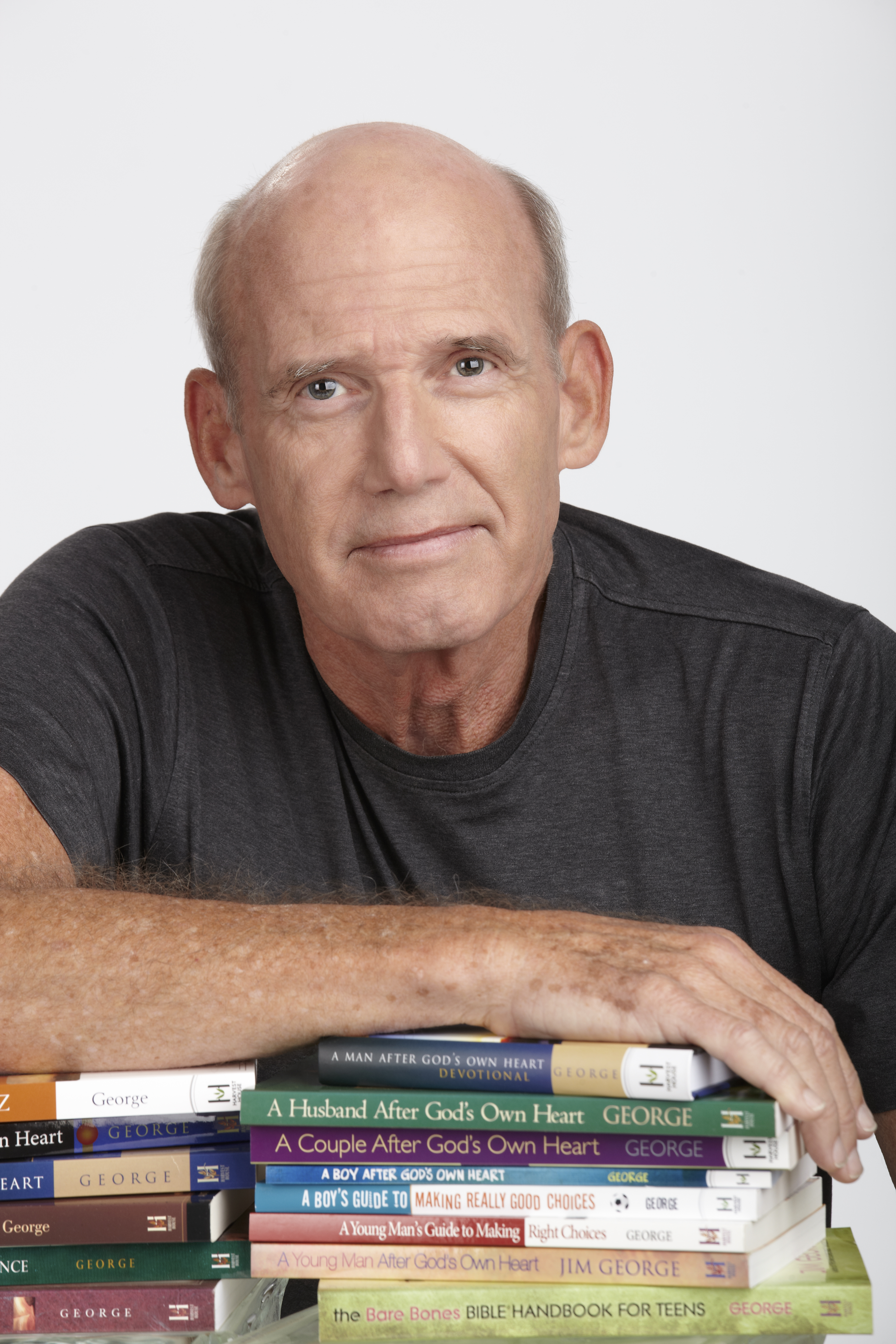
- Born: James Monroe George; May 14, 1943 (age 83); Columbus, Kansas
- Died: July 18, 2023
- Education: University of Oklahoma (B.S.); Talbot School of Theology (M.Div., M.Th.)
- Occupations: Author, motivational speaker, pharmacist
- Spouse: Elizabeth (née White) (1965–2023; his death)
- Children: 2
- Writing career
- Period: 2002–present
- Genre: Religion
- Notable works: A Man After God's Own Heart; Bare Bones Bible Handbook; A Husband After God's Own Heart; A Leader After God's Own Heart; A Young Man After God's Own Heart; God's Wisdom for Little Boys
- Website: www.jimgeorge.com

Jim George was an American author. He has co-authored several works with his wife Elizabeth George.

== Early life ==
George graduated from The University of Oklahoma in 1966 with a Bachelor of Pharmacy. He earned his Master of Divinity from Talbot School of Theology in the late 1970s. He received his Master of Theology from Talbot School of Theology in the early 1980s.

== Publications ==
George released his first book, A Man After God's Own Heart, in 2002. For several of his publications, he later wrote study guides and devotionals.

=== Works ===
| Year | Title | Notes |
|---|---|---|
| 2002 | God's Wisdom for Little Boys: Character-Building Fun from Proverbs | |
| 2002 | A Man After God's Own Heart | |
| 2003 | God's Man of Influence | |
| 2004 | A Husband After God's Own Heart | |
| 2004 | Powerful Promises for Every Couple: Putting God's Promises to Work in Your Life | |
| 2004 | God Loves His Precious Children: Safe in the Arms of the Good Shepherd | |
| 2005 | A Young Man After God's Own Heart: Turn Your Life into an Extreme Adventure | |
| 2005 | The Remarkable Prayers of the Bible: Transforming Power for Your Life Today | |
| 2006 | The Bare Bones Bible Handbook: 10 Minutes to Understanding Each Book of the Bible | |
| 2006 | What God Wants to Do for You: 24 Amazing Ways to Experience His Power | |
| 2007 | A Little Boy After God's Own Heart | |
| 2007 | The Remarkable Prayers of the Bible Growth and Study Guide: Transforming Power for Your Life Today | |
| 2008 | 10 Minutes to Knowing the Men and Women of the Bible (The Bare Bones Bible Series) | |
| 2008 | The Bare Bones Bible Handbook for Teens: Getting to Know Every Book in the Bible | |
| 2009 | The Bare Bones Bible Facts: A Quick Reference to the People, Places, and Things of the Bible | |
| 2010 | The Man Who Makes A Difference: 10 Keys to a Life of Impact | |
| 2011 | A Young Man's Guide to Making Right Choices: Your Life God's Way | |
| 2012 | A Leader After God's Own Heart: 15 Ways to Lead with Strength | |
| 2012 | A Boy After God's Own Heart: Your Awesome Adventure with Jesus | |
| 2013 | A Couple After God's Own Heart: Building a Lasting, Loving Marriage Together | |
| 2013 | A Boy's Guide to Making Really Good Choices | 2014 Christian Retailing's Best Finalist in Children's Nonfiction Category |
| 2013 | Know Your Bible from A to Z: A Quick Handbook to the People, Places, and Things | |
| 2013 | One-Minute Insights for Men | |
| 2014 | A Dad After God's Own Heart | |
| 2014 | A Young Man's Guide To Discovering His Bible | |
| 2015 | A Boy's Guide to Discovering His Bible | |
| 2015 | A Man After God's Own Heart, Updated and Expanded | |
| 2015 | A Young Man After God's Own Heart, Updated and revised | |

== Personal life ==
In 1965, Jim married Elizabeth White in Bartlesville, Oklahoma. The couple met while attending The University of Oklahoma. Elizabeth is an author, speaker, and woman's Bible teacher. They have two children.
