= Margaret Feinberg =

American writer

Margaret Feinberg is an author and public speaker based in Salt Lake City, Utah. She creates books, Bible studies, and video curriculum aimed at people of faith.

== Biography ==
Feinberg's father was a Jewish convert to Christianity. She spent the first eight years of her life living in Cocoa Beach, Florida, before moving to Maggie Valley, North Carolina. Her family later moved to Steamboat Springs, Colorado where she spent the rest of her childhood and adolescence. Feinberg holds a B.A. in religion from Wake Forest University. She describes how she originally desired to attend Georgetown University. She only applied to small number of schools praying that she would only be accepted by the school that God desired for her to attend. She attributes her getting accepted at Wake Forest to God's "providence and wisdom". A regular speaker at churches and conferences such as Catalyst, Thrive, and Extraordinary Women, Margaret Feinberg has received numerous accolades. In 2005 she was named one of the '30 Voices' who will help lead the church in the next decade by Charisma magazine. In 2008 she was listed as one of the '40 Under 40' who will shape Christian publishing by Christian Retailing. In 2012 she was named as one of the 50 women shaping the church and culture by Christianity Today. She has written more than fifty books and Bible studies including the critically acclaimed The Organic God (Zondervan), The Sacred Echo (Zondervan), Scouting the Divine (Zondervan), Wonderstruck (Worthy Publishing), Fight Back With Joy, Taste and See, and their corresponding DVD Bible studies. Margaret also hosts a podcast called The Joycast where she talks about what it looks like to be people of joy.

Feinberg and her books have been covered by media including: CNN, the Associated Press, Los Angeles Times, The Dallas Morning News, The Washington Post, Chicago Tribune, Denver Rocky Mountain News, Newsday, Houston Chronicle, Beliefnet.com, Salon.com, USAToday.com, MSNBC.com,Forbes.com, and many others. Feinberg currently lives in Utah, with her 6 ft 8 in (2.03 m) husband, Leif, and their dog, Zoom.

== Bibliography ==
- The God You Need to Know: Experience the Holy Spirit's Power and Presence Today, 2025, (Zondervan)
- James: What You Do Matters, 2023,(Zondervan)
- Revelation: Extravagant Hope, 2021,(Zondervan)
- God's Power in Me: 52 Declarations and Devotions for Kids, 2021,(Zondervan)
- More Power to You: Break Free From Fear and Take Your Life Back, 2020,(Zondervan)
- Taste and See: Discovering God Among Butchers, Bakers, and fresh Food Makers, 2019 (Zondervan)
- Taste and See 6 Session DVD Bible Study and workbook: Discovering God Among Butchers, Bakers, and fresh Food Makers, 2019 (Zondervan)
- Pocketful of Promises: A Prayer Journal Coloring Book, 2017,(Bethany Books)
- Flourish: 52 Week Devotional, 2016 (Worthy Publishing)
- Promises of Blessing: An Adult Coloring Book, 2016,(Bethany Books)
- Promises of Joy: An Adult Coloring Book, 2016,(Bethany Books)
- Live Fearless: An Adult Coloring Book, 2016,(Bethany Books)
- Live Free: An Adult Coloring Book, 2016,(Bethany Books)
- Fight Back with Joy 6 Session DVD Bible Study, 2015 (Lifeway)
- Fight Back with Joy: Celebrate More. Regret Less. Stare Down Your Greatest Fears, 2015 (Worthy Publishing)
- Live Loved: An Adult Coloring Book, 2015,(Bethany Books)
- Wonderstruck: Awaken to the Nearness of God 7 Session DVD Bible Study, 2012 (Lifeway)
- Wonderstruck: Awaken to the Nearness of God, 2012 (Worthy Publishing)
- Discovering Joy in Creativity, 2010 (Thomas Nelson)
- Imagine What God Can Do, 2010 (Thomas Nelson)
- Experiencing Peace, 2010 (Thomas Nelson)
- Over the Top, 2010 (Thomas Nelson)
- Scouting the Divine DVD Bible Study, 2010 (Lifeway)
- Scouting the Divine, 2009 (Zondervan)
- The Sacred Echo DVD Bible Study, 2009 (Bluefish)
- The Sacred Echo, 2008 (Zondervan)
- The Organic God DVD Bible Study, 2007 (Bluefish)
- The Organic God, 2007 (Zondervan)
- Friendships, 2009 (Thomas Nelson)
- Making the Most of Your Resources, 2009 (Thomas Nelson)
- A Grand New Day, 2009 (Thomas Nelson)
- Resting in Him, 2008 (Thomas Nelson)
- Being Yourself, 2008 (Thomas Nelson)
- Overcoming Fear, 2007 (Thomas Nelson)
- What the Heck Am I Going to Do With My Life?, 2006 (Tyndale)
- Twenty Things You Should Read, 2006 (Tyndale House)
- Redefining Life: My Relationships, 2006 (Th1nk Books)
- Redefining Life: For Women, 2006 (Th1nk Books)
- Everything Twentys, 2006 (Tyndale House)
- Five-Star Living on a Two-Star Budget, 2006 (Harvest House)
- Just Married: What Might Surprise You About the First Few Years, 2005 (Harvest House)
- Redefining Life: My Identity, 2005 (Th1nk Books)
- Redefining Life: My Purpose, 2005 (Th1nk Books)
- Revolve 2: The Complete New Testament, 2005 (Thomas Nelson)
- Simple Prayers of Hope: Stories to Touch Your Heart and Feed Your Soul, 2005 (Harvest House)
- How to Be a Grown-Up, 2005 (Thomas Nelson) co-authored with Leif Oines
- Twentysomething: Surviving and Thriving in the Real World, 2004 (W Publishing)
- Simple Acts of Friendship: Heartwarming Stories of One Friend Blessing Another, 2004 (Harvest House)
- Cheap Ways To…, 2003 (Relevant Books)
- Simple Acts of Faith: Heartwarming Stories of One Life Touching Another, 2003 (Harvest House)
- God Whispers: Learning to Hear His Voice, 2002 (Relevant Books)
- Enjoying God: Experiencing Intimacy With the Heavenly Father, 2001 (Relevant Books) co-authored with S.J. Hill
