= Spiros Zodhiates =

Greek theologian

- Born: March 13, 1922; British Cyprus
- Died: October 10, 2009 (aged 87); Chattanooga, Tennessee, U.S.
- Education: Shelton College; Luther Rice College & Seminary; American University in Cairo; New York University

Spiros Zodhiates (Greek: Σπύρος Ζωδιάτης; March 13, 1922 – October 10, 2009) was a Greek-American Bible scholar, author, and ministry innovator. He was best known for his work in developing AMG (Advancing the Ministries of the Gospel) International, a Christian missions and relief agency with operations in over 40 countries. He is also known for publishing The Hebrew-Greek KeyWord Study Bible, which indexes key terms in the English Bible with the words they were translated from in the original languages.

== Early life and education ==
Zodhiates was born of Greek parents on the island of Cyprus. After completing his Greek education, he attended the American University in Cairo, Egypt, received his Th.B. degree from the National Bible Institute (later Shelton College, which closed its doors in 1990) in New York City, and his M.A. from New York University. In 1978 he earned his Doctor of Theology degree from Luther Rice Seminary of Lithonia, GA. He was also the recipient of several honorary doctorates.

== Ministry and media ==
He came to the United States in 1946 at the invitation of the American Committee for the Evangelization of the Greeks (now AMG International), of which he became president in 1966. Under Zodhiates' leadership, AMG grew from a small ministry focusing on the land of Greece to a worldwide evangelistic and relief ministry. AMG, founded in 1943 in New York City and presently located in Chattanooga, Tennessee, provides a wide range of social services, including care for orphans and leprosy patients, and has an expanding evangelistic thrust of “Advertising the Message of the Gospel” through paid newspaper and magazine gospel messages in many lands and languages.

In 1951, Zodhiates’ passion for radio was born when he realized the power of media to get the message of Christianity to the masses. Using his Greek background and knowledge of the Greek language as a springboard, Zodhiates took to the airwaves, teaching the New Testament in light of the original Greek meaning of the words used. Zodhiates’ program, New Testament Light, began on one station in rural Pennsylvania, and in its heyday was heard across the United States and Canada. As his career progressed, Zodhiates became a recognized authority on the Greek New Testament. His Bible teaching carried from radio into other media as well. In 1975, he launched Pulpit Helps Magazine, a monthly publication designed to provide pastors with insights from the original languages of the Bible, tips on sermon construction, illustrative stories to enhance Bible teaching, and news from Christian missions around the world. Pulpit Helps still serves thousands of readers in the United States and other English-speaking countries. New Testament Light was developed into a television show during the 1980s and was broadcast on numerous stations through the mid-1990s.

== Later life and death ==
After suffering numerous health problems in the late 1990s, Zodhiates transitioned out of active work, though many of his commentary manuscripts are still being edited and published, and his radio and television recordings are being redistributed digitally. He died in Chattanooga on October 10, 2009.

== Books ==
In addition to The Hebrew-Greek KeyWord Study Bible, Zodhiates published over 200 books and booklets in English, as well as 82 in Greek, many of which are in-depth word-by-word commentaries on the books of the New Testament. He started a book house, AMG Publishers, which has since grown into a significant producer of Christian books, to publish much of his material. He was also responsible for introducing the Modern Greek pronunciation of Classical and Koine Greek into U.S. colleges and universities through A Guide to Modern Greek Pronunciation and his tape recordings of the entire Koine New Testament (Nestle's text) in Modern Greek pronunciation. He recorded with Modern Greek pronunciation special courses on New Testament Greek for those who wish to learn it on their own or in classrooms, using texts such as J. Gresham Machen's New Testament Greek for Beginners, Summers', Davis', and Hadjiantoniou's grammars.
