= Bob Welch (author) =

American author (born 1954)

- Born: 1954 (age 71–72); Corvallis, Oregon, U.S.
- Education: University of Oregon
- Occupation: Author
- Website: www.bobwelchwriter.com

Bob Welch (born c. 1954) is an American author, speaker, teacher and newspaper columnist from Oregon. He writes a column for The Register-Guard, and is an adjunct professor at the University of Oregon. He has been honored multiple times by the National Society of Newspaper Columnists, and won many awards, including The Seattle Times C.B. Blethen Award for Distinguished Feature Writing.

== Career ==
Welch worked at The Register-Guard full-time from 1989 to 2013. As a columnist at The Register-Guard in Eugene, Oregon, Welch was twice honored by the National Society of Newspaper Columnists for “best column” and is a two-time winner of the “best writing” category in the Oregon Newspaper Publishers Association’s contest. Other honors include the Seattle Times C.B. Blethen Memorial Award for Distinguished Feature Writing.

== Personal life ==
Welch grew up in Corvallis, Oregon, graduating from Corvallis High School. After high school, Welch studied at University of Oregon and graduated in 1976.

Welch lives in Eugene, Oregon with his wife Sally.

== Published works ==
Among his books are:

- Cross Purposes: One believer's struggle to reconcile the peace of Christ with the rage of the Far Right. A Memoir (Ragamuffin books, 2021)
- 52 Little Lessons from a Christmas Carol (Thomas Nelson, 2015)
- 52 Little Lessons from Les Miserables (Thomas Nelson, 2014)
- The Keyboard Kitten: Gets Oregonized (penwax design, 2014)
- The Keyboard Kitten: An Oregon Children's Story (penwax design, 2013)
- My Seasons: A Literary Celebration of Sports and Life (AO Creative, 2006)
- My Oregon (AO Creative), a compilation of columns he wrote between 1999 and 2005
- American Nightingale: The Story of Francis Slanger, Forgotten Heroine of Normandy (Atria, 2001)
- Where Roots Grow Deep: Stories of Family, Love, and Legacy (Harvest House Publishers, 1999)
- A Father for All Seasons (Harvest House Publishers, 1998)
