= Harvest House =

American Christian publishing company

- Founded: 1974
- Founder: Bob Hawkins, Sr.
- Country of origin: United States
- Headquarters location: Eugene, Oregon
- Distribution: self-distributed (US); Foundation Distributing (Canada); Koorong, Word Australia (Australia); Christian Art Distributors (South Africa); CLC International, Inter-Varsity Press (UK); Soul Distributors (New Zealand)
- Key people: Bob Hawkins, Jr., President
- Publication types: Books
- Official website: harvesthousepublishers.com

Harvest House Publishers is a Christian publishing company founded in 1974 in Irvine, California, United States, and is now located in Eugene, Oregon. It publishes Christian fiction and non-fiction books, coming out with over 160 new books a year.

== Notable authors published by Harvest House ==
- Richard Abanes
- John Ankerberg
- Carolyn Arends
- Kay Arthur
- Dillon Burroughs
- Linda Chaikin
- Margaret Feinberg
- Elizabeth George
- Jack W. Hayford
- Ed Hindson
- Greg Laurie
- Susan Meissner
- Don Miller
- Johnnie Moore, Jr.
- Gilbert Morris
- Henry M. Morris father of the creation science movement
- Stormie Omartian
- Ron Rhodes
- Lauren Stratford
- Bob Welch
- Lori Wick
- Jennifer Rothschild

== See also ==
- List of companies based in Oregon
