= Manuel Sykes =

Manuel Sykes is an American pastor and civic leader from the state of Florida.

== Career ==
Sykes attended the Luther Rice Seminary & University, graduating in 1983 with a Bachelor of Arts degree. He then enrolled at Drew University, where he graduated with two Master's Degrees, one in Divinity and the other in Philosophy. He completed an internship in clinical pastoral education at the University Hospital in Jacksonville, Florida.

Sykes became the pastor at Bethel Community Baptist Church in St. Petersburg, Florida, in 1993. He also serves as the chaplain at the Veterans Affairs Medical Center and Bayfront Health St. Petersburg. In 2006, he was chosen to lead the St. Petersburg Theological Seminary. He was elected as the President of the St. Petersburg chapter of the National Association for the Advancement of Colored People in November 2010.

As a member of the Democratic Party, Sykes declared his intention to run for the United States House of Representatives in the 2014 elections, challenging incumbent Republican David Jolly in Florida's 13th congressional district. The Pinellas County Democratic Party chairman told him he would be "persona non grata" if he ran, and Sykes dropped out. Sykes is considering another campaign for 2016.

== Personal ==
Sykes has four children. He separated from his second wife in 2001. He had his fourth child with a member of a West Palm Beach congregation in 2006. He married Cleopatra Fowler in December 2006.

Sykes was diagnosed with prostate cancer in 2007.
