= Nestor Chamorro Pesantes =

Ecuadorian Christian evangelist

Néstor Chamorro Pesantes (July 15, 1936 – April 4, 2003) was a South American Christian evangelist. He graduated from Luther Rice University, Jacksonville, Florida. In 1962, he founded the Christian organization called Cruzada Estudiantil y Profesional de Colombia (CEPC) in Cali, Colombia, and he and his wife (Lolita Cruz de Chamorro) started a new life as missionaries. Today the organization has a presence in more than 80 countries.

As a speaker, he traveled in many countries preaching the gospel of Jesus Christ, using three models or interpretations: theotherapeutical, social, and doctrinal. He is the author of many books, including La Teoterapia y la Unción and Las fiestas solemnes.

== Early life ==
Néstor Mario Chamorro Pesantes was born in Nueva Loja, Ecuador, on July 15, 1936, and died in Bogotá on April 4, 2003. He was the oldest son of a young couple; his father was José María Ochoa and his mother was Mercedes Chamorro. He grew up under his maternal parent's care, who gave him the legal paternity. After receiving a degree in biology, he moved to Cali, Colombia, where he started work as a professor at the University of Valle.

== Marriage and children ==
Néstor Chamorro married Dolores Cruz on May 24, 1959, in Jamundí, Colombia. Dolores Cruz de Chamorro was born in a small town called Ancuya in the south of Colombia. She is a psychologist with a master's degree in ministry from Luther Rice Seminary in Jacksonville, Florida.

They had five children: Patricia Chamorro, Betty Chamorro, Jimmy Chamorro, Adriana Chamorro and Juan Pablo Chamorro. All of them are involved in the ministry founded by their parents, with Jimmy Chamorro as the worldwide director.

== Ministerial work ==
In 1959, while employed as a professor of biochemistry in the University of Valle, Chamorro experienced a life-changing religious event in which he supposedly encountered Jesus Christ. His life was so radically changed that his desire in the following four years was to dedicate his life and his wife's to know more about God and about how to communicate that experience to his colleagues and students in the university he worked for.

In early 1963 Néstor Chamorro traveled to Mexico to study evangelization strategies. When he returned to Colombia, he published the booklets Four Spiritual Laws and Four Keys of the Spiritual Life.

The same year Néstor Chamorro was trained in Chula Vista, Mexico, by Campus Crusade for Christ International and sent back to Colombia to start the campus ministry with the same vision and mission of Campus Crusade for Christ under the authority of its founder and president Bill Bright.

Néstor and his wife established the foundations of CCC ministry: prayer life, dedication to the holy scriptures and evangelization. This led to many students, professionals and families expressing the desire of having a more personal faith in Jesus Christ. At the end of 1963 there were over 100 students involved in the ministry.

At the end of 1979, CCC Colombia had established its ministry in many Colombian universities, the National University and the University of Valle del Cauca being its most important targets.

In 1980 Néstor Chamorro separated the Colombian ministry from Campus Crusade for Christ International and continued ministry under the name Cruzada Estudiantil y Profesional de Colombia. More than 200 full-time staff left the International Ministry of CCC with Chamorro. Until that time all the written materials and strategy were received from CCC.

The ministry has been known by several names since 1980, including Alfa Y Omega, AOISA, CENTI, C4, Teoterapia Integral, and CENFOL, as well as other names in different countries where it has operations.

== Books ==
- La Teoterapia de Dios Papá
- La Teoterapia y la Unción del Espíritu Santo
- Para tener vuelo de águila imperial
- Entre el Conflicto y la Salud
- Liberación de la Personalidad
- ¿Es un pecado amarse a sí mismo?
- Reconciliación
- La Teoterapia del Amor
- La Teoterapia del Agua Viva y el Teoterapista
- La Teoterapia: Un silbo suave y apacible
- Restauración Integral
- Agente del Cambio Siglo XXI
- La vida en célula,1 aporte para la paz
- El Pacto
- Las Fiestas Solemnes del Señor
- La Teoterapia y el Estrés (published posthumously)
- Una Identidad con Sentido (published posthumously)
