= Stephen F. Olford =

American evangelical leader (1918-2004)

Stephen F. Olford (March 29, 1918 – August 29, 2004) was an American evangelical leader. Billy Graham called him "the man who most influenced my ministry." Olford was also a friend to pastors Charles Stanley and Adrian Rogers, as well as being influential in the life of Jim Elliot. He was a pioneer in Christian television programming with his show Encounter, in New York, and his Sunday morning sermons were also broadcast around the world on radio. He was the founder and chairman of the board of Olford Ministries International. He also founded a pastor training center in Memphis, Tennessee, in 1988; the Stephen Olford Center is now owned and operated by Global Ministries Foundation. Olford's son David Olford continues training pastors and lay leaders in preaching at the center. Olford's authorized biography, Only One Life, was written by John Phillips.

== Biography ==
Stephen Frederick Olford was born in Zambia, the son of Plymouth Brethren Christian missionaries Frederick and Bessie Olford. He was raised in Angola. He spent his college years in the United Kingdom. A crisis experience, involving a motorcycle accident, led to his call into the ministry. After receiving ministry training, Olford was appointed an Army Scripture Reader during World War II; during the war, he often spoke with urgency to soldiers on matters of faith before they were deployed. He launched a Young Peoples Christian fellowship in Newport, South Wales. After the war, Olford was involved in extensive ministry throughout the U.K. and overseas.

In 1953, Olford began his years of pastoral ministry by serving the Duke Street Baptist Church in Richmond, Surrey, England (1953–1959), and then the Calvary Baptist Church in New York City (1959–1973). Olford systematized his method of expository preaching and formed a curriculum used to train preachers at the Olford Institute for Biblical Preaching in Memphis, Tennessee.

Olford was married for 56 years to the former Heather Brown; the couple had two sons, Jonathan and David. Heather Olford died in 2013. Olford received the Doctor of Theology degree from Luther Rice Seminary (then located in Jacksonville, Florida) and honorary Doctor of Divinity degrees from Wheaton College, Houghton College and Richmond College.

== Books ==
- Heart-cry for Revival (1969) ISBN 978-1-84550-075-7
- A Passion for Preaching: Reflections on the Art of Preaching (1989) ISBN 978-0-8407-7246-6
- Not I, But Christ (1997) ISBN 978-0-89107-943-9
- The Way of Holiness: Signposts to Guide Us (1998) ISBN 978-0-89107-977-4
- The Christian Message for Contemporary Life: The Gospel's Power to Change Lives (1999) ISBN 978-0-8254-3361-0
- The Sword of Suffering: Enduring Words of Hope, Inspiration and Healing in the Midst of Despair (2001) ISBN 978-0-89957-845-3
- Windows of Wisdom: Devotional Studies in Proverbs (2001) ISBN 978-1-59328-000-0
- Anointed Expository Preaching (2003) ISBN 978-0-8054-3129-2
- The Tabernacle: Camping with God (2004) ISBN 978-0-8254-3363-4
- Olford on Scroggie: Stephen Olford's Notes on the Sermon Outlines of Dr. Graham Scroggie (2008) ISBN 978-1-897117-83-5
- The Secret of Soul-Winning (1963) No ISBN listed. Moody Press; Chicago.
