= Elizabeth George (author) =

American writer and public speaker

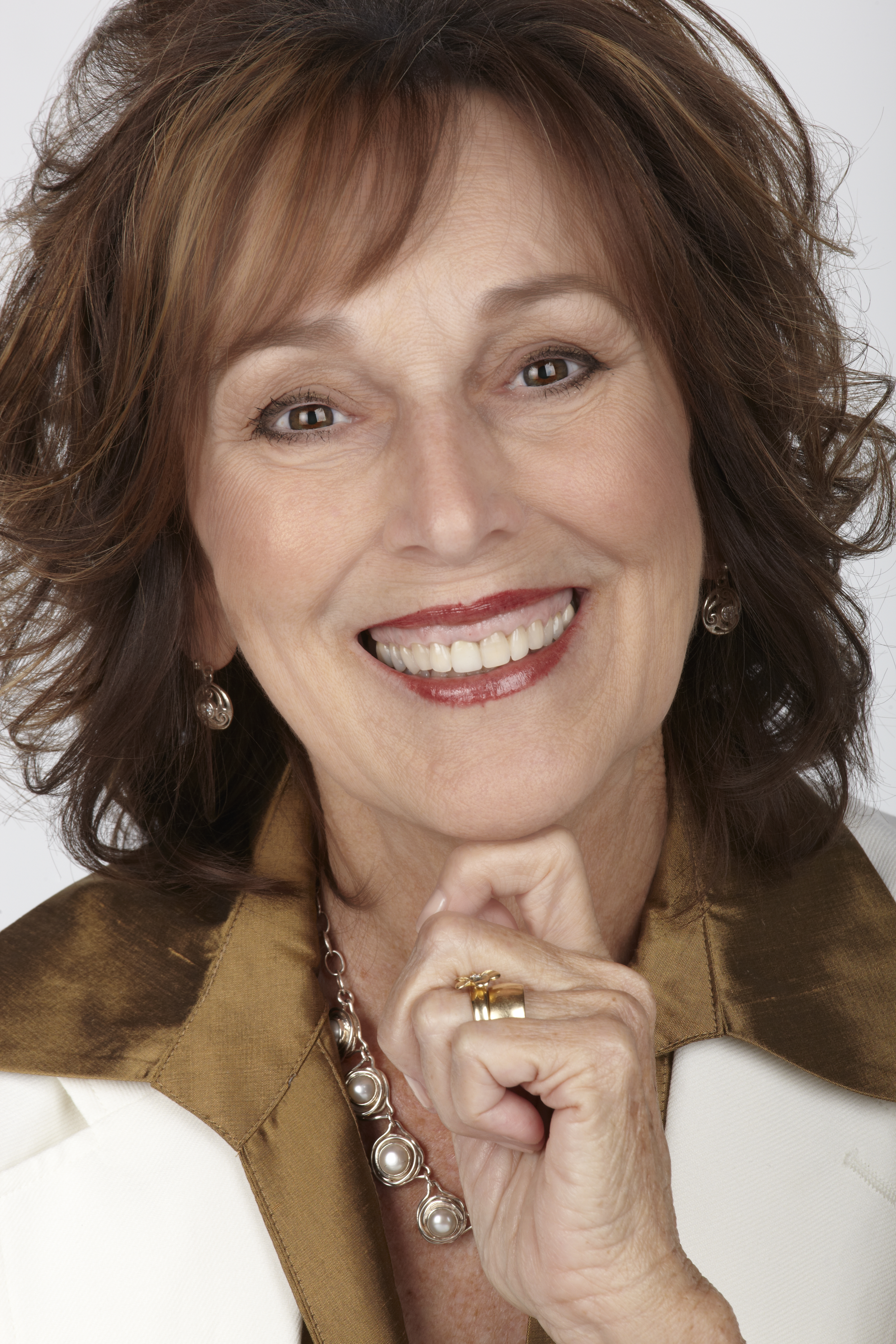
- Born: Elizabeth Ann George; 11 November 1944 (age 81); Granite, Oklahoma
- Education: University of Oklahoma (B.E.)
- Occupations: Author, motivational speaker, entrepreneur
- Spouse: Jim George (1965 - 2023; his death)
- Children: 2
- Writing career
- Genre: Religion
- Notable works: After God's Own Heart Series; A Young Woman's Guide to Making Right Choices
- Website: www.elizabethgeorge.com

Susan Elizabeth George (born 1944) is an American author and Christian speaker based in Seattle, Washington. She has written over 80 books and gift books aimed mainly at adult women, young adults, teens, tweens and children. She also co-authored 4 marriage books and 3 children's books with Jim George, her husband.

== Early life ==
George was born in Granite, Oklahoma 11 November 1944 to Richard Henry White and Ruth Harrison White. She graduated from College High School in Bartlesville, Oklahoma in 1962. She earned a Bachelor of Science in Education from The University of Oklahoma in 1966. Her first year out of college, George was a junior high and high school English and business teacher. She was also a Logos Bible Institute instructor and a Bible study lecturer and curriculum development team member at Grace Community Church in Sun Valley, California.

== Writing ==
George began writing in the early 1990s. She published her first book, Loving God with All Your Mind, in 1994.

== Reception ==
George was the recipient of the Harvest House Gold Award in 2002 and the Harvest House Platinum Award in 2004.

== Personal life ==
George married Jim George on 1 June 1965 in Bartlesville, Oklahoma. The couple met while attending The University of Oklahoma. George graduated from The University of Oklahoma in 1966. Today the Georges live in Seattle, Washington and spend time writing in Hawaii. They have two daughters. George and her husband have co-authored four marriage books and three children's books.

== Bibliography ==
Publication date	Title	Notes
1996	A Woman's Walk with God: Growing in the Fruit of the Spirit	
1997	A Woman After God's Own Heart	Recipient of the ECPA Gold Book Award in 2003
1998	Beautiful in God's Eyes	
1999	Loving God with All Your Mind	
1999	Walking with the Women of the Bible: A Devotional Journey Through God's Word	
1999	God Lights My Path	
2000	Putting on a Gentle and Quiet Spirit: 1 Peter	
2000	Experiencing God's Peace: Philippians	
2000	God's Wisdom for Little Girls: Virtues and Fun from Proverbs 31	Illustrated by Judy Luenebrink
2000	The Lord is My Shepherd	
2001	Growing in Wisdom and Faith: James	
2001	Becoming a Woman of Beauty & Strength: Esther	
2001	A Woman's High Calling	
2001	Walking in God's Promises: Character Studies: Sarah	
2001	Pursuing Godliness	
2002	A Young Woman After God's Own Heart	
2002	Life Management for Busy Woman	
2002	God's Little Girl is Kind	Illustrated by Judy Luenebrink
2002	God's Little Girl is Helpful	Illustrated by Judy Luenebrink
2002	God's Wisdom for Little Boys: Character-Building Fun from Proverbs	
2003	A Man and A Woman After God's Own Heart	
2003	Powerful Promises for Every Woman	
2003	Discovering the Treasures of a Godly Woman: Proverbs 31	
2003	God's Wisdom for a Woman's Life: Timeless Principles for Your Every Need	
2003	The Remarkable Women of the Bible	
2004	Powerful Promises for Every Couple: Putting God's Promises to Work in Your Life	
2004	God Loves His Precious Children: Safe in the Arms of the Good Shepherd	
2004	A Husband After God's Own Heart	
2004	Designing a Lifestyle That Pleases God: A Practical Guide	Written by Pat Ennis; foreword by Elizabeth George
2004	A Woman's Call to Prayer	
2004	Encouraging Words for a Woman After God's Own Heart	
2004	A Girl After God's Own Heart	2011 Christian Book Award Finalist
2004	A Wife After God's Own Heart	
2005	A Mom After God's Own Heart: 10 Ways to Love Your Children	2006 Retailers Choice Awards Finalist
2005	A Young Woman's Walk with God	Winner of Retailers Choice Award 2007 – Youth/Teen Category
2005	Living with Passion & Purpose	
2006	Small Changes for a Better Life: Daily Steps to Living God's Plan for You	
2007	Finding God's Path Through Your Trials	
2008	Understanding Your Blessings in Christ: Ephesians	
2009	Walking with God in the Quiet Places: Devotions for Women	Co-Authored by Stormie Omartian, Kay Arthur, Elizabeth George, Lysa TerKeurst, Sharon Jaynes, Julie Clinton, Emilie Barnes, and Jennifer Rothschild
2009	A Young Woman's Guide to Making Right Choices: Your Life God's Way	Winner of Retailers Choice Award 2010 – Youth/Teen Category
2009	Quiet Confidence for a Woman's Heart	
2009	Windows into the Word of God	
2009	Embracing God's Grace: Colossians/Philemon	
2009	Breaking the Worry Habit... Forever: God's Plan for Lasting Peace of Mind	
2010	A Woman Who Reflects the Heart of Jesus: 30 Days to Christlike Character	
2011	A Girl's Guide to Making Really Good Choices	
2011	A Young Woman Who Reflects the Heart of Jesus	
2012	A Mom After God's Own Heart Devotional	
2012	The Heart of a Woman Who Prays	
2012	Raising a Daughter After God's Own Heart	
2012	A Woman's Daily Walk with God	
2013	A Couple After God's Own Heart: Building a Lasting, Loving Marriage Together	written with Jim George
2013	Prayers to Calm Your Heart: Finding the Path to More Peace and Less Stress	
2013	Moments of Grace for a Woman's Heart	
2013	One-Minute Inspirations for Women	
2014	Beautiful in God's Eyes for Young Women	
2014	A Young Woman's Guide to Discovering Her Bible	
2015	A Young Woman After God's Own Heart, updated and Revised	
2015	A Girl's Guide to Discovering Her Bible	
2015	A Woman After God's Own Heart Updated and Expanded	
2015	A Woman After God's Own Heart, Growth and Study Guide, Updated and Expanded	

== See also ==
- Biblical patriarchy
