= Luther Rice College & Seminary =

Southern Baptist college in Lithonia, Georgia, US

- Type: Private college and seminary
- Established: June 14, 1962; 64 years ago
- Religious affiliation: Baptist
- Academic affiliations: SACS; TRACS; ABHE
- President: Steven Steinhilber
- Students: 1100
- Undergraduates: 450
- Postgraduates: 610
- Doctoral students: 40
- Location: Stonecrest, Georgia, US; 33°41′52.8″N 84°7′23.4″W
- Campus: Suburban
- Language: English
- Colors: Blue and Gold
- Website: lutherrice.edu

Luther Rice College & Seminary is a private Baptist college and seminary in Lithonia, Georgia. Through the college and seminary, the institution offers Georgia state-funded dual enrollment for eligible high school students, as well as bachelor's, master's, and doctoral degrees in fields including biblical studies, theology, business, psychology, pastoral ministry, biblical counseling, apologetics, and leadership. The institution also offers undergraduate programs designed to integrate ministry and marketplace preparation, including degree pathways that allow students to apply previously earned technical or trade-related credits toward a bachelor's degree. Luther Rice provides both on-campus and distance online education. The college and seminary are recognized as being theologically conservative.

== History ==
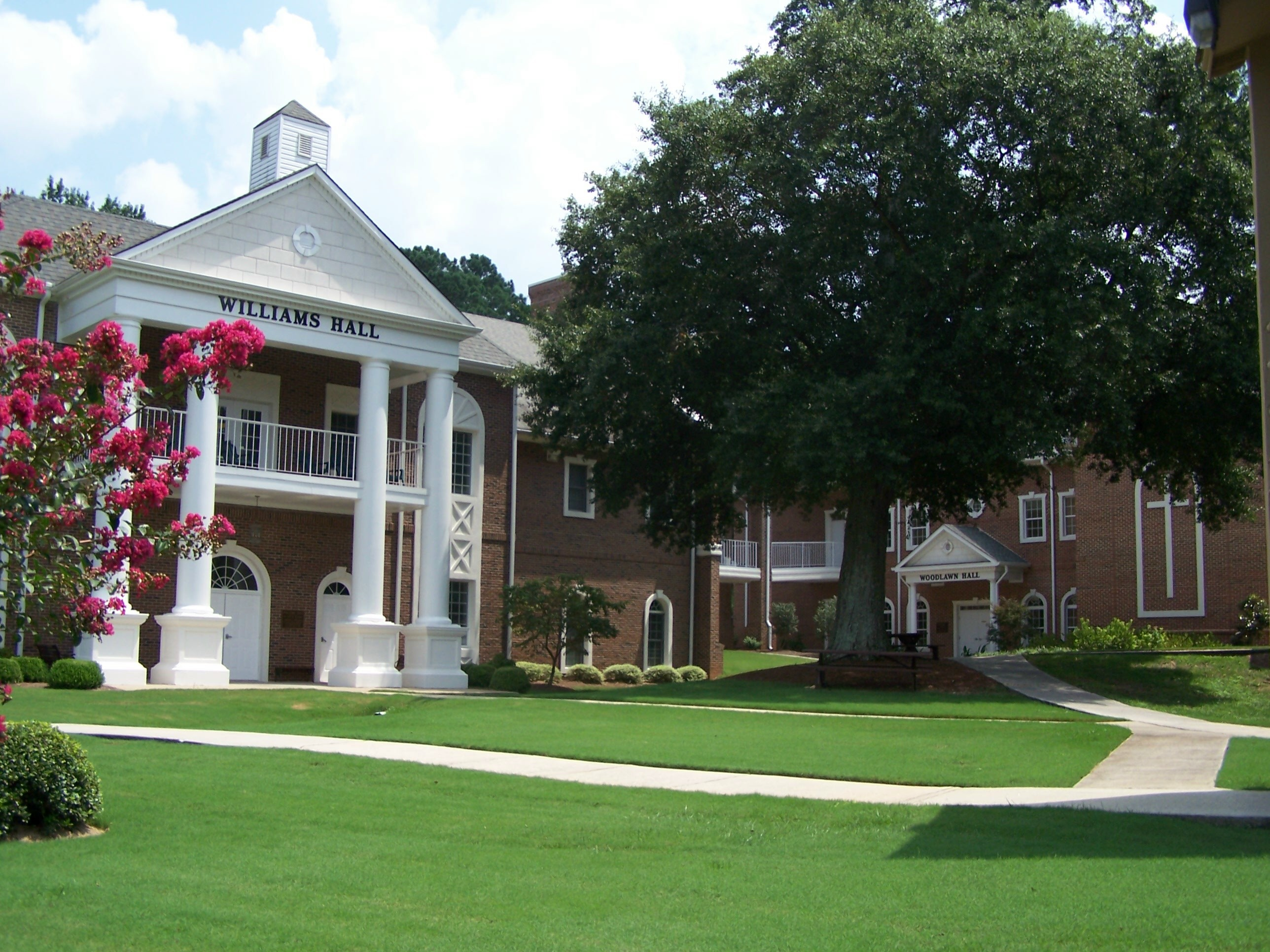
Williams Hall on the campus of Luther Rice

Luther Rice College & Seminary was founded in 1962 by Robert Gee Witty in Jacksonville, Florida, and named for Luther Rice, an educator, missionary, and clergyman in the early 1800s. The State of Florida granted the school's charter on June 14, 1962. Witty was elected President of the college in 1970, a position he held until 1982, when he retired to become Chancellor. In May 1993, James Flanagan became president of Luther Rice College & Seminary. He holds an earned Ph.D. from Southwestern Baptist Theological Seminary.

Steven Steinhilber joined the Luther Rice faculty in 2012, graduated with his M.Div. from Luther Rice in 2015, and became the Executive Vice President in 2016. Steinhilber was appointed the fifth President in July 2021. Steinhilber earned a Doctor of Ministry degree from the Clamp Divinity School of Anderson University.

In 1992, Luther Rice began its first full year of operation in Metro Atlanta, Georgia, after the college and seminary moved from Florida.

Luther Rice has an enrollment of about 1,100 students.

== Accreditation ==
Luther Rice College and Seminary is accredited by the Southern Association of Colleges and Schools and the Association for Biblical Higher Education (ABHE). It is also a member of the Transnational Association of Christian Colleges and Schools (TRACS).

== Undergraduate admissions ==
In 2024, the acceptance rate for Luther Rice was 34.3% with applicant competition considered high. Luther Rice does not require submission of standardized test scores and they are not considered for admission, even if submitted, the college admissions being Test Blind. The enrollment rate for those admitted was 75%.

== Student information ==
In 2024, the student to faculty ratio at Luther Rice was 10:1 and the graduation rate 11%. Men made up 62% of the enrollment while 38% were women. The racial makeup was 51% White, 45% Black, and 2% Hispanic. 60% of students received financial grant aid and the total cost of attendance (including tuition, fees, books and supplies, and estimated cost of living and other expenses) per year was $31,650.

== Notable alumni ==
- Charles Stanley (1932–2023), pastor, author, and longtime senior pastor of First Baptist Church of Atlanta
- John Ankerberg (born 1945), television host, author, and speaker
- Nestor Chamorro Pesantes (1936–2003), evangelist
- Jody Hice (born 1960), American politician from Georgia
- Dan Jenkins (1940–2007), American politician from Florida
- Stephen F. Olford (1918–2004), Christian leader
- Paul Schenck (born 1958), Catholic priest
- Anis Shorrosh (1933–2018), Palestinian Evangelical Christian author, speaker, and pastor
- Shelton Smith (born 1942), American preacher and author
- Ric Steel (born 1952), American musician from Tennessee
- Manuel Sykes, American pastor and civic leader from Florida
- Jerry Vines (born 1937), American preacher
- Spiros Zodhiates (1922–2009), Greek-American Bible scholar
