= The son of man came to serve =

Episode in the New Testament

The phrase "the son of man came to serve" refers to a specific episode in the New Testament. In the Gospel of Matthew 20:20–28 and the Gospel of Mark 10:35–45, Jesus explains that he "came as Son of man to give his life as ransom". The ransom paid by the Son of man is an element of a common doctrine of atonement in Christianity.

In the Gospel of Mark 10:35–45, this episode takes place shortly after Jesus predicts his death, and then says:

You know that those who are regarded as rulers of the Gentiles lord it over them, and their high officials exercise authority over them. Not so with you. Instead, whoever wants to become great among you must be your servant, and whoever wants to be first must be slave of all. For even the Son of Man did not come to be served, but to serve, and to give his life as a ransom for many.

In the Gospel of Luke 22:24–27, Jesus expounds on the import of serving:

A dispute also arose among them as to which of them was considered to be greatest. Jesus said to them, "The kings of the Gentiles lord it over them; and those who exercise authority over them call themselves Benefactors. But you are not to be like that. Instead, the greatest among you should be like the youngest, and the one who rules like the one who serves. For who is greater, the one who is at the table or the one who serves? Is it not the one who is at the table? But I am among you as one who serves."

The identification of Jesus with the son of man in the context of the Book of Daniel (7:13–14) places the death of Jesus and the ransom he pays at a higher level of prominence than the death of other prophets and martyrs, even that of his contemporary John the Baptist. Later in the New Testament account, in Matthew 26:63–64, when Jesus considers himself the son of man spoken of in the Book of Daniel, the Jewish high priests accuse him of blasphemy.

== See also ==
- Life of Jesus in the New Testament
