= Healing the ear of a servant =

Miracle carried out by Jesus according to the Bible

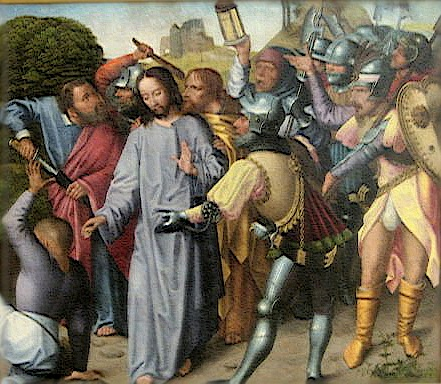
The Arrest of Christ (c. 1500), by the Master of the Evora Altarpiece, portrays Jesus healing the ear of a servant during his arrest (Museu de Évora, Portugal)

Healing the ear of a servant is one of the miracles of Jesus in the Gospels. Even though the incident of the servant's ear being cut off is recorded in all four gospels, Matthew 26:51; Mark 14:47; Luke 22:51; and John 18:10–11; the servant and the disciple are named as Malchus and Simon Peter only in John. Only Luke records that Jesus healed the servant.

The Gospel of Luke (22:49-51) describes Jesus healing the servant of a high priest during the Arrest of Jesus after one of the followers of Jesus had cut his right ear off:

When Jesus' followers saw what was going to happen, they said, "Lord, should we strike with our swords?" And one of them struck the servant of the high priest, cutting off his right ear. But Jesus answered, "No more of this!" And he touched the man's ear and healed him.

This healing episode follows the kiss of Judas and is the last miracle reported in the Canonical Gospels prior to the Crucifixion of Jesus.
