= Dillon Burroughs =

American spiritual writer (born 1976)

- Born: 1976 (age 49–50); Norwalk, Ohio
- Education: Indiana State University (B.A.) Dallas Theological Seminary (Th.M.) Piedmont International University (PhD.)
- Occupation: Writer
- Website: www.dillonburroughs.com

Dillon Burroughs is an ECPA-bestselling American author or co-author of more than thirty-eight books.

== Biography ==
Dillon Burroughs is author or co-author of more than thirty-eight books. Known for his collaborative writing efforts, his works range from editing The Apologetics Study Bible for Students to serving behind the scenes for some of today's New York Times best-selling authors. He also serves as senior writer for The John Ankerberg Show.

== Bibliography ==
=== Non-Fiction ===
- Faith Acts: A Provocative Call to Living What You Believe (2016 with Jimmy Turner) (New Hope Publishers)
- Servant Leadership and Veteran Youth Pastors (2015) (Piedmont International University Dissertation)
- Activist Faith: From Him and For Him (July 2013 with Daniel Darling and Dan King) (Navpress)
- Hunger No More (September 2012) (New Hope Publishers)
- Thirst No More (November 2011) (New Hope Publishers)
- Not in My Town: Ending America's Modern Day Slave Trade (June 2011 with Charles Powell) (New Hope Publishers)
- Undefending Christianity (March 2011) (Harvest House)
- Apologetics Study Bible-Student Edition (Associate Editor) (February 2010) (General Editor, Sean McDowell) (B&H)
- God in 60 Seconds (January 2010) (with John Ankerberg) (Harvest House)
- Israel Under Fire: Study Guide (October 2009) (with John Ankerberg and Jimmy DeYoung) (ATRI)
- Israel Under Fire (September 2009) (with John Ankerberg and Jimmy DeYoung) (Harvest House)
- Taking a Stand for the Bible (January 2009) (with John Ankerberg) (Harvest House)
- Extreme Exploits (March 2009) (with Dr. Danny Lovett) (B&H)
- The Facts on the Masonic Lodge (March 2009) (with John Ankerberg and John Weldon) (Harvest House)
- The Facts on the Mormon Church (March 2009) (with John Ankerberg and John Weldon) (Harvest House)
- The Facts on Roman Catholicism (March 2009 2008) (with John Ankerberg and John Weldon) (Harvest House)
- The Facts on World Religions (April 2009) (with John Ankerberg and John Weldon) (Harvest House)
- The Facts on the Bible (April 2009) (with John Ankerberg and John Weldon) (Harvest House)
- Generation Hex: Understanding the Subtle Dangers of Wicca (August 2008) (with Marla Alupoaicei) (Harvest House)
- The Facts on Halloween (August 2008) (with John Ankerberg and John Weldon) (Harvest House)
- The Facts on Jehovah's Witnesses (August 2008) (with John Ankerberg and John Weldon) (Harvest House)
- The Facts on Islam (August 2008) (with John Ankerberg and John Weldon) (Harvest House)
- How Can We Know God Exists? (with John Ankerberg) (AMG)
- How Do We Know Jesus Is God? (with John Ankerberg) (AMG)
- How Reliable Is the Bible? (with John Ankerberg) (AMG)
- Why Does God Allow Suffering & Evil? (with John Ankerberg) (AMG)
- What’s the Big Deal about Other Religions? (with John Ankerberg) (Harvest House)
- What Can Be Found in LOST? (with John Ankerberg) (Harvest House)
- Defending Your Faith (with John Ankerberg) (AMG)
- What’s the Big Deal about Jesus? (with John Ankerberg) (Harvest House)
- Comparing Christianity with World Religions (with Steve Cory) (Moody)
- Comparing Christianity with the Cults (with Keith Brooks and Irvine Robrtson) (Moody)
- Middle East Meltdown (with John Ankerberg) (Harvest House)
- Get in the Game (with Tony Evans and Jonathan Evans) (Moody)
- The Da Vinci Code Controversy (with John Ankerberg and Michael Easley) (Moody)

=== Other Titles ===
- The Jesus Family Tomb Controversy (2007) (Nimble Books)
- Misquotes in Misquoting Jesus (2006) (Nimble Books)
- The Use of the Bible in The Da Vinci Code (2006) (Amazon Shorts)

=== Films ===
- Not in My Town: Ending America's Modern Day Slave Trade (Summer 2011 with Charles Powell) (New Hope/Mercy Movement)
- Israel under Fire (September 2009) (with John Ankerberg and Jimmy DeYoung) (Harvest House)
- Paranormal (2010) (script consultant/discussion guide editor) (Cross Shadow Productions)
- Pray 2.5 (2009) (discussion guide editor) (Cross Shadow Productions)
- Pray 2 (2008) (discussion guide editor) (Cross Shadow Productions)
