= AMG International =

Non-profit organization in the USA

AMG International is a Christian ministry based in Chattanooga, Tennessee. The acronym AMG stands for "Advancing the Ministries of the Gospel". It was founded in 1942 in New York City as the American Committee for the Evangelization of the Greeks by George Georgakis. Shortly thereafter, it became the American Mission to the Greeks. Spiros Zodhiates became its director in 1947. Originally focused on the Greeks, it is now active in more than 40 countries.
