= Parable of the Strong Man =

Parable taught by Jesus of Nazareth according to Christian gospels

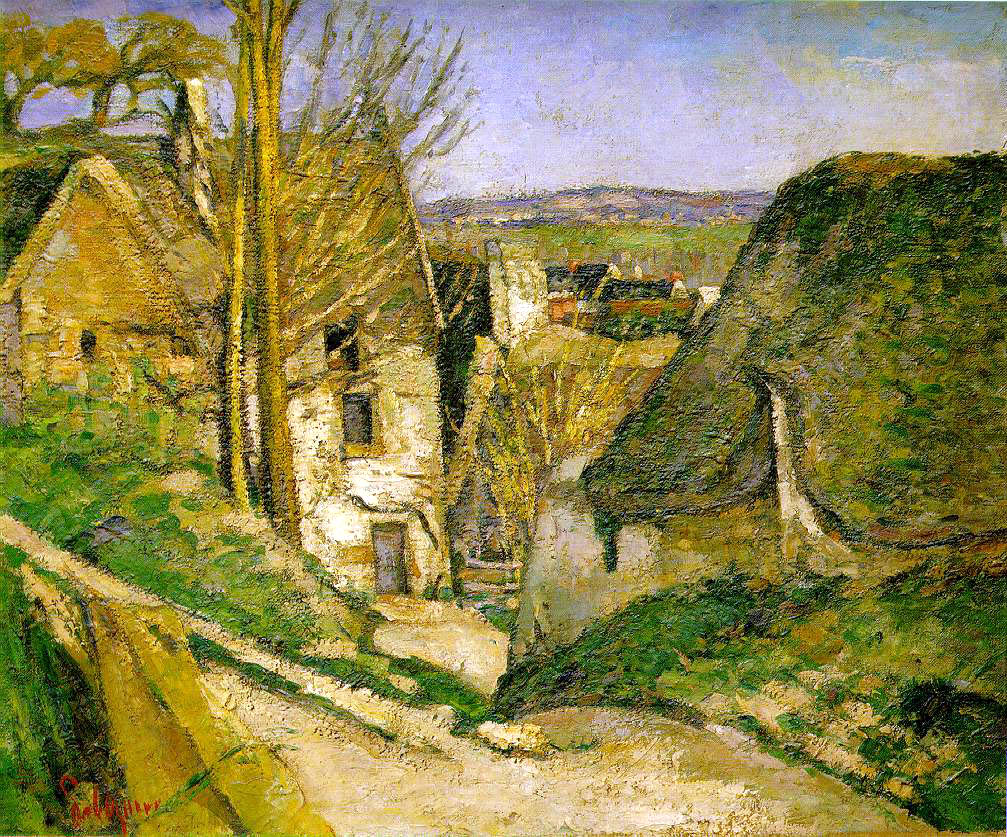
The Hanged Man's House, Cézanne, 1873.

The Parable of the strong man (also known as the parable of the burglar and the parable of the powerful man) is a parable told by Jesus in the New Testament, found in Matthew 12:29, Mark 3:27, and Luke 11:21–22, and also in the non-canonical Gospel of Thomas where it is known as logion 35

== Text ==
In Matthew chapter 12, the parable is as follows:

Or how can someone enter a strong man’s house and plunder his goods, unless he first binds the strong man? Then indeed he may plunder his house.

— Matthew 12:29, English Standard Version

In Mark chapter 3, the parable is as follows:

No one can enter a strong man’s house and plunder his goods, unless he first binds the strong man. And then he will plunder his house.

— Mark 3:27, New King James Version

In Luke chapter 11, the parable is as follows:

When the strong man, fully armed, guards his own dwelling, his goods are safe. But when someone stronger attacks him and overcomes him, he takes from him his whole armour in which he trusted, and divides his spoils.

— Luke 11:21-22, World English Bible

== Interpretation ==
In the canonical gospels of Matthew, Mark, and Luke, this parable forms part of the Beelzebul controversy, where Jesus's opponents accuse him of gaining his power to exorcise demons by being in league with Satan. In a common Interpretation, the strong man represents Satan, and the attacker represents Jesus. Satan has control over the earth (the house), but Jesus defeats Satan with his earthly ministry (tying Satan up).

Jesus thus says that he could not perform exorcisms (represented by stealing the strong man's possessions) unless he was opposed to – and had defeated – Satan (represented by tying up the strong man). Craig S. Keener suggests that the parable relates to the common wisdom that "no one plunders a strong man," while R. T. France and others see the parable as echoing the Book of Isaiah:

Can plunder be taken from warriors,
or captives rescued from the fierce?

But this is what the LORD says:
"Yes, captives will be taken from warriors,
and plunder retrieved from the fierce;
I will contend with those who contend with you,
and your children I will save. (Isaiah 49:24–25, NIV)

It has been suggested that "Beelzebul" means "house of Ba'al", and that the image of the strong man's house was originally a wordplay on this.

In the non-canonical Gospel of Thomas, which does not have the context of the Beelzebul controversy, the parable has been interpreted as merely suggesting that "the strong man must be free to protect his house and belongings. The thief must understand this situation in order to accomplish his goal of plundering. Jesus does not seem to oppose or condemn this person".

Some charismatic traditions in the United States interpret the passage with more emphasis on the exorcistic nature of the parable, believing the strong man to be emblematic of specific types of spirits that are overcome by Jesus’ power.
