= John Ankerberg =

Christian TV host and author

- Born: December 10, 1945 (age 80); Chicago, Illinois, U.S.
- Education: University of Illinois at Chicago; Trinity Evangelical Divinity School (MA, MDiv); Luther Rice College and Seminary (DMin)
- Occupations: Evangelist, Television personality, author, apologist theologian
- Employer: Ankerberg Theological Research Institute (President)
- Known for: Founder, President of Ankerberg Theological Research Institute, Chicago, IL; Host, The John Ankerberg Show TV program (syndicated)
- Title: John Ankerberg
- Spouse: Darlene
- Children: 1 daughter, Michelle
- Website: www.johnankerberg.com

John Ankerberg (born December 10, 1945) is an American Christian television host, author, and speaker. He is an ordained Baptist minister and has authored or coauthored more than 150 books and study guides. He is the producer and host of the internationally televised weekly program The John Ankerberg Show.

== Early life and education ==
Ankerberg earned an undergraduate degree from the University of Illinois at Chicago, an M.A. in Church History and Philosophy of Christian Thought, and a Master of Divinity from Trinity Evangelical Divinity School. He earned a Doctor of Ministry from Luther Rice Seminary in Lithonia, Georgia. He is an ordained Baptist minister.

== Ministry ==
His ministry, the John Ankerberg Show, launched in 1980 on one network in Kansas City, Missouri. His organization notes:

"While speaking at a Youth for Christ summer camp, he was first asked to host a Kansas City Christian television program. Structuring the program with a debate-format, the show quickly caught the attention of other networks. After moving to Chattanooga, Tennessee to serve another media ministry, The John Ankerberg Show was picked up on CBN, a new network that soon expanded nationwide. Within a short time, Dr. Ankerberg’s side project quickly became a full-time ministry in 1980, renting office space and studio time to produce additional programs."

The television program airs on Daystar, God TV, and internationally in 10 languages with 4.5 billion potential viewers in virtually every nation.

Influential among conservative evangelicals, John Ankerberg was a noted influence in the life of Arkansas governor and Republican presidential candidate Mike Huckabee. In 2018, Ankerberg met with a delegation of leaders regarding international Christian persecution with Vice President Mike Pence.

== National Religious Broadcasters ==
Ankerberg is a member of the board of directors of the National Religious Broadcasters, a position he has held on multiple occasions. He was most recently noted as a member of the Board Class of 2020.

== Bakker and PTL scandal ==
In 1987, Ankerberg presented evidence that exposed the moral failings of televangelist Jim Bakker, which included solicitation for sex and homosexual relations.

== Evangelicals and Catholics Together ==
In 1995, Ankerberg and other evangelical leaders expressed opposition to the proposed Evangelicals and Catholics Together ecumenical document designed to foster a sense of unity and cooperation between Protestant evangelicals and Catholics. This opposition resulted in a meeting that drafted an amendment clarifying the beliefs of the evangelical signers, which stated that "cooperation with evangelically committed Roman Catholics, does not imply acceptance of Roman Catholic doctrinal distinctives or endorsement of the Roman Catholic Church system." Ankerberg stated that the meeting "heals the breach", but "failed to mollify the concerns of many evangelicals."

== Politics ==
Ankerberg has stated that he is non-partisan when it comes to voting for president.

== Personal life ==
Ankerberg is married to his wife Darlene; they have one adult daughter. The Ankerbergs have lived in Chattanooga, Tennessee, since 1980.

== Awards ==
- Recipient of the William Ward Ayer Award for Distinguished Service – National Religious Broadcasters, 2015
- “The Television Program Producer of the Year Award”, National Religious Broadcasters, 1992
