= Luke 14 =

- ← chapter 13 chapter 15 →
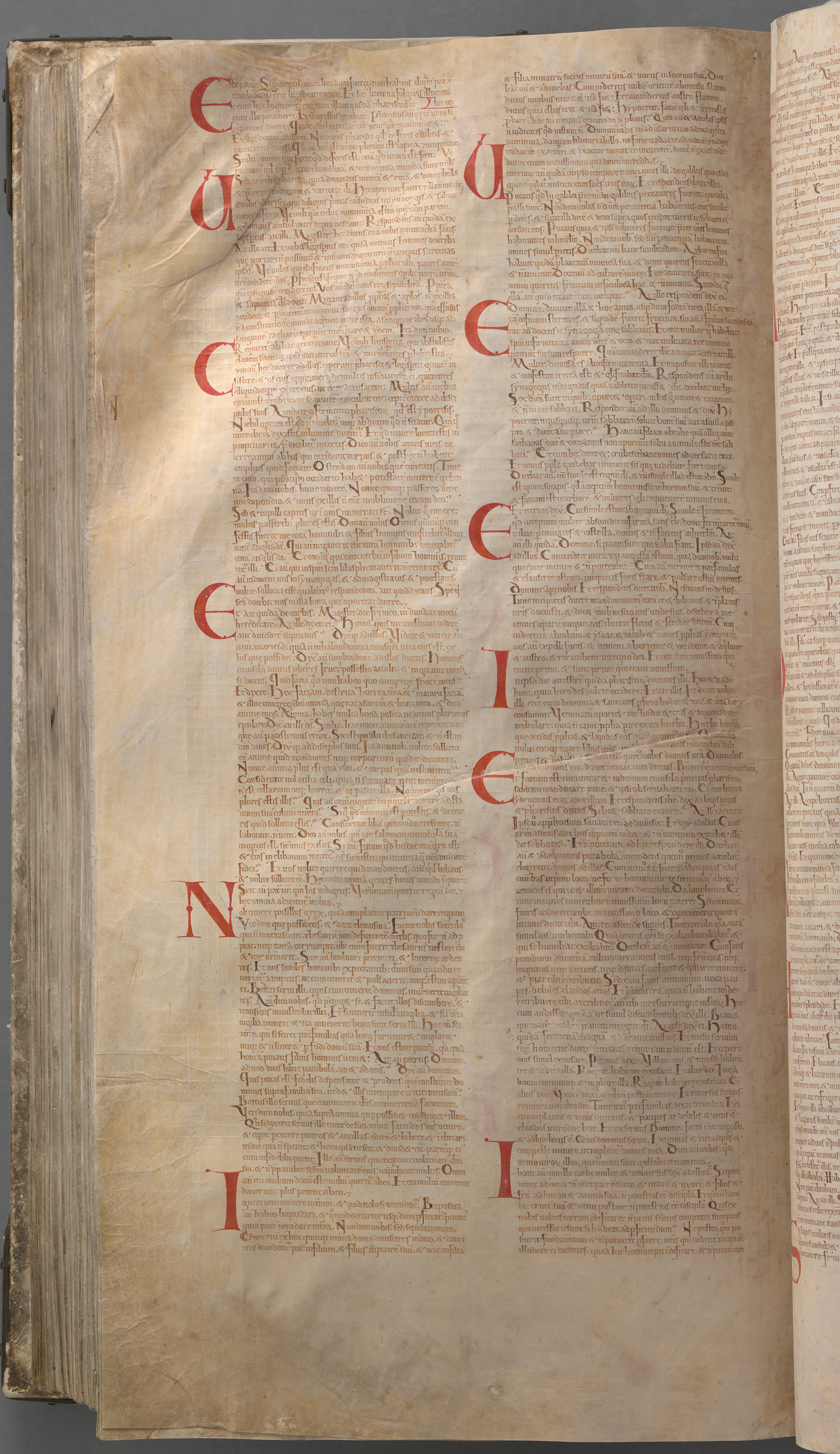
- The Latin text of Luke 11:35–14:30 in Codex Gigas (13th century)
- Book: Gospel of Luke
- Category: Gospel
- Christian Bible part: New Testament
- Order in the Christian part: 3

Luke 14 is the fourteenth chapter of the Gospel of Luke in the New Testament of the Christian Bible. It records one miracle performed by Jesus Christ on a Sabbath day, followed by his teachings and parables, where he "inculcates humility ... and points out whom we should invite to our feasts, if we expect spiritual remuneration". Early Christian tradition uniformly affirmed that Luke the Evangelist composed this Gospel as well as the Acts of the Apostles. Critical opinion on the tradition was evenly divided at the end of the 20th century.

== Text ==
The original text was written in Koine Greek. Some early manuscripts containing the text of this chapter are:

- Papyrus 75 (AD 175–225; verse 27 contains a staurogram)
- Papyrus 45 (~250)
- Codex Vaticanus (325–350)
- Codex Sinaiticus (330–360)
- Codex Bezae (~400)
- Codex Washingtonianus (~400)
- Codex Alexandrinus (400–440)
- Papyrus 97 (~600; extant verses 7–14)

This chapter is divided into 35 verses.

== Jesus being carefully watched ==
The chapter opens on a Sabbath day when Jesus has been invited into the home of one of the rulers of the Pharisees, presumably directly after the synagogue service. He is 'watched carefully' or 'craftily'. F. W. Farrar in the Cambridge Bible for Schools and Colleges notes a resonance with the words of Psalm 37:32:

The wicked watches the righteous, and seeks to slay him.

A man with dropsy (swellings caused by bodily fluids, also called edema) is there. While he may have come as one "well known to the family", Irish Archbishop John McEvilly suggests that he may have been "introduced by the Pharisees on purpose to see if our Lord would cure him on the Sabbath".

=== Verses 3–6 ===
And Jesus, answering, spoke to the lawyers and Pharisees, saying, “Is it lawful to heal on the Sabbath?”

Nothing had been said; Jesus responds to the thoughts of his adversaries. He heals the man, and lets him go (or sends him away). A further dialogue follows:

"Which of you, having a son or an ox that has fallen into a well, will not immediately pull him out on a sabbath day?"
And they could not reply to this.

Some manuscripts, in place of "a son", refer to a donkey.

== Go and sit in the lowest place ==
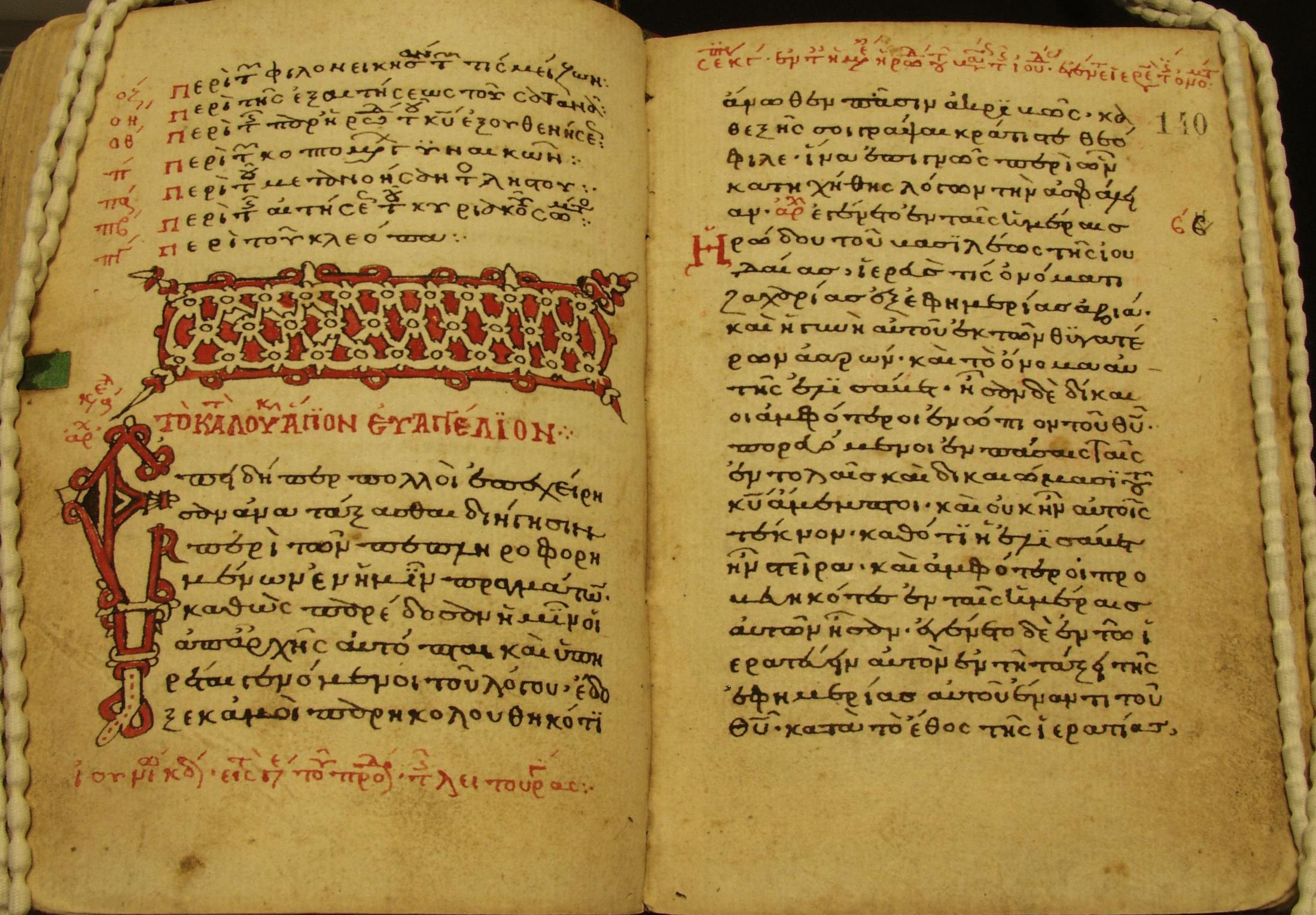
The Gospel of Luke, Minuscule 2444, 13th century

This pericope (verses 7 to 14), also known as the Parable of the Wedding Feast, is one of the parables of Jesus which is only found in the Gospel of Luke in the New Testament and directly precedes the Parable of the Great Banquet in Luke 14:15–24. In Matthew's Gospel, the parallel passage to Luke's Parable of the Great Banquet is also set as a wedding feast (Matthew 22:1–14).

Jesus always made his parables relatable to the layman. A wedding, in the days of the Jews, was a very sacred and joyous thing. Some even lasted up to or more than a week. When Jesus told this parable, many people were able to understand the picture he was trying to create because he used a Jewish wedding as the setting of the story.

Luke's saying that "Everyone that exalteth himself shall be humbled, but he that humbleth himself shall be exalted" is also found in Luke 18:14 and Matthew 23:12. It is similar to Matthew 18:4.

David Brown notes that this parable includes "a reproduction" of Proverbs 25:6–7.

== Parable of the Great Supper ==
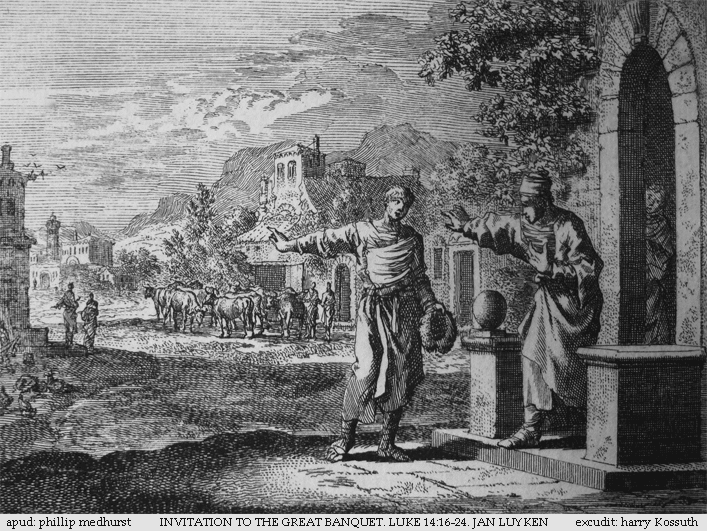
Jan Luyken: Invitation to the Great Banquet, from the Bowyer Bible

The Parable of the Great Banquet or the Wedding Feast or the Marriage of the King's Son (verses 16–24) is also found in Matthew 22:1–14. A variant of the parable also appears in Saying 64 of the Gnostic Gospel of Thomas. "Everything is now ready" (verse 17) and many guests are invited to the banquet, but they "all alike" offered excuses, of which three examples are given.

St Cyril of Jerusalem sees the servant who was sent to invite the guests as Christ and interprets "everything is now ready" to encompass "the good things bestowed upon the world through Him, the removal of sins, the participation of the Holy Spirit, [and] the glory of adoption".

The eschatological image of a wedding also occurs in the parable of the Faithful Servant and the parable of the Ten Virgins. Here, it includes the extension of the original invitation (to Jews) to also include Gentiles. In Luke, the invitation is extended particularly to "the poor, the crippled, the blind and the lame" (Luke 14:21), evidencing explicit concern for the "poor and the outcasts".

== Leaving All to Follow Christ ==
Counting the Cost, or in the NIV: The Cost of Being a Disciple or in the NRSV: The Cost of Discipleship or in the NKJV: Leaving All to Follow Christ, are titles given to verses 25–33 in this chapter, which include a pair of illustrations of the importance of deliberating in advance "whether they were able and prepared to bear all their losses and persecutions to which the profession of the gospel would expose them". The first title comes from the phrase "count the cost", which occurs in the King James Version of the passage, as well as some other versions.

Eric Franklin argues that the requirement to "hate" in verse 26 is "Semitic exaggeration",; the Jerusalem Bible calls it a "Hebraism" whose call is "not for hate, but for total detachment, and Joseph Benson envisages that hatred "signifies only an inferior degree of love".

American New Testament scholar Joel B. Green suggests that it is unclear what kind of tower is being referred to in the first illustration, but notes that the message is that a "thoroughgoing fidelity to God's salvific aim" is required, "manifest in one's identity as a disciple of Jesus". This involves putting family and possessions second, as in Matthew 8:18–22 and Luke 9:57–62. This command is interpreted and practised in different ways by different Christians. Some groups, such as the Bruderhof or Hutterites see it as a call to forsake all possessions to follow Jesus. Others read it simply as a matter of having Christ be the center of one's heart.

== Salt ==
^{34} Salt is good; but if the salt has lost its flavor, how shall it be seasoned? ^{35} It is neither fit for the land nor for the dunghill, but men throw it out. He who has ears to hear, let him hear!

Salt is 'good' in biblical thought for giving taste where there is none. Job asks Can flavorless food be eaten without salt? Salt preserves what would otherwise perish, and Numbers 18:19 refers to a covenant of salt between the LORD and Aaron and his descendants, but "whether salt can lose its flavour has been much debated".

== See also ==
- Sermon on the Mount
- Sermon on the Plain
- Ministry of Jesus
- Parables of Jesus
- Other related Bible parts: Matthew 5, 22, 23

Preceded by Luke 13	Chapters of the Bible; Gospel of Luke	Succeeded by Luke 15
