= Parable of the Great Banquet =

Parable taught by Jesus of Nazareth according to Christian gospels

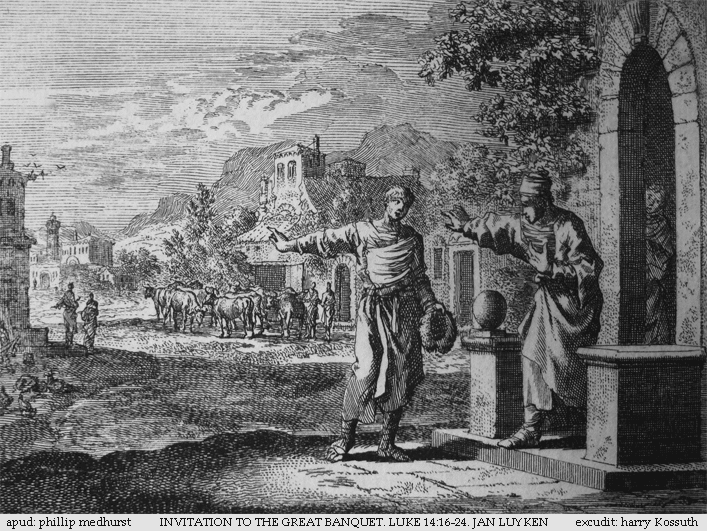
Jan Luyken: the invitation, Bowyer Bible

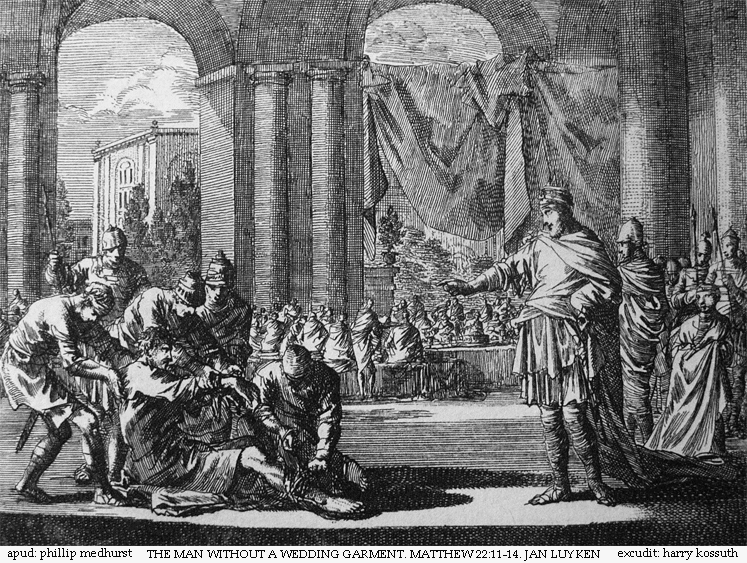
Jan Luyken: the man without a wedding garment, Bowyer Bible

The Parable of the Great Banquet or the Wedding Feast or the Marriage of the King's Son is a parable told by Jesus in the New Testament, found in Matthew 22:1–14 and Luke 14:15–24.

It is not to be confused with a different Parable of the Wedding Feast recorded in the Gospel of Luke.

== Context and narrative ==
In Matthew, the parable is in reply to the chief priests and Pharisees questioning Jesus' authority. In Luke, the parable is in reply to someone saying, "Blessed is the one who will dine in the kingdom of God." The parable is about a Seudat Nissuin, which Jews in New Testament times were required to attend.

The version of the parable in the Gospel of Matthew is as follows:

Jesus answered and spoke again in parables to them, saying, "The Kingdom of Heaven is like a certain king, who made a marriage feast for his son, and sent out his servants to call those who were invited to the marriage feast, but they would not come. Again he sent out other servants, saying, 'Tell those who are invited, "Behold, I have prepared my dinner. My cattle and my fatlings are killed, and all things are ready. Come to the marriage feast!"' But they made light of it, and went their ways, one to his own farm, another to his merchandise, and the rest grabbed his servants, and treated them shamefully, and killed them. When the king heard that, he was angry, and sent his armies, destroyed those murderers, and burned their city. "Then he said to his servants, 'The wedding is ready, but those who were invited weren't worthy. Go therefore to the intersections of the highways, and as many as you may find, invite to the marriage feast.' Those servants went out into the highways, and gathered together as many as they found, both bad and good. The wedding was filled with guests. But when the king came in to see the guests, he saw there a man who didn't have on wedding clothing, and he said to him, 'Friend, how did you come in here not wearing wedding clothing?' He was speechless. Then the king said to the servants, 'Bind him hand and foot, take him away, and throw him into the outer darkness; there is where the weeping and grinding of teeth will be.' For many are called, but few chosen."

— Matthew 22:1–14, World English Bible

The version in the Gospel of Luke is somewhat shorter, and refers only to a banquet rather than a wedding feast:

...Then Jesus said to him, "Someone gave a great dinner and invited many. At the time for the dinner he sent his slave to say to those who had been invited, 'Come; for everything is ready now.' But they all alike began to make excuses. The first said to him, 'I have bought a piece of land, and I must go out and see it; please accept my regrets.' Another said, 'I have bought five yoke of oxen, and I am going to try them out; please accept my regrets.' Another said, 'I have just been married, and therefore I cannot come.' So the slave returned and reported this to his master. Then the owner of the house became angry and said to his slave, 'Go out at once into the streets and lanes of the town and bring in the poor, the crippled, the blind, and the lame.' And the slave said, 'Sir, what you ordered has been done, and there is still room.' Then the master said to the slave, 'Go out into the roads and lanes, and compel people to come in, so that my house may be filled. For I tell you, none of those who were invited will taste my dinner.'"

— Luke 14:15–24, NRSV

The non-canonical Gospel of Thomas also includes the parable as saying 64; its version is quite close to Luke's, although ends slightly differently with a conclusion that "Buyers and traders [will] not enter the places of my father."

== Interpretation ==
The classical interpretation of Matthew's version of the parable is that the king is God; the king's son is Jesus himself; the original invited guests are the Jews; the king's servants who are attacked are God's prophets; and the new guests are the Gentiles and other "unworthy". The eschatological image of a wedding used by Matthew also occurs in the parable of the Faithful Servant and the parable of the Ten Virgins. The original invitation to the Jews is extended to also include Gentiles. In Luke, the invitation is extended particularly to the "poor, the crippled, the blind and the lame" (Luke 14:21), evidencing explicit concern for the "poor and the outcasts."

In early Christianity, the parable may have been taken more openly as a direct reference to Jews who did not convert to Christianity; in particular, the reference in Matthew to the king sending his armies, destroying the murderers, and burning their city seems to be a reference to the destruction of Jerusalem in AD 70 by Roman armies. Later Christian interpretations have adjusted the original guests more generally to be the already religious who have no time for God, including Christians: they are people who accepted an invitation, but when the food is ready, claim they are too busy to turn up.

Matthew's version additionally suggests that even some of the newly invited guests are not worthy of sitting at the table, if they are not wearing a proper wedding garment. What exactly the wedding garment symbolizes is not generally agreed upon among Christian theologians. Some commentators suggest that the wedding clothes or garment in this parable were provided by the host, but this is unlikely to be the intended implication. Augustine of Hippo interpreted the garment as symbolizing charity, an interpretation not widely accepted even in medieval times. Martin Luther suggested that the garment represented Christ himself. John Calvin felt these controversies in interpreting the meaning of the "wedding garment" were overblown:

As to the wedding garment, is it faith, or is it a holy life? This is a useless controversy; for faith cannot be separated from good works, nor do good works proceed from any other source than from faith. Christ intended only to state that the Lord calls us on the express condition of our being renewed by the Spirit [...] and that, in order to our remaining permanently in his house, we must put off the old man with his pollutions [...] and lead a new life.

— John Calvin, Commentary on Matthew, Mark, Luke, Volume 2

Other commentators focus on the role of clothing (or, in this case, the lack of appropriate clothing) in the New Testament (see Biblical clothing). Bernard Brandon Scott notes that the parable immediately follows the parable of the Wicked Husbandmen in Matthew, and that the harsh treatment of the man without wedding clothes is related to the harsh treatment of the bad tenants in that parable: people hired or invited by the king (God) who do not perform their duties.

In the Gospel of Thomas, the parable "becomes an exhortation against the affairs of business and a life of gain", reflecting Gnosticism's prizing of ascetic lifestyles.

The theme of a divine invitation, human rejection, and ultimate judgment also appears in the Quran, notably in Surah Al-Haqqah (69:26–37). This passage vividly describes the fate of those who deny truth and fail to fulfill their moral duties. It includes the command, "Take him, and shackle him, then burn him in the Blaze" (69:30–31), which parallels the harsh judgment in the Biblical parable where the king orders, "Bind him hand and foot, take him away, and throw him into the outer darkness." Both texts underscore the significance of responding to divine guidance and the moral preparedness required for ultimate acceptance.

In Islam, there is a parable also given about a feast in which a person is sent to invite others to a feast.

== Historicity ==
Many scholars increasingly favor the Farrer hypothesis in favor of Luke’s use of Matthew or vice versa. Matthew's version and the version in Luke and Thomas do not entirely line up; textual critics generally suspect it is more likely that it is Matthew's version that drifted from the original, as parts of it seem to be an explanation of the destruction of Jerusalem as divine punishment too closely. Matthew's version makes more sense for a church that has many more Gentiles in it than the one at the time of Jesus's death and additionally has knowledge of the outcome of the First Jewish–Roman War.

== Art and hymnody ==
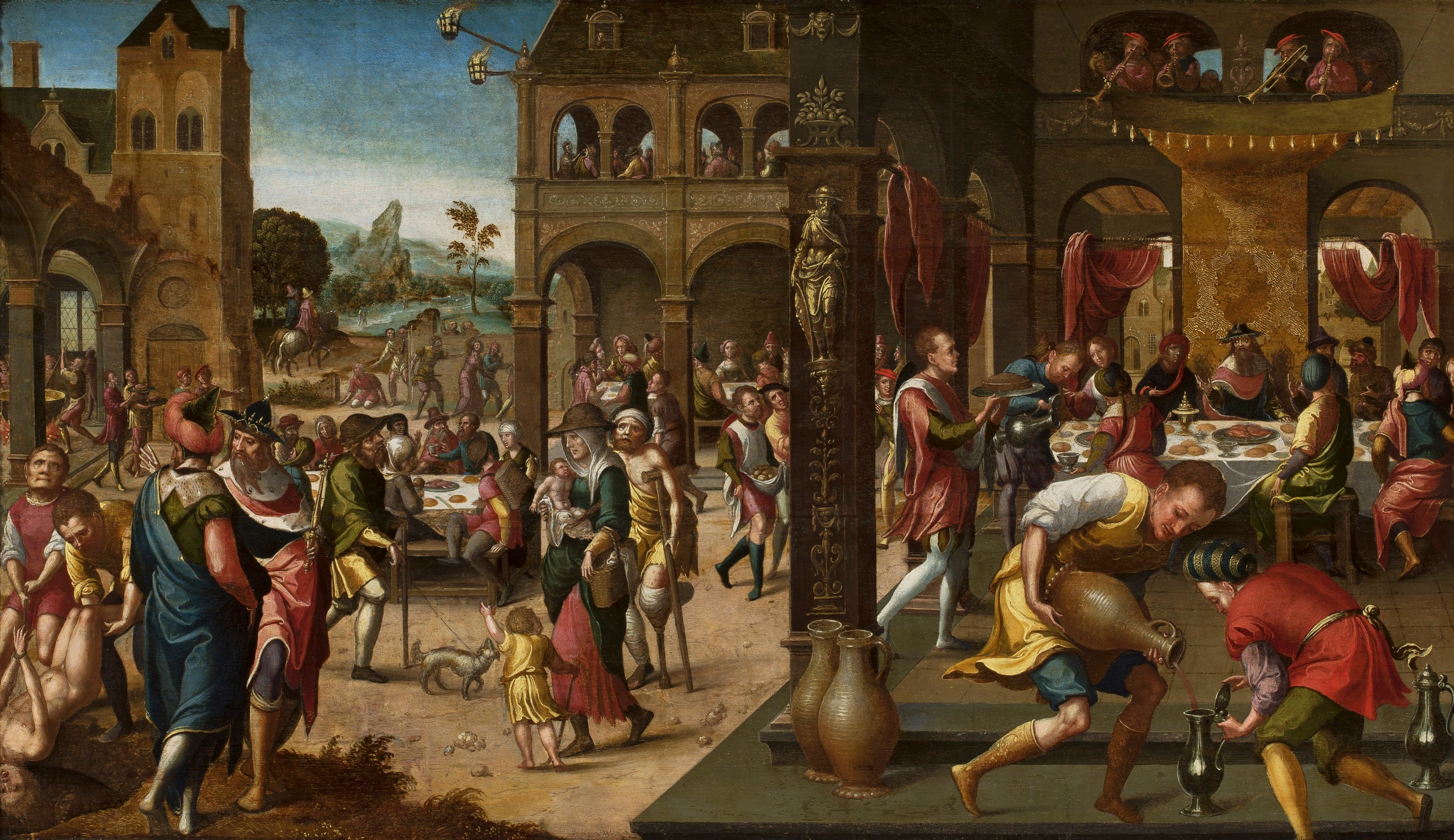
Parable of the Great Banquet by Brunswick Monogrammist (circa 1525), location: National Museum, Warsaw

The parable has been depicted by artists such as Bernardo Cavallino, Jan Luyken, and John Everett Millais.

A number of Christian hymns have been inspired by the parable, such as "All is ready" by Fanny Crosby, and "All Things are Ready" by Charles H. Gabriel, which begins:

"All things are ready," come to the feast!
Come, for the table now is spread;
Ye famishing, ye weary, come,
And thou shalt be richly fed.

== Music ==
The topic was the prescribed reading for the Second Sunday after Trinity and Twentieth Sunday after Trinity. For the first occasion Bach composed cantatas Die Himmel erzählen die Ehre Gottes, BWV 76 in 1723 and Ach Gott, vom Himmel sieh darein, BWV 2 in 1724. For the second occasion he wrote Schmücke dich, o liebe Seele, BWV 180 in 1724.

== See also ==
- Life of Jesus in the New Testament
- Luke 14
- Matthew 22
- Ministry of Jesus
- Parable of the Faithful Servant
- Parable of the Ten Virgins
- Parable of the Wedding Feast
