= Seudat nissuin =

Marriage supper in Judaism

A seudat nissuin (Hebrew, lit. 'wedding feast' or 'marriage supper') is a seudat mitzvah that observant Jews eat after a Jewish wedding. It is a mitzvah to have a joyful wedding reception.

== Order of the meal ==
Before the meal begins, the newlyweds are blessed. Next, the kosher wine and challah to be served are blessed. After the day's meal is over, Birkat Hamazon and Sheva Brachot are recited, and the newlyweds dance. A seudat nissuin typically lasts a week called a sheva brachot ('seven blessings') week. If the newlyweds were married before, the seudat nissuin lasts three days instead of seven, and the blessings are only recited after the first day's meal.

== Reference in the Bible ==
=== Old Testament ===
In Tobit 7:14, after marrying, Tobiah and Sarah "began to eat and drink" with their parents. Genesis 24:54 is also a possible reference to a seudat nissuin.

=== New Testament ===
In the New Testament, Jesus tells two parables about a seudat nissuin called the Parable of the Wedding Feast and the Parable of the Great Banquet. Jesus also attends the Wedding at Cana, turning water into kosher wine for the seudat nissuin. In Revelation 19:9, the Lamb of God is depicted holding a seudat nissuin.

== Reference in rabbinic literature ==
Adam in rabbinic literature enjoys a seudat nissuin with his wife Eve. Angels serve them the meal. After the meal, Adam and Eve dance with the angels. In Jewish eschatology, the messiah will hold a seudat nissuin with the righteous of every nation, called a Seudat Chiyat HaMatim, and they will feast on the cooked flesh of the Leviathan.

== Reference in Christian writings ==
In the Catechism of the Catholic Church, the Eucharist is called the wedding feast of the Lamb "where he gives his body and blood at the request of the Church, his Bride."

== See also ==
- Ancient Israelite cuisine
- Jewish cuisine
- Kashrut
