= Parable of the Wedding Feast =

Parable taught by Jesus of Nazareth according to the Gospel of Luke

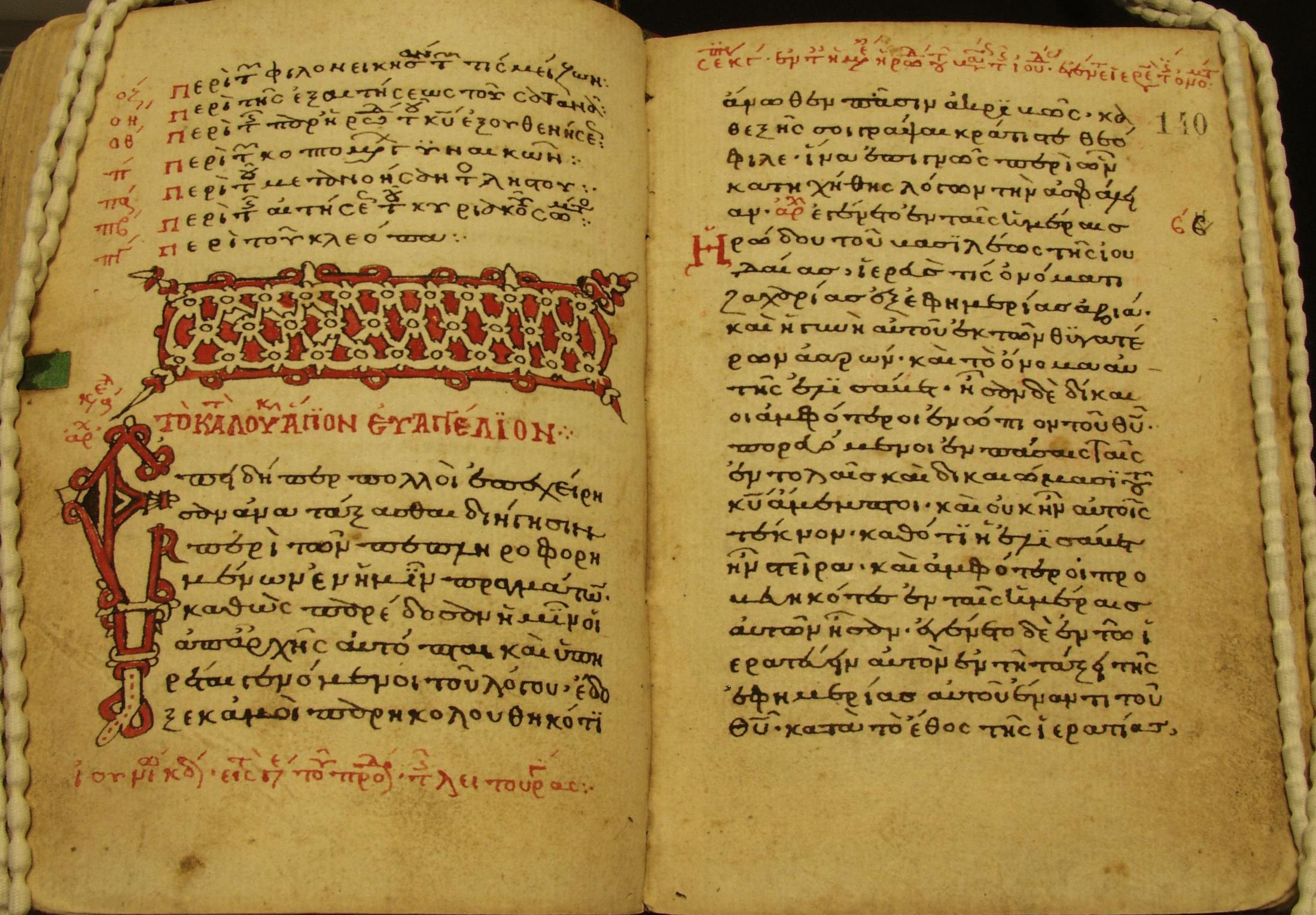
The Gospel of Luke, Minuscule 2444, 13th century

The Parable of the Wedding Feast is one of the parables of Jesus and appears in the New Testament in Luke 14:7–14. It directly precedes the Parable of the Great Banquet in Luke 14:15–24. In the Gospel of Matthew, the parallel passage to the Gospel of Luke's Parable of the Great Banquet is also set as a wedding feast (Matthew 22:1–14).

In New Testament times, a wedding was a very sacred and joyous thing. Some even lasted up to or more than a week. When Jesus told this parable, many people were able to understand the picture he was trying to create because he used a Jewish wedding – specifically, a Seudat Nissuin – as the setting of the story.

Luke 14:11 says "Every one that exalteth himself shall be humbled; but he that humbleth himself shall be exalted"; this saying is also found in Luke 18:14 and Matthew 23:12. It is similar to Matthew 18:4.

== Narrative ==
He spoke a parable to those who were invited, when he noticed how they chose the best seats, and said to them, "When you are invited by anyone to a marriage feast, don't sit in the best seat, since perhaps someone more honorable than you might be invited by him, and he who invited both of you would come and tell you, 'Make room for this person'. Then you would begin, with shame, to take the lowest place. But when you are invited, go and sit in the lowest place, so that when he who invited you comes, he may tell you, 'Friend, move up higher.' Then you will be honored in the presence of all who sit at the table with you. For everyone who exalts himself will be humbled, and whoever humbles himself will be exalted."

He also said to the one who had invited him, "When you make a dinner or a supper, don't call your friends, nor your brothers, nor your kinsmen, nor rich neighbors, or perhaps they might also return the favor, and pay you back. But when you make a feast, ask the poor, the maimed, the lame, or the blind; and you will be blessed, because they don't have the resources to repay you. For you will be repaid in the resurrection of the righteous."

— Luke 14:7–14, World English Bible

== Commentary ==
Bede notes that in practice, "not every one who exalts himself before men is abased; nor is he who humbleth himself in their sight, exalted by them". So the parable must be "understood typically".

The German theologian Friedrich Justus Knecht (d. 1921) gives the typical Catholic interpretation of this parable:

The king signifies God the Father; and therefore his son is the Son of God, our Lord Jesus Christ. The bride is the Church, and the marriage-feast is our Lord's spiritual union with the Church: the invited guests are those who are called to believe. Those who accept the invitation are those who are spiritually united to our Lord, and who have a share in the treasures of His grace. Those guests who were first invited are the Jews, who were called by God's servants (i. e. His prophets down to St. John the Baptist) to prepare themselves by penance for the coming of the Messiah. They did not obey the call; for a kingdom, the condition of belonging to which was penance, did not please them. Then God, when the work of Redemption was completed, and the Church founded, sent out other servants, namely His apostles and disciples, to warn the Jews that "all things were now ready", and that now was the time to enter His kingdom. But, sunk as they were in carnal notions, given over to avarice, pleasure-seeking and the love of dominion, the Jews had no relish for the idea of a kingdom of grace and salvation, and paid no heed to the urgent call; and many of them – the Scribes and Pharisees – persecuted, maltreated and killed God's servants for daring to deliver God's message. The apostles were imprisoned, scourged &c., and St. Stephen was stoned to death. Then Almighty God sent the Roman army to execute His judgments on the ungrateful people. The Romans killed a million of Jews and destroyed and burnt their city of Jerusalem. Then God sent His apostles among the Gentiles who had hitherto been wandering about, faithless and homeless, in the highways of the world, and invited them to the feast. These accepted His invitation, are still accepting it, and will go on doing so till, at the end of time, the Church is "filled with guests".

Roger Baxter in his Meditations, reflects on this passage, writing:

This king is our Heavenly Father, who has instituted a marriage between His only-begotton Son and human nature. The Son has espoused the Church in faith and charity, according to the expression of the Prophet, "I will espouse thee to Me in faith, and thou shalt know that I am the Lord." (Hos 2:20.) This same Lord espouses the souls of all the faithful, not those of the noble and the great only, but those of every one who will not reject Him. Acknowledge, O my soul, your exalted dignity, and behave yourself in a manner worthy of your spouse.

== See also ==
- Life of Jesus in the New Testament
- Luke 14
- Ministry of Jesus
- Parable of the Faithful Servant
- Parable of the great banquet
- Parable of the Ten Virgins
