= Parable of the Ten Virgins =

Parable of Jesus from the Gospel of Matthew

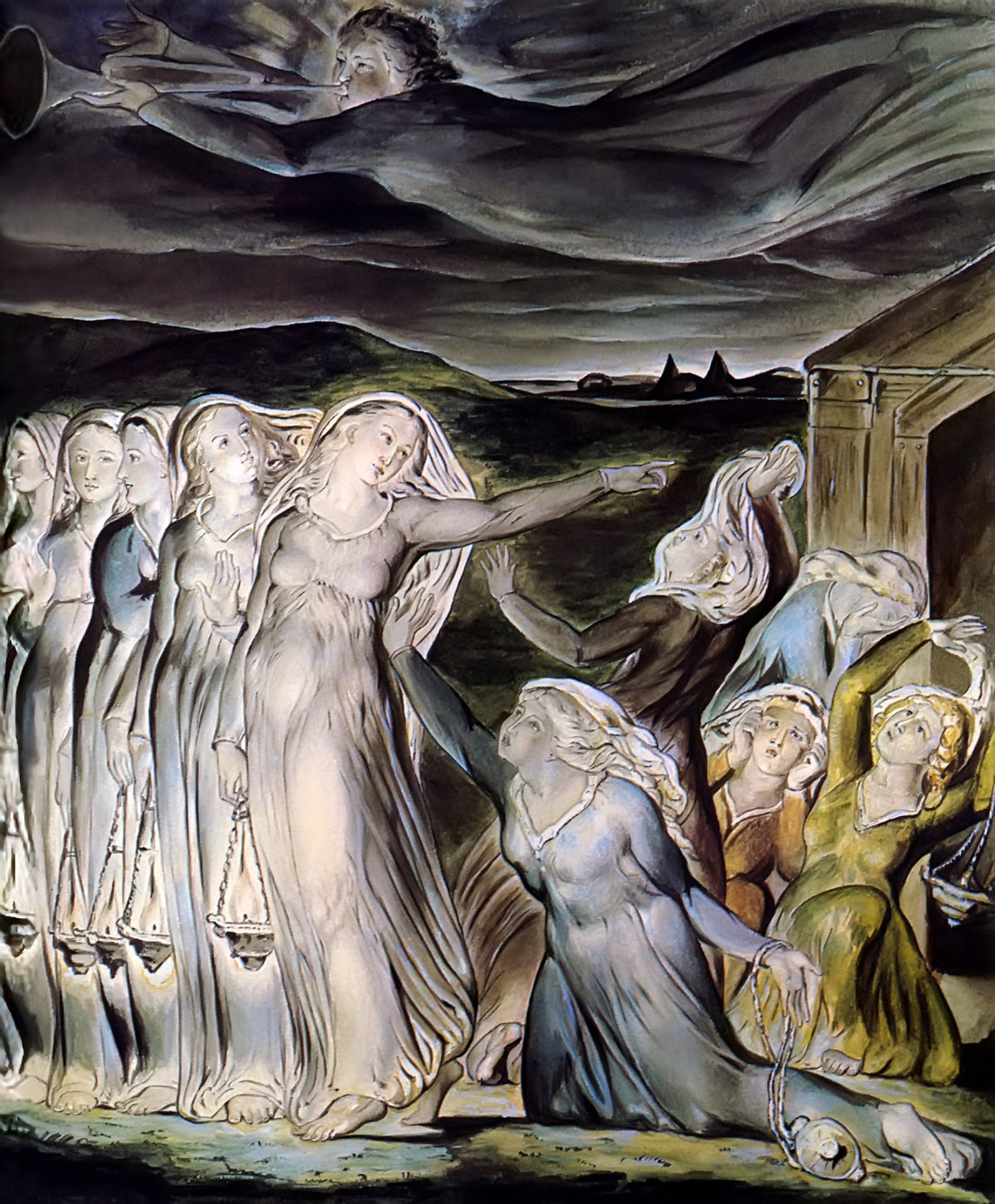
The Parable of the Wise and Foolish Virgins (1822) by William Blake, Tate Gallery

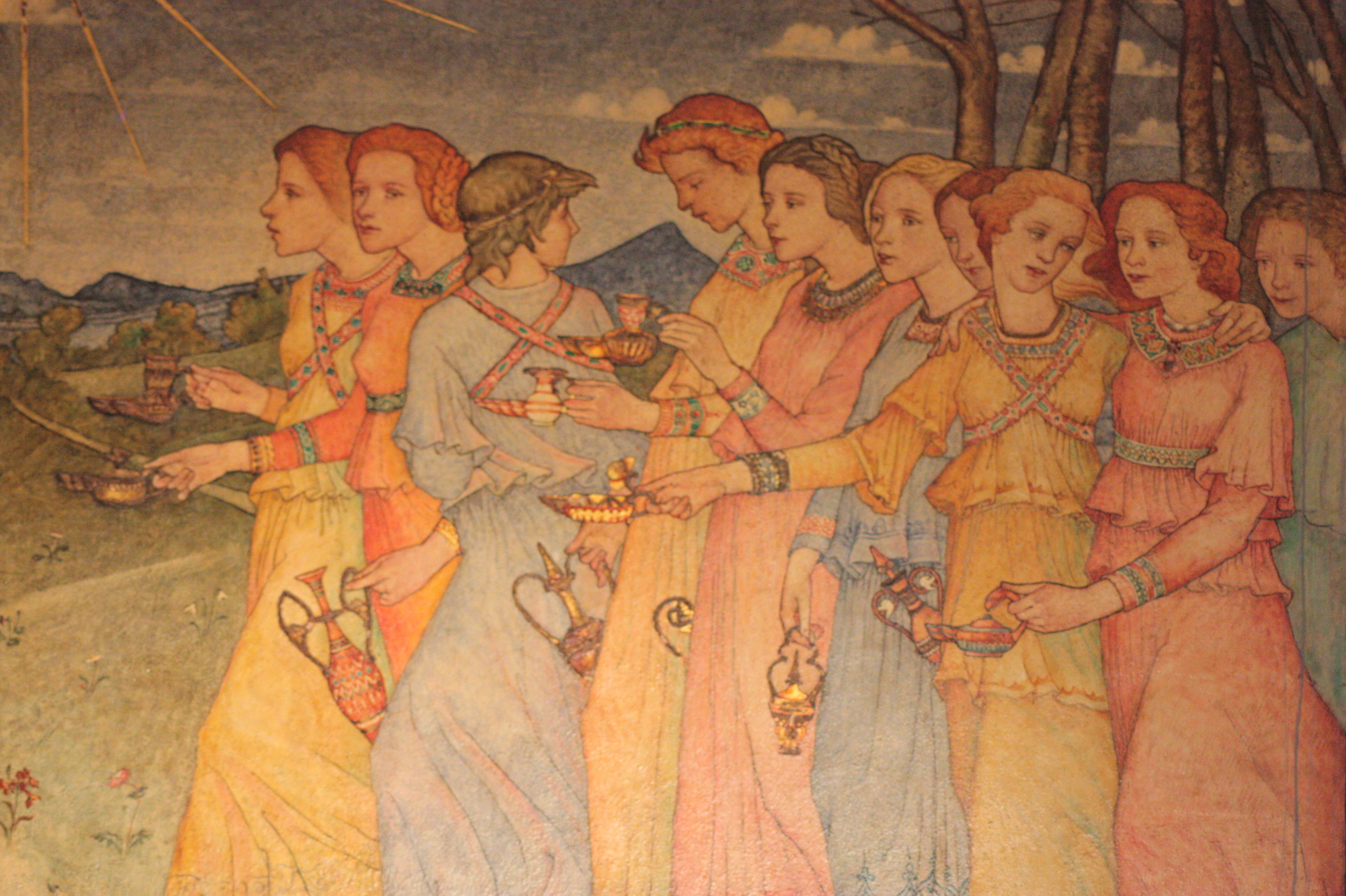
The Parable of the Ten Virgins (section) by Phoebe Traquair, Mansfield Traquair Church, Edinburgh

The Parable of the Ten Virgins, also known as the Parable of the Wise and Foolish Virgins or the Parable of the Ten Bridesmaids, is one of the parables of Jesus. According to Matthew 25:1–13, ten virgins await a bridegroom; five have brought enough oil for their lamps for the wait, while the oil of the other five runs out. The five virgins who are prepared for the bridegroom's arrival are rewarded, while the five who went to buy further oil miss the bridegroom's arrival and are disowned.

The parable has a clear eschatological theme: be prepared for the Day of Judgement. It was one of the most popular parables in the Middle Ages and had influence on Gothic art, sculpture and the architecture of German and French cathedrals.

== Narrative according to the Gospel of Matthew ==
In the Parable of the Ten Virgins, Jesus tells a story about a party of virgins, perhaps bridesmaids or torchbearers for a procession, chosen to participate in a wedding. Each of the ten virgins is carrying a lamp or torch as they await the coming of the bridegroom, which they expect at some time during the night. Five of the virgins are wise and have brought extra oil for their lamps. Five are foolish and have brought their lamps but no extra oil.

At midnight, all the virgins hear the call to come out to meet the bridegroom. Realising their lamps are going out, the foolish virgins ask the wise ones for oil, but they refuse, saying that there will certainly not (Greek ou mē) be enough for them to share. While the foolish virgins are away trying to buy more oil, the bridegroom arrives. The wise virgins then accompany him to the celebration. The others arrive too late and are excluded from the event.

Then the Kingdom of Heaven will be like ten virgins, who took their lamps, and went out to meet the bridegroom. Five of them were foolish, and five were wise. Those who were foolish, when they took their lamps, took no oil with them, but the wise took oil in their vessels with their lamps. Now while the bridegroom delayed, they all slumbered and slept. But at midnight there was a cry, "Behold! The bridegroom is coming! Come out to meet him!" Then all those virgins arose, and trimmed their lamps. The foolish said to the wise, "Give us some of your oil, for our lamps are going out." But the wise answered, saying, "What if there isn't enough for us and you? You go rather to those who sell, and buy for yourselves." While they went away to buy, the bridegroom came, and those who were ready went in with him to the marriage feast, and the door was shut. Afterward the other virgins also came, saying, "Lord, Lord, open to us." But he answered, "Most certainly I tell you, I don't know you." Watch therefore, for you don't know the day nor the hour in which the Son of Man is coming.

— Matthew 25:1–13, World English Bible

== Interpretations ==
The parable is one of a sequence of responses to a question in Matthew 24:

And as he sat upon the mount of Olives, the disciples came unto him privately, saying, tell us, when shall these things be? And what shall be the sign of thy coming, and of the end of the world?

— Matthew 24:3, King James Version

Other parables in this sequence include the Parable of the Budding Fig Tree (Matthew 24:32–35) and the Parable of the Faithful Servant (Matthew 24:42–51). The Parable of the Ten Virgins reinforces the call for readiness in the face of the uncertain time of the Second Coming. It has been described as a "watching parable". Like the Parable of the Lost Coin, it is a parable about women which immediately follows, and makes the same point as, a preceding parable about men. (Note: The parable of the Lost Coin follows the parable of the Lost Sheep and this parable follows the parable of the Faithful Servant.)

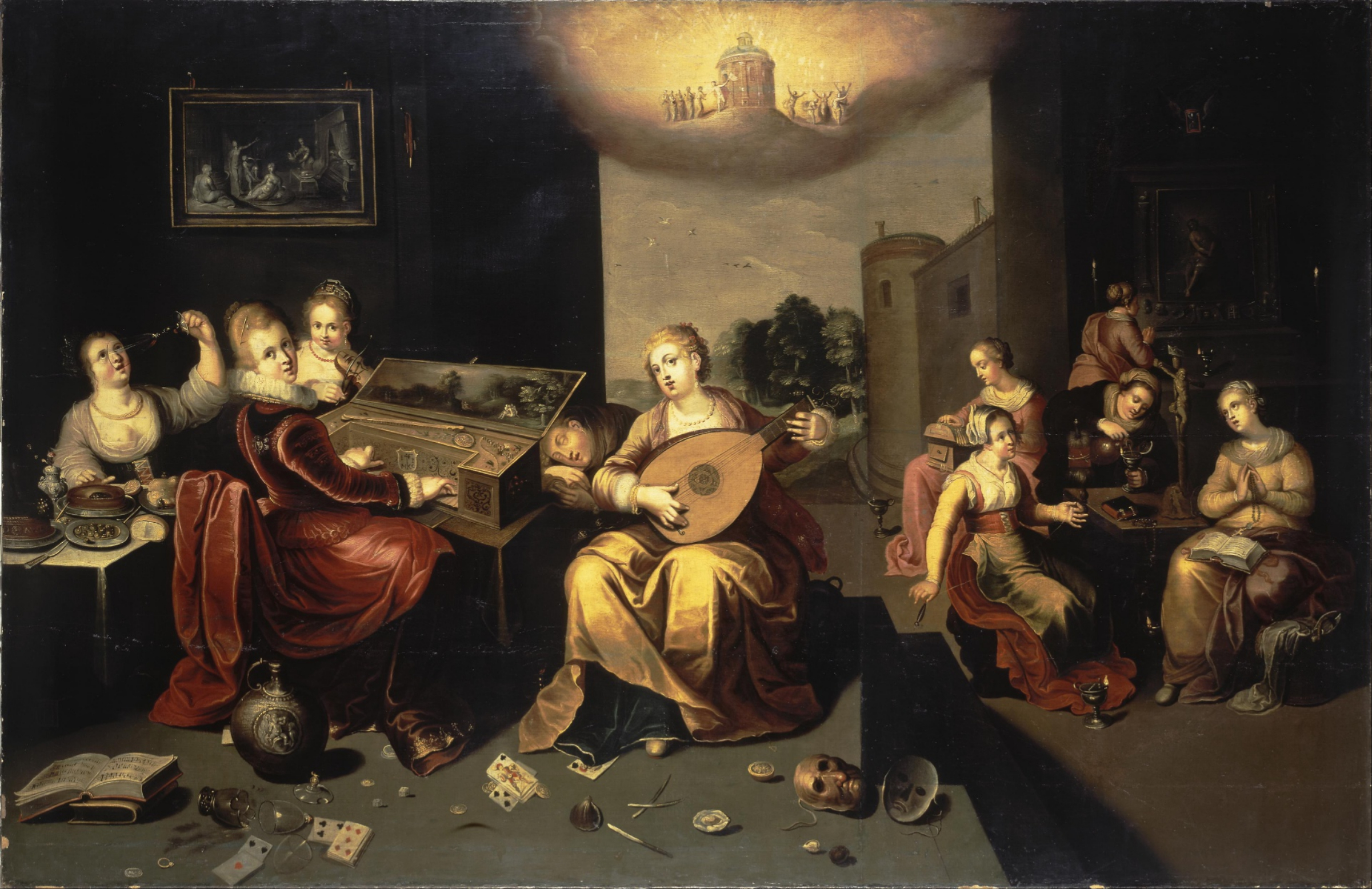
This painting by Hieronymus Francken the Younger (c. 1616) gives a moralistic interpretation of the parable.

Along with most early Christian interpreters of this parable, some today continue to understand it as an allegory, whereby Jesus Christ is the bridegroom, echoing the Old Testament image of God as the bridegroom in Jeremiah 2:2 and similar passages, and the virgins are the Christians. The awaited event is the Second Coming of Christ. Other elements in the story, e.g., lamps, oil, delay of the bridegroom, and exclusion of the foolish virgins from the celebration, also often take on various meanings. R. T. France writes that the parable is "a warning addressed specifically to those inside the professing church who are not to assume that their future is unconditionally assured."

This story in its present form in Matthew seems to be an allegory, at least in its implied identification of the bridegroom as the Son of Man (cf. 24:44) and reflection of the church’s experience of delay in his Parousia – although not a full-blown allegory like the Parable of the Sower, where almost every detail of the story has a hidden meaning. It has been argued that its original form, possibly on the lips of Jesus himself, was likely a narrative parable that simply illustrated the contrasting outcomes of groups who prepared themselves for uncertain circumstances and those who did not.

The parable does not criticise the virgins for sleeping, since both groups do that, but for being unprepared as they brought no extra oil. It is unclear as to whether the foolish virgins succeed in purchasing any oil that night: most shops would not have been open. The New Testament scholar, Dan O. Via, considers the story of the bridesmaids as an example of a tragic parable with an inverted U-shaped plot. The rising action of the parable is the preparation for the coming of the bridegroom, but a crisis occurs when the bridegroom is delayed. This is the turning point (reversal or peripety) that leads to disaster.

The parable is not written in praise of virginity, and indeed Louis of Granada, in The Sinner's Guide of 1555, writes "No one makes intercession with the Bridegroom for the five foolish virgins who, after despising the pleasures of the flesh and stifling in their hearts the fire of concupiscence, nay, after observing the great counsel of virginity, neglected the precept of humility and became inflated with pride on account of their virginity."

=== Catholic ===
Friedrich Justus Knecht wrote that this parable shows "the necessity of good works", with the spare oil symbolizing good works stored up by faithful Christians, and the lax Christians being those whose faith did not compel them to active love or good deeds.

Jesuit Roger Baxter writes in his Meditations for Every Day in the Year:

In the Church militant there are both good and bad, wise and foolish, all expecting the coming of Christ the spouse of the Church, in order to celebrate His nuptials in heaven. Those that keep their faith without charity, which is the life of faith, are like the foolish virgins who had no oil in their lamps, What can be more unwise than to expect the coming of a judge who sees all things, and not to prepare against His coming?"

=== Eastern Orthodox ===
St. Seraphim of Sarov's interpretation of this parable occurs in his famous conversation called "Acquisition of the Holy Spirit" in which he said, "Some say that the lack of oil in the lamps of the foolish virgins means a lack of good deeds in their lifetime. Such an interpretation is not quite correct. Why should they be lacking in good deeds, if they are called virgins, even though foolish ones? Virginity is the supreme virtue, an angelic state, and it could take the place of all other good works. I think that what they were lacking was the grace of the All-Holy Spirit of God. These virgins practiced the virtues, but in their spiritual ignorance they supposed that the Christian life consisted merely in doing good works. By doing a good deed they thought they were doing the work of God, but they cared little whether they acquired the grace of God's Spirit. These ways of life, based merely on doing good, without carefully testing whether they bring the grace of the Spirit of God, are mentioned in the patristic books: 'There is another way which is deemed good in the beginning, but ends at the bottom of hell.'"

=== Latter-day Saints ===
Spencer W. Kimball gave an LDS perspective on the difference between the wise and the foolish virgins, and why they could not share the oil: "This was not selfishness or unkindness. The kind of oil that is needed to illuminate the way and light up the darkness is not shareable. How can one share obedience to the principle of tithing; a mind at peace from righteous living; an accumulation of knowledge? How can one share faith or testimony? How can one share attitudes or chastity.... Each must obtain that kind of oil for himself."

== Authenticity ==
The parable occurs in all ancient New Testament manuscripts of the Gospel of Matthew, with only slight variations in some words. Bible commentators and scholars do not entirely agree on the nature of the parable: whether it is an authentic parable of Jesus, based on an authentic parable but significantly modified, or entirely an invention of the early Church. According to Jan Lambrecht, "a considerable number of exegetes in fact suppose that the parable of 'The Wise and Foolish Virgins' ultimately goes back to Jesus." Other scholars believe that this parable has only been lightly edited.

The argument for modification is due to the parable's eschatological nature, which seems to speak more directly to the situation of the early Church rather than the situation during Jesus's life (Sitz im Leben). A large majority of fellows on the Jesus Seminar, for example, designated the parable as merely similar to something Jesus might have said or simply inauthentic ("grey" or "black"). Bart Ehrman wrote that the parable makes sense within the context of the Church during the time period before the Gospel of Matthew was written, around 60–90 AD. Many early Christians believed the Second Coming of Jesus and the establishment of the Kingdom of God was imminent, yet this did not occur. In the parable, the bridegroom has been "delayed". The parable is thus an encouragement to keep watch and stay prepared for Christians who expected Jesus to have already returned.

== Liturgical use ==
In the Catholic Church, the parable is the Gospel reading for the 32nd Sunday in Ordinary Time in Cycle A; in the extraordinary form of the Roman rite (Tridentine Mass), the parable is the Gospel reading for Masses of virgins and virgin martyrs.

In the Armenian Orthodox Church the parable is the main theme of Holy Monday. A special Church service enacting the parable of the ten virgins is celebrated on Tuesday evening of the Holy Week.

In the Syriac Orthodox Church, the parable is used to commemorate the Sunday vespers service of Naheere. They believe Naheere symbolizes living in accordance with the 10 virgins, and that only through a life of dedication, vigilance, fasting and prayer can we be ready for the Bridegroom himself.

The parable is the Gospel reading for the 27th Sunday after Trinity in the traditional Lutheran lectionary.

In the Revised Common Lectionary, the parable is read in Year A as the Gospel for Proper 27 (32nd Sunday in Ordinary Time; 24th Sunday After Pentecost).

== In the arts ==
This parable has been a popular subject for painting, sculpture, music, and drama.

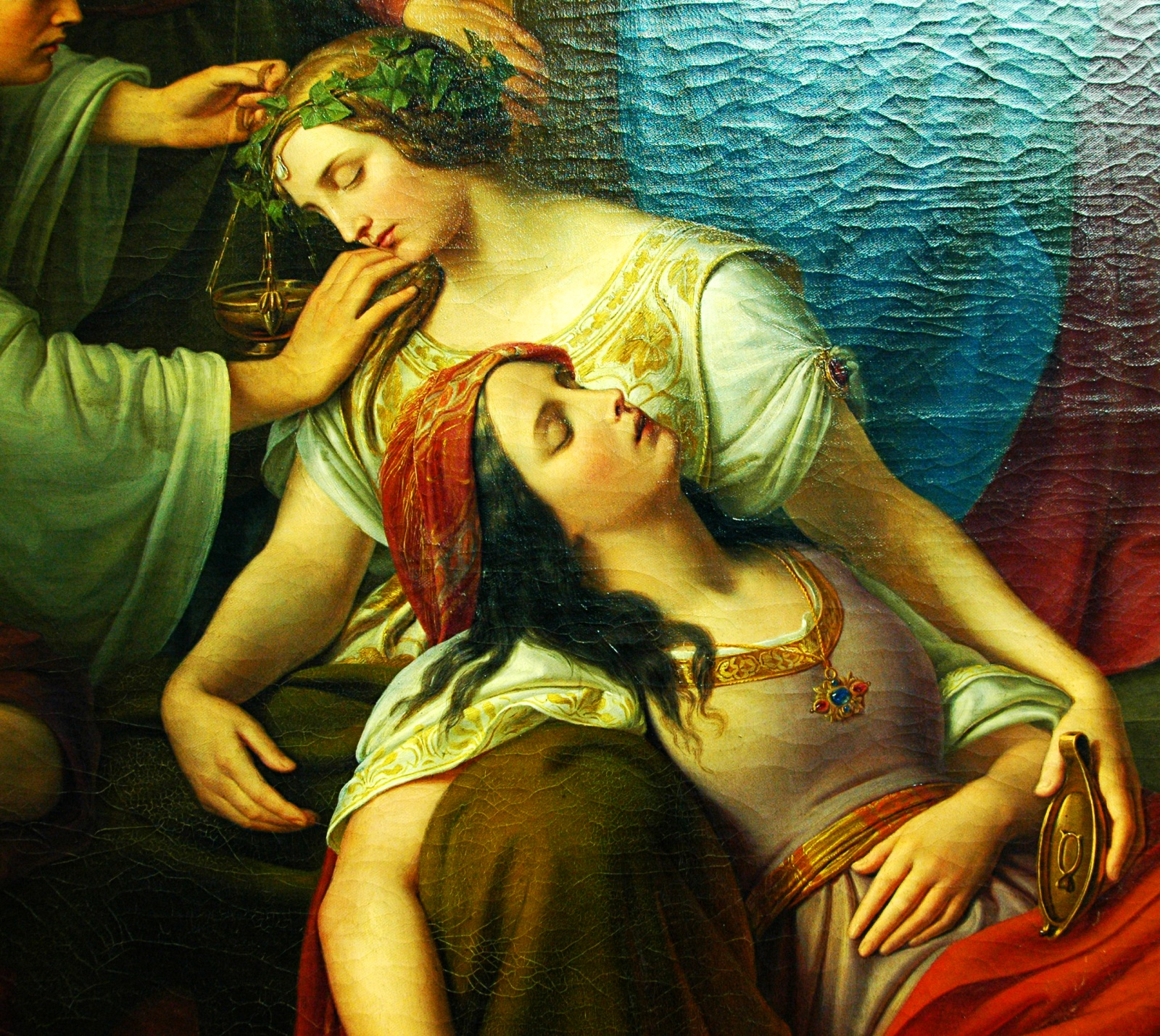
Friedrich Wilhelm Schadow, The Parable of the Wise and Foolish Virgins, 1838–1842 (detail), Städel Museum, Frankfurt am Main

=== Paintings and engravings ===
The parable has been depicted in several paintings, including altarpieces in Northern Europe. A recent example, from 1954, is by Tove Jansson. In the 19th century, the artists of the Nazarene movement also took up this theme.

An engraving titled "The Parable of the Wise and Foolish Virgins" is at the Metropolitan Museum of Art, which labels it "After Pieter Bruegel the Elder", "ca. 1560–63". In his novel Là-bas, Joris-Karl Huysmans describes the engraving and writes that Durtal, the novel's protagonist, "was extremely fond of this old engraving, appreciating both the domesticity of the scenes set on earth and the pious naivety, typical of the Primitives, of the heavenly ones".

=== Sculpture ===
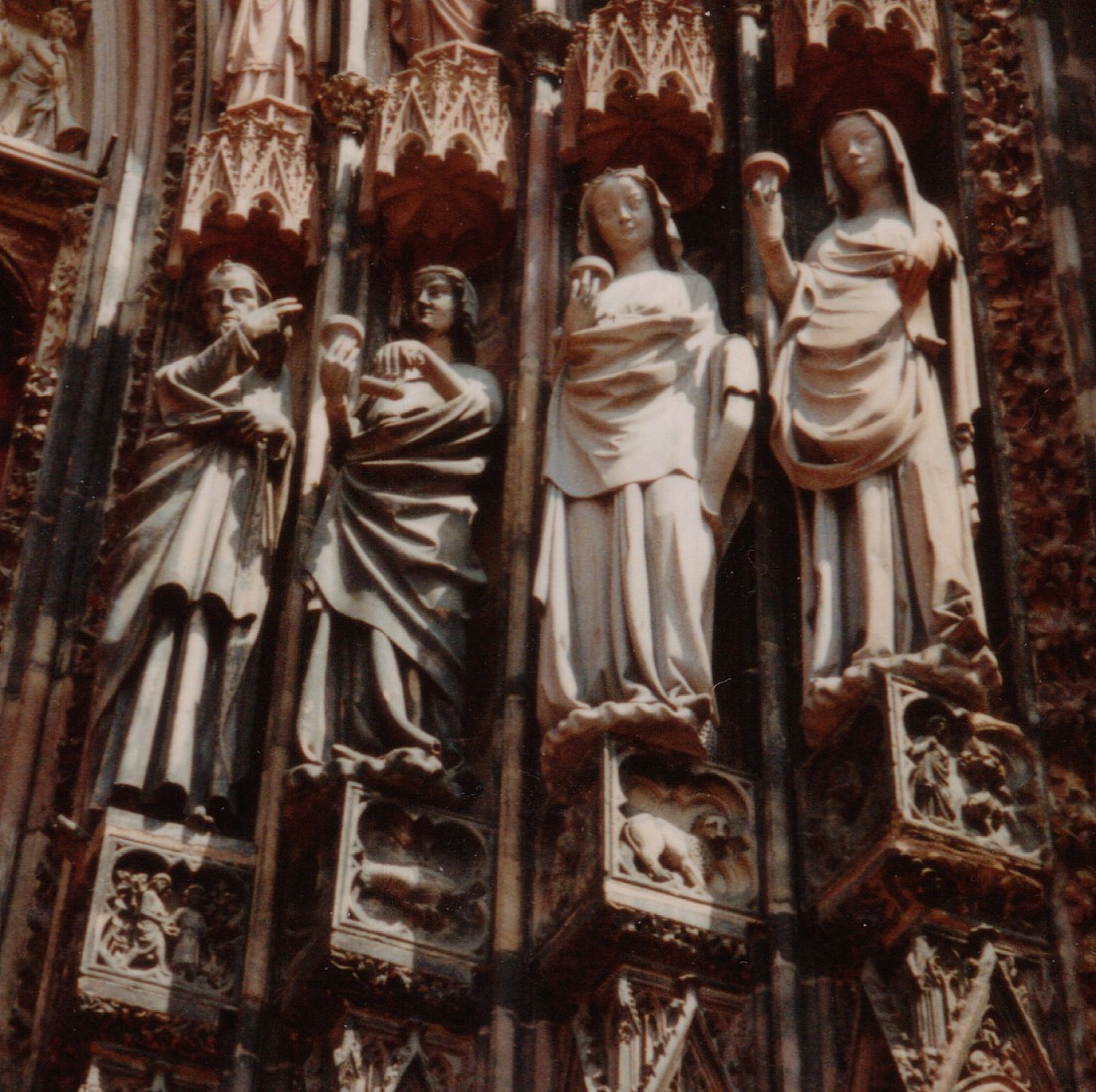
Three wise virgins appear with Christ on Strasbourg Cathedral.

Sculptures of the wise and foolish virgins were a common motif in medieval ecclesial architecture in Europe, especially for the decoration of doorways, and carved figures representing them appear on many of the medieval churches and cathedrals of the Gothic style, including:

- Amiens Cathedral
- Auxerre Cathedral
- Laon Cathedral
- Notre Dame de Paris
- Cathedral of Notre-Dame, Reims
- Strasbourg Cathedral
- Erfurt Cathedral
- Freiburg Minster
- Magdeburg Cathedral

The virgins are also depicted on cathedrals in Switzerland and other countries; the portal leading into the main church of Hovhannavank (1216-1221) in Armenia has carved scenes from the Parable of the Wise and Foolish Virgins.

The ubiquity of such sculptures has inspired a fictional description: the carvings on the doors of Kingsbridge cathedral in Ken Follett's novel World Without End, set in the Late Middle Ages.

=== Music ===
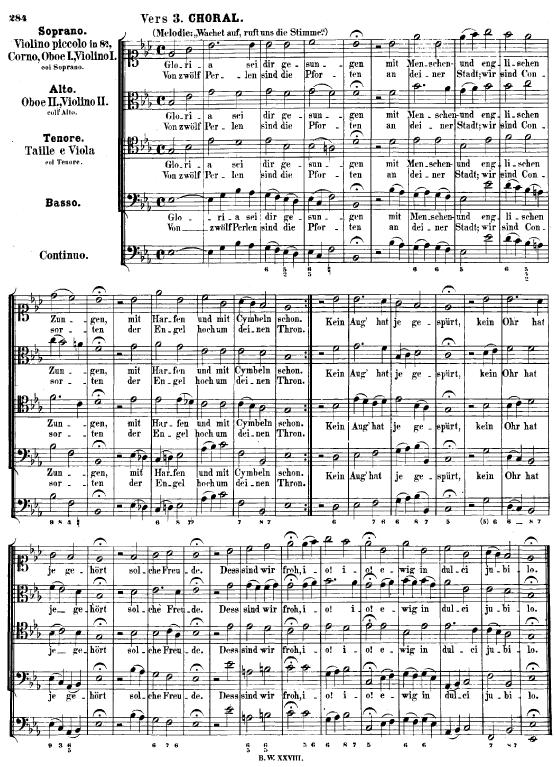
The third stanza of Wachet auf, ruft uns die Stimme, here as the final movement of Bach's chorale cantata

Several religious musical compositions have been inspired by the parable. Its message was formed into a hymn, "Wachet auf, ruft uns die Stimme", by Philipp Nicolai, which Johann Sebastian Bach used for his chorale cantata Wachet auf, ruft uns die Stimme, BWV 140. The parable forms the theme for other hymns as well, including the 19th-century hymn "Behold the Bridegroom Cometh" by George Frederick Root, which begins:

Our lamps are trimmed and burning,
Our robes are white and clean;
We’ve tarried for the Bridegroom,
Oh, may we enter in?

The Wise Virgins is a one-act ballet, written in 1941 by William Walton, based on the music of Johann Sebastian Bach, with choreography by Frederick Ashton.

"Keep Your Lamp Trimmed and Burning" is a gospel blues song based on the parable. It has been recorded by such artists as Blind Willie Johnson, Reverend Pearly Brown, and Rev. "Blind" Gary Davis.

Non-religious music has also used the parable as a theme, such as the ballet "The wise and the foolish virgins" by Swedish composer Kurt Atterberg (1887–1974), written in 1920.

A reference is made to the parable in the 2002 Johnny Cash song "The Man Comes Around", which draws heavily on the Bible.

On the 1974 album by Genesis—The Lamb Lies Down on Broadway—a reference to the parable is made in the song The Carpet Crawlers: "and the wise and foolish virgins giggle with their bodies glowing bright."

Judee Sill's 1973 song When the Bridegroom Comes poetically recounts the parable along with other references to Jesus' life and deeds: "Tho' the chosen are few, won't you tarry by your lamp till he calls for you? / And pray that your love endure till the bridegroom comes." The lyrics were written by her boyfriend at the time, the poet David Omer Bearden.

=== Drama ===
From early Christian times, the story of the ten virgins has been told as a mystery play. St Methodius wrote the Banquet of the Ten Virgins, a mystery play in Greek. Sponsus, a mid-11th-century play, was performed in both Latin and Occitan. The German play Ludus de decem virginibus was first performed on 4 May 1321. There was also a Dutch play of the late Middle Ages.

Bread and Puppet Theater Theater premiered their anti-war performance "Grey Lady Cantata #1" on February 2, 1967, in context of Angry Arts Week in New York City. The performance included 100 Grey Lady puppets as the virgins (representing Vietnamese civilians, slain by military forces during the invasion in Vietnam), whose spirits are resurrected by their faith. During the puppet performance, the Judson Chamber Ensemble performed Wachet auf, ruft uns die Stimme, BWV 140.

== See also ==
- Bride of Christ
- Life of Jesus in the New Testament
- Matthew 25
- Ministry of Jesus
- Lamp under a bushel
- Parable of the Faithful Servant
- Parable of the Great Banquet
- Parable of the Wedding Feast
- Wachet auf, ruft uns die Stimme, BWV 140
- Ecclesia and Synagoga
