= Naheere =

Religious practice of Syriac Orthodox Church

Naheere, commonly known as "Entrance to Heaven", is a practice in the Syriac Orthodox Church which includes a church sermon. It is celebrated on the eve of Monday during Holy Week (evening of Palm Sunday). The word 'Naheere" is Syriac (a dialect of Middle Aramaic) for light; the idea behind the practice is that, if one asks Jesus into one's heart, Jesus comes in and shows one the light, and one is accepted by his grace into heaven.

One of the things that the service centers around is the Parable of the Ten Virgins. This was told by Jesus to explain the entrance concept. Some Syriac prayers, which tell this story, are said.

== Church experience ==
The church lights are off; the only light is from candles held by the congregation. The priest, the deacons and the altar boys do the sermon by the pews because the altar is "closed". After prayers in Syriac, telling of the parable as well as Jesus wandering in the desert, the sermon begins to close. Then the priest shouts thrice: moran, moran ftah lan tar3okh "O Lord, O Lord, open Thy door for us," after which the lights in the church are turned on and simultaneously the curtain is opened.

== Prayers (common - from Syriac Orthodox resources) ==
=== Qolo: Mshiho Natareh Lcidtokh ===
Our Savior spoke in parables and proverbs.

He said that the Kingdom of Heaven is like the virgins;

Those who took the lamps and went out

To meet the bridegroom and the bride.

They all became drowsy and slept.

At midnight there was a shout,

"The bridegroom has arrived."

The wise ones entered with him,

And the foolish ones remained outside the door,

Crying and wailing, which no words can describe.

Listen via YouTube

=== Qolo: Btarcokh Moran Noqeshno ===
At Your door, O Lord, I knock,

And From Your treasury I ask for mercies.

I am a constant sinner and have turned aside from Your way.

Grant me to confess and renounce my sins,

And to live in Your grace.

At whose door, other than Yours,

Shall we knock, O Gracious Lord?

Whom do we have to plead with You on behalf of our transgressions,

If Your own mercy pleads not?

O King, Whom the kings worship and glorify.
