= Sheva Brachot =

Seven blessings recited at a Jewish wedding

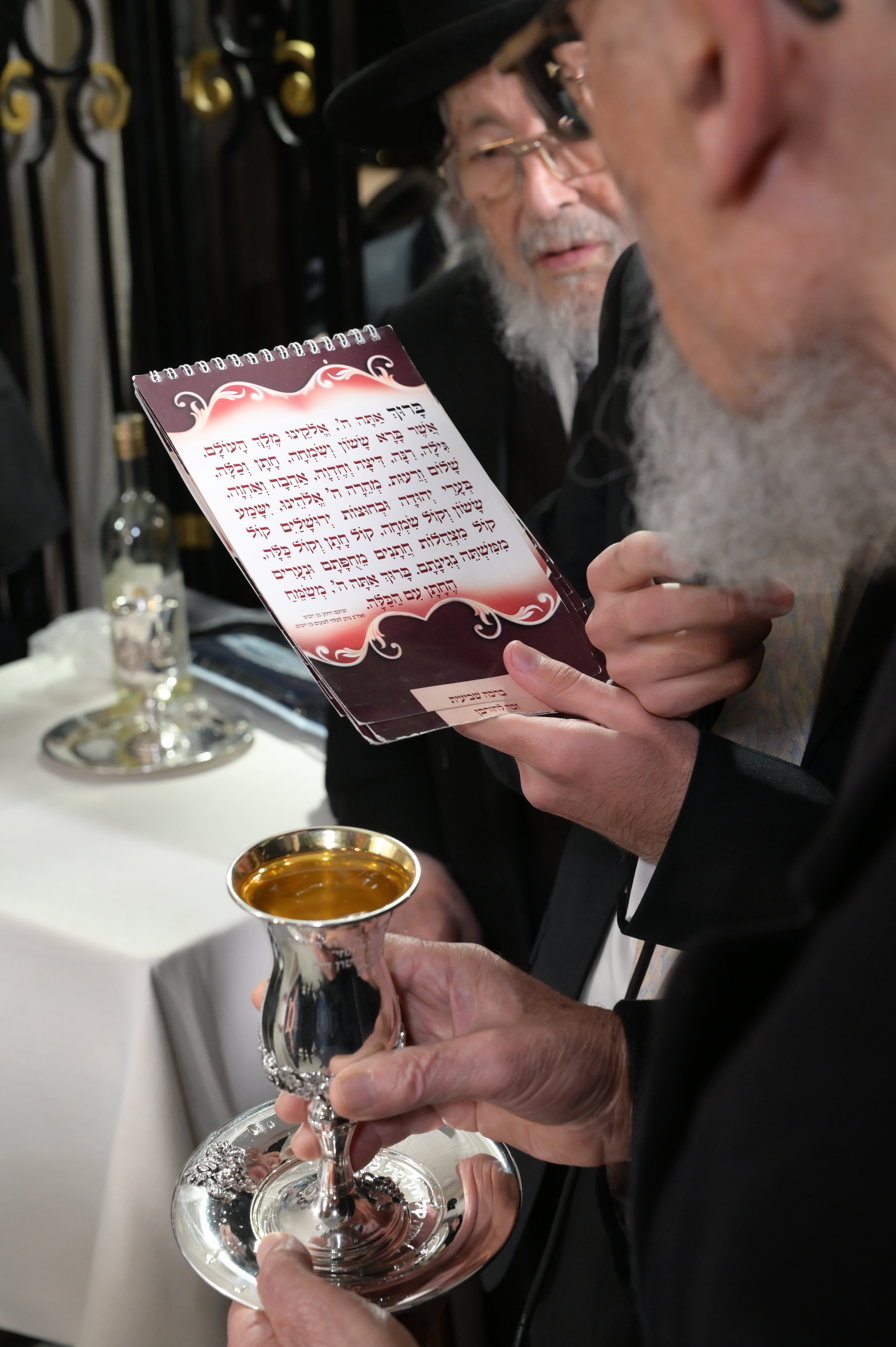

Sheva Brachot (Hebrew: שבע ברכות; literally, "the seven blessings"), also known as birkot nissuin (Hebrew: ברכות נישואין; literally, "the wedding blessings") in Halakha, are blessings that have historically been recited during the wedding of a Jewish couple. There are two stages to a Jewish wedding: betrothal (erusin) and establishing the full marriage (nissuin). Historically, there was a year between the two events, but the two are combined during contemporary Jewish wedding ceremonies. Although the Sheva Brachot are recorded and recited as a harmonious unit, the blessings are actually a mosaic of Biblical origination. It is uncertain who composed the benedictions in the form recorded in the Talmud, but the blessings likely originated centuries before their inclusion in tractate Ketubot.

== Occasion ==
In the seventh century, it was traditional for the blessings to be said at the groom's house, and at the house where the bride had spent the night previous to the marriage; this is still the tradition among Jews in some parts of Asia, but in most regions the wedding blessings are now recited towards the end of the formal marriage ceremony, under the chuppah.

These blessing are also recited as part of the week-long festivities celebrating the wedding; in most communities these festive meals occur during the week after the wedding, but among the Mountain Jews they occur during the week before it. Under the chuppah the blessing over wine comes first; at the meal table it comes last, after the Grace After Meals. If both the bride and the groom were previously married the post wedding celebrations are limited to three days, not seven. In such a case, the blessings are recited only after the very first festive meal, which should take place right after the wedding.

In Orthodox Judaism, the first six of the blessings are said only if a religiously valid quorum is present. On weekdays their recitation also requires the presence of at least one person who was not present for any of the previous Sheva Brachot of the couple. At the two main meals on Shabbat (but not at Seuda Shelishit) there is no need for a new guest, since the Shabbat itself is considered a new guest. New guests are referred to as new faces (Hebrew: פנים חדשות).

=== Yemenite Jewish custom ===
The Yemenite Jewish custom regarding the Sheva Brachot is recorded in Yiḥyah Salaḥ's Responsa. The custom that was prevalent in Sanaa before the Mawza Exile (1679-80) was to say the Sheva Brachot for the bridegroom and bride on a Friday morning, following the couple's wedding the day before, even though she had not slept in the house of her newly wedded husband. In Yemenite custom, the bride was brought to her husband's house only on the following day of their wedding. On Friday (erev Shabbat), they would pitch a large tent within a garden called al-Jawza, replete with pillows and cushions, and there, on the next day (Shabbat afternoon), they would repeat the seven benedictions for the bridegroom and bride, followed by prayer inside the tent, before they were dismissed to eat of their third Sabbath meal. At that time, some accompanied the bridegroom to his own house to eat with him there. The significance of this practice, according to Maharitz, was that they made the seven blessings even when not eating in that place, a practice which differs from today's custom.

== Performance ==
It is a common custom for these blessings to be pronounced by a Hazzan or Rabbi, if they presided over the marriage, or otherwise for pronunciation of the blessings to be divided among honoured guests. Sometimes, the blessings are sung by the wedding guests en-masse.

The blessings are usually said over a cup of wine. If multiple people say the blessings, the cup is passed to the person pronouncing each blessing. In many traditions, when a person pronounces the blessing, they and/or the groom drinks from the cup, either after each blessing, or just after all seven.

== The wording ==
The text for Sheva B'rachot varies between Sephardic and Azhkenazic Jews, but may even vary from community to community. The standardized Ashkenazic is below, with an Egyptian Sephardic textual variant being inserted in parentheses ().

#	Hebrew	Transliteration	English
1	ברוך אתה יי אלהינו מלך העולם, בורא פרי הגפן.	Barukh atah Adonai Eloheinu melekh ha‑olam, bo'rei p'ri ha-gafen (ha-gefen).	Blessed are You, LORD, our God, sovereign of the universe, Creator of the vine-fruit.
2	ברוך אתה יי אלהינו מלך העולם, שהכל ברא לכבודו.	Barukh atah Adonai Eloheinu melekh ha‑olam shehakol bara lichvodo.	Blessed are You, LORD, our God, sovereign of the universe, who created everything for His Glory.
3	ברוך אתה יי אלהינו מלך העולם, יוצר האדם.	Barukh atah Adonai Eloheinu melekh ha‑olam, yotzer ha-adam.	Blessed are You, LORD, our God, sovereign of the universe, Creator of man.
4	ברוך אתה יי אלהינו מלך העולם, אשר יצר את האדם בצלמו, בצלם דמות תבניתו, והתקין לו ממנו בניין עדי עד. ברוך אתה יי, יוצר האדם.	Barukh atah Adonai Eloheinu melekh ha‑olam, asher yatzar et ha-adam b’tzalmo, b’tzelem d’mut tavnito, v’hitkin lo mimenu binyan adei ad. Baruch atah Adonai, yotzeir ha-adam.	Blessed are You, LORD, our God, sovereign of the universe, who created man in your image*, fashioning perpetuated life. Blessed are You, LORD, Creator of man.
5	שוש תשיש ותגל העקרה, בקיבוץ בניה לתוכה בשמחה (במהרה). ברוך אתה יי, משמח ציון בבניה.	Sos tasis v’tageil ha-akara b’kibutz baneha l’tocha b’simcha. Baruch atah Adonai, m’sameach Tzion b’vaneha.	The barren one will surely exult and be glad in gathering her children to herself joyfully (in haste). Blessed are You, LORD, Gladdener of Zion by way of her children.
6	שמח תשמח רעים האהובים, כשמחך יצירך בגן עדן מקדם. ברוך אתה יי, משמח חתן וכלה.	Sameiach tesamach reiim ha-ahuvim k’sameichacha y’tzircha b’gan eden mikedem. Baruch ata Adonai, m’sameiach chatan v’chalah.	Loving companions will surely gladden, as you gladdened your creations in the Garden of Eden in the east. Blessed are You, LORD, Gladdener of groom and bride.
7	ברוך אתה יי אלהינו מלך העולם, אשר ברא ששון ושמחה, חתן וכלה, גילה רינה, דיצה וחדווה, אהבה ואחווה, ושלום ורעות, מהרה ה' אלקינו ישמע בערי יהודה ובחוצות ירושלים, קול ששון וקול שמחה, קול חתן וקול כלה, קול מצהלות חתנים מחופתם (מצהלות חפות חתנים ממשתה), ונערים ממשתה (מ)נגינתם. ברוך אתה ה', משמח חתן עם הכלה.	Baruch atah Adonai Eloheinu melech ha-olam, asher bara sason v’simcha chatan v’kallah, gilah rinah ditzah v’chedvah, ahavah v’achavah v’shalom v’reut. M’hera Adonai Eloheinu yishammah b’arei Yhudah uv-chutzot Y’rushalayim kol sason v’kol simcha, kol chatan v’kol kalah, kol mitzhalot chatanim meichupatam u-n'arim mimishte n’ginatam. Baruch ata Adonai, m’sameiach chatan im hakalah.	Blessed are You, LORD, our God, sovereign of the universe, who created joy and gladness, groom and bride, mirth, song, delight and rejoicing, love and harmony and peace and companionship. Quickly, LORD our God, there should be heard in the cities of Judah and in the courtyards of Jerusalem the voice of joy and the voice of gladness, the voice of groom and the voice of bride, the jubilant voices of grooms from the bridal canopy, and of young people from the feast of their singing. Blessed are You, LORD, Gladdener of the groom with the bride.

== See also ==
- Jewish view of marriage
- List of Jewish prayers and blessings
