= Brunswick Monogrammist =

Anonymous Netherlandish painter

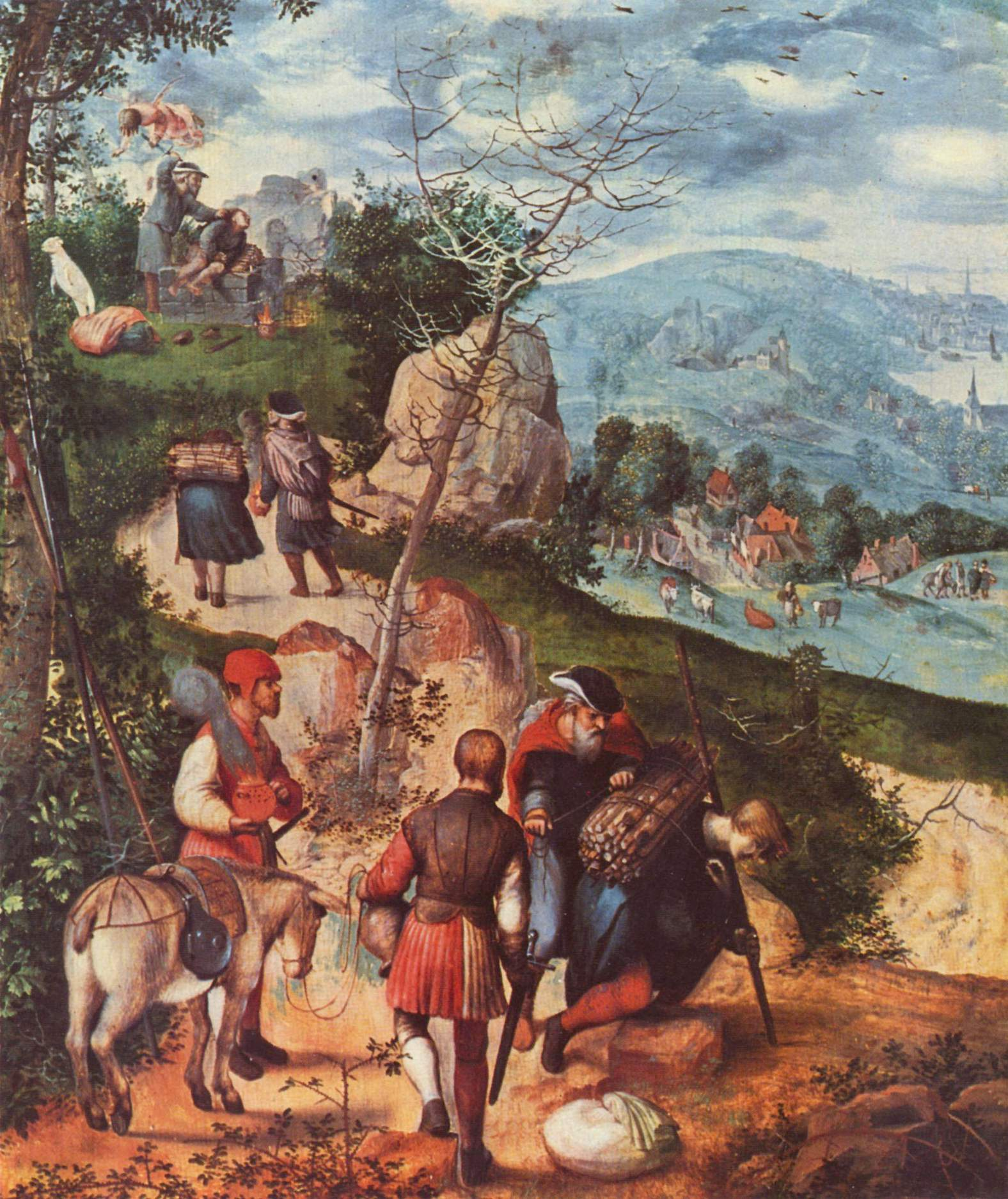
The Sacrifice of Isaac (2nd quarter of 16th century). Oil on wood, 40 × 32 cm. Louvre Museum, Paris

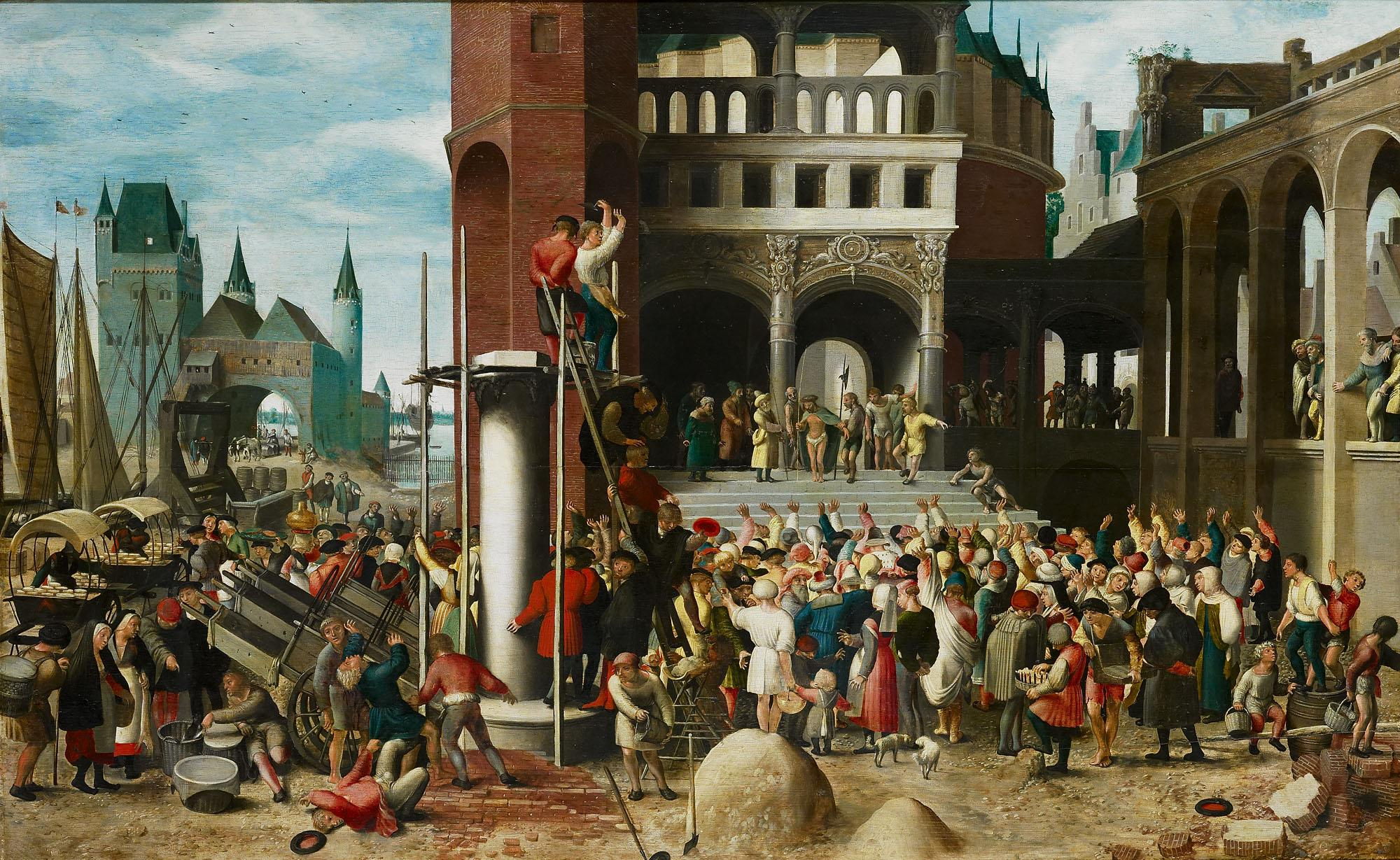
Ecce Homo

The Brunswick Monogrammist or Master of the Brunswick Monogram was an anonymous Netherlandish Renaissance painter, active in the mid-to-late 16th century. He (or she) painted religious scenes but also several scenes of secular merriment, including brothel and tavern scenes, and has been called "the most significant precursor of Pieter Bruegel the Elder".

== Identity ==
The monogram for which the Brunswick Monogrammist is named appears only once, on his (or her) Parable of the Great Supper in the Herzog Anton Ulrich Museum in Brunswick. It is composed of the interlocked letters J, V, A, M, S and L, and neither it nor careful analysis of his work have yielded consensus about his identity. His (or her, as Verhulst was female) paintings have been attributed to a number of painters, including Jan van Hemessen, Mayken Verhulst and Jan van Amstel.

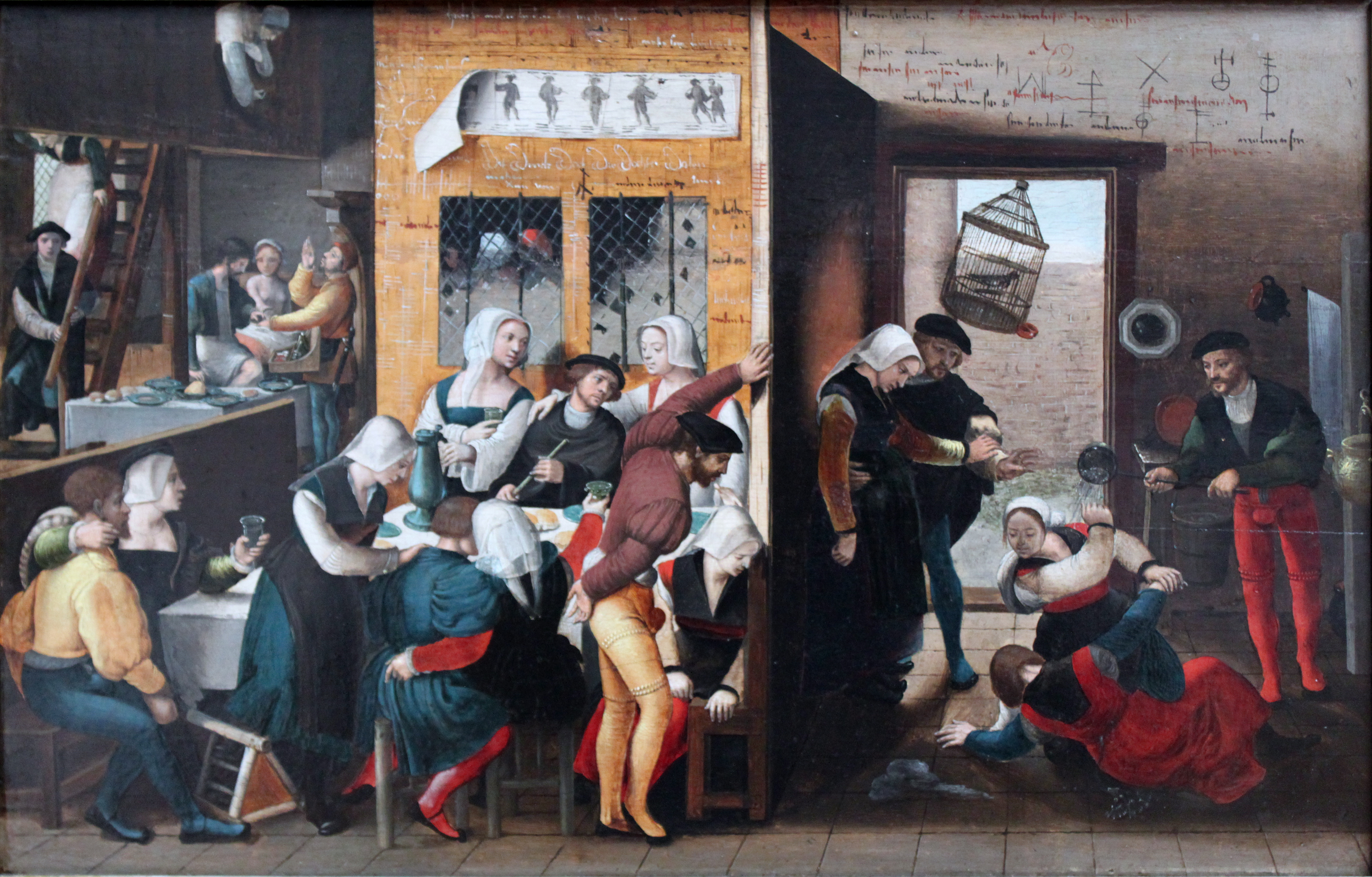
Brothel scene, 1537; Gemäldegalerie, Berlin

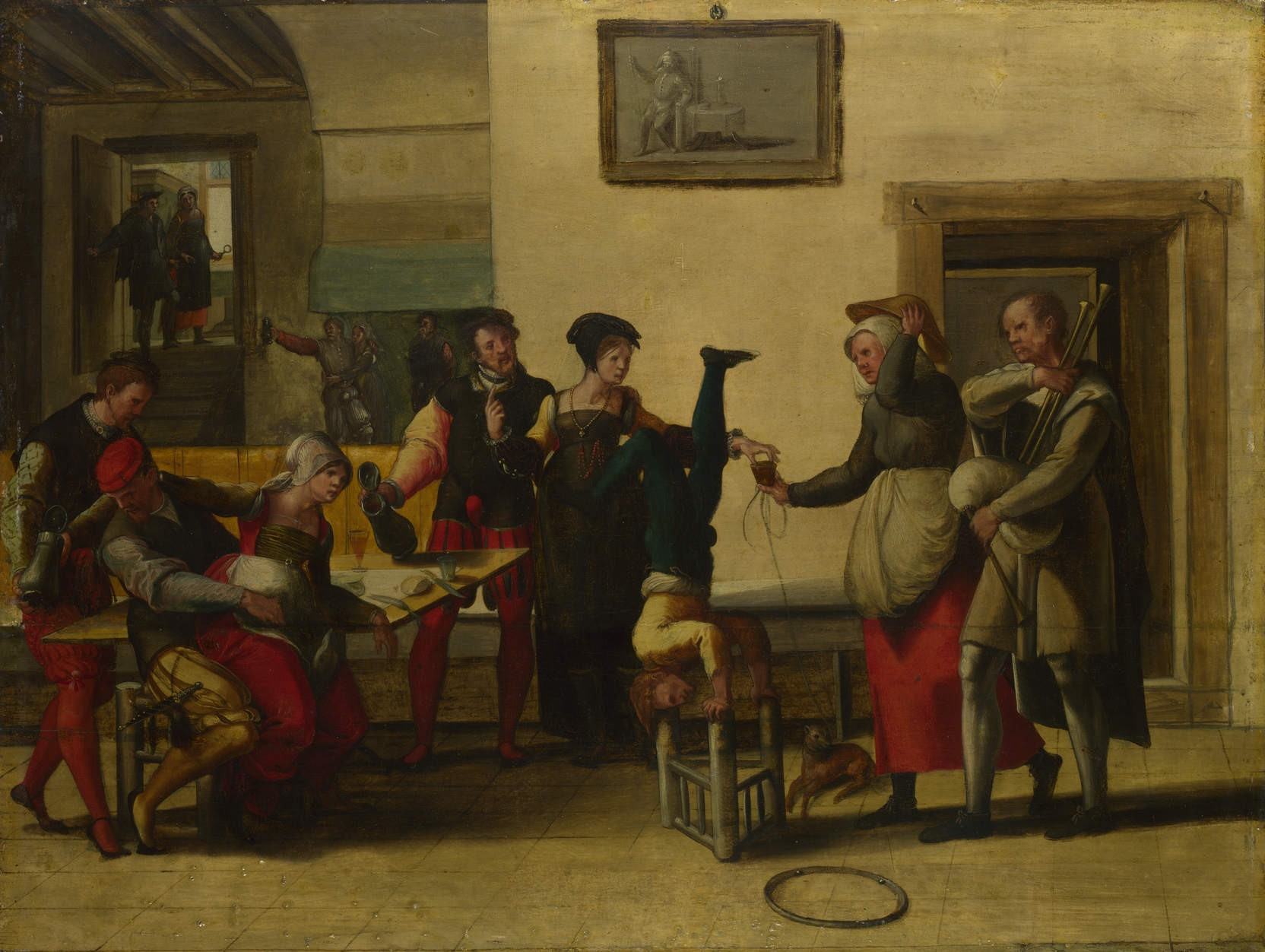
Itinerant Entertainers in a Brothel (1550s). Oil on wood, 45.5 cm × 60.7 cm. National Gallery, London

== Partial list of works ==
- A Brothel Scene (New Haven, Yale University Art Gallery)
- A Dispute in a Brothel (Sold in May 2007 at Christie's Amsterdam)
- St. John the Baptist Preaching in the Wilderness (Sold December 2005 at Christie's London)
- Ecce Homo (Amsterdam, Rijksmuseum)
- The Feeding of the Poor or Feeding of the Five Thousand or Parable of the Great Supper (Herzog Anton Ulrich-Mus.)
- Itinerant Entertainers in a Brothel (London, National Gallery)
- Tavern Scene (Berlin, Staatliche Museen Preussischer Kulturbesitz)
- Road to Calvary
- Brothel scene, 1537, Gemäldegalerie, Berlin

== See also ==
- Early Renaissance painting
- Renaissance in the Netherlands
