= Parable of the Faithful Servant =

Parable taught by Jesus of Nazareth according to Christian gospels

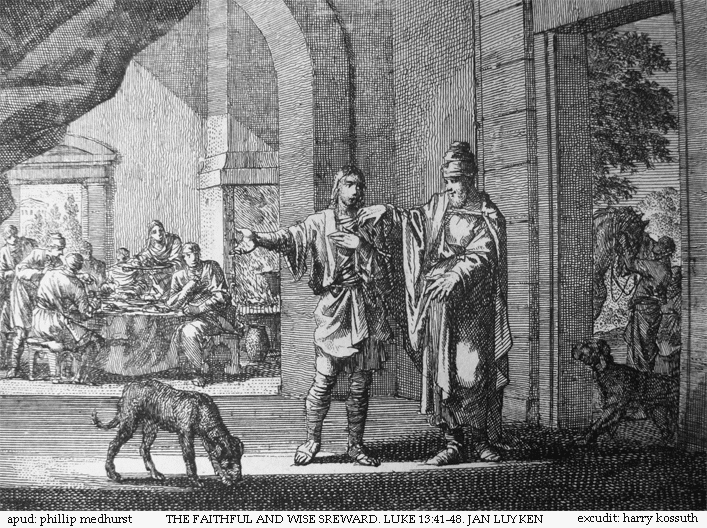
Etching by Jan Luyken illustrating the parable, from the Bowyer Bible.

The Parable of the Faithful Servant (or Parable of the Door Keeper) is a parable of Jesus found in Matthew 24:42-51, Mark 13:34-37, and Luke 12:35-48 about how it is important for the faithful to keep watch.

In Matthew's Gospel, it immediately precedes the Parable of the Ten Virgins, which has a similar eschatological theme of being prepared for the day of reckoning.

== Narrative ==
In Mark's Gospel, "the day and the hour", for which Jesus says his disciples must remain watchful, is compared to a man going to a far country who is to return at some point. This comparison forms the final exhortation in Mark's Gospel before the evangelist commences his narrative of Jesus' passion.

In Luke's Gospel, the parable reads as follows:

"Let your waist be dressed and your lamps burning. Be like men watching for their lord, when he returns from the marriage feast; that, when he comes and knocks, they may immediately open to him. Blessed are those servants, whom the lord will find watching when he comes. Most certainly I tell you, that he will dress himself, and make them recline, and will come and serve them. They will be blessed if he comes in the second or third watch, and finds them so. But know this, that if the master of the house had known in what hour the thief was coming, he would have watched, and not allowed his house to be broken into. Therefore be ready also, for the Son of Man is coming in an hour that you don't expect him."

Peter said to him, "Lord, are you telling this parable to us, or to everybody?"

The Lord said, "Who then is the faithful and wise steward, whom his lord will set over his household, to give them their portion of food at the right times? Blessed is that servant whom his lord will find doing so when he comes. Truly I tell you, that he will set him over all that he has. But if that servant says in his heart, 'My lord delays his coming,' and begins to beat the menservants and the maidservants, and to eat and drink, and to be drunken, then the lord of that servant will come in a day when he isn't expecting him, and in an hour that he doesn't know, and will cut him in two, and place his portion with the unfaithful. That servant, who knew his lord's will, and didn't prepare, nor do what he wanted, will be beaten with many stripes, but he who didn't know, and did things worthy of stripes, will be beaten with few stripes. To whomever much is given, of him will much be required; and to whom much was entrusted, of him more will be asked.

— Luke 12:35-48, World English Bible

== Interpretation ==
In Matthew, the parable opens with the injunction: "Therefore keep watch, because you do not know on what day your Lord will come" (Matthew 24:42). In other words, "the disciple must remain prepared for his Lord's coming, remaining alert and awake at his post." Even though there may be general signs that precede Jesus' Second Coming, the exact time is unknown. This is a theme which has also been discussed earlier in Luke 12. The reference to a wedding banquet in Luke 12:36 suggests a heavenly banquet, and recalls the Parable of the Ten Virgins, which follows this parable in Matthew.

The second part of the parable includes a caution that much more will be required of the person to whom much is given. J. Dwight Pentecost writes that this parable "emphasizes that privilege brings responsibility and that responsibility entails accountability." This applies particularly to religious leaders.

== Hymns ==
The parable is the theme for several hymns, including Philip Doddridge's "Ye Servants of the Lord," which ends:

Christ shall the banquet spread
With His own royal hand,
And raise that faithful servant’s
Amid the angelic band.

== See also ==
- Life of Jesus in the New Testament
- Ministry of Jesus
- Parable of the Master and Servant
- Parable of the great banquet
- Parable of the Wedding Feast
