= Jewish wedding =

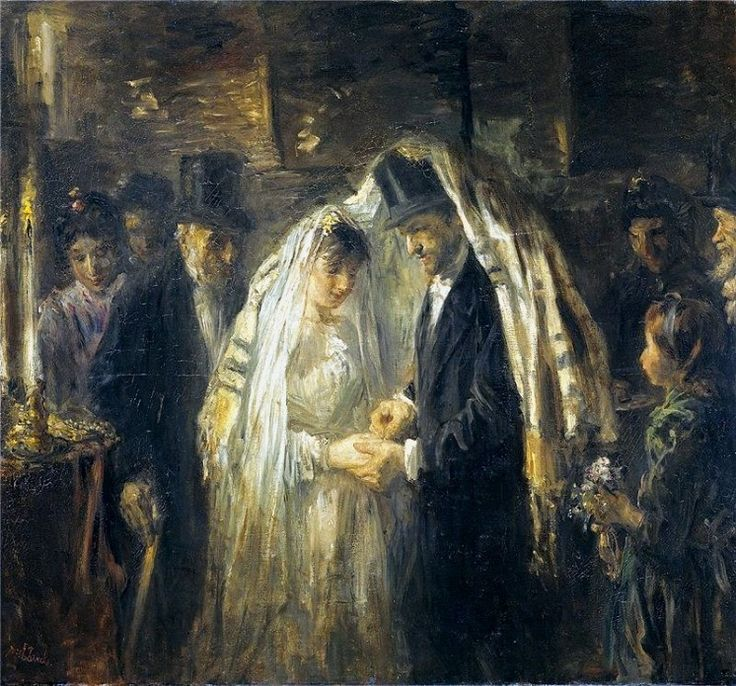
Jewish Wedding, painting by Jozef Israëls, 1903

A Jewish wedding is a wedding ceremony that follows Jewish laws and traditions. While wedding ceremonies vary, common features of a Jewish wedding include a ketubah (marriage contract) that is signed by two witnesses, a chuppah or huppah (wedding canopy), a ring owned by the groom that is given to the bride under the canopy, and the breaking of a glass.

Technically, the Jewish wedding process has two distinct stages. The first, kiddushin (Hebrew for "betrothal"; sanctification or dedication, also called erusin) and nissuin (marriage), is when the couple start their life together. It is at the first stage (kiddushin) when the woman becomes prohibited to all other men, requiring a get (religious divorce) to dissolve it, while the second stage permits the couple to each other. The ceremony that accomplishes nissuin is also known as chuppah.

Today, erusin/kiddushin occurs when the groom gives the bride a ring or other object of value with the intent of creating a marriage. There are differing opinions as to which part of the ceremony constitutes nissuin/chuppah, such as standing under the canopy and being alone together in a room (yichud). Erusin/kiddushin has evolved from a period in which the man was to prepare financially to marry his wife into becoming the first half of the wedding ceremony. While historically these two events could take place as much as a year apart, they are now commonly combined into one ceremony.

== Signing of the marriage contract ==
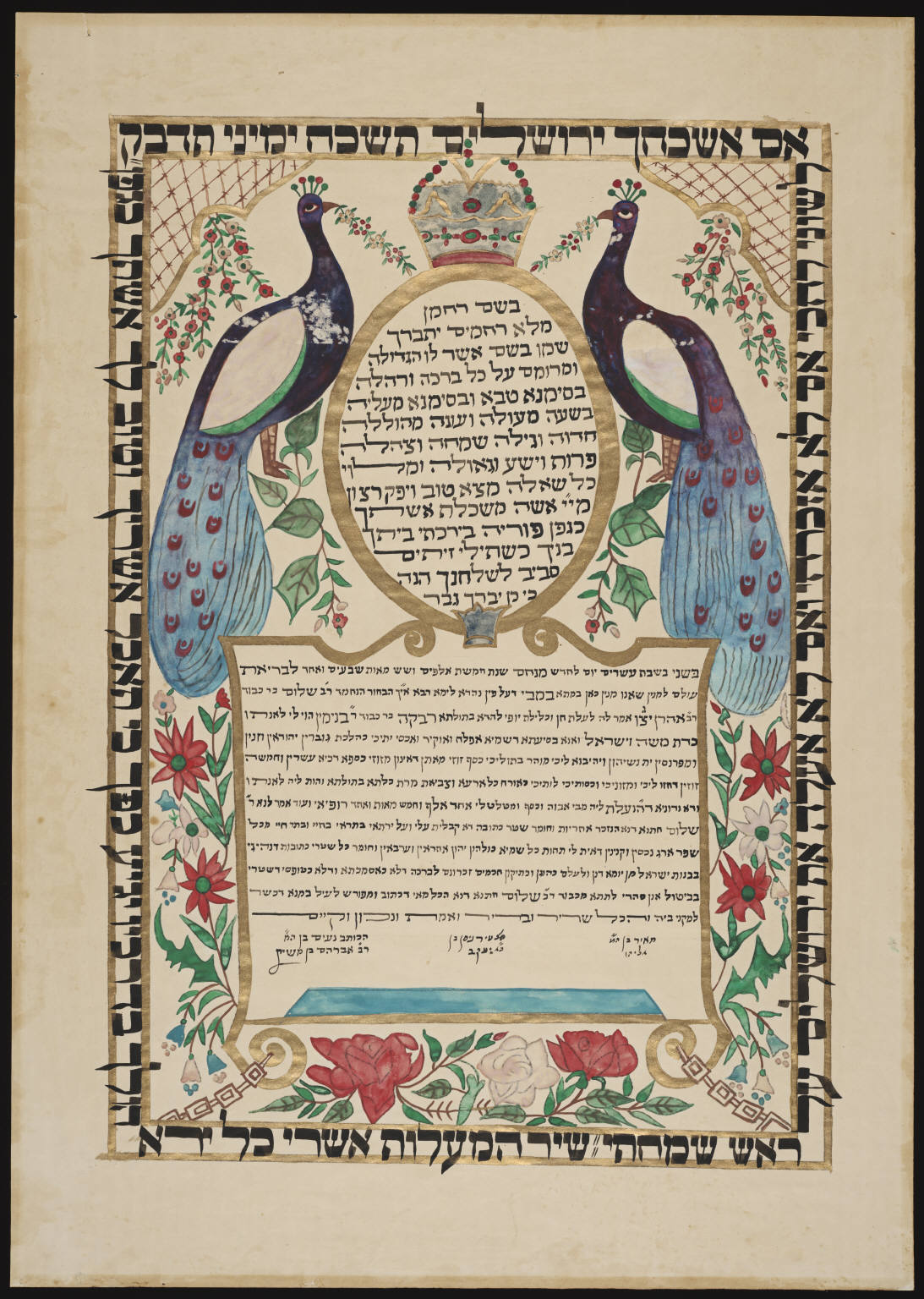
A decorated ketubah from Mumbai

Before the wedding ceremony, the groom agrees to be bound by the terms of the ketubah (marriage contract) in the presence of two witnesses, whereupon the witnesses sign the ketubah. Usually these two witnesses are not closely related to the couple, but family and friends will be present for the signing. The ketubah details the obligations of the groom to the bride, among which are food, clothing, and marital relations. This document has the standing of a legally binding agreement, though it may be hard to collect these amounts in a secular court. It is often written as an illuminated manuscript that is framed and displayed in their home. Under the chuppah, it is traditional to read the signed ketubah aloud, usually in the Aramaic original, but sometimes in translation. Traditionally, this is done to separate the two basic parts of the wedding. Non-Orthodox Jewish couples may opt for a bilingual ketubah, or for a shortened version to be read out.

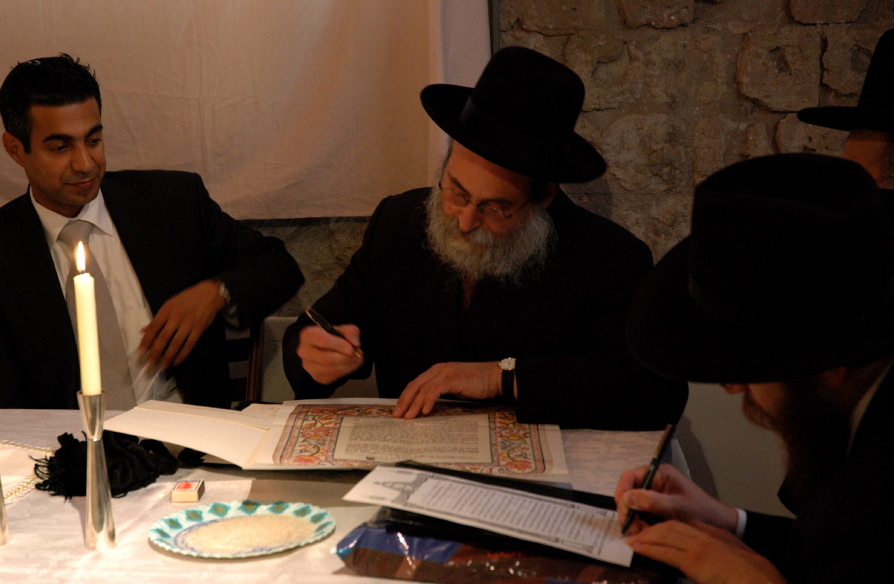
Signing of the ketubah (marriage contract)

== Bridal canopy ==
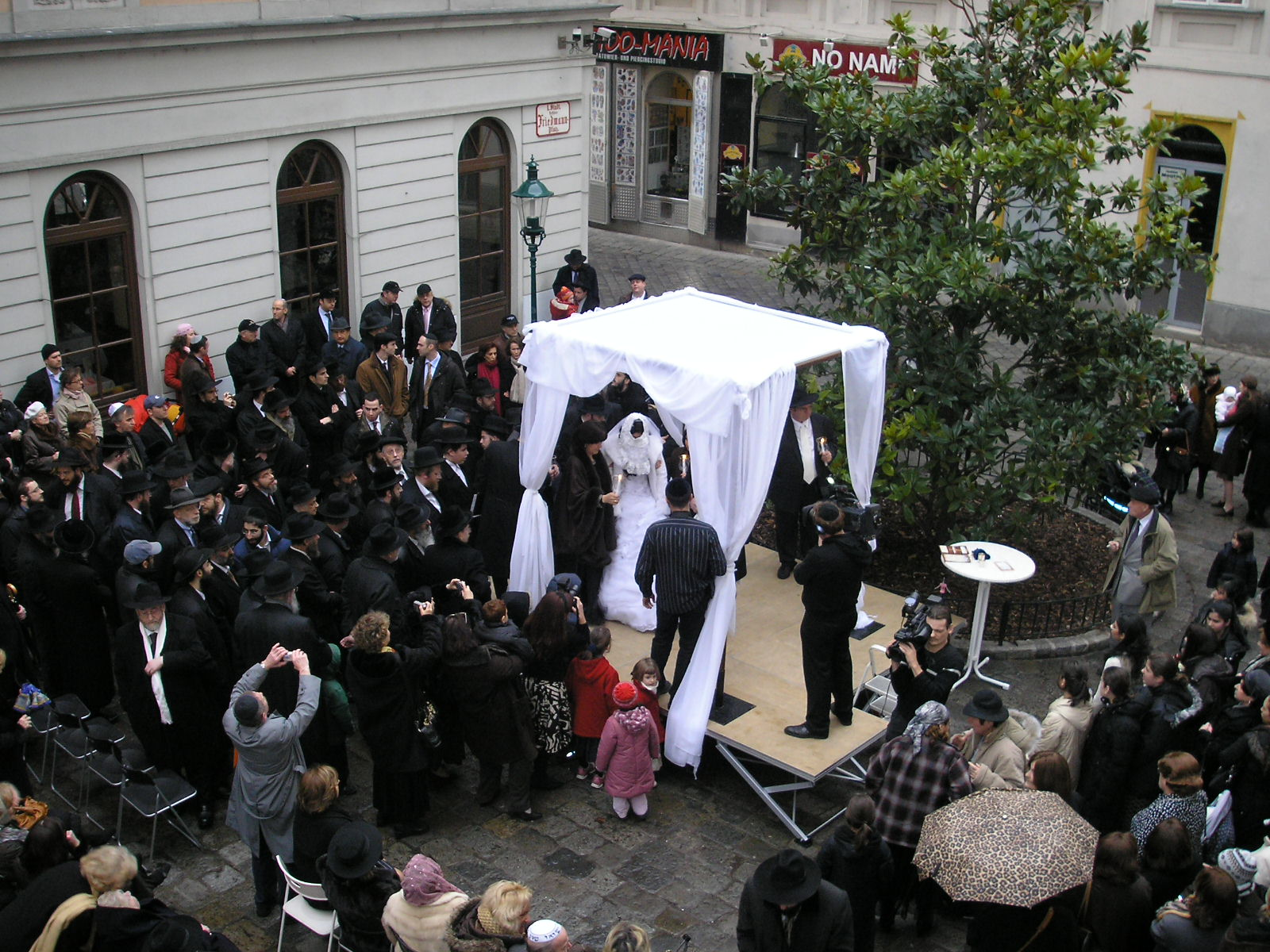
Outdoor Chuppah in Vienna, Austria

A traditional Jewish wedding ceremony takes place under a chuppah (wedding canopy), symbolizing the new home being built by the couple when they become husband and wife. This too, in Ashkenazi Jewish custom, was usually placed outdoors under an open sky. The chuppah used in Ashkenazi ceremonies includes a cloth canopy held up by four beams. This structure is meant to represent the home of the new couple and is traditionally standing under an open sky. While some Sephardic weddings will also include a chuppah of a cloth canopy and four beams, some weddings will use the tallit the groom wears as the chuppah. Once the ceremony concludes the groom will wrap the tallit around himself and his new wife, signifying their joining.

== Covering of the bride ==
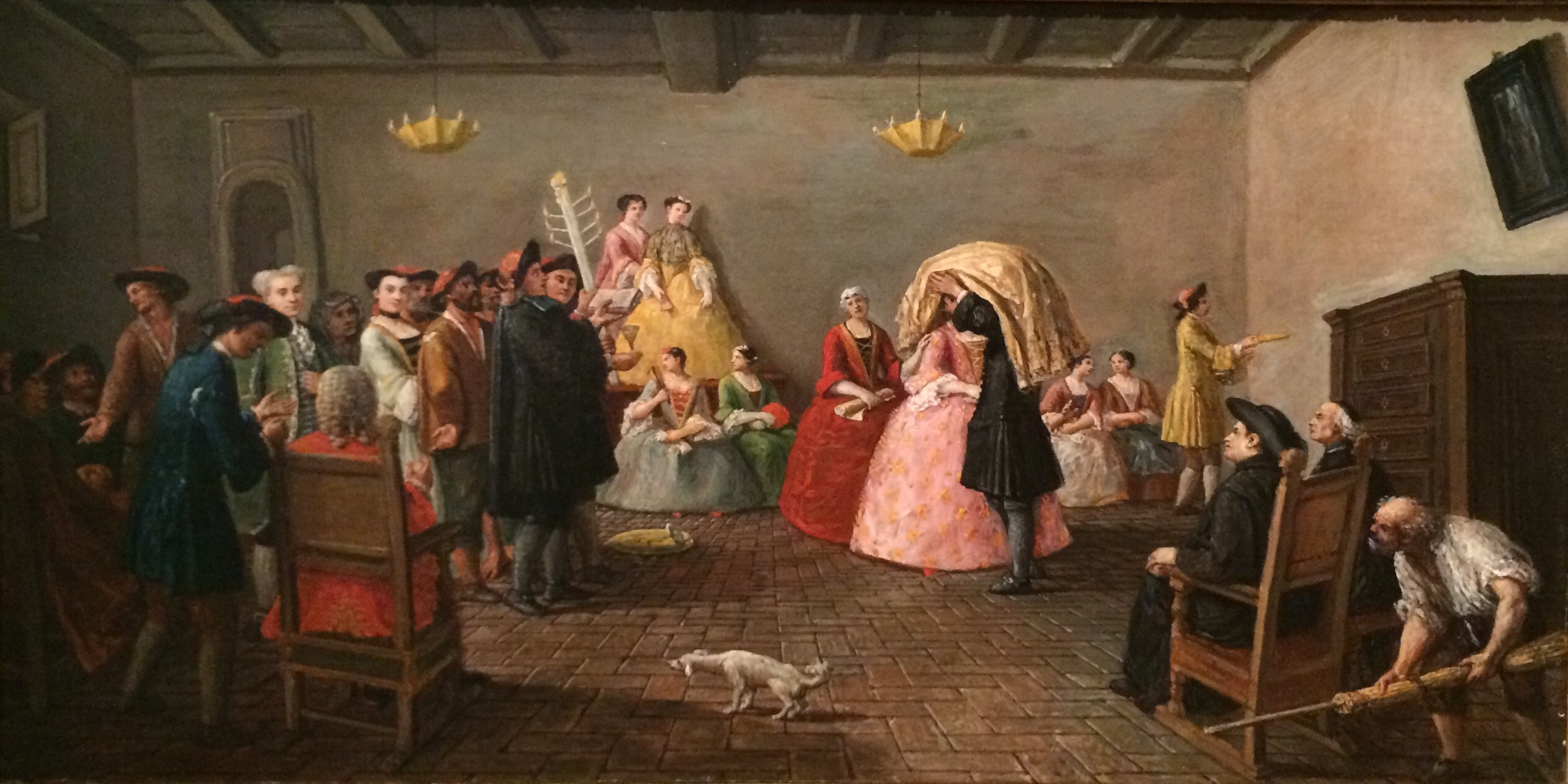
Jewish Wedding, Venice, 1780 Musée d'Art et d'Histoire du Judaïsme

Prior to the ceremony, Ashkenazi Jews have a custom for the groom to cover the face of the bride (usually with a veil), and a prayer is often said for her based on the words spoken to Rebecca in Genesis 24:60. The veiling ritual is known in Yiddish as badeken. Various reasons are given for the veil and the ceremony, a commonly accepted reason is that it reminds the Jewish people of how Jacob was tricked by Laban into marrying Leah before Rachel, as her face was covered by her veil (see Vayetze). Another reasoning is that Rebecca is said to have veiled herself when approached by Isaac, who would become her husband. Sephardi Jews do not perform this ceremony. Additionally, the veil emphasizes that the groom is not solely interested in the bride's external beauty, which fades with time; but rather in her inner beauty which she will never lose. If the couple has chosen to spend time apart leading up to the wedding day, this is the first time that they have seen each other since then.

== Unterfirers ==
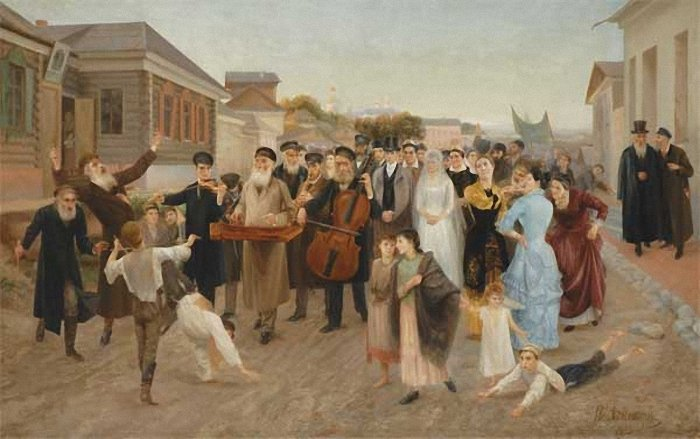
1893 painting of a Jewish marriage procession in a shtetl in Russia by Isaak Asknaziy

In many Orthodox Jewish communities, the bride is escorted to the chuppah by both mothers, and the groom is escorted by both fathers, known by Ashkenazi Jews as unterfirers (Yiddish: "Ones who lead under"). In another custom, bride and groom are each escorted by their respective parents. However, the escorts may be any happily married couple, if parents are unavailable or undesired for some reason. There is a custom in some Ashkenazi communities for the escorts to hold candles as they process to the chuppah.

== Circling ==
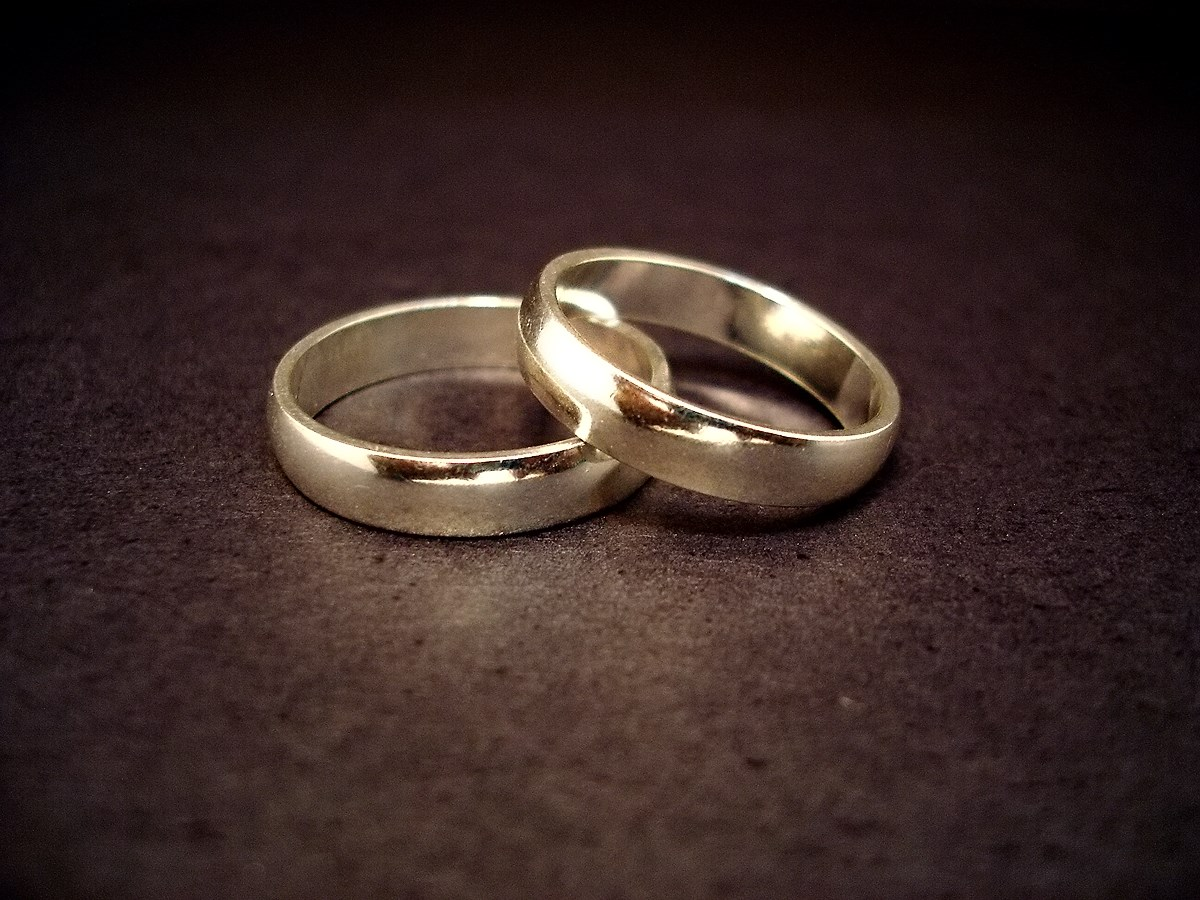
Plain gold wedding bands

In Ashkenazi tradition, the bride traditionally walks around the groom three or seven times when she arrives at the chuppah. This may derive from Jeremiah 31:22, "A woman shall surround a man". The three circuits may represent the three virtues of marriage: righteousness, justice and loving kindness (see Hosea 2:19). Seven circuits derives from the Biblical concept that seven denotes perfection or completeness. This has also been linked to when Joshua circled the walls of Jericho seven times and they were destroyed. Sephardic Jews do not perform this ceremony.

Increasingly, it is common in liberal or progressive Jewish communities (especially Reform, Reconstructionist, or Humanistic) to modify this custom for the sake of egalitarianism, or for a same-gender couple. One adaptation of this tradition is for the bride to circle the groom three times, then for the groom to circle his bride three times, and then for each to circle each other (as in a do-si-do). The symbolism of the circling has been reinterpreted to signify the centrality of one spouse to the other, or to represent the four imahot (matriarchs) and three avot (patriarchs).

== Presentation of the ring (Betrothal) ==
In traditional weddings, two blessings are recited before the betrothal; a blessing over wine, and the betrothal blessing, which is specified in the Talmud. The wine is then tasted by the couple.

Rings are not actually required; they are simply the most common way (since the Middle Ages) of fulfilling the bride price requirement. The bride price (or ring) must have a monetary value no less than a single prutah (the smallest denomination of currency used during the Talmudic era). The low value is to ensure that there are no financial barriers to access marriage.

According to Jewish law, the ring must be composed of solid metal (gold or silver are preferred; alloys are discouraged), with no jewel inlays or gem settings, so that it's easy to ascertain the ring's value. Others ascribe a more symbolic meaning, saying that the ring represents the ideal of purity and honesty in a relationship. However, it's quite common for Jewish couples (especially those who are not Orthodox) to use weddings rings with engraving, metallic embellishments, or to go a step further and use gemstone settings. Some Orthodox couples will use a simple gold or silver band during the ceremony to fulfill the halachic obligations, and after the wedding, the bride may wear a ring with any decoration she likes.

The groom gives the bride a ring, traditionally a plain wedding band, and recites the declaration: Behold, you are consecrated to me with this ring according to the law of Moses and Israel. The groom places the ring on the bride's right index finger. According to traditional Jewish law, two valid witnesses must see him place the ring.

During some egalitarian weddings, the bride will also present a ring to the groom, often with a quote from the Song of Songs: "Ani l'dodi, ve dodi li" (I am my beloved's and my beloved is mine), which may also be inscribed on the ring itself. This ring is sometimes presented outside the chuppah to avoid conflicts with Jewish law.

== Seven blessings ==
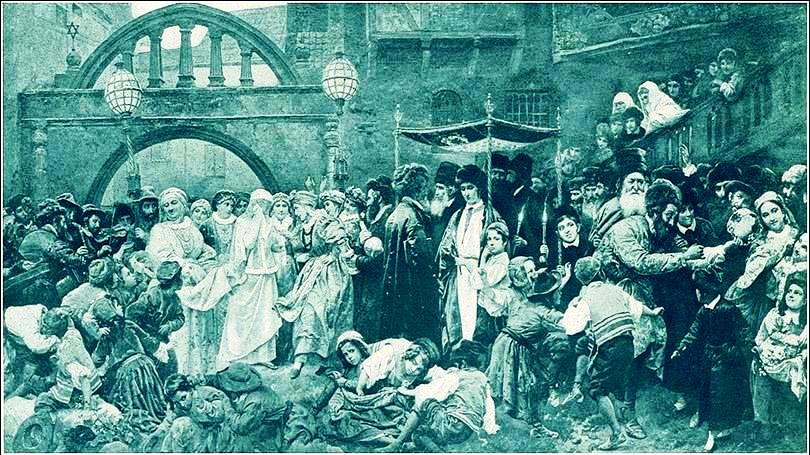
Traditional nissu'in in Eastern Europe during the 20th century

The wedding formally begins when The Sheva Brachot are read. The Sheva Brachot or seven blessings are recited by the hazzan or rabbi, or by select guests who are called up individually. Being called upon to recite one of the seven blessings is considered an honour. The groom is given the cup of wine to drink from after the seven blessings. The bride also drinks the wine. In some traditions, the cup will be held to the lips of the groom by his new father-in-law and to the lips of the bride by her new mother-in-law. Traditions vary as to whether additional songs are sung before the seven blessings.

== Breaking the glass ==
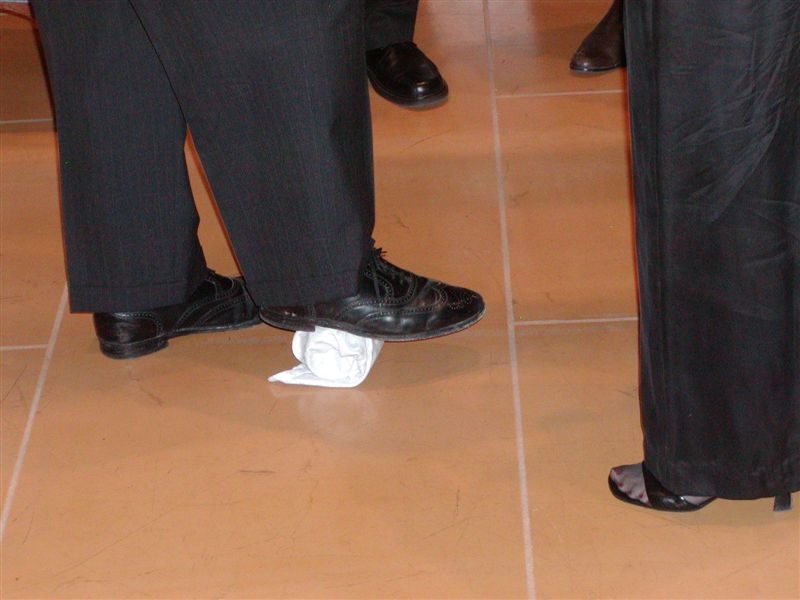
A groom breaking the glass

After the bride has been given the ring, or at the end of the ceremony (depending on local custom), the groom breaks a glass, crushing it with his right foot. There are different reasonings that exist for this custom. Some believe that breaking the glass is a way to temper the joyous occasion. The precise origin of this custom is unknown, although many reasons have been given. The sense that joy must always be tempered is based on two accounts in tractate Berakhot of the Babylonian Talmud of rabbis who, upon seeing that their son's wedding celebration was getting out of hand, broke a vessel – in the second case a glass – to calm things down. Tosafot and the Vilna Gaon were among the earliest to connect the Talmudic stories to the custom of breaking a glass at the wedding.

Despite the joy experienced at a wedding, Jews still mourn the destruction of the Temple in Jerusalem. Because of this, some recite verses 5 and 6 from Psalm 137 "If I forget thee / O Jerusalem..." at this point. Many other reasons have been given by traditional authorities.

Former Sephardic Chief Rabbi of Israel Ovadia Yosef strongly criticized the way this custom is sometimes carried out in Israel, arguing that "Many unknowledgeable people fill their mouths with laughter during the breaking of the glass, shouting 'mazel tov' and turning a beautiful custom meant to express our sorrow" over Jerusalem's destruction "into an opportunity for lightheadedness."

Reform Judaism has a new custom where brides and grooms break the wine glass together.

== Yichud ==
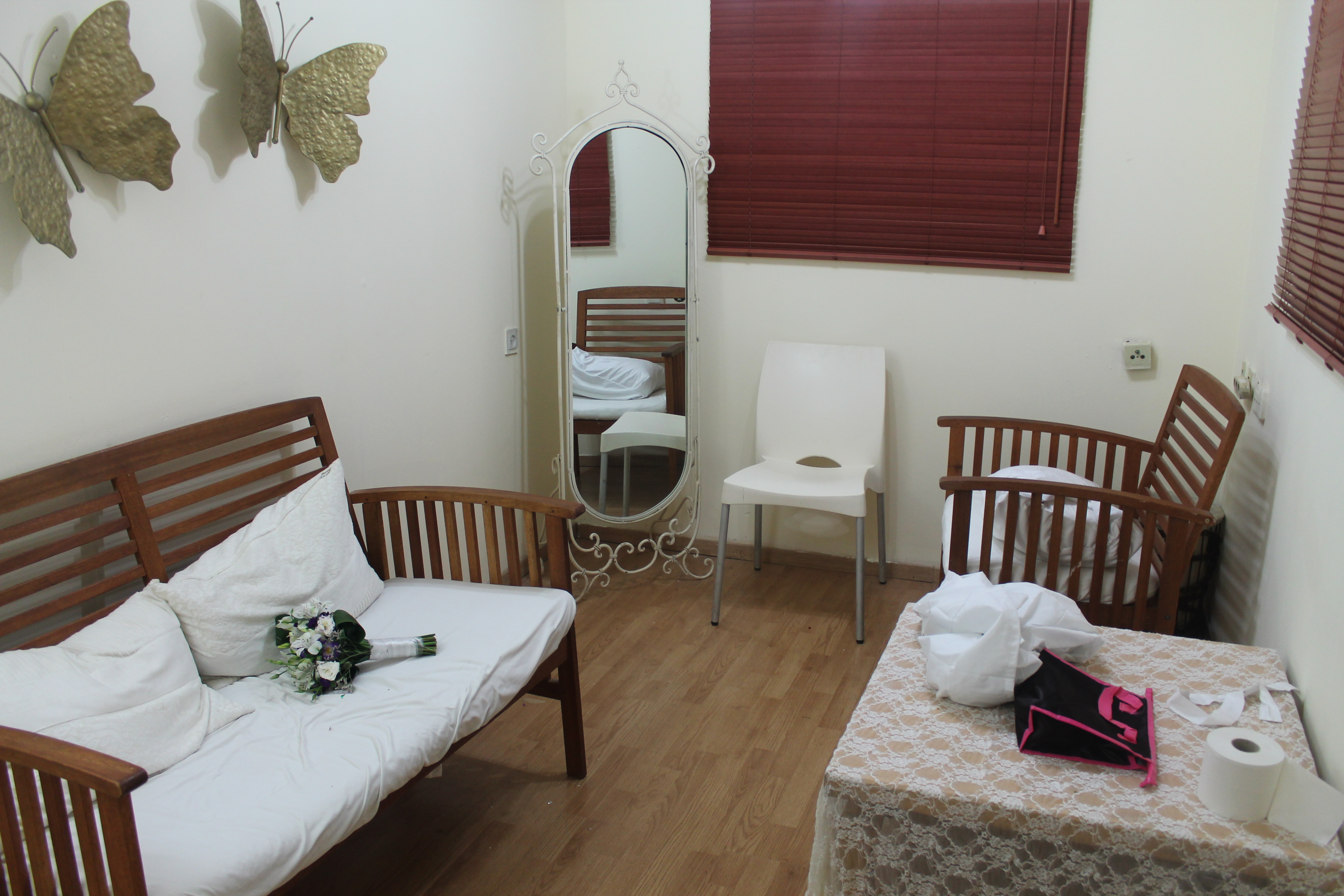
A typical Yichud room

Yichud (togetherness or seclusion) refers to the Ashkenazi practice of leaving the bride and groom alone for 8–20 minutes after the wedding ceremony, in which the couple retreat to a private room. Yichud can take place anywhere, from a rabbi's study to a synagogue classroom. The reason for yichud is that according to several authorities, standing under the canopy alone does not constitute chuppah, and seclusion is necessary to complete the wedding ceremony. However, Sephardic Jews do not have this custom, as they consider it a davar mechoar (repugnant thing), compromising the couple's modesty.

Today, the Yichud is not used to physically consummate the marriage. Instead, couples will often eat and relax together for this short period of time before the dancing and celebrations of nissuin begin. Since the wedding day is considered the bride and groom's personal Yom Kippur, they may choose to fast leading up to the wedding. The Yichud can be spent as a time for the couple to break their fast and have their first meal together. Even if they did not choose to fast, it is still a secluded opportunity for the couple to spend quality time with one another before continuing on with the busyness of their wedding day.

In Yemen, the Jewish practice was not for the groom and his bride to be secluded in a canopy (chuppah), as is widely practiced today in Jewish weddings, but rather in a bridal chamber that was, in effect, a highly decorated room in the house of the groom. This room was traditionally decorated with large hanging sheets of colored, patterned cloth, replete with wall cushions and short-length mattresses for reclining. Their marriage is consummated when they have been left together alone in this room. The chuppah is described the same way in Sefer HaIttur (12th century), and similarly in the Jerusalem Talmud.

== Wedding feast ==
After the wedding ceremony and the Yichud, the bride and groom will make a grand entrance into a room filled with friends and family to begin the celebrations. The wedding ceremony is considered a serious religious event, while the wedding feast is considered a fun, lively celebration for the couple. It is expected and required for the guests to bring joy and festivities to the couple on their wedding day.

At the wedding feast, there is dancing, singing, eating, and drinking. This is broken up into two celebrations. Towards the beginning of the wedding feast, there is dancing and celebrations, but men and women are separated. After a couple of hours, a more lively celebration begins. Typically, this occurs after the older guests leave, and there is a mixing of men and women (not at orthodox weddings), and a dance is usually involved.

== Special dances ==
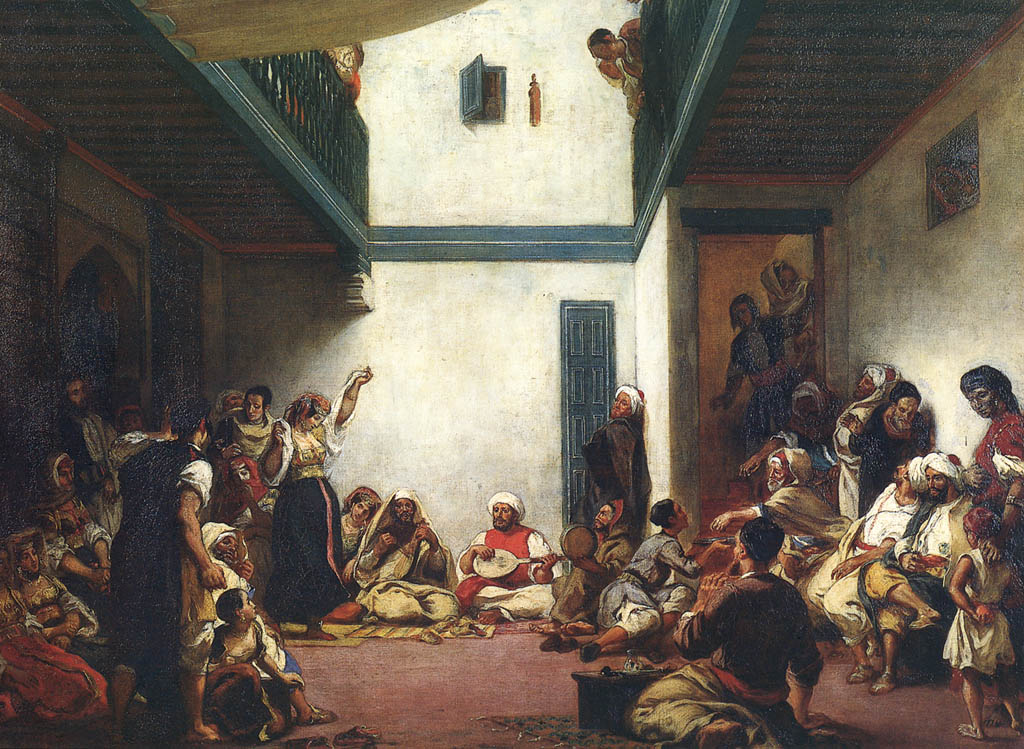
Jewish Wedding in Morocco by Eugène Delacroix, 1839

Dancing is a major feature of Jewish weddings. It is customary for the guests to dance in front of the seated couple and entertain them. Traditional Ashkenazi dances include:

- The Krenzl, in which the bride's mother is crowned with a wreath of flowers as her daughters dance around her (traditionally at the wedding of the mother's last unwed daughter).
- The Mizinke, a dance for the parents of the bride or groom when their last child is wed.
- The Horah, a circle dance. Dancers link arms or hold hands, and move with a grapevine step. In large groups, concentric circles may be formed.
- The gladdening of the bride, in which guests dance around the bride, and can include the use of shtick—silly items such as signs, banners, costumes, confetti, and jump ropes made of table napkins.
- The Mitzvah tantz, in which family members and honored rabbis are invited to dance in front of the bride (or sometimes with the bride in the case of a father or grandfather), often holding a gartel, and then dancing with the groom. At the end the bride and groom dance together themselves.

== Birkat hamazon and sheva brachot ==
After the meal, Birkat Hamazon (Grace after meals) is recited, followed by sheva brachot. At a wedding banquet, an enhanced version of the call to Birkat Hamazon is used, including (in Ashkenazic communities) the first stanza of Devai Haser. Prayer booklets called bentshers may be handed out to guests. After the prayers, the blessing over the wine is recited, with two glasses of wine poured together into a third, symbolising the creation of a new life together.

== Jewish prenuptial agreements ==
In present times, Jewish rabbinical bodies have developed Jewish prenuptial agreements designed to prevent the husband from withholding a get from his wife, should she want a divorce. Such documents have been developed and widely used in the United States, Israel, the United Kingdom and other places. However, this approach has not been universally accepted, particularly by the Orthodox.

Conservative Judaism developed the Lieberman clause in order to prevent husbands from refusing to give their wives a get. To do this, the ketubah has built in provisions; so, if predetermined circumstances occur, the divorce goes into effect immediately.

== Timing ==
Weddings should not be performed on Shabbat or on Jewish holidays, including Chol HaMoed. Weddings cannot be held on Shabbat because the purpose of a wedding is for the bride to acquire her groom, and vice versa. Shabbat regulations prohibit any transactions or acquisitions, so weddings are not allowed. Additionally, for guests to arrive at the wedding via transportation or for the wedding to be a success, there would have to be labor performed that day, which is not permitted. The period of the counting of the omer and the three weeks are also prohibited, although customs vary regarding part of these periods. Some months and days are considered more or less auspicious.

== See also ==
- Jewish views on marriage
- Chuppah
- Seudat nissuin
- Jewish divorce
- Marriage in Israel
