= Disciple (Christianity) =

Dedicated follower of Jesus

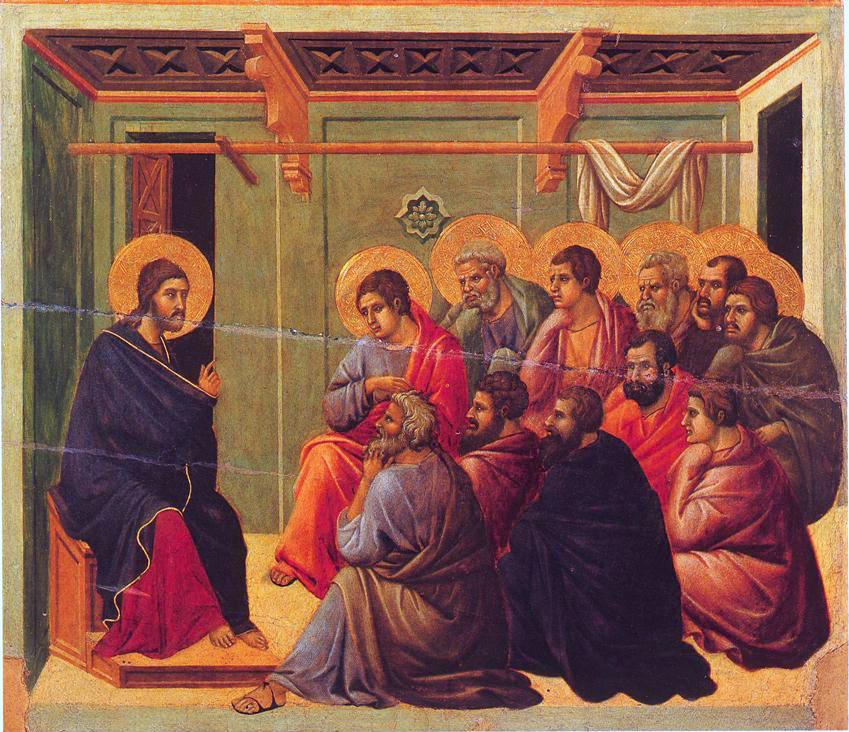
Jesus giving the Farewell Discourse (John 14–17) to his disciples, after the Last Supper, from the Maestà by Duccio, 1308–1311

In Christianity, a disciple is a dedicated follower of Jesus. This term is found in the New Testament only in the Gospels and Acts. Originating in the ancient Near East, the concept of a disciple is an adherent of a teacher. Discipleship is not the same as being a student in the modern sense; a disciple in the ancient biblical world actively imitated both the life and teaching of the master. It was a deliberate apprenticeship which made the fully formed disciple a living copy of the master.

The New Testament records many followers of Jesus during his ministry. Some disciples were given a mission, such as the Little Commission, the commission of the seventy in Luke's Gospel, the Great Commission after the resurrection of Jesus, or the conversion of Paul, making them apostles, charged with proclaiming the gospel (the Good News) to the world. Jesus emphasised that being his disciples would be costly.

== Background of the term ==
The term "disciple" represents the Koine Greek word mathētḗs (μαθητής), which generally means "one who engages in learning through instruction from another, pupil, apprentice" or in religious contexts such as the Bible, "one who is rather constantly associated with someone who has a pedagogical reputation or a particular set of views, disciple, adherent." The word "disciple" comes into English usage by way of the Latin discipulus meaning a learner, but given its biblical background, should not be confused with the more common English word "student."

A disciple is different from an apostle, which instead means a messenger, more specifically "messengers with extraordinary status, especially of God's messenger, envoy." But predominately in the New Testament it is used of "a group of highly honored believers with a special function as God's envoys." While a disciple is one who learns and apprentices under a teacher or rabbi, an apostle is one sent as a missionary to proclaim the good news and to establish new communities of believers.

The meaning of the word "disciple" is not derived primarily from its root meaning or etymology but from its widespread usage in the ancient world. Disciples are found in the world outside of the Bible. For example among the ancient Greek philosophers, disciples learned by imitating the teacher's entire way of life and not just by remembering the spoken words of the teacher.

The first-century philosopher Seneca appeals to the "living voice and intimacy of common life" of the disciple–teacher relationship of many different philosophers:

Cleanthes could not have been the express image of Zeno, if he had merely heard his lectures; he also shared in his life, saw into his hidden purposes, and watched him to see whether he lived according to his own rules. Plato, Aristotle, and the whole throng of sages who were destined to go each his different way, derived more benefit from the character than from the words of Socrates.

In the world of the Bible, a disciple was a person who followed a teacher, or rabbi, or master, or philosopher. The disciple desired to learn not only the teaching of the rabbi, but to imitate the practical details of their life. A disciple did not merely attend lectures or read books, they were required to interact with and imitate a real living person. A disciple would literally follow someone in hopes of eventually becoming what they are.

A Christian disciple is a believer who follows Christ and then offers his own imitation of Christ as model for others to follow (1 Corinthians 11:1). A disciple is first a believer who has exercised faith (Acts 2:38; see also Born again (Catholicism)) This means they have experienced conversion and put Jesus at the center of their life and participated in rites of Christian imitation. A fully developed disciple is also a leader of others who attempts to pass on this faith to his followers, with the goal of repeating this process.(1 Corinthians 4:16–17; 2 Timothy 2:2).

== Great crowd and the seventy ==
In addition to the Twelve Apostles there is a much larger group of people identified as disciples in the opening of the passage of the Sermon on the Plain. In addition, seventy (or seventy-two, depending on the source used) people are sent out in pairs to prepare the way for Jesus (Luke 10). They are sometimes referred to as the "Seventy" or the "Seventy Disciples". They are to eat any food offered, heal the sick and spread the word that the Kingdom of God is coming.

== Outcasts ==
Jesus practiced open table fellowship, scandalizing his critics by dining with sinners, tax collectors, Samaritans, and women.

=== Sinners and tax collectors ===
The gospels use the term "sinners and tax collectors" to depict those he fraternized with. Sinners were Jews who violated purity rules, or generally any of the 613 mitzvot, or possibly Gentiles who violated Noahide Law, though halacha was still in dispute in the 1st century, see also Hillel and Shammai and Circumcision controversy in early Christianity. Tax collectors profited from the Roman economic system that the Romans imposed in Iudaea province, which was displacing Galileans in their own homeland, foreclosing on family land and selling it to absentee landlords. In the honor-based culture of the time, such behavior went against the social grain.

=== Samaritans ===
Samaritans, positioned between Jesus' Galilee and Jerusalem's Judea, were mutually hostile with Jews. In Luke and John, Jesus extends his ministry to Samaritans.

=== Women who followed Jesus ===
In Luke (10:38–42), Mary, sister of Lazarus, is contrasted with her sister Martha, who was "cumbered about many things" while Jesus was their guest, while Mary had chosen "the better part," that of listening to the master's discourse. John names her as the "one who had anointed the Lord with perfumed oil and dried his feet with her hair" (11:2). In Luke, an unidentified "sinner" in the house of a Pharisee anoints Jesus' feet. Luke refers to a number of people accompanying Jesus and the twelve. From among them he names three women: "Mary, called Magdalene, ... and Joanna the wife of Herod's steward Chuza, and Susanna, and many others, who provided for them out of their resources" (Luke 8:2–3). Mary Magdalene and Joanna are among the women who went to prepare Jesus's body in Luke's account of the resurrection, and who later told the apostles and other disciples about the empty tomb and words of the "two men in dazzling clothes". Mary Magdalene is the most well-known of the disciples outside of the Twelve. More is written in the gospels about her than the other female followers. There is also a large body of lore and literature covering her.

Other gospel writers differ as to which women witness the crucifixion and witness to the resurrection. Mark includes Mary, the mother of James and Salome (not to be confused with Salomé the daughter of Herodias) at the crucifixion and Salome at the tomb. John includes Mary the wife of Clopas at the crucifixion.

Tabitha (Dorcas) is the only female follower of Jesus named in the New Testament and explicitly called a disciple.

=== Cleopas and companion on the road to Emmaus ===
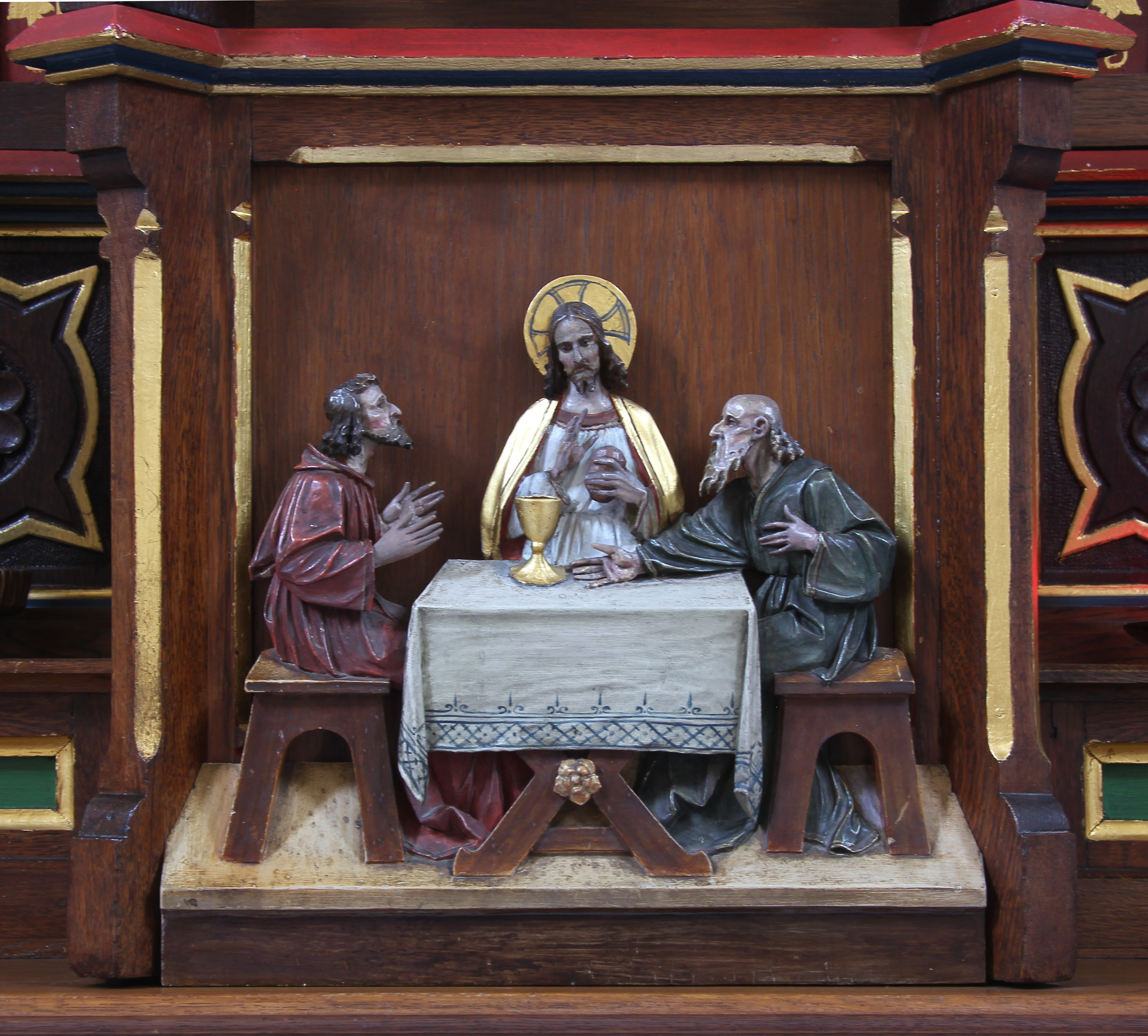
Jesus with two disciples in Emmaus

In Luke, Cleopas is one of the two disciples to whom the risen Lord appears at Emmaus (Luke 24:18). Cleopas and an unnamed disciple of Jesus are walking from Jerusalem to Emmaus on the day of Jesus's resurrection. Cleopas and his friend are discussing the events of the past few days when a stranger asks them what they spoke of. The stranger is asked to join Cleopas and his friend for the evening meal, where the stranger is revealed, in blessing and breaking the bread, as the risen Jesus. He then disappears. Cleopas and his friend hasten to Jerusalem to carry the news to the other disciples, to discover that Jesus has appeared there also and will do so again. The incident has no parallel passage in Matthew, Mark, or John.

== Discipleship ==
=== "Love one another" ===
A definition of disciple is suggested by Jesus's self-referential example from the Gospel of John 13:34–35: "I give you a new commandment, that you love one another. Just as I have loved you, you also should love one another. By this everyone will know that you are my disciples, if you have love for one another." (NRSV) Further definition by Jesus can be found in the Gospel of Luke, Chapter 14. Beginning with a testing trap laid out by his adversaries regarding observance of the Jewish Sabbath, Jesus uses the opportunity to lay out the problems with the religiosity of his adversaries against his own teaching by giving a litany of shocking comparisons between various, apparent socio-political and socio-economic realities versus the meaning of being his disciple.

=== "Be transformed" ===
The canonical gospels, Acts, and the Pauline epistles urge disciples to be imitators of Jesus Christ or of God himself. Being imitators requires obedience exemplified by moral behavior. With this biblical basis, Christian theology teaches that discipleship entails transformation from some other worldview and practice of life into that of Jesus Christ, and so, by way of Trinitarian theology, of God himself.

Paul the Apostle stressed transformation as a prerequisite for discipleship when he wrote that disciples must "not be conformed to this world" but must "be transformed by the renewing of [their] minds" so that they "may discern what is the will of God—what is good and acceptable and perfect." Therefore, a disciple is not simply an accumulator of information or one who merely changes moral behavior in conformity with the teachings of Jesus Christ, but seeks a fundamental shift toward the ethics of Jesus Christ in every way, including complete devotion to God.

In several Christian traditions, the process of becoming a disciple is called the Imitation of Christ. This concept goes back to the Pauline epistles: "be imitators of God" (Ephesians 5:1) and "be imitators of me, as I am of Christ" (1 Corinthians 11:1). The Imitation of Christ by Thomas à Kempis promoted this concept in the 14th century.

=== The Great Commission ===
Ubiquitous throughout Christianity is the practice of proselytism, making new disciples. In Matthew, at the beginning of Jesus' ministry, when calling his earliest disciples—Simon Peter and Andrew—he says to them: "Follow me and I will make you fishers of men" (Matthew 4:19). Then, at the very end of his ministry Jesus institutes the Great Commission, commanding all present to "go therefore and make disciples of all nations, baptizing them in the name of the Father and of the Son and of the Holy Spirit, and teaching them to obey everything that I have commanded you" (Matthew 28:19-20a).

=== Family and wealth ===
Jesus called on disciples to give up their wealth and their familial ties. In his society, family was the individual's source of identity, so renouncing it would mean becoming virtually nobody. In Luke 9:58–62, Jesus used a hyperbolic metaphor to stress the importance of this, and another in Luke 14:26: "If anyone comes to me and does not hate father and mother, wife and children, brothers and sisters—yes, even their own life—such a person cannot be my disciple." There are different interpretations of this text on counting the cost of discipleship.

=== Discipleship Movement ===
The "Discipleship Movement" (also known as the "Shepherding Movement") was an influential and controversial movement within some British and American churches, emerging in the 1970s and early 1980s. The doctrine of the movement emphasized the "one another" passages of the New Testament, and the mentoring relationship prescribed by the Apostle Paul in 2 Timothy 2:2 of the Holy Bible. It was controversial in that it gained a reputation for controlling and abusive behavior, with a great deal of emphasis placed upon the importance of obedience to one's own shepherd. The movement was later denounced by several of its founders, although some form of the movement continues today.

=== Radical discipleship ===
Radical discipleship is a movement in practical theology that has emerged from a yearning to follow the true message of Jesus and a discontentment with mainstream Christianity. Radical Christians, such as Ched Myers and Lee Camp, believe mainstream Christianity has moved away from its origins, namely the core teachings and practices of Jesus such as turning the other cheek and rejecting materialism. Radical is derived from the Latin word radix meaning "root", referring to the need for perpetual re-orientation towards the root truths of Christian discipleship.

Radical discipleship also refers to the Anabaptist Reformation movement beginning in Zurich, Switzerland in 1527. This movement grew in part out of the belief that the Protestant Reformers such Martin Luther, John Calvin and Ulrich Zwingli were not going far enough in their respective reforms.

== See also ==
- Athol Gill
- Catechesis
- First disciples of Jesus
- Formation in the Catholic Church
- John Hirt
- Jesuism
