= Parables of Jesus =

Parables taught by Jesus of Nazareth according to Christian gospels

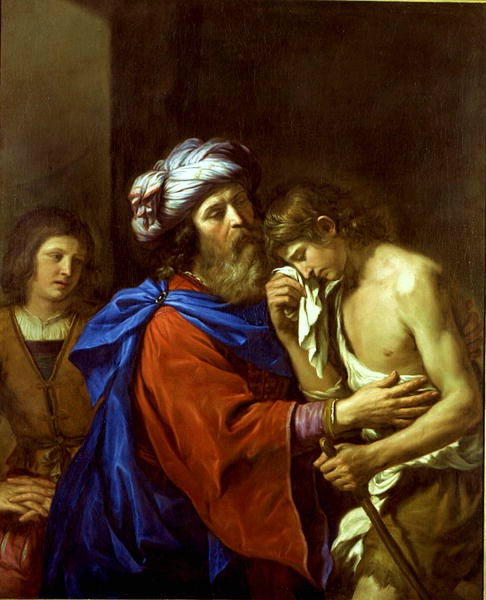
The Parable of the Prodigal Son by Guercino, 1651

The parables of Jesus are found in the Synoptic Gospels and some of the non-canonical gospels. They form approximately one third of his recorded teachings. Christians place great emphasis on these parables, which are traditionally regarded as the words of Jesus.

Jesus's parables are seemingly simple and memorable stories, often with imagery, and all teach a lesson in daily life. Scholars have commented that although these parables seem simple, the messages they convey are deep, and central to the teachings of Jesus. Christian authors view them not as mere similitudes that serve the purpose of illustration, but as internal analogies in which nature becomes a witness for the spiritual world.

Many of Jesus's parables refer to simple everyday things, such as a woman baking bread (the parable of the Leaven), a man knocking on his neighbor's door at night (the parable of the Friend at Night), or the aftermath of a roadside mugging (the parable of the Good Samaritan); yet they deal with major religious themes, such as the growth of the Kingdom of God, the importance of prayer, and the meaning of love.

In Western civilization, these parables formed the prototype for the term parable and in the modern age, even among those who know little of the Bible, the parables of Jesus remain some of the best-known stories in the world.

== Roots and sources ==
As a translation of the Hebrew word מָשָׁל, mashal, the word parable can also refer to a riddle. At all times in their history the Jews were familiar with teaching by means of parables and a number of parables also exist in the Old Testament. The use of parables by Jesus was hence a natural teaching method that fit into the tradition of his time. Tom Wright observes that his parables are similar to the dreams recounted in the Old Testament, which are presented "in search of meanings". The parables of Jesus have been quoted, taught, and discussed since the very beginnings of Christianity.

== Nature of the parables ==
Parables are one of the many literary forms in the Bible, but are especially seen in the gospels of the New Testament. Parables are generally considered to be short stories such as the Good Samaritan, and are differentiated from metaphorical statements such as, "You are the salt of the earth." A true parable may be regarded as an extended simile. Adolf Jülicher viewed parables as extended metaphors with a picture part (Bildhälfte), a reality part (Sachhälfte), and a point of comparison (tertium comparationis) between the picture part and the reality part. For example, the following parable in Luke 7:31–32 illustrates Jülicher's approach to parables:

To what then will I compare the people of this generation, and what are they like? They are like children sitting in the marketplace and calling to one another: "We played the flute for you, and you did not dance; we wailed, and you did not weep."

Although some suggest parables are essentially extended allegories, others emphatically argue the opposite. Dr. Kenneth Boa states that "Parables are extended figures of comparison that often use short stories to teach a truth or answer a question. While the story in a parable is not historical, it is true to life, not a fairy tale. As a form of oral literature, the parable exploits realistic situations but makes effective use of the imagination... Some of the parables [of Christ] were designed to reveal mysteries to those on the inside and to conceal the truth to those on the outside who would not hear."

=== Canonical gospels ===
The three synoptic gospels contain the parables of Jesus. Most scholars have accepted the parables of Jesus in the gospels as authentic. There are a growing number of scholars who also find parables in the Gospel of John, such as the little stories of the Good Shepherd (John 10:1–5) or the childbearing woman (John 16:21). (Note: See, for instance, Zimmermann 2015, pp. 333–360; see the German-For-Neutestamentler-BLOG The Vine and the Branches by David Tryon, as others have throughout history including Calvin 1847, p. 106) Otherwise, John includes allegories but no parables. Several authors such as Barbara Reid, Arland Hultgren or Donald Griggs comment that "parables are noticeably absent from the Gospel of John". (Note: Barry 1911 states "There are no parables in St. John's Gospel", and von Hügel 1911 states "Here Jesus' teaching contains no parables and but three allegories, the Synoptists present it as parabolic through and through".)

William Barry states in the Catholic Encyclopedia (1913) "There are no parables in St. John's Gospel. In the Synoptics [...] we reckon thirty-three in all; but some have raised the number even to sixty, by including proverbial expressions". The Gospel of Luke contains both the largest total number of parables (24) and eighteen unique parables; the Gospel of Matthew contains 23 parables of which eleven are unique; and the Gospel of Mark contains eight parables of which two are unique.

In Harmony of the Gospels, Cox and Easley provide a Gospel harmony for the parables based on the following counts: only in Matthew: 11; only in Mark: 2; only in Luke: 18; Matthew and Luke: 4; Matthew, Mark and Luke: 6. They list no parables for the Gospel of John.

=== Other documents ===
Parables attributed to Jesus are also found in other documents apart from the Bible. Some of these overlap those in the canonical gospels and some are not part of the Bible. The non-canonical Gospel of Thomas contains up to fifteen parables, eleven of which have parallels in the four canonical Gospels. The unknown author of the Gospel of Thomas did not have a special word for 'parable', making it difficult to know what they considered a parable. (Note: The actual number of parables in Thomas is fluid. John Dominic Crossan counts 15, Ron Cameron 14, and Bernard Brandon Scott 13. See also Crossan 1992 and Cameron 1986) Those unique to Thomas include the Parable of the Assassin and the Parable of the Empty Jar.

The noncanonical Apocryphon of James also contains three unique parables attributed to Jesus. They are known as "The Parable of the Ear of Grain", "The Parable of the Grain of Wheat", and "The Parable of the Date-Palm Shoot".

Most Lukan parables are unique found in the gospel rather than shared. John P. Meier argues that most parables are marked by the theology of Matthew and Luke and that few of the parables can be attributed with confidence to the historical Jesus, although other scholars disagree.

== Purpose and motive ==
In the Gospel of Matthew (13:10–17) Jesus provides an answer when asked about his use of parables:

Then his disciples asked him what this parable meant. He said, "To you it has been given to know the secrets of the kingdom of God; but to others I speak in parables, so that 'looking they may not perceive, and listening they may not understand.'"

— Luke 8:9–10, New Revised Standard Version

While Mark 4:33–34 and Matthew 13:34–35 may suggest that Jesus would only speak to the "crowds" in parables, while in private explaining everything to his disciples, some modern scholars do not support the private explanations argument and surmise that Jesus used parables as a teaching method. Dwight Pentecost suggests that given that Jesus often preached to a mixed audience of believers and non-believers, he used parables to reveal the truth to some, but hide it from others.

The Anglican bishop of Montreal, Ashton Oxenden, suggests that Jesus constructed his parables based on his divine knowledge of how man can be taught:

This was a mode of teaching, which our blessed Lord seemed to take special delight in employing. And we may be quite sure, that as "He knew what was in man" better than we know, He would not have taught by Parables, if He had not felt that this was the kind of teaching best suited to our wants.

— Oxenden 1864, p. 1

In the 19th century, Lisco and Fairbairn stated that in the parables of Jesus, "the image borrowed from the visible world is accompanied by a truth from the invisible (spiritual) world" and that the parables of Jesus are not "mere similitudes which serve the purpose of illustration, but are internal analogies where nature becomes a witness for the spiritual world".

Similarly, in the 20th century, calling a parable "an earthly story with a heavenly meaning", William Barclay states that the parables of Jesus use familiar examples to lead men's minds towards heavenly concepts. He suggests that Jesus did not form his parables merely as analogies but based on an "inward affinity between the natural and the spiritual order."

== Themes ==
A number of parables that are adjacent in one or more gospels have similar themes. The parable of the Leaven follows the parable of the Mustard Seed in Matthew and Luke, and shares the theme of the Kingdom of Heaven growing from small beginnings. The parable of the Hidden Treasure and parable of the Pearl form a pair illustrating the great value of the Kingdom of Heaven, and the need for action in attaining it.

The parables of the Lost Sheep, Lost Coin, and Lost (Prodigal) Son form a trio in Luke dealing with loss and redemption.

The parable of the Faithful Servant and parable of the Ten Virgins, adjacent in Matthew, involve waiting for a bridegroom, and have an eschatological theme of being prepared for the day of reckoning. The parable of the Tares the parable of the Rich Fool, the parable of the budding fig tree, and the parable of the barren fig tree also have eschatological themes.

Other parables stand alone, such as the parable of the unforgiving servant, dealing with forgiveness; the parable of the Good Samaritan, dealing with practical love; and the parable of the Friend at Night, dealing with persistence in prayer.

=== Kingdom of Heaven: hearing, seeking, and growing ===
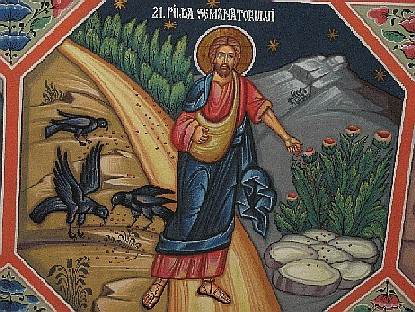
Sower

Sower

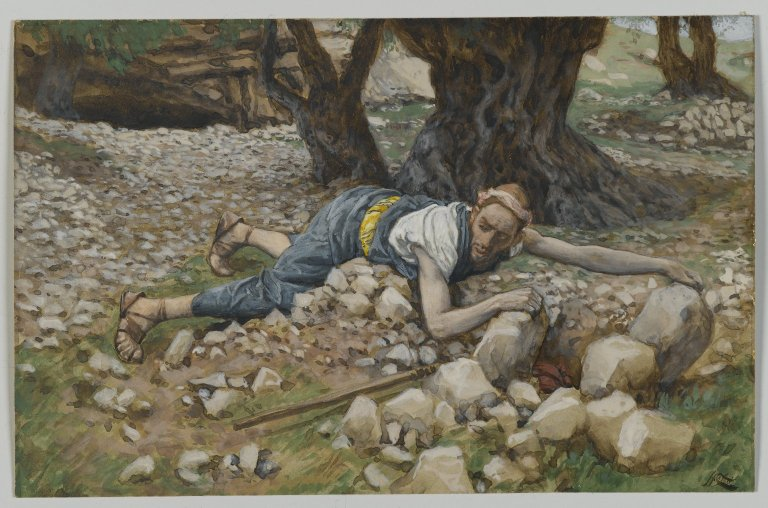
Hidden Treasure

Hidden Treasure

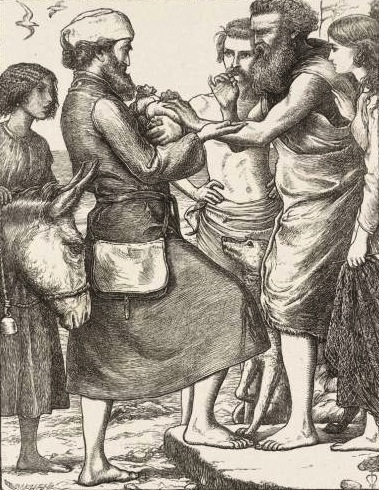
Pearl (of Great Price)

Pearl

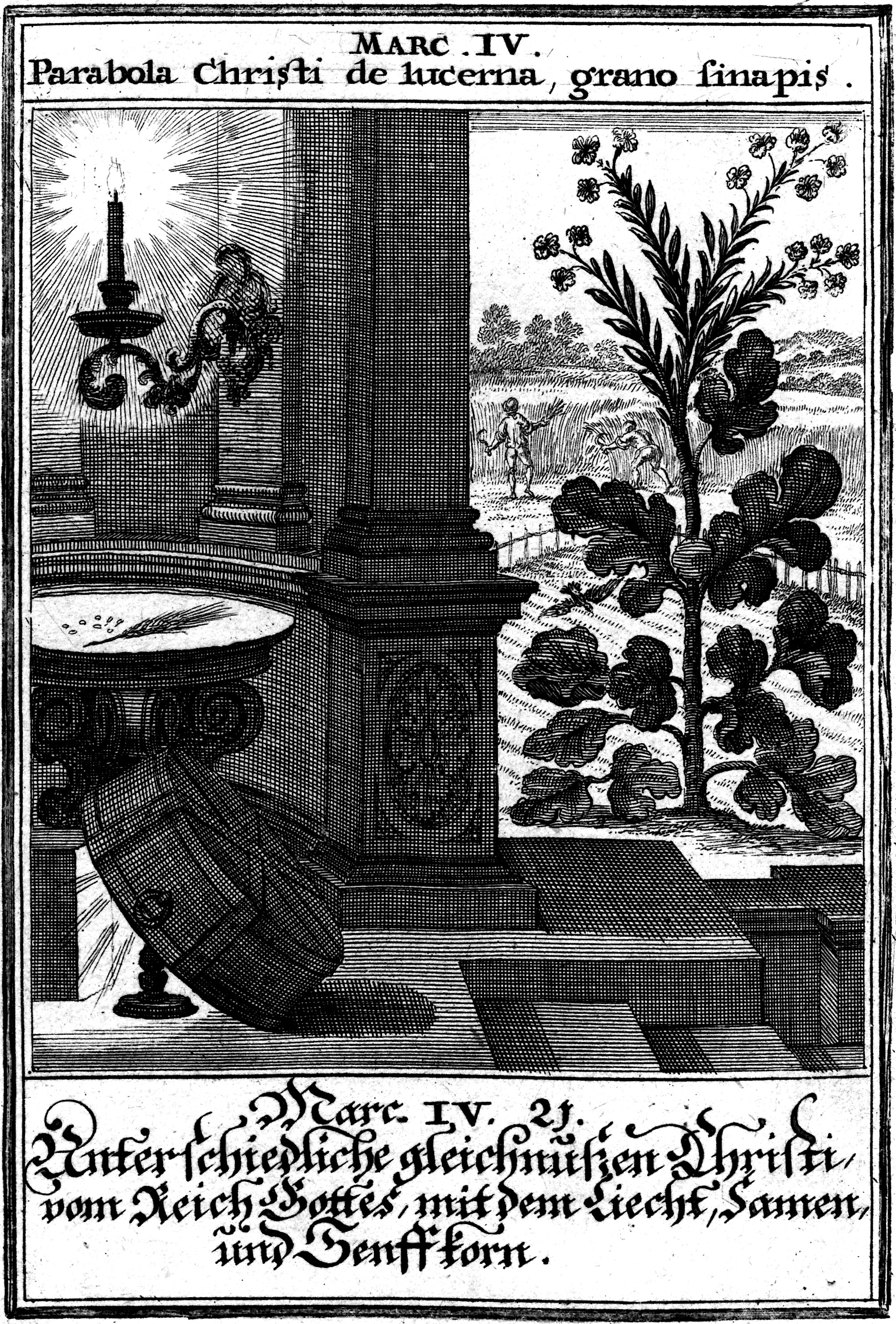
Growing Seed

Growing Seed

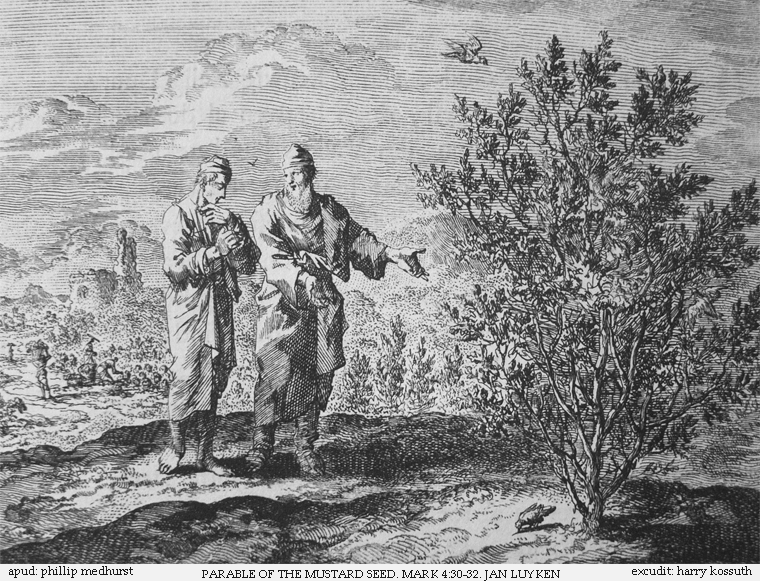
Mustard Seed

Mustard Seed

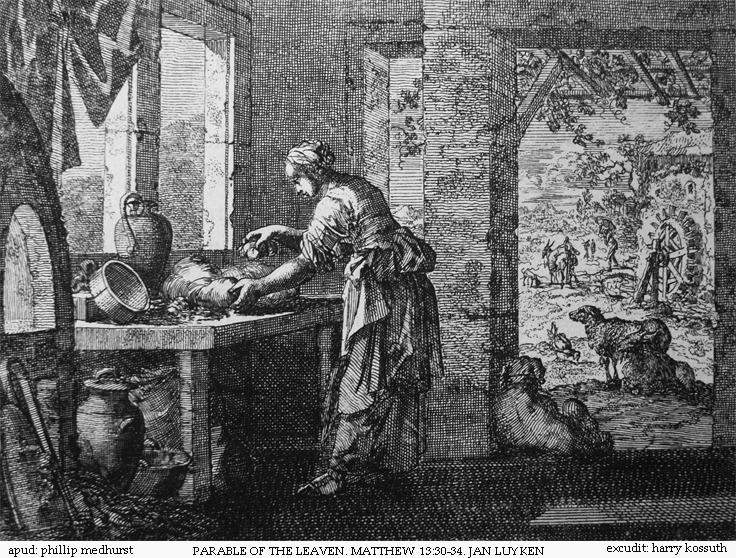
Leaven

Leaven

=== Loss and redemption ===
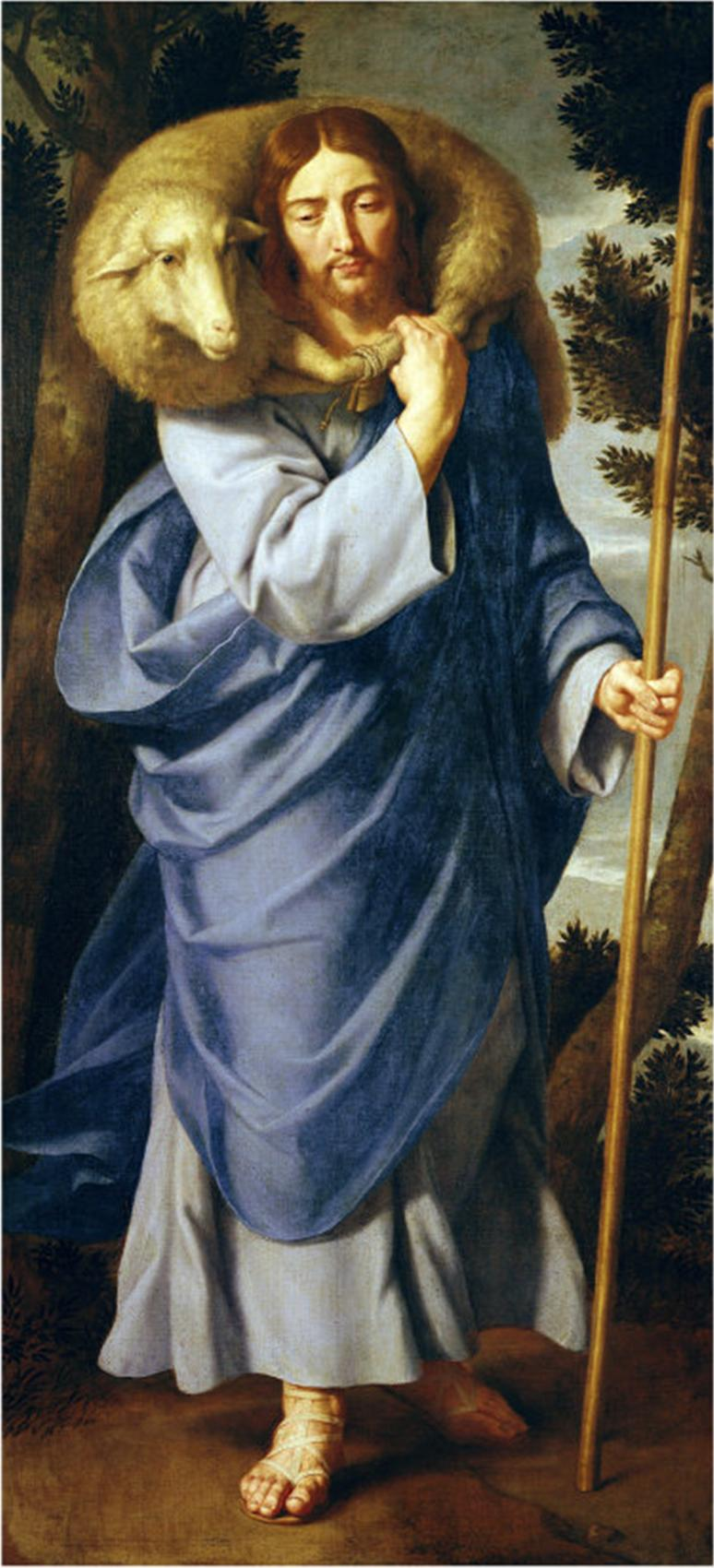
Lost Sheep

Lost Sheep

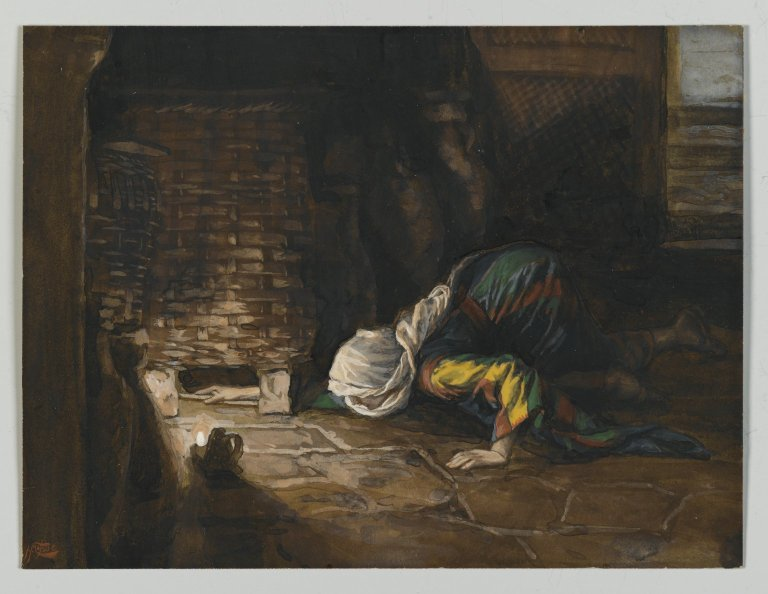
Lost Coin

Lost Coin

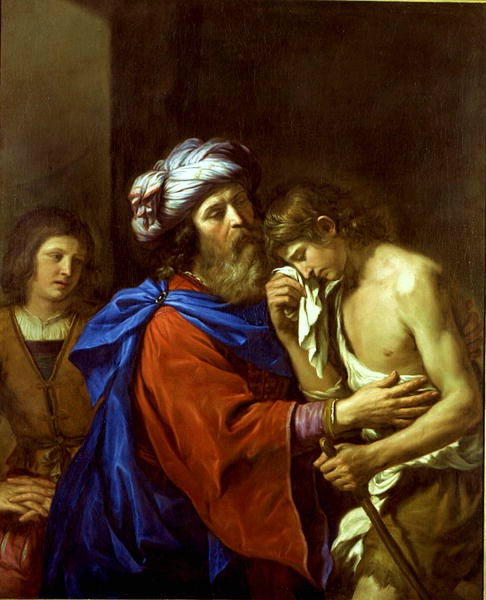
Prodigal (Lost) Son

Prodigal (Lost) Son

=== Love and forgiveness ===
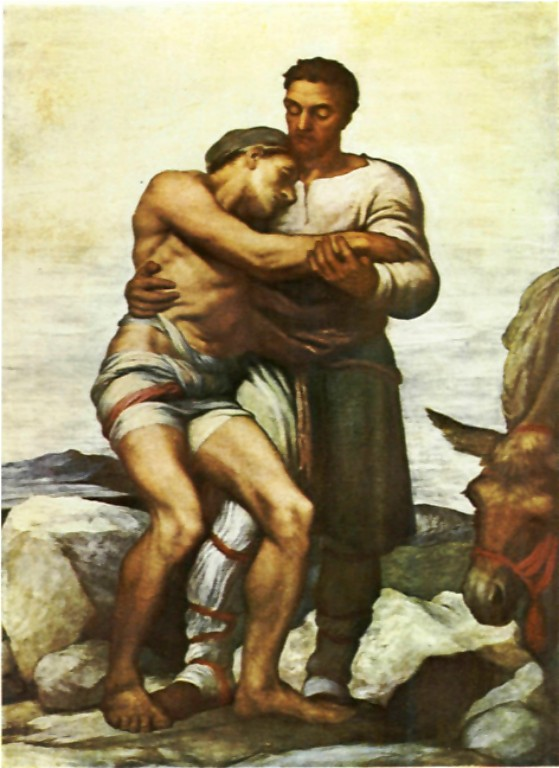
Good Samaritan

Good Samaritan

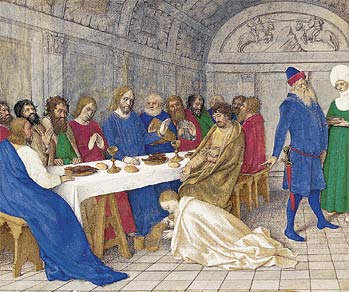
Two Debtors

Two Debtors

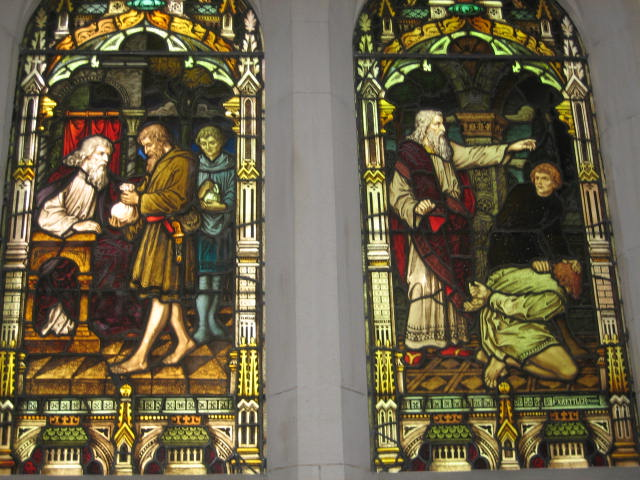
Unforgiving (Unmerciful) Servant

Unforgiving Servant

=== Prayer ===
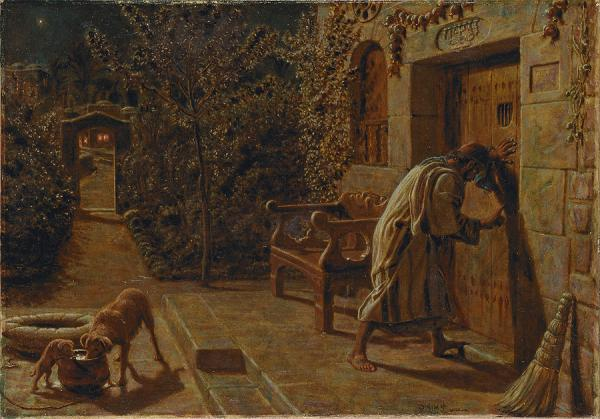
Friend at Night (Importunate Neighbour)

Friend at Night

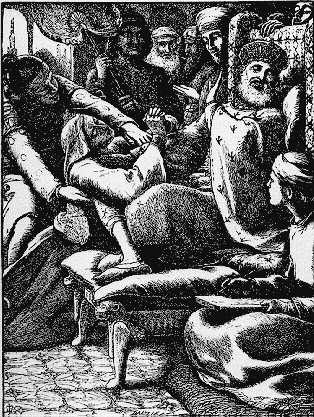
Unjust Judge (Importunate Widow)

Unjust Judge

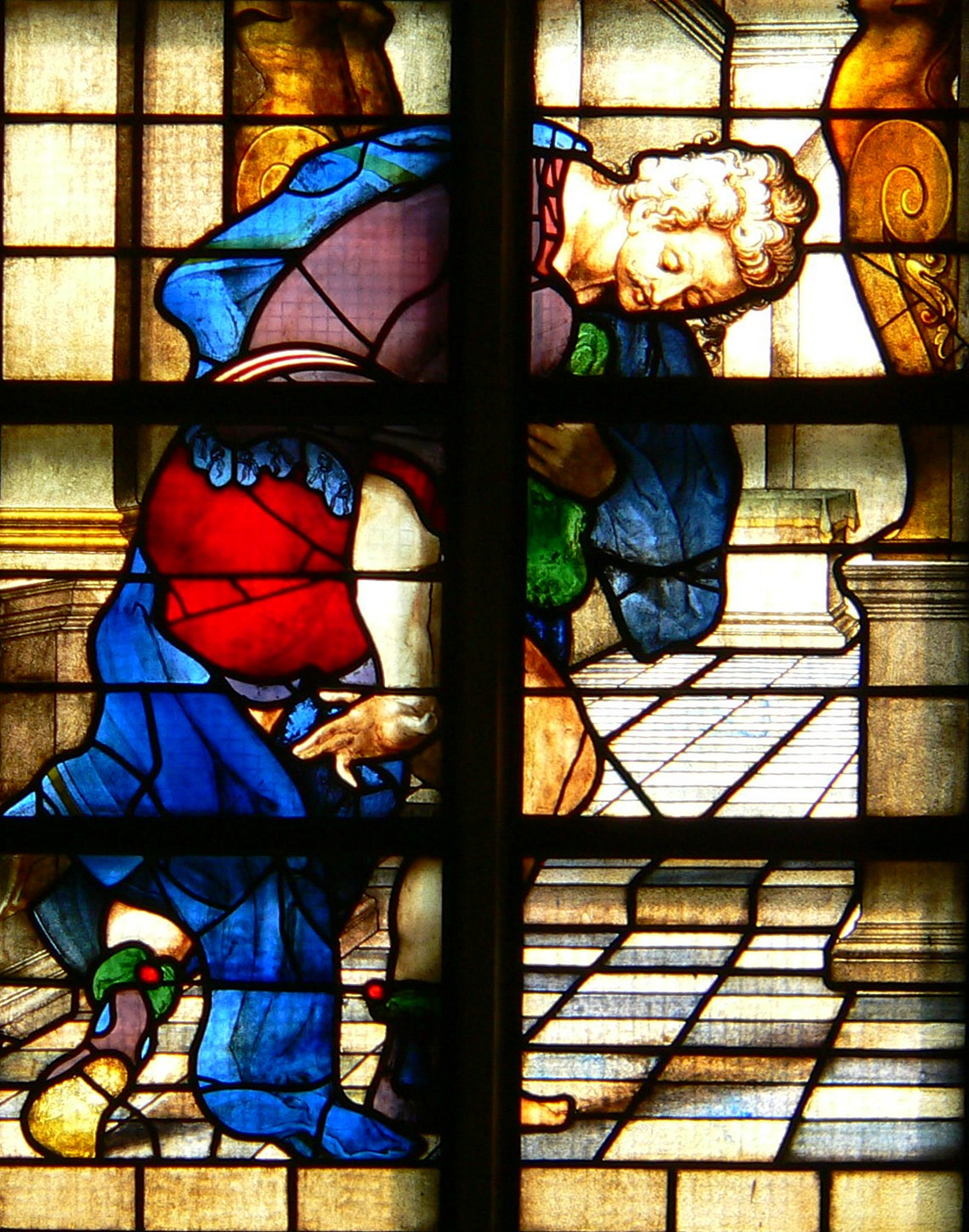
Pharisee and Publican (Tax Collector)

Pharisee & Publican

=== Eschatology ===
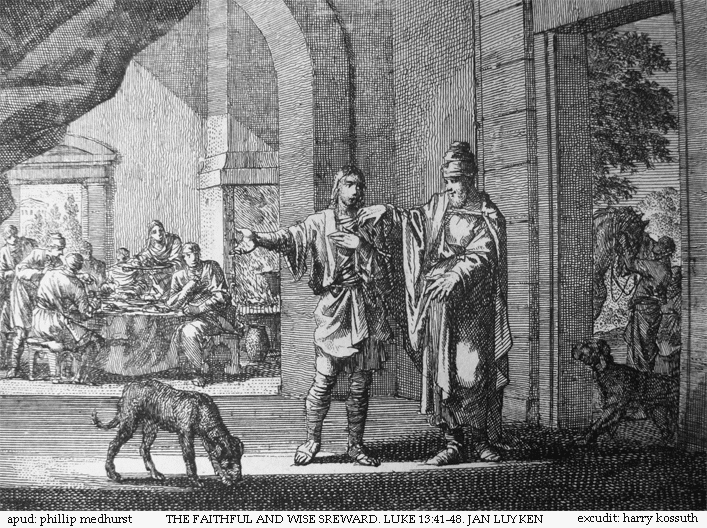
Faithful Servant (Door Keeper)

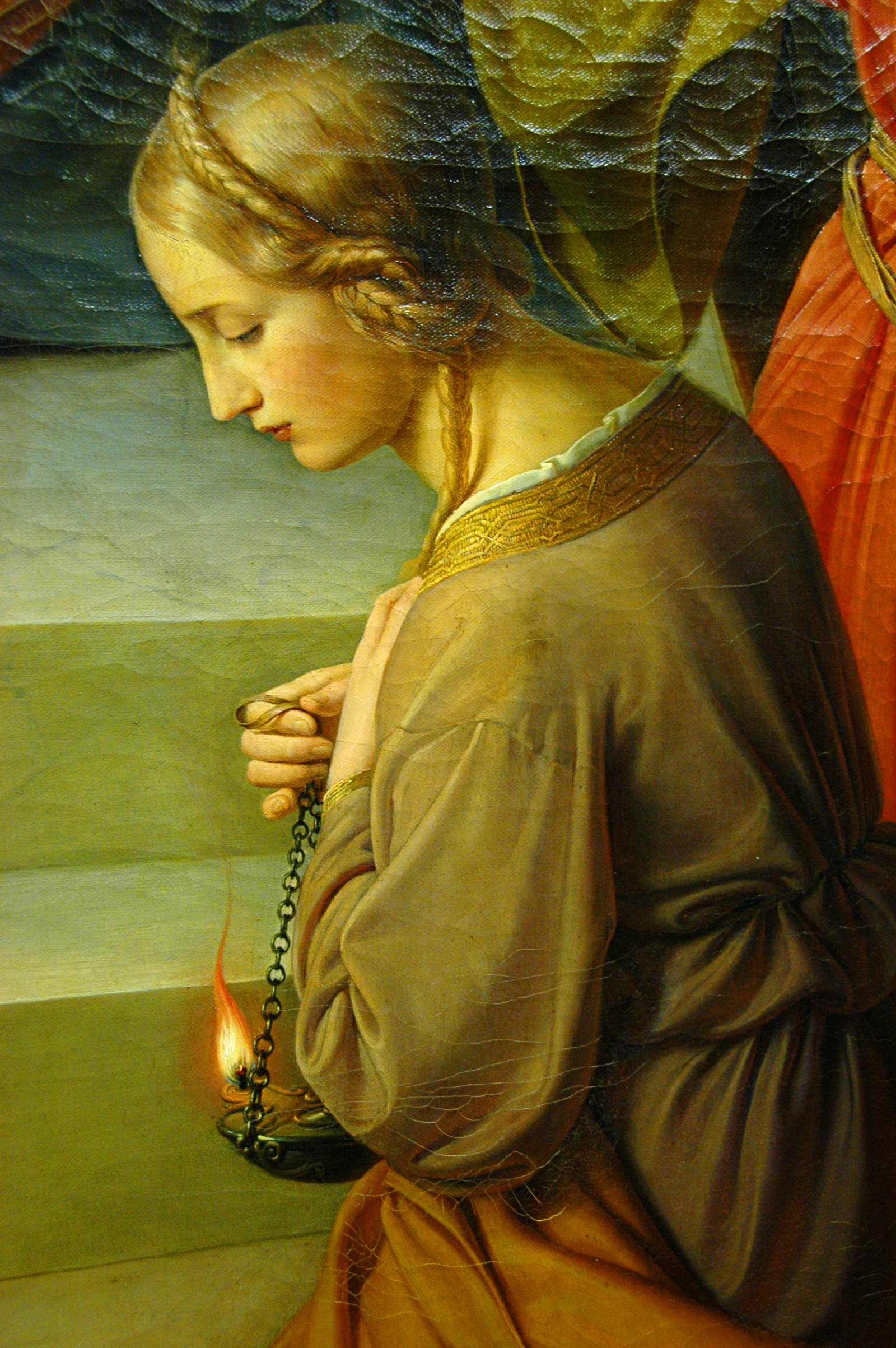
Ten (Wise and Foolish) Virgins

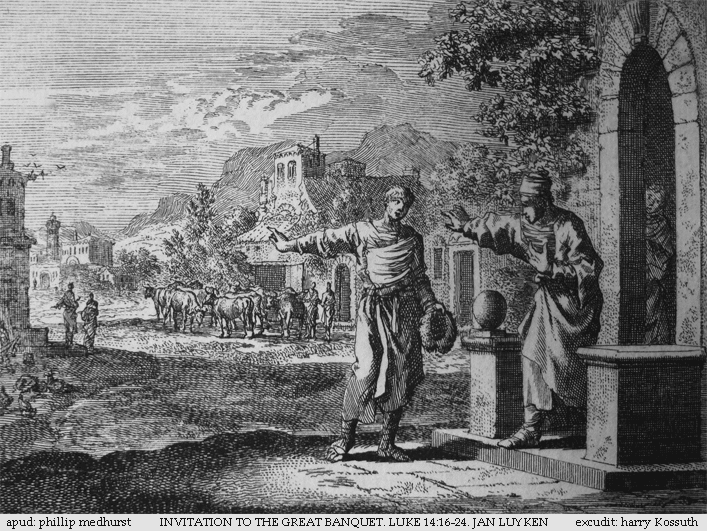
Great Banquet (Wedding Feast)

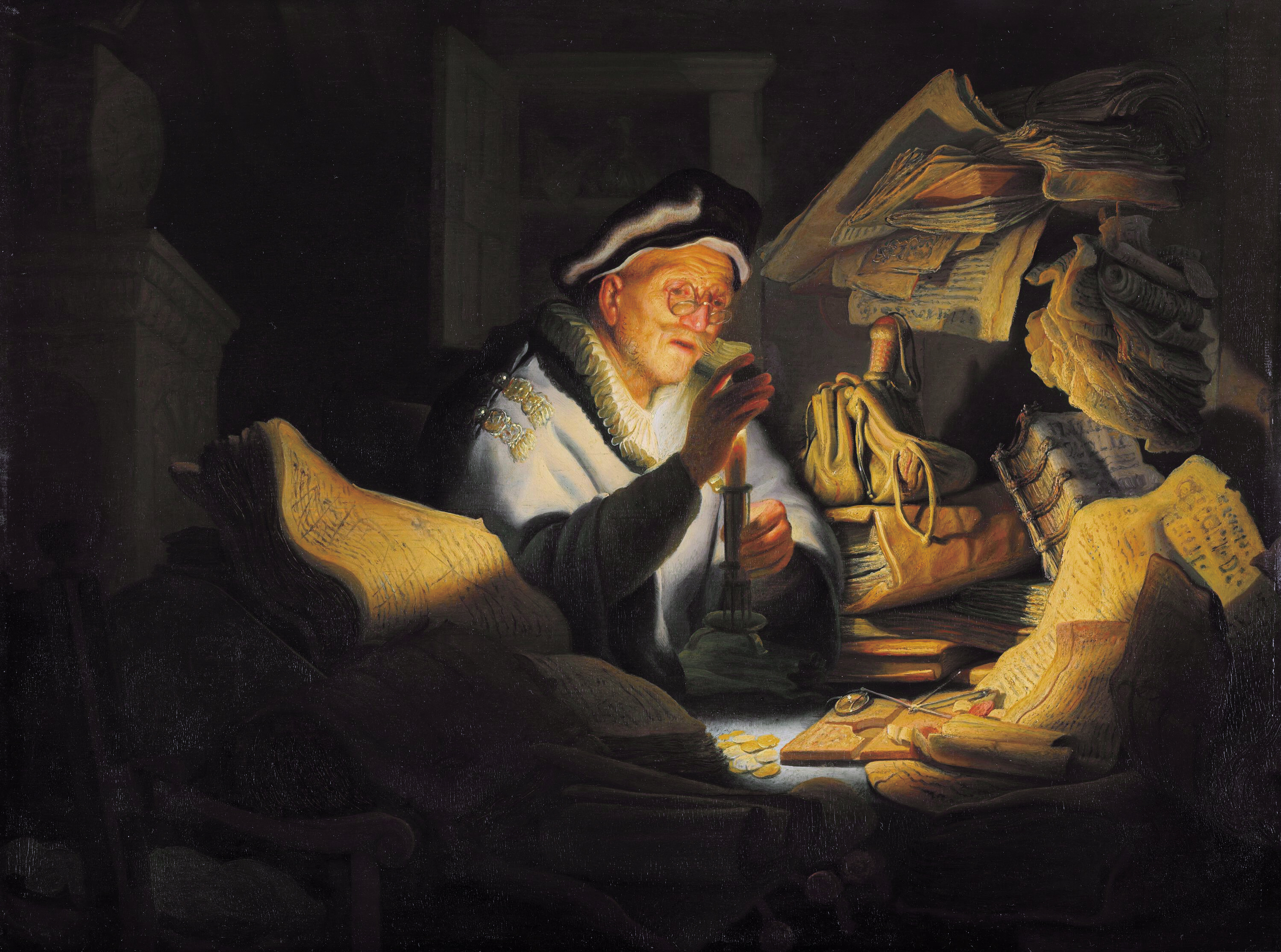
Rich Fool

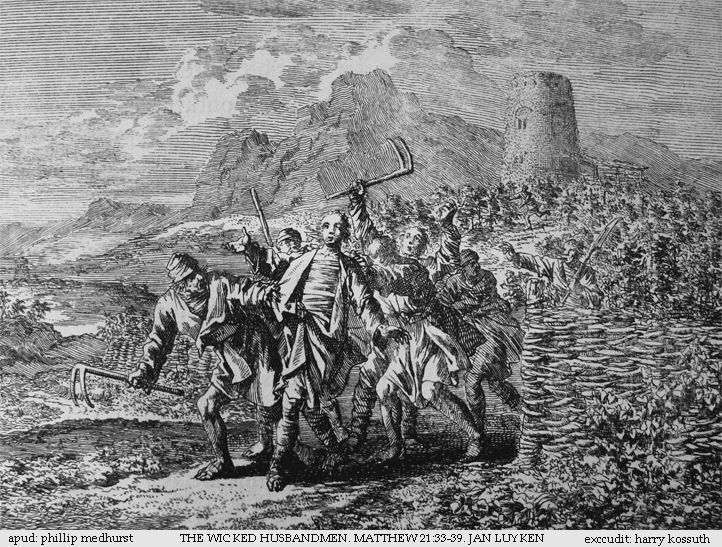
Wicked Husbandmen (Tenants in the Vineyard)

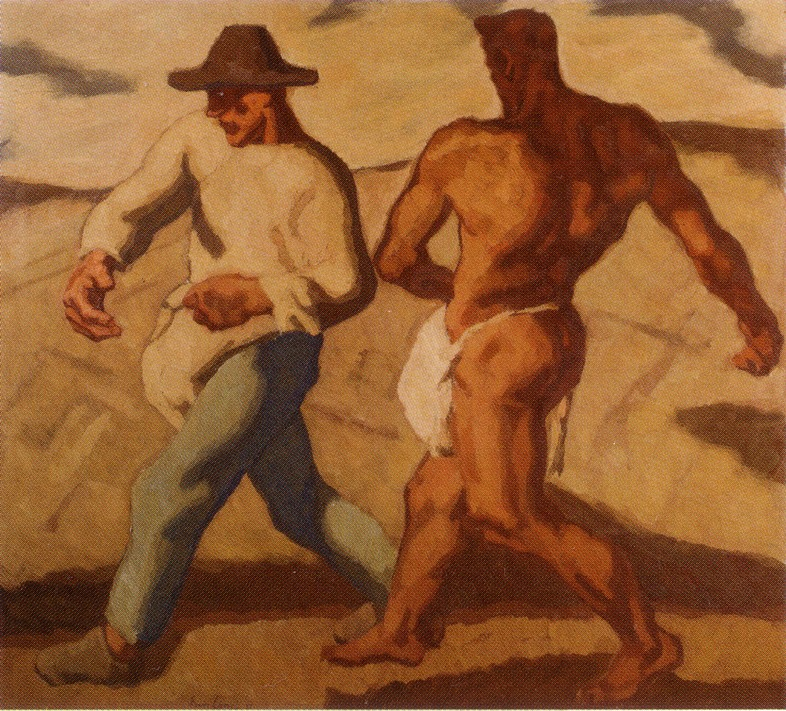
(Wheat and) Tares

Faithful Servant
Ten Virgins
Great Banquet
Rich Fool
Wicked Husbandmen
Tares

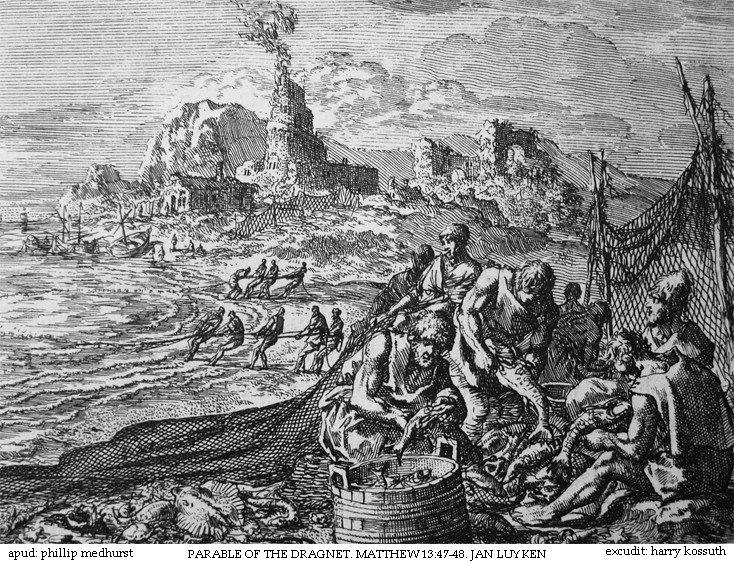
Drawing in the Net

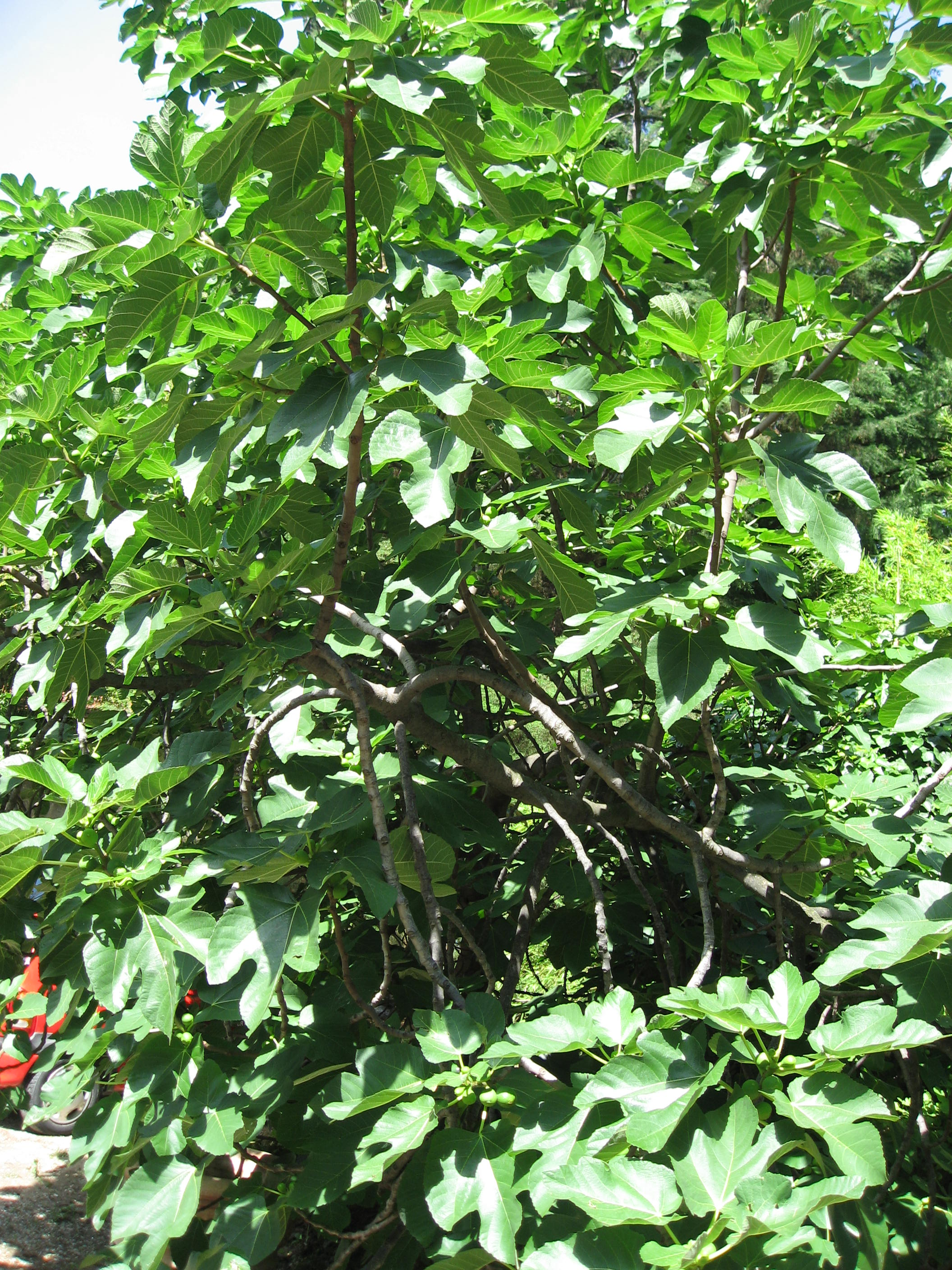
Budding Fig Tree

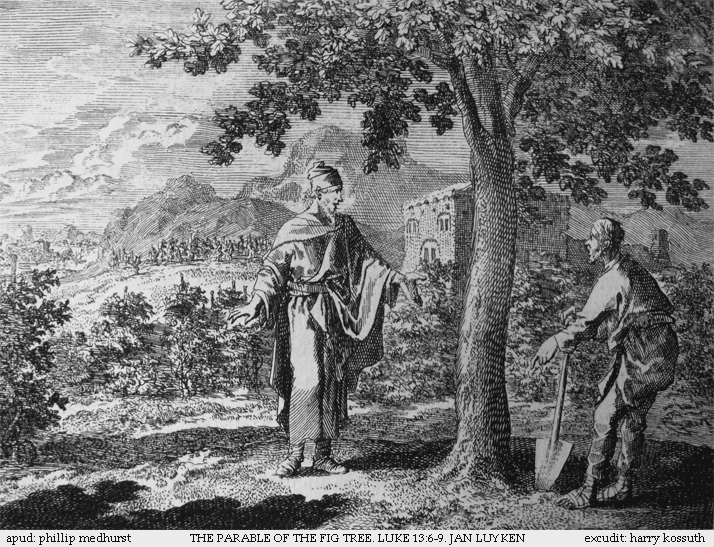
Barren Fig Tree

The Net
Budding Fig Tree
Barren Fig Tree

=== Other parables ===
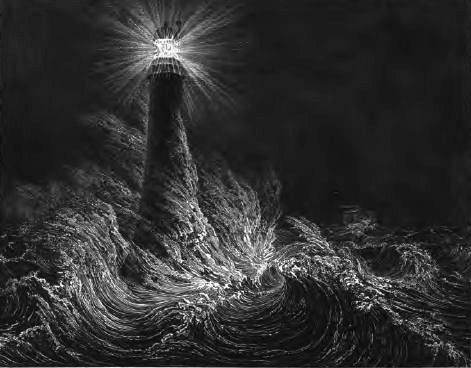
Wise and Foolish Builders (House on the Rock)

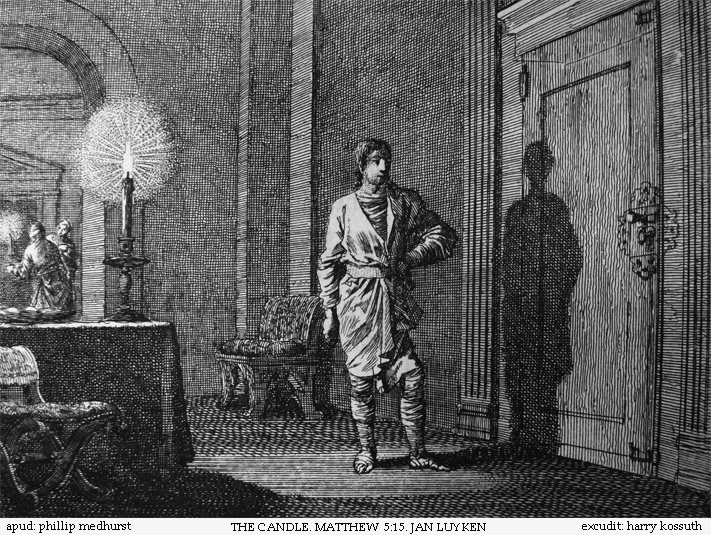
Lamp under a Bushel (Bowl, Basket)

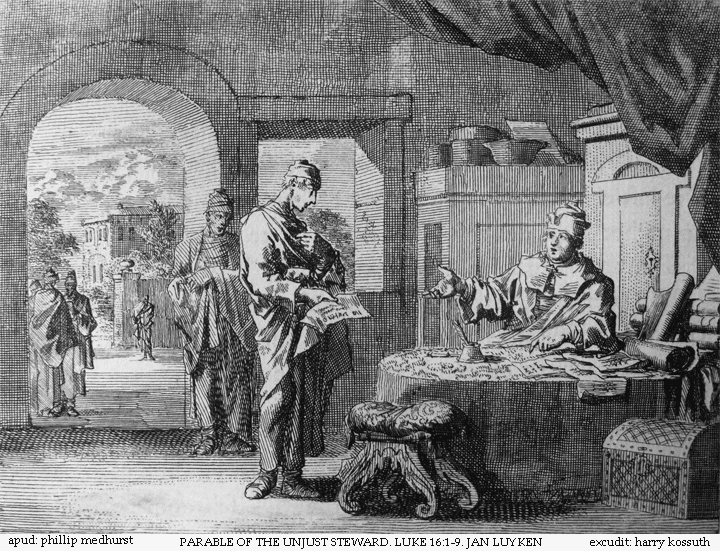
Unjust Steward (Shrewd Manager)

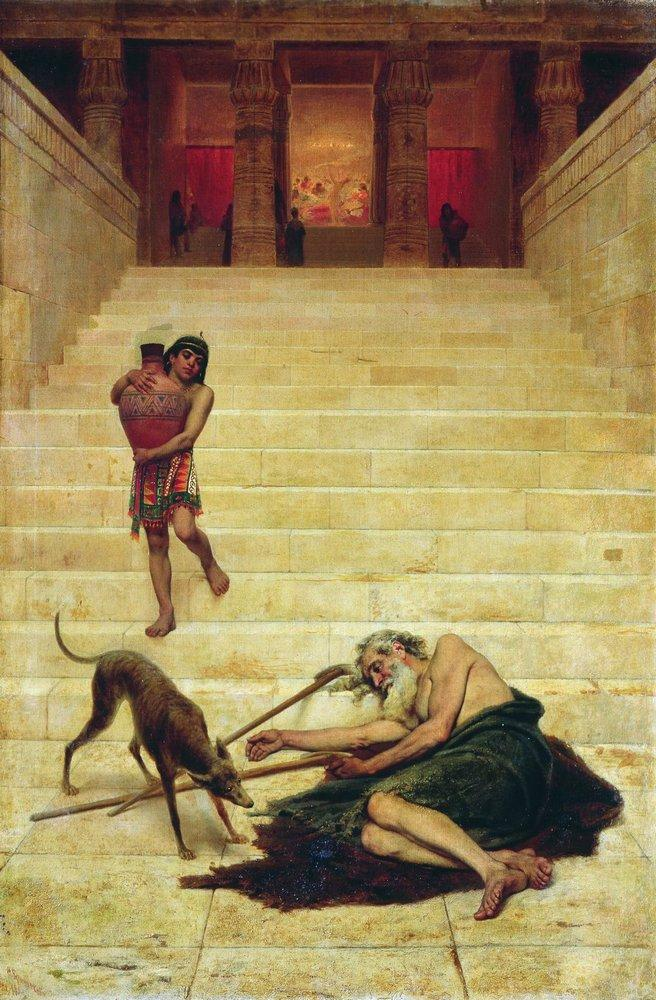
Rich Man (Dives) and Lazarus

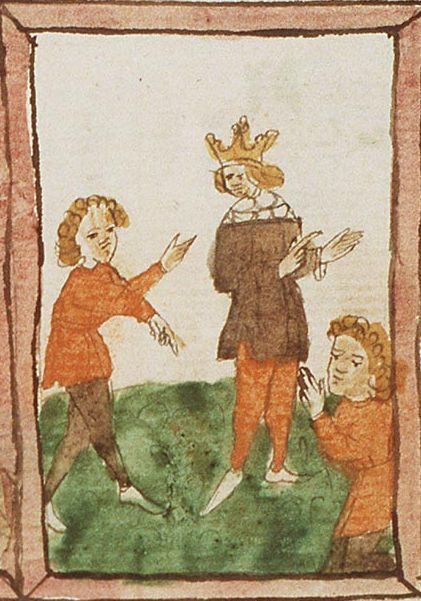
Talents (Minas)

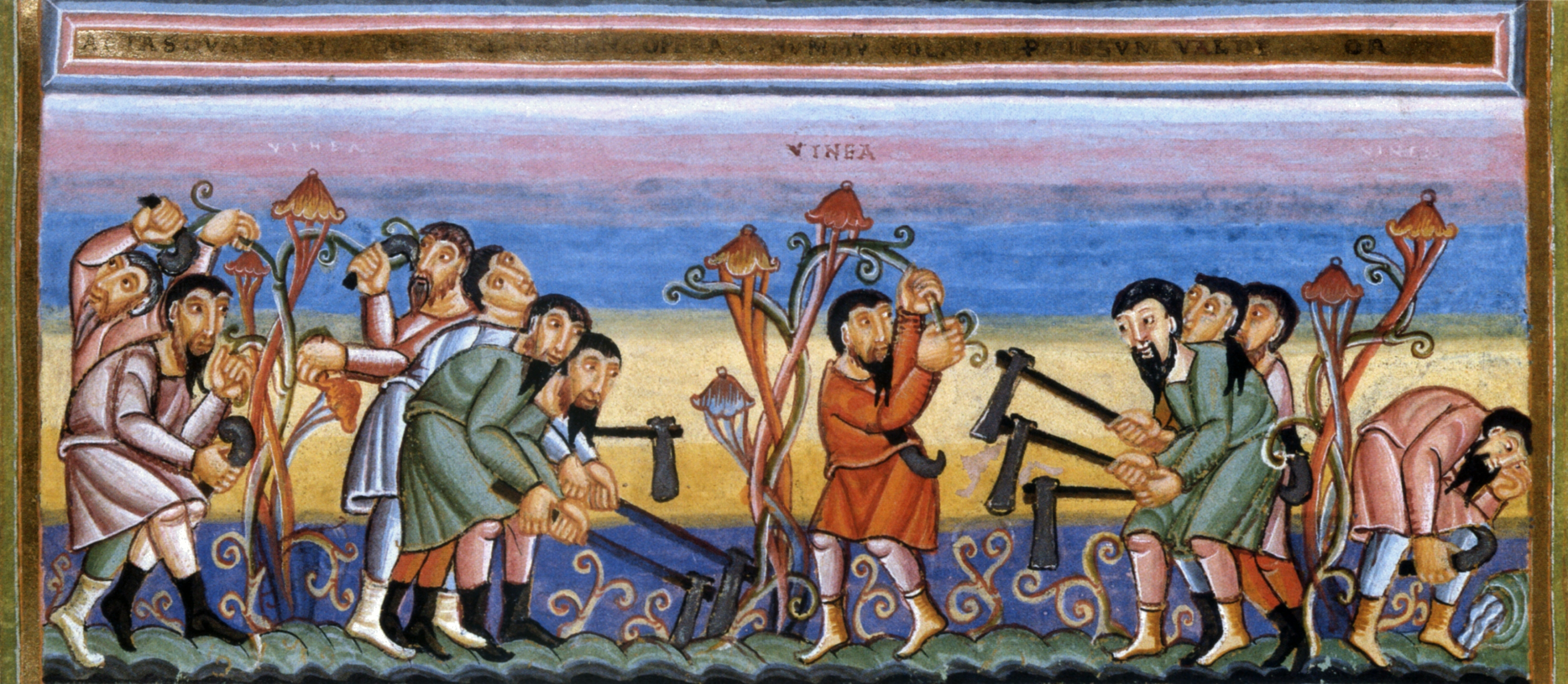
Workers in the Vineyard

Wise & Foolish Builders
Lamp under a Bushel
Unjust Steward
Rich Man and Lazarus
Talents (Minas)
Parable of the Workers in the Vineyard

== Art ==
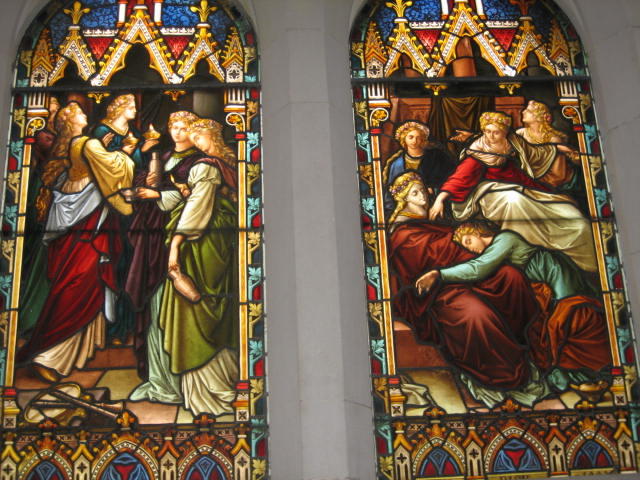
A depiction of the Parable of the Ten Virgins on a stained glass window in Scots' Church, Melbourne

Of the thirty or so parables in the canonical Gospels, four were shown in medieval art almost to the exclusion of the others, but not mixed in with the narrative scenes of the Life of Christ. These were: the Ten Virgins, the Rich man and Lazarus, the Prodigal Son and the Good Samaritan. Artists famous for depicting parables include Martin Schongauer, Pieter Bruegel the Elder and Albrecht Dürer. The Workers in the Vineyard also appears in Early Medieval works. From the Renaissance, the number of parables depicted increased slightly, and the Prodigal Son became a clear favorite, appearing in various scenes, with the Good Samaritan also being popular. Albrecht Dürer made a famous engraving of the Prodigal Son among the pigs (1496), a popular subject in the Northern Renaissance, and Rembrandt depicted the story several times, although at least one of his works, The Prodigal Son in the Tavern, a portrait of himself as the Son revelling with his wife, is like many artists' depictions, a way of dignifying a genre tavern scene. His late The Return of the Prodigal Son (Hermitage Museum, St Petersburg) is one of his most popular works. In 1857, the Brothers Dalziel commissioned John Everett Millais to illustrate the parables, and his work was published in 1864 in London.

== Poetry and hymns ==
As well as being depicted in art and discussed in prose, a number of parables form the inspiration for religious poetry and hymns. For example, the hymn "The Ninety and Nine" by Elizabeth C. Clephane (1868) is inspired by the parable of the Lost Sheep:

There were ninety and nine that safely lay
In the shelter of the fold.
But one was out on the hills away,
Far off from the gates of gold.
Away on the mountains wild and bare.
Away from the tender Shepherd's care.
Away from the tender Shepherd's care.

— Clephane 1910

Similarly, "My Hope Is Built" (Edward Mote, c. 1834) is inspired by the parable of the Wise and the Foolish Builders, and "How Kind the Good Samaritan" (John Newton, c. 1779) is inspired by the parable of the Good Samaritan.

== Harmony of parables ==
A sample gospel harmony for the parables based on the list of key episodes in the Canonical Gospels is presented in the table below. For the sake of consistency, this table is automatically sub-selected from the main harmony table in the Gospel harmony article, based on the list of key episodes in the Canonical Gospels. Usually, no parables are associated with the Gospel of John, just allegories.

Number	Event	Matthew	Mark	Luke	John
1	The Wise and the Foolish Builders	Matthew 7:24–27		Luke 6:46–49	
2	New Wine into Old Wineskins	Matthew 9:16–17	Mark 2:21–22	Luke 5:37–39	
3	The Strong Man	Matthew 12:29	Mark 3:27	Luke 11:21–22	
4	The Two Debtors			Luke 7:41–43	
5	The Sower	Matthew 13:3–9	Mark 4:3–9	Luke 8:5–8	
6	The Lamp Under a Bushel	Matthew 5:14–15	Mark 4:21–25	Luke 8:16–18	
7	The Growing Seed		Mark 4:26–29		
8	The Tares	Matthew 13:24–30			
9	The Good Samaritan			Luke 10:25–37	
10	The Friend at Night			Luke 11:5–8	
11	The Rich Fool			Luke 12:16–21	
12	The Barren Fig Tree			Luke 13:6–9	
13	The Mustard Seed	Matthew 13:31–32	Mark 4:30–32	Luke 13:18–19	
14	The Leaven	Matthew 13:33		Luke 13:20–21	
15	The Hidden Treasure	Matthew 13:44			
16	The Pearl	Matthew 13:45–46			
17	Drawing in the Net	Matthew 13:47–50			
18	The Householder's Treasure (Scribe)	Matthew 13:51–52			
19	The Wedding Feast			Luke 14:7–14	
20	Counting the Cost			Luke 14:28–33	
21	The Lost Sheep	Matthew 18:10–14		Luke 15:4–6	
22	The Unforgiving Servant	Matthew 18:23–35			
23	The Lost Coin			Luke 15:8–9	
24	The Prodigal Son			Luke 15:11–32	
25	The Unjust Steward			Luke 16:1–13	
26	The Rich Man and Lazarus			Luke 16:19–31	
27	The Master and Servant			Luke 17:7–10	
28	The Unjust Judge			Luke 18:1–8	
29	The Pharisee and the Publican			Luke 18:9–14	
30	The Workers in the Vineyard	Matthew 20:1–16			
31	The Two Sons	Matthew 21:28–32			
32	The Wicked Husbandmen	Matthew 21:33–41	Mark 12:1–9	Luke 20:9–16	
33	The Great Banquet	Matthew 22:1–14		Luke 14:15–24	
34	The Budding Fig Tree	Matthew 24:32–35	Mark 13:28–31	Luke 21:29–33	
35	The Faithful Servant	Matthew 24:42–51	Mark 13:34–37	Luke 12:35–48	
36	The Ten Virgins	Matthew 25:1–13			
37	The Talents or Minas	Matthew 25:14–30		Luke 19:12–27	
38	The Sheep and the Goats	Matthew 25:31–46			

=== Parallels outside the canonical gospels ===
A number of parables have parallels in non-canonical gospels, the Didache, and the letters of Apostolic Fathers. However, given that the non-canonical gospels generally have no time sequence, this table is not a gospel harmony.

#	Parable	Matthew	Mark	Luke	Other parallels
3	The Strong Man	Matthew 12:29	Mark 3:27	Luke 11:21–22	Thomas 35
5	The Sower	Matthew 13:1–23	Mark 4:1–25	Luke 8:4–18	Thomas 9; 1 Clement 24:5
6	The Growing Seed		Mark 4:26–29		Thomas 21
7	The Tares	Matthew 13:24–30			Thomas 57
11	The Rich Fool			Luke 12:16–21	Thomas 63
13	The Mustard Seed	Matthew 13:31–32	Mark 4:30–32	Luke 13:18–19	Thomas 20
14	The Leaven	Matthew 13:33		Luke 13:20–21	Thomas 96
15	The Hidden Treasure	Matthew 13:44			Thomas 109
16	The Pearl	Matthew 13:45			Thomas 76
17	Drawing in the Net	Matthew 13:47–53			Thomas 8
20	The Lost Sheep	Matthew 18:12–14		Luke 15:1–7	Thomas 107; Gospel of Truth 31–32
31	The Wicked Husbandmen	Matthew 21:33–46	Mark 12:1–12	Luke 20:9–19	Thomas 65
32	The Great Banquet	Matthew 22:1–14		Luke 14:15–24	Thomas 64
34	The Faithful Servant	Matthew 24:42–51	Mark 13:33–37	Luke 12:35–48	Thomas 103; Didache 16:1a
36	The Talents or Minas	Matthew 25:14–30		Luke 19:13–24	Nazoraeans 18

=== Parables noted in the Catholic Encyclopedia of 1913 ===
Parable Title	Matthew	Mark	Luke
The Sower	Matthew 13:3–8	Mark 4:3–8	Luke 8:5–8
The Tares or Cockle	Matthew 13:24–30		
The Mustard Seed	Matthew 13:31–32	Mark 4:31–32	Luke 13:18–19
The Leaven	Matthew 13:33		Luke 13:20–21
The Hidden Treasure	Matthew 13:44		
The Pearl of Price	Matthew 13:45		
The Draw Net	Matthew 13:47–50		
The Unmerciful Servant	Matthew 18:21–35		
The Labourers in the Vineyard	Matthew 20:1–16		
The Two Sons	Matthew 21:28–32		
The Wicked Husbandmen	Matthew 21:33–45	Mark 12:1–12	Luke 20:9–19
The Marriage of the King's Son	Matthew 22:1–14		
The Ten Virgins	Matthew 25:1–13		
The Talents	Matthew 25:14–30		
The Pounds or the Minae			Luke 19:11–27
The Two Debtors			Luke 7:41–43
The Good Samaritan			Luke 10:37
The Friend at Midnight			Luke 11:5–8
The Unjust Judge			Luke 18:1–8
The Rich Fool			Luke 12:16–21
Dives and Lazarus			Luke 16:19–31
The Great Supper			Luke 14:15–24
The Prodigal Son			Luke 15:11–32
The Unjust Steward			Luke 16:1–9
The Unprofitable Servants			Luke 17:7–10
The Pharisee and the Publican			Luke 18:9–14

== See also ==
- Chronology of Jesus
- Gospel harmony
- Jesus in Christianity
- Life of Jesus in the New Testament
- Ministry of Jesus
- Miracles of Jesus
- The Tares
