= Parable of the Master and Servant =

Parable taught by Jesus of Nazareth according to the Christian Gospel of Mark

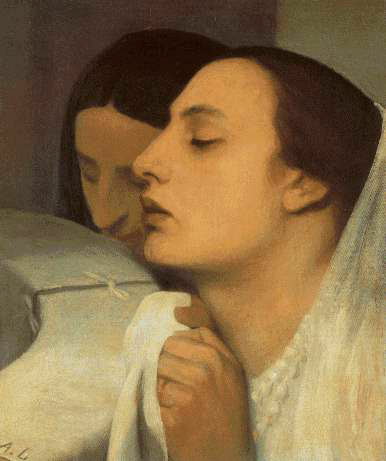
The prayer of Thanksgiving after Communion by Thomas Aquinas includes a phrase similar to the last verse of this parable: I thank You, O holy Lord, almighty Father, eternal God, who have deigned, not through any merits of mine, but out of the condescension of Your goodness, to satisfy me a sinner, Your unworthy servant. (Painting by Alphonse Legros)

The Parable of the Master and Servant also known as the Parable of the Unworthy Servant or the Parable of the Unprofitable Servant is a parable told by Jesus in the New Testament, found only in Luke's Gospel (Luke 17:7–10). The parable teaches that when somebody "has done what God expects, he or she is only doing his or her duty."

== Narrative ==
The parable reads as follows:

But who is there among you, having a servant plowing or keeping sheep, that will say, when he comes in from the field, "Come immediately and sit down at the table," and will not rather tell him, "Prepare my supper, clothe yourself properly, and serve me, while I eat and drink. Afterward you shall eat and drink"? Does he thank that servant because he did the things that were commanded? I think not. Even so you also, when you have done all the things that are commanded you, say, "We are unworthy servants. We have done our duty."

— Luke 17:7-10, World English Bible

== Interpretation ==
This parable suggests that "even the best of God's servants are still unworthy because they have only done their duty and no more." Nobody, "no matter how virtuous or hardworking, can ever put God in his or her debt."

William Barclay relates the parable to the last verse of the Isaac Watts hymn "When I Survey the Wondrous Cross":

Were the whole realm of Nature mine,
That were an offering far too small;
Love so amazing, so divine,
Demands my soul, my life, my all.

The phrase "unworthy servant" in the last verse of the parable is widely used liturgically, such as in the Liturgy of St. John Chrysostom.

Scottish biblical writer William Nicoll refers to this story as "the parable of extra service".

== See also ==
- Life of Jesus in the New Testament
- Ministry of Jesus
- Parable of the Two Debtors
- Parable of the Faithful Servant
