= Parable of the Unforgiving Servant =

Parable taught by Jesus of Nazareth according to the Christian Gospel of Matthew

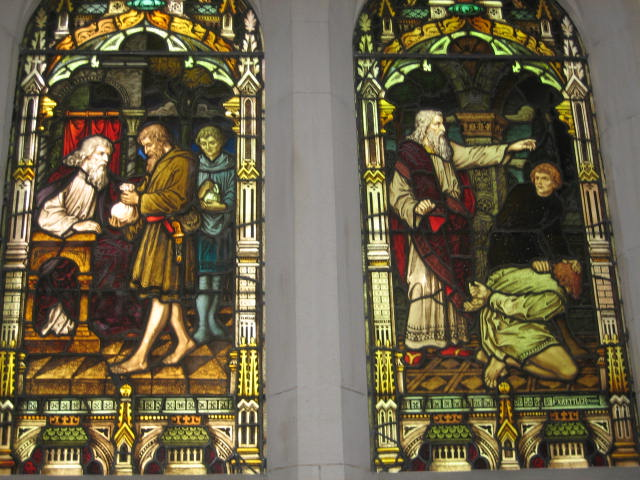
This depiction of the Parable of the Unforgiving Servant on a stained glass window in Scots' Church, Melbourne shows the initial forgiving of the debt, and the final punishment of the unforgiving servant.

The Parable of the Unforgiving Servant (also known as Unforgiving Creditor, Ungrateful Servant, Unmerciful Servant, or Wicked Servant but not to be confused with the parable of the Two Debtors) is a parable of Jesus which appears in the Gospel of Matthew. According to Matthew 18:21–35 it is important to forgive others as we are forgiven by God, as illustrated by the negative example of the unforgiving servant.

== Narrative ==
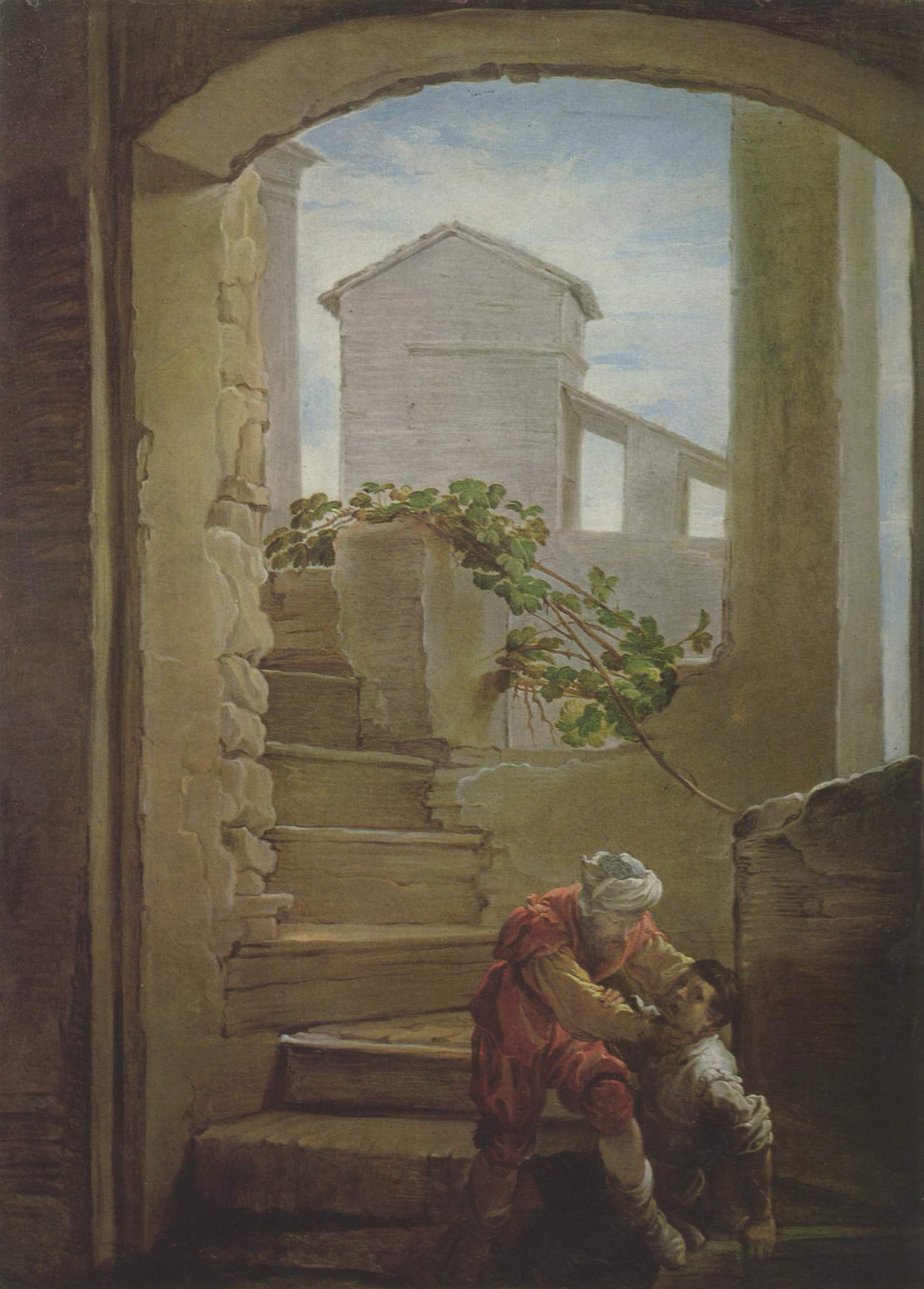
This depiction by Domenico Fetti (c. 1620) shows the unforgiving servant choking the other debtor.

The parable is told as an answer to a question by Peter about forgiveness:

Then Peter came and said to him, "Lord, how often shall my brother sin against me, and I forgive him? Until seven times?"

Jesus said to him, "I don't tell you until seven times, but, until seventy times seven. Therefore the Kingdom of Heaven is like a certain king, who wanted to reconcile accounts with his servants. When he had begun to reconcile, one was brought to him who owed him ten thousand talents. But because he couldn't pay, his lord commanded him to be sold, with his wife, his children, and all that he had, and payment to be made. The servant therefore fell down and knelt before him, saying, 'Lord, have patience with me, and I will repay you all!' The lord of that servant, being moved with compassion, released him, and forgave him the debt.

"But that servant went out, and found one of his fellow servants, who owed him one hundred denarii, and he grabbed him, and took him by the throat, saying, 'Pay me what you owe!'

"So his fellow servant fell down at his feet and begged him, saying, 'Have patience with me, and I will repay you!' He would not, but went and cast him into prison, until he should pay back that which was due. So when his fellow servants saw what was done, they were exceedingly sorry, and came and told to their lord all that was done. Then his lord called him in, and said to him, 'You wicked servant! I forgave you all that debt, because you begged me. Shouldn't you also have had mercy on your fellow servant, even as I had mercy on you?' His lord was angry, and delivered him to the tormentors, until he should pay all that was due to him. So my heavenly Father will also do to you, if you don't each forgive your brother from your hearts for his misdeeds."

Matthew 18:21–35

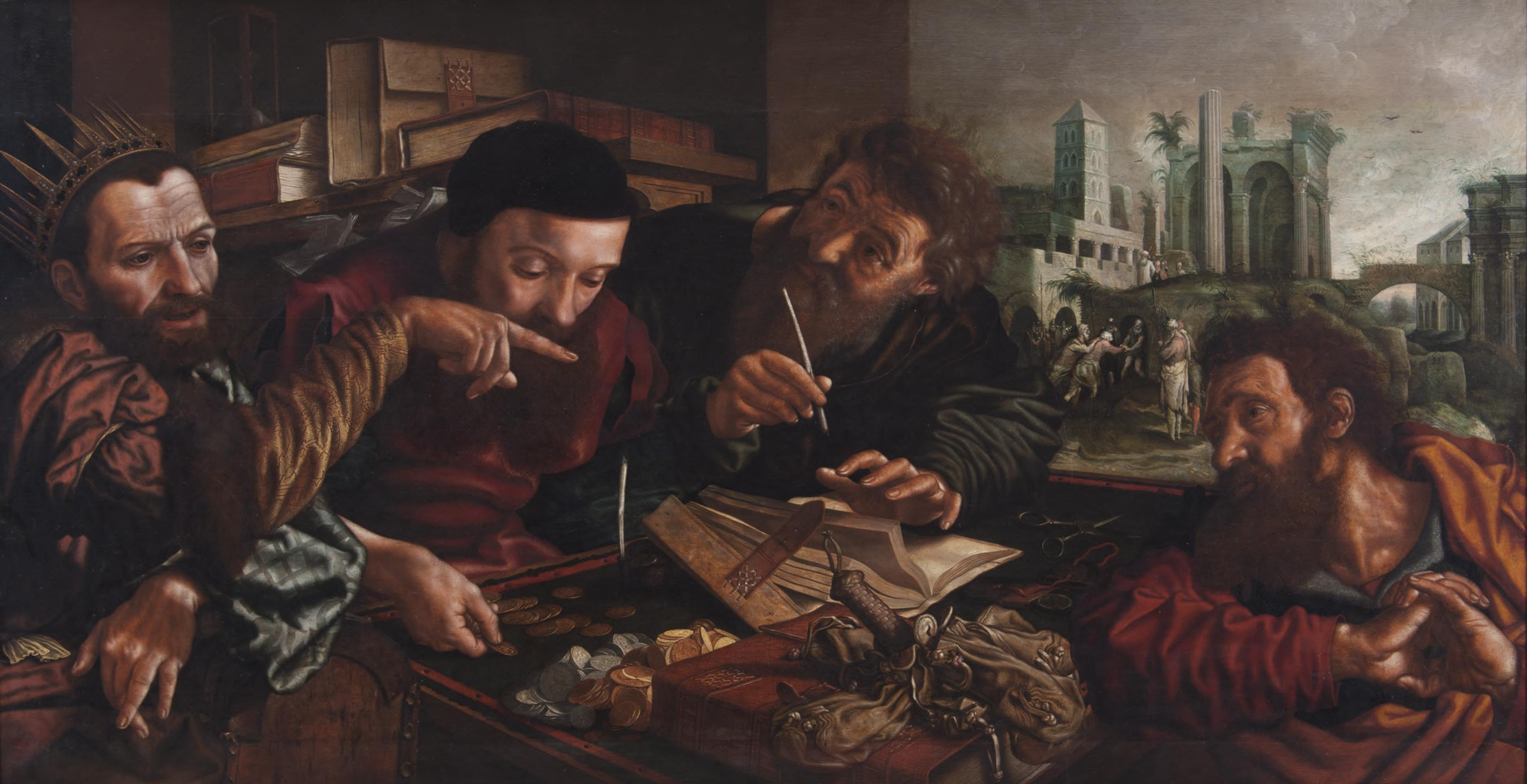
This depiction by Jan van Hemessen (c. 1556) shows the moment when the king scolds the servant.

The lines before the parable itself are similar to Luke 17:3–4.

The talent in this parable was worth about 6,000 denarii, so that one debt is 600,000 times as large as the other. More significantly, 10,000 (a myriad) was the highest Greek numeral, and a talent the largest unit of currency, so that 10,000 talents was the largest easily described debt (for comparison, the combined annual tribute of Judea, Samaria, and Idumea around this time was only 600 talents, and one denarius was a day's wages, so that 10,000 talents would be about 200,000 years' wages). The setting is the court of some king in another country, where the "servants" could rank as highly as provincial governors.

== Historical context ==
There is no precedent in the scriptures of the Bible for a debtor paying debts from prison. However, there is a very relevant aspect of Roman law that may have been the cultural reference this parable is built around considering the Judeans of Jesus day were ruled by Rome. In the Roman Constitution known as the Laws of the 12 Tables (Table III, Laws IV-X), there is a detailed set of laws on debtors that shows a great deal of similarity to the scenario in the parable. A debtor who does not pay can be taken to court and put in chains and forced into a number of arrangements whereby they work off the debt through servitude. Also it states that others can come and pay the debt on their behalf, thus releasing them from prison. A debt that cannot be paid resulted in slavery to the creditor or sale on the slave market.

== Commentary ==
Cornelius a Lapide comments on the phrase "was wroth" or "was angry". The Syriac text reads that the Lord "burnt with anger". Lapide notes that under Roman civil law, to which the Jews of Christ's time were subject, debtors sometimes were delivered by their creditors to tormentors, who put them in prison, and scourged them. The Emperor Constantine the Great, from Christian kindness, ended the punishment of scourging debtors. Remigius says that in this case the tormentors are demons, who torment the souls of the damned in hell in a thousand ways, where the phrase until he should pay means that they must be tormented forever, because they could never pay the full debt of ten thousand talents. John Chrysostom, Euthymius the Great and Theophylact of Ohrid give the same interpretation.

Concerning the phrase, unless you forgive from your hearts at the end of the parable, John McEvilly writes that outward forgiveness is useless, but instead it must come from the "heart", with the threat of being refused forgiveness by God if we do not forgive. Similarly St. James writes, "For judgement will be without mercy to anyone who has shown no mercy" (James 2:13).

== Depictions ==
There have been numerous depictions of this parable in art, including:

- Domenico Fetti, Parable of the Wicked Servant (c. 1620), Gemäldegalerie, Berlin
- Claude Vignon, Parable of the Unforgiving Servant (1629), Musée des Beaux-Arts de Tours
- Willem Drost, The Unmerciful Servant (1655), Wallace Collection, London
- John Everett Millais, The Unmerciful Servant (1864), Tate Collection
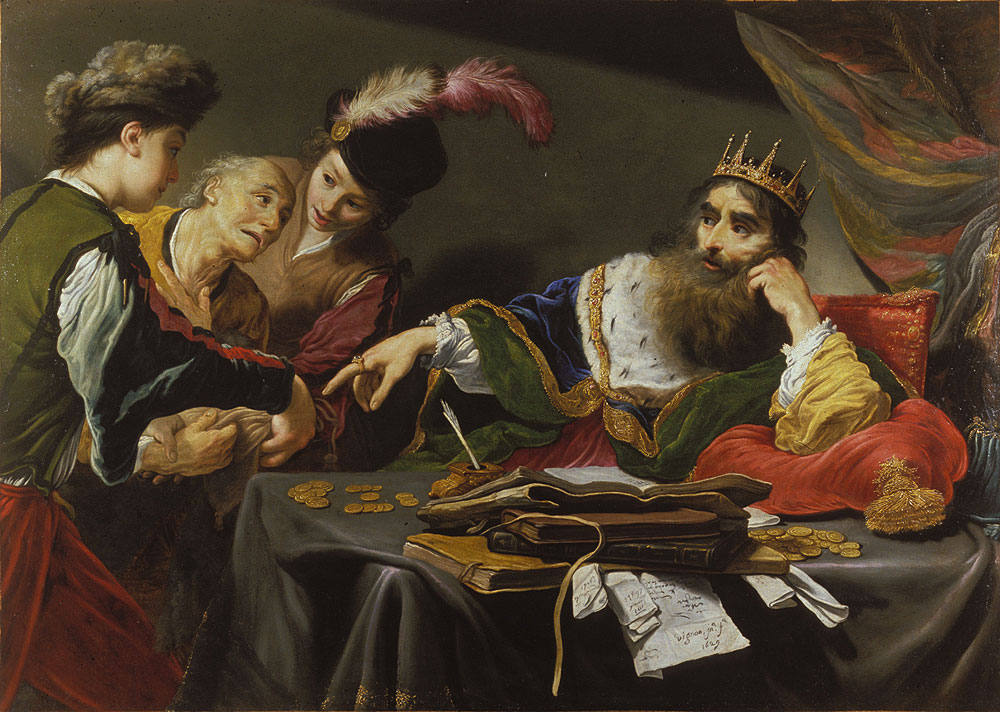
Claude Vignon, Parable of the Unforgiving Servant

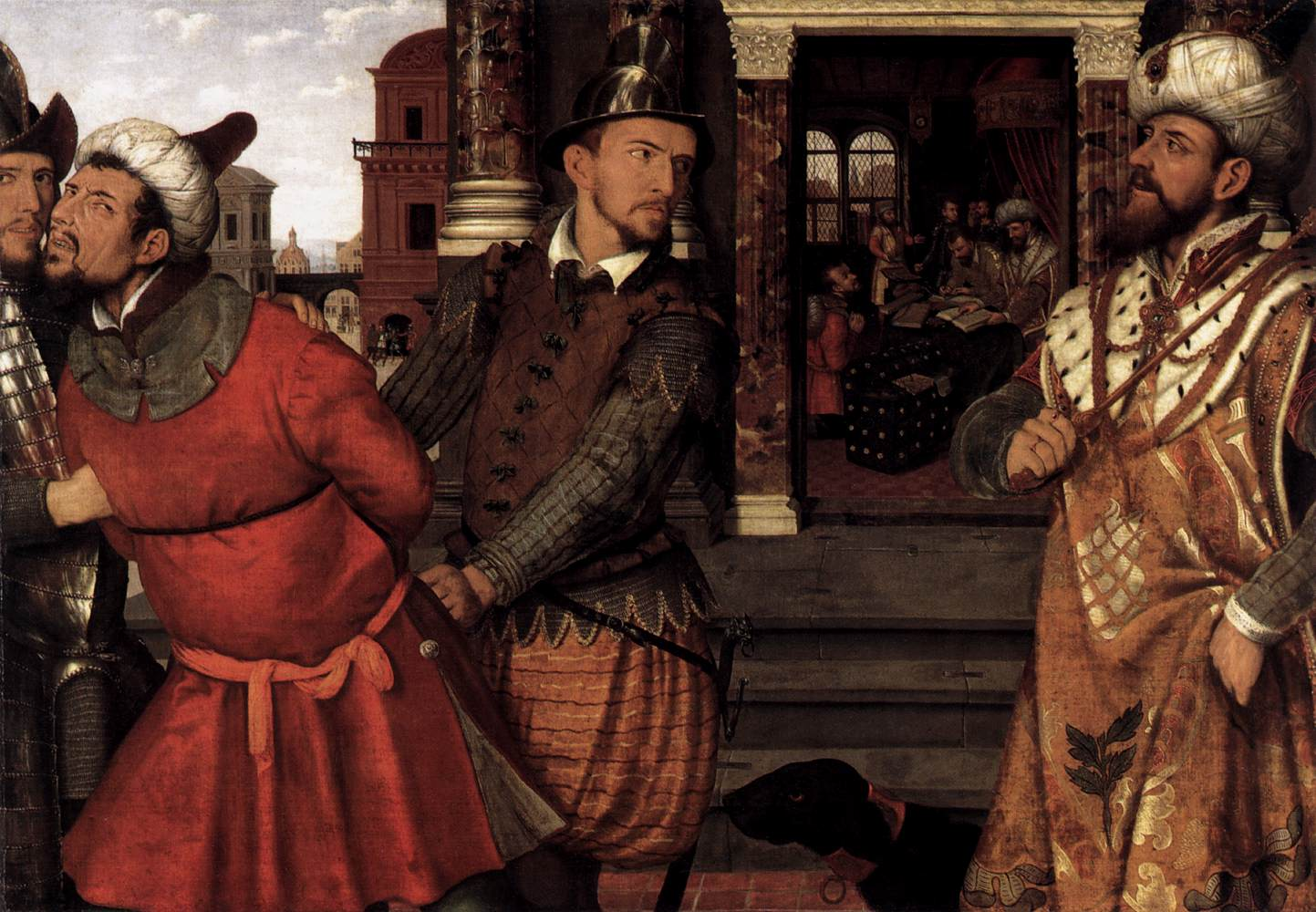
North German, c. 1560

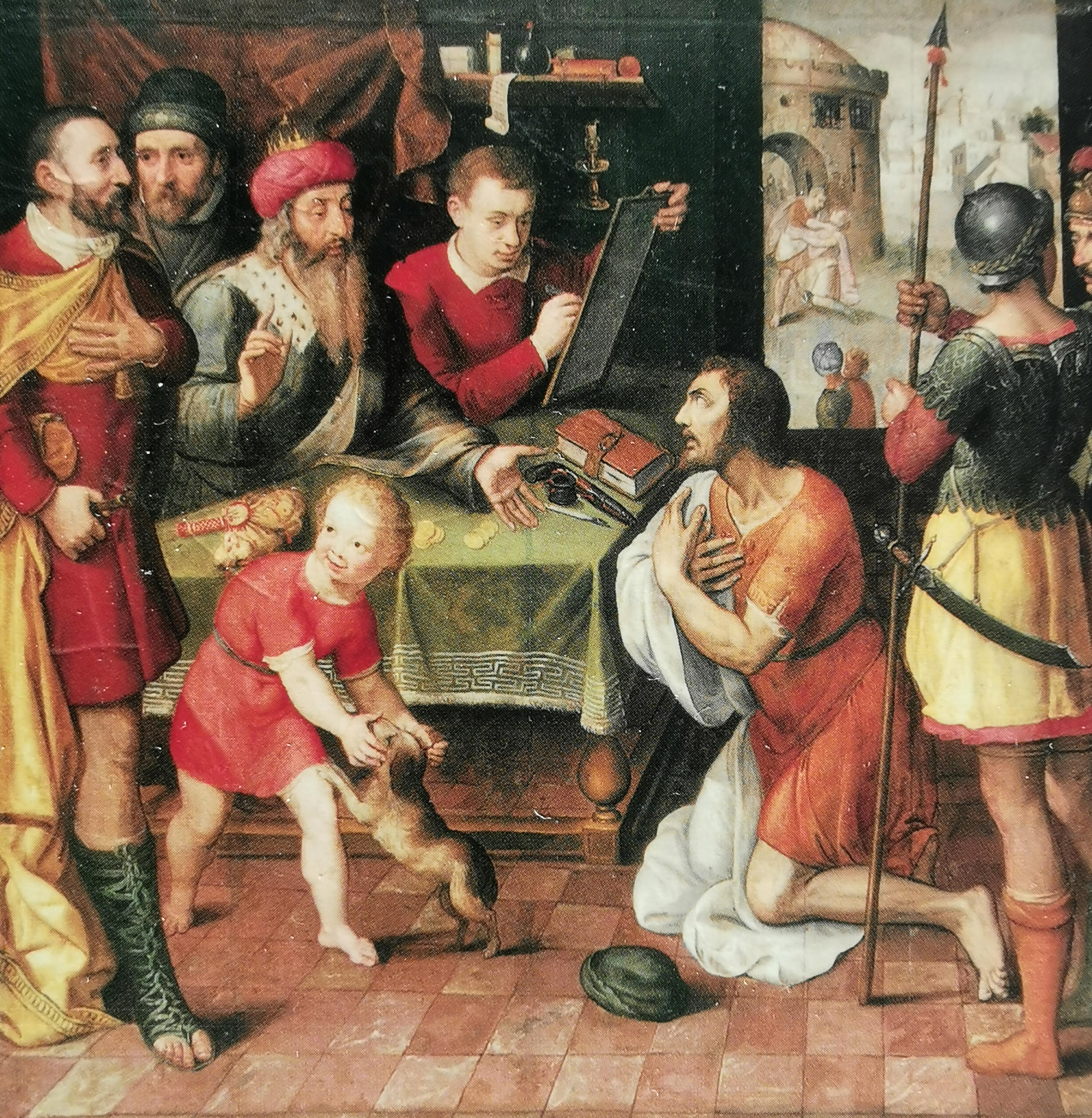
Pieter Pourbus, The Unmerciful Servant

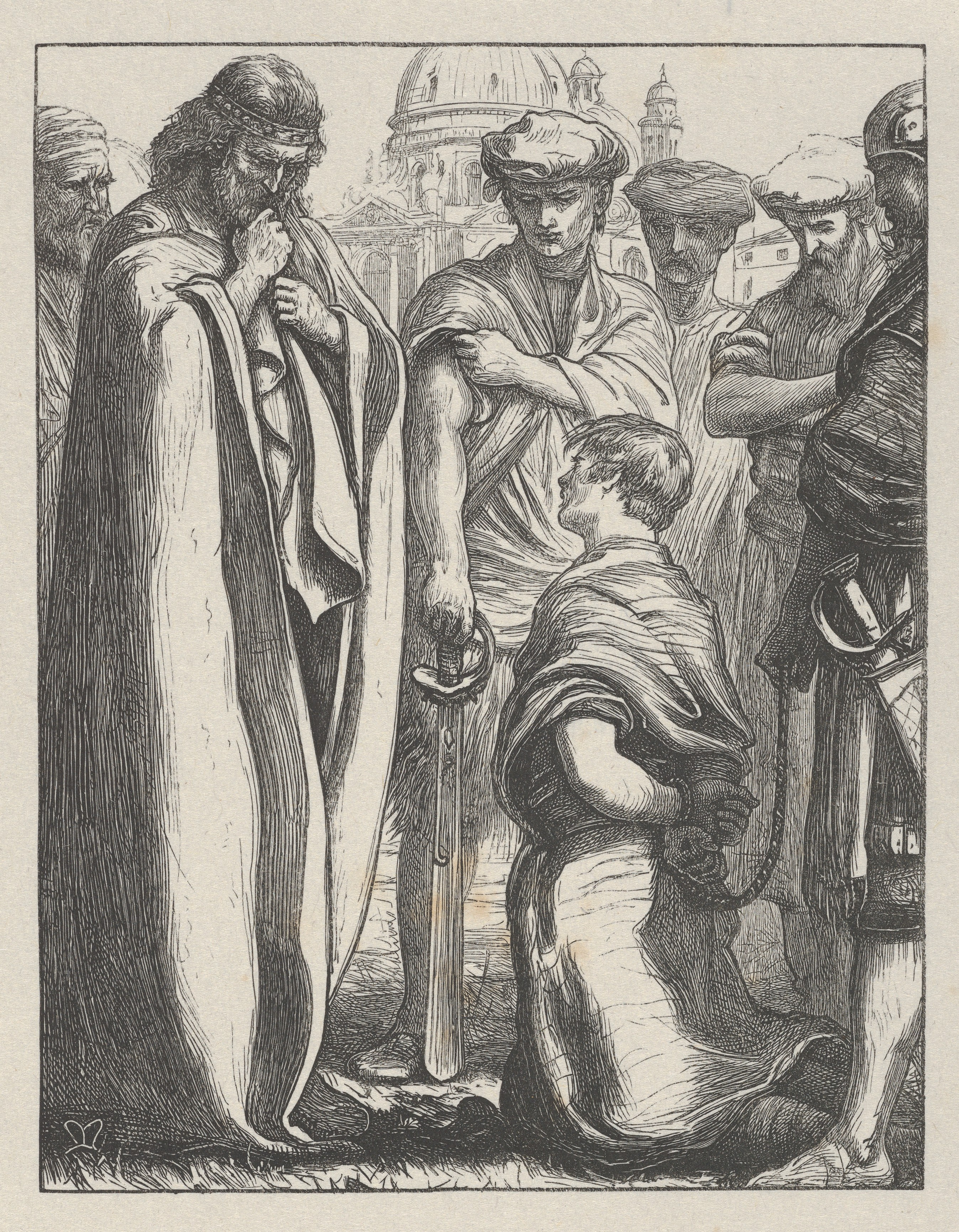
John Everett Millais, The Unmerciful Servant

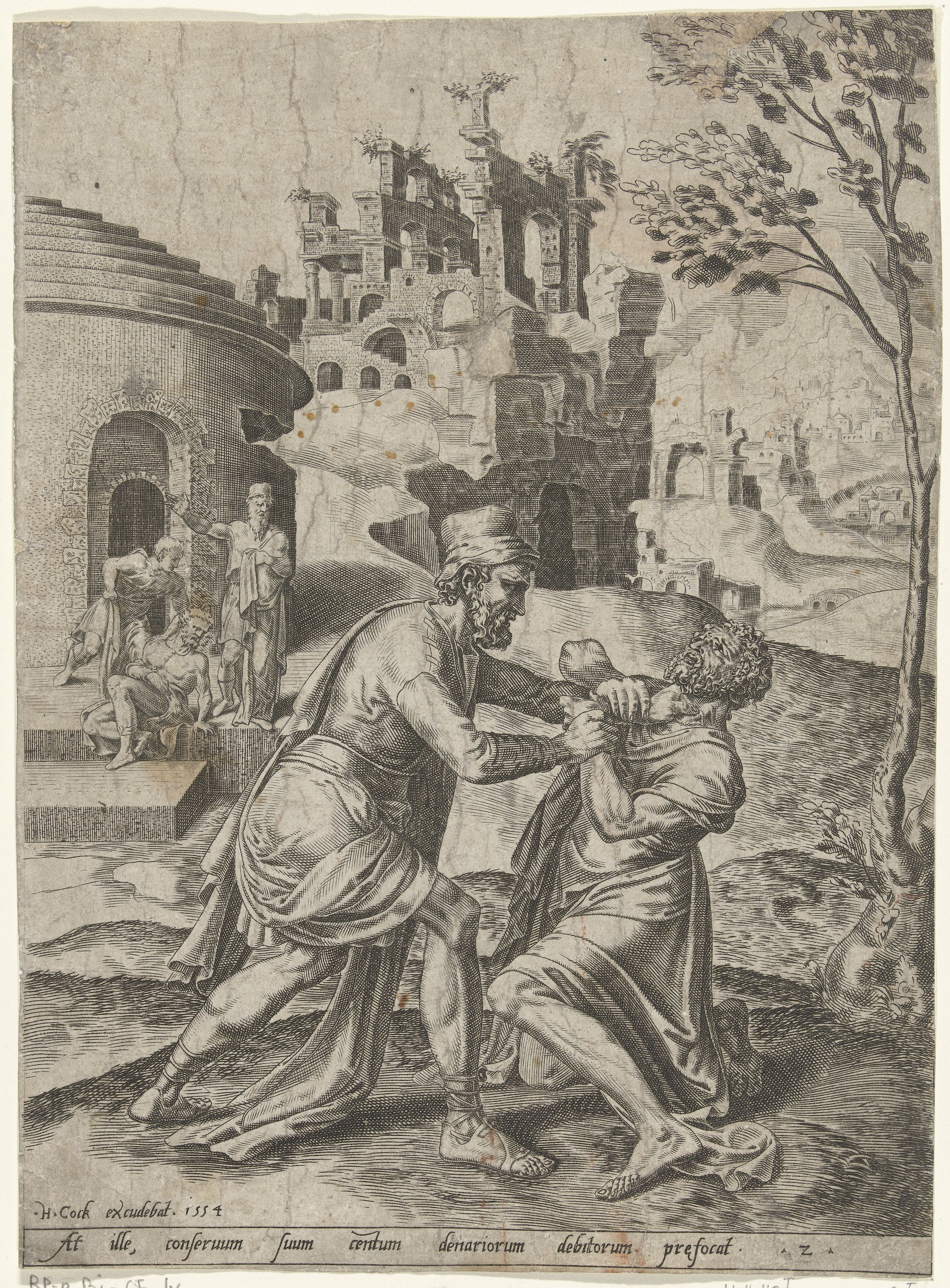
Dirck Volckertsz. Coornhert after a design by Maarten van Heemskerck; publisher Hieronymus Cock

== Literary References ==
In Stephen King’s novel Misery, a former nurse and serial killer named Annie Wilkes kindnaps an author named Paul Sheldon and keeps him locked in a room to write novels for her. She discovers that he has left the room numerous times. When she interrogates him about this, she says, “Because the principle doesn’t change if you were out seven times, or seventy, or seventy times seven.” Then she decides to amputate his leg to hobble him.

== See also ==
- Five Discourses of Matthew
- Life of Jesus in the New Testament
- Ministry of Jesus
- Was soll ich aus dir machen, Ephraim, BWV 89
