= Parable of a scribe =

Parable taught by Jesus of Nazareth according to the Christian Gospel of Matthew

The Parable of a scribe is one of the Parables of Jesus. It appears in the Gospel of Matthew, chapter 13, verses 51–53. This parable is as follows: "Then He said to them, “Therefore every scribe instructed concerning the kingdom of heaven is like a householder who brings out of his treasure things new and old."New King James Version.

== Interpretation ==
This parable is the final one in the chapter of Matthew 13. It tells of a Jew or a Hebrew Scribe who is converted to Christianity. This parable, like the rest of the parables in Matthew 13, describes the Kingdom of Heaven as the Church or the body of Christ. Here an Old Testament scribe who is converted to Christianity is compared to a house owner who brings out old and new things from his household. As we can understand from the passage, the scribe is the house owner. The difficulty is around the phrase "new and old". This can be interpreted as the new and old testaments in the bible. As a scribe who rewrites the Torah knows it better than anyone, so when he became a disciple of the New Testament or the teachings of Jesus, he will be able teach from both the old and new testaments. This parable also gives a hint that studying the old testament only would not make a person to go to heaven. If one longs to be a true Christian he needs to study the new testament also.
