= Parable of the assassin =

Parable taught by Jesus of Nazareth according to the non-canonical Gospel of Thomas

The Parable of the [Wise] Assassin (also known as the Parable of the Killer), is a parable attributed to Jesus. However, it appears in none of the Canonical gospels of the New Testament but only in the non-canonical Gospel of Thomas. According to the Gospel of Thomas 98 Jesus said:

The kingdom of the father is like a certain man who wanted to kill a powerful man. In his own house he drew his sword and stuck it into the wall in order to find out whether his hand could carry through. Then he slew the powerful man.

== Authenticity ==
The scholars of the Jesus Seminar gave the parable of the assassin a "pink" rating, indicating that it is in their opinion probably, but not certainly, an authentic saying of Jesus. They were influenced by parallels with the parables of the tower builder and of the warring king found in the Gospel of Luke (see Counting the cost), and by the "scandalous nature of the image."

According to Funk (1997), "[a]ttributing a parable to Jesus not attested in the canonical gospels, and known only for a few years, was an act of courage that demanded careful deliberation". This decision by the Seminar has been criticized for inconsistency, since the parallel parable of the warring king in Luke was not given a pink rating.

The authenticity of this parable has been attacked on the grounds that Jesus would not use a parable that glorifies murder, and because of its use of the phrase "the Kingdom of the Father" which is not found in the canonical gospels.

== Meaning ==
Like the Lucan parables of the warring king and the tower, this parable seems to concern "estimating the cost of an act or the capability to perform it successfully." In Mark, Jesus explains the idea of evil being rehearsed before taking place: "For from within, out of the heart of men, proceed evil thoughts, adulteries, fornications, murders, thefts, covetousness, wickedness, deceit, lasciviousness, an evil eye, blasphemy, pride, foolishness: All these evil things come from within, and defile the man."

According to some of the fellows of the Jesus Seminar, "the story line of the parable originally had to do with Davidic reversal, as in David and Goliath: The little guy bests the big guy by taking the precautions a prudent person would take before encountering the village bully". A similar message can be found in the parable of the strong man.
