= Parable of the Two Debtors =

Parable from the Gospel of Luke

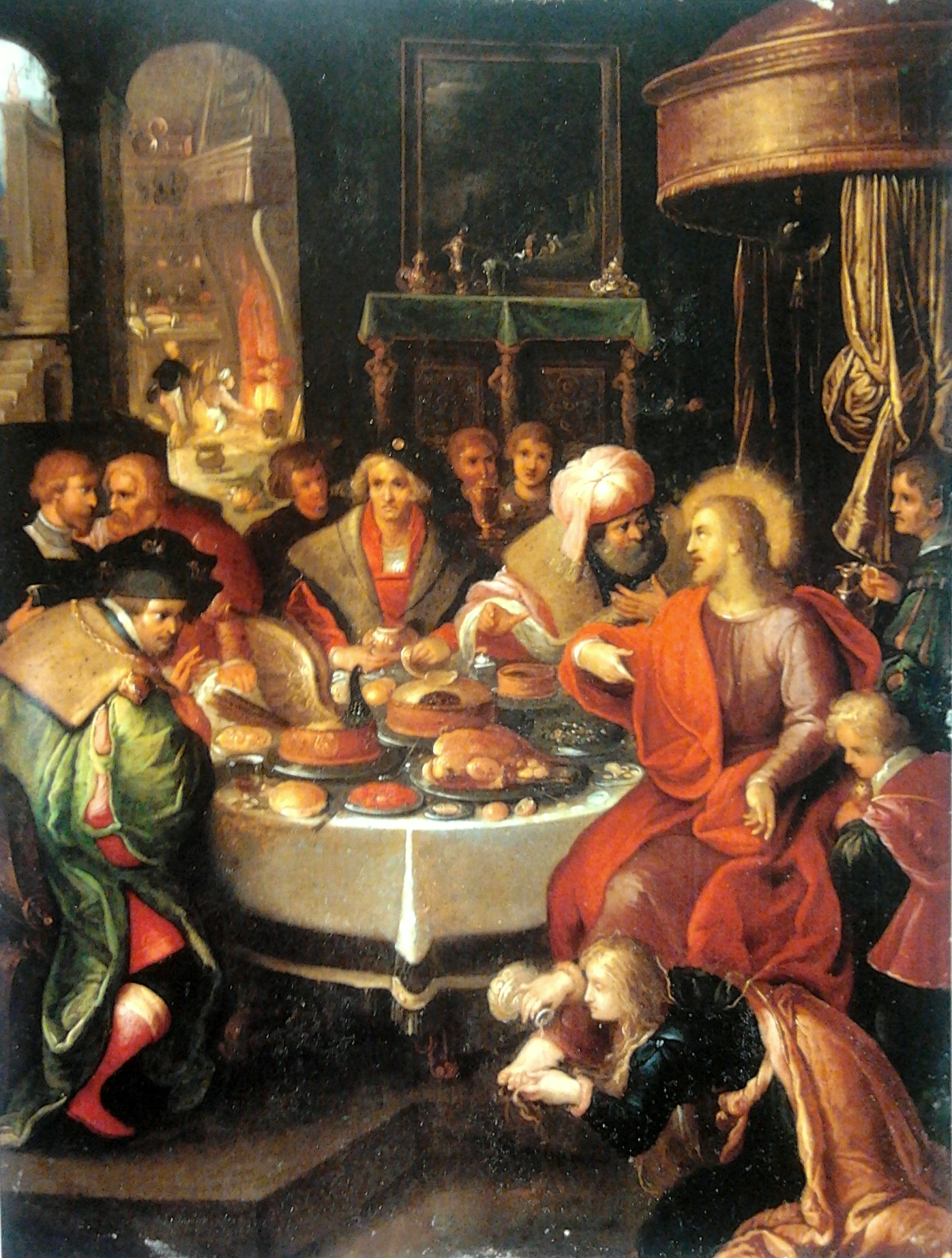
Feast in the House of Simon by Francis Francken the Younger.

The Parable of the Two Debtors is a parable of Jesus. It appears in Luke 7:36–7:50, where Jesus uses the parable to explain that the woman who has anointed him loves him more than his host, because she has been forgiven of greater sins.

A similar anointing in Matthew 26:6–13 and Mark 14:3–9 may not refer to the same event, and this parable is not to be confused with the parable of the unforgiving servant, where a king forgives his servant, and the servant in turn is unable to have mercy on someone with a lesser debt.

== Narrative ==
The parable is told in response to an unspoken reaction by Jesus' host, who is named Simon (and is sometimes identified with Simon the Leper):

One of the Pharisees invited him to eat with him. He entered into the Pharisee's house, and sat at the table. Behold, a woman in the city who was a sinner, when she knew that he was reclining in the Pharisee's house, she brought an alabaster jar of ointment. Standing behind at his feet weeping, she began to wet his feet with her tears, and she wiped them with the hair of her head, kissed his feet, and anointed them with the ointment. Now when the Pharisee who had invited him saw it, he said to himself, "This man, if he were a prophet, would have perceived who and what kind of woman this is who touches him, that she is a sinner." (Luke 7:36-39, World English Bible)

According to Luke, Jesus responds as follows:

Jesus answered him, "Simon, I have something to tell you."

He said, "Teacher, say on."

"A certain lender had two debtors. The one owed five hundred denarii, and the other fifty. When they couldn't pay, he forgave them both. Which of them therefore will love him most?"

Simon answered, "He, I suppose, to whom he forgave the most."

He said to him, "You have judged correctly." Turning to the woman, he said to Simon, "Do you see this woman? I entered into your house, and you gave me no water for my feet, but she has wet my feet with her tears, and wiped them with the hair of her head. You gave me no kiss, but she, since the time I came in, has not ceased to kiss my feet. You didn't anoint my head with oil, but she has anointed my feet with ointment. Therefore I tell you, her sins, which are many, are forgiven, for she loved much. But to whom little is forgiven, the same loves little." He said to her, "Your sins are forgiven."

— Luke 7:40-47, World English Bible

The denarius in this parable is a coin worth a labourer's daily wage. In Catholic tradition, the woman is identified with Mary Magdalene, although Eastern Orthodox and Protestant churches generally disagree. By the standards of the time, Simon the Pharisee has indeed been a poor host: at the very least he should have provided water so that Jesus could wash his dusty feet, and a kiss would have been the normal greeting.

== Interpretation ==
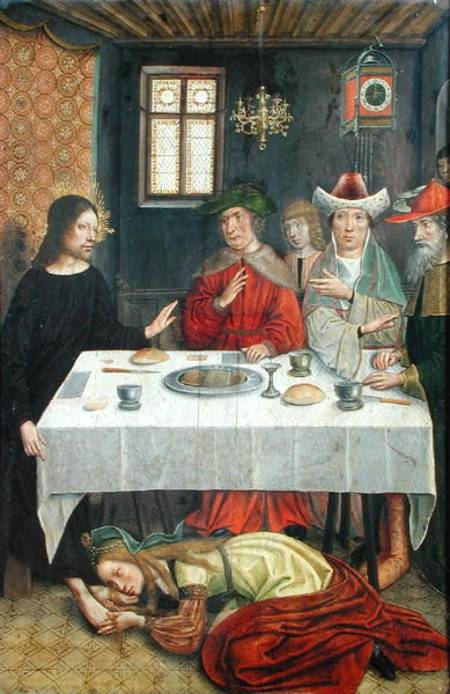
The Meal at the House of Simon the Pharisee, c. 15th century.

The parable does not seem to be an attack on Pharisees, but rather an attempt to teach Simon to see the woman as Jesus sees her. The description of the woman suggests that she is a known prostitute, although this inference is disputed. If she is a prostitute, her presence defiles the Pharisee's ritual purity. Joel B. Green notes that it "was and is easy enough to dismiss such a person as immoral as well as unclean and deviant, without grappling with the social realities faced" by the woman, who may have been forced into this life by economic circumstances, or have been sold into sexual slavery.

By affirming the woman's forgiveness, presumably given to her by Jesus on a previous encounter, Jesus invites Simon to realise her new identity and "embrace her in the community of God's people." Barbara Reid writes:

The question that the story poses is: can Simon see differently? Can he see what Jesus sees: a forgiven woman who shows great love? If he can see her this way, then he may perceive Jesus aright: not only as prophet, but also as the agent of God's forgiving love.

By responding to Simon's unspoken thought, Jesus is demonstrating the prophetic abilities which the Pharisee is doubting, while the parable invites him "to reconsider the meaning of this woman's actions — not the repayment of a debt, as though she were a slave girl or prostitute, but an expression of love that flows from the freedom of having all debts canceled." John Calvin writes regarding Jesus' words ("Therefore, I tell you, her many sins have been forgiven — for she loved much"):

By these words it is plain he does not make love the cause of forgiveness, but the proof of it. The similitude is borrowed from the case of a debtor, to whom a debt of five hundred pence had been forgiven. It is not said that the debt is forgiven because he loved much, but that he loved much because it was forgiven. The similitude ought to be applied in this way: You think this woman is a sinner; but you ought to have acknowledged her as not a sinner, in respect that her sins have been forgiven her. Her love ought to have been to you a proof of her having obtained forgiveness, that love being an expression of gratitude for the benefit received. It is an argument a posteriori, by which something is demonstrated by the results produced by it. Our Lord plainly attests the ground on which she had obtained forgiveness, when he says, "Thy faith has saved thee." [Luke 7:50] By faith, therefore, we obtain forgiveness: by love we give thanks, and bear testimony to the loving-kindness of the Lord.

Ambrose, however, makes the woman's love the condition for her forgiveness:

If, then, any one, having committed hidden sins, shall nevertheless diligently do penance, how shall he receive those rewards if not restored to the communion of the Church? I am willing, indeed, that the guilty man should hope for pardon, should seek it with tears and groans, should seek it with the aid of the tears of all the people, should implore forgiveness; and if communion be postponed two or three times, that he should believe that his entreaties have not been urgent enough, that he must increase his tears, must come again even in greater trouble, clasp the feet of the faithful with his arms, kiss them, wash them with tears, and not let them go, so that the Lord Jesus may say of him too: "His sins which are many are forgiven, for he loved much."

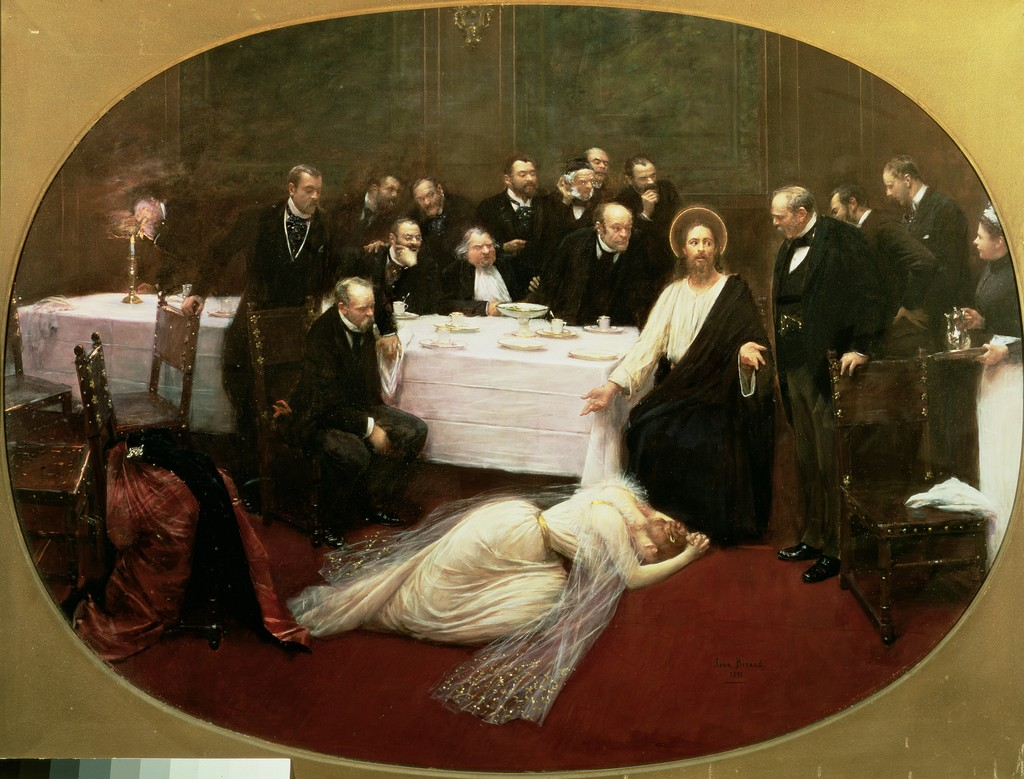
St. Mary Magdalene in the House of Simon the Pharisee, Jean Béraud, 1891.

Calvin's interpretation is perhaps better supported by the nature of the parable and by the Greek text, in which "for she loved much" can be read as the result, rather than the cause, of "her many sins have been forgiven." Many modern translations, both Protestant and Catholic, reword verse 47 for clarity, e.g.:

"So I tell you that all her sins are forgiven, and that is why she has shown great love. But anyone who has been forgiven for only a little will show only a little love." (Contemporary English Version)

"So I tell you, her many sins have been forgiven; hence, she has shown great love. But the one to whom little is forgiven, loves little." (New American Bible)

C.S. Lewis makes the following point, "To be a Christian means to forgive the inexcusable because God has forgiven the inexcusable in you."

Cornelius a Lapide comments on verse 42 of the parable, writing, "The meaning is, As he who has been forgiven much, is accounted to have received forgiveness because of his deserts, so debtors who owe much, are wont to show the utmost deference to their creditors, in order to obtain from them, if not forgiveness of their debt, at least favourable terms of payment. In like manner, Simon, thou shouldest have known that the Magdalene loved me with a greater love than thine. For she showed greater proofs of her love, and therefore her sins, which are many, are forgiven, because she loved much. Wherefore, she is no longer a sinner, nor, as thou thinkest, unworthy to touch my feet; but holier than thou, and more worthy to be touched by me. The parable, therefore, plainly teaches us, that the more we love, the more we shall be forgiven."

== Art and popular culture ==
While the parable itself is seldom depicted in art, there are numerous depictions of the anointing, by Sandro Botticelli, Antonio Campi, Dirk Bouts, Onofrio Avellino, Cigoli, Nicolas Poussin, Bernardo Strozzi, and Peter Paul Rubens, among others. In some paintings, yellow clothing denotes the woman's former occupation as a prostitute. In Armenian religious art, this episode of anointing is depicted as distinct from those in other gospels. The 1891 painting by Jean Béraud brought the episode into the 19th century, with the repentant prostitute represented by the well-known courtesan Liane de Pougy, who eventually became a Dominican tertiary.

The parable is included in medieval and later mystery plays about Mary Magdalene, such as Lewis Wager's play of 1550–1566.

== See also ==
- Life of Jesus in the New Testament
- Ministry of Jesus
