= Counting the cost =

Parable taught by Jesus of Nazareth according to the Christian Gospel of Luke

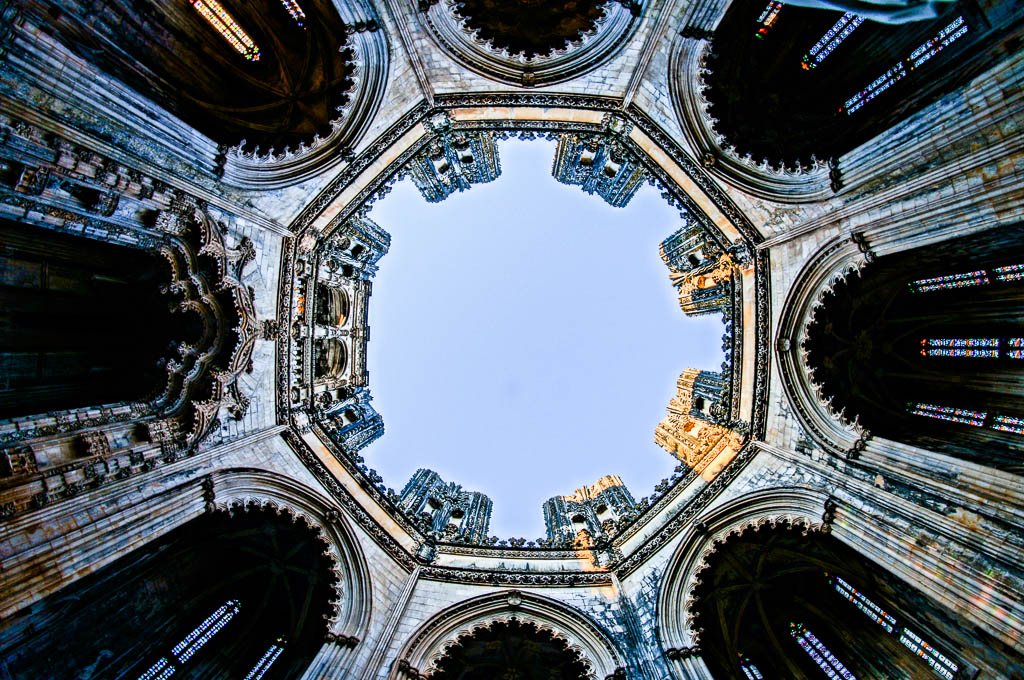
The unfinished chapels of Batalha Monastery; construction was abandoned in 1533 and the vaulted ceiling was never concluded.

Counting the Cost (Note: In the NIV, the parable is named The Cost of Being a Disciple; in the NRSV, it is called The Cost of Discipleship, and in the NKJV it is known as Leaving All to Follow Christ.) is a passage in the Gospel of Luke (Luke 14:25–33) which includes a pair of parables told by Jesus. The first title comes from the phrase "count the cost", which occurs in the King James Version of the passage, as well as some other versions.

== Narrative ==
The two parables are as follows:

Large crowds were traveling with Jesus, and turning to them he said: "If anyone comes to me and does not hate father and mother, wife and children, brothers and sisters—yes, even their own life—such a person cannot be my disciple. And whoever does not carry their cross and follow me cannot be my disciple.

"Suppose one of you wants to build a tower. Won't you first sit down and estimate the cost to see if you have enough money to complete it? For if you lay the foundation and are not able to finish it, everyone who sees it will ridicule you, saying, 'This person began to build and wasn't able to finish.'

"Or suppose a king is about to go to war against another king. Won't he first sit down and consider whether he is able with ten thousand men to oppose the one coming against him with twenty thousand? If he is not able, he will send a delegation while the other is still a long way off and will ask for terms of peace. In the same way, those of you who do not give up everything you have cannot be my disciples."

== Interpretation ==
Joel B. Green suggests that it is unclear what kind of tower is being referred to in the first parable, but notes that the message is that a "thoroughgoing fidelity to God's salvific aim" is required, "manifest in one's identity as a disciple of Jesus". This involves putting family and possessions second, as in Matthew 8:18–22 and Luke 9:57–62.

This verse is of great importance to Anabaptist groups such as the Hutterites and Bruderhof who interpret it as a call to live without private property or possessions. To them, "to forsake all that he has" is an instruction to give up everything in the service of Jesus.

Eric Franklin argues that the requirement to "hate" in Luke (verse 26) is "Semitic exaggeration", and Joseph Benson envisages that hatred "signifies only an inferior degree of love".

Cornelius a Lapide, in his great commentary, comments on verse 33, writing that, "this is the post-parable, and sums up the teaching of the parable itself. 'He who refuseth to give up all, in order that he may live a life of evangelical perfection, cannot be My disciple as the Apostles were.' And again, It would be better for him who is unwilling to give up all, when persecution or necessity demand it and will not submit to the loss of possessions, family, and even life itself for the gospel's sake, not to take My yoke upon him, rather than having begun to lead a Christian life, to fall away and apostatise from the faith. For such a one adds the sin of apostasy to that of unbelief, according to the Scripture: 'For it had been better for them not to have known the way of righteousness, than, after they have known it, to turn from the holy commandment delivered unto them.' 2 Peter 2:21."

== See also ==
- Life of Jesus in the New Testament
- Luke 14
- Ministry of Jesus
