= Sycamine =

Tree mentioned in ancient literature

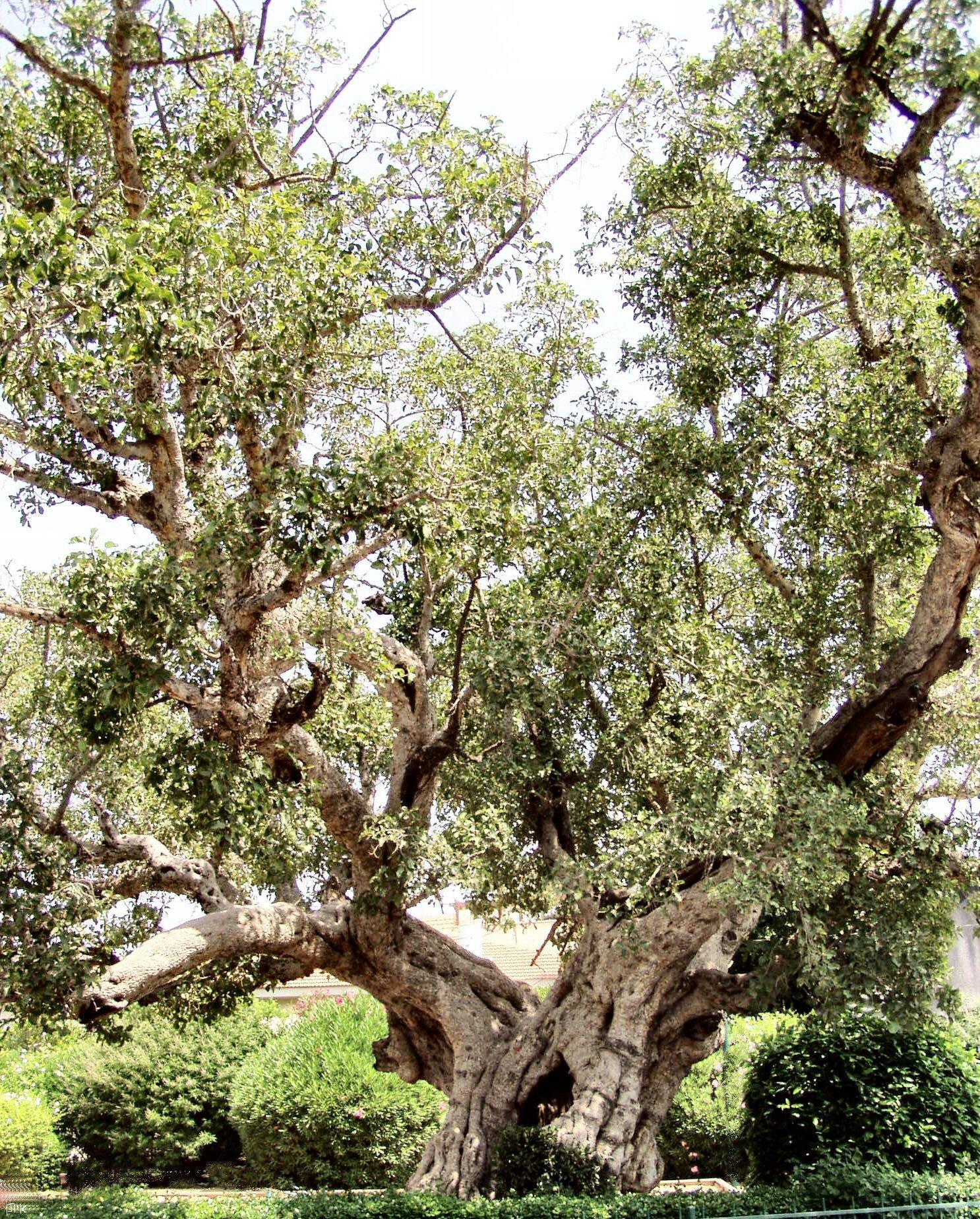
Sycamine tree in the Land of Israel

The sycamine tree (Greek: συκάμινος sykaminοs) is a tree mentioned in both classical Hebrew literature (Isaiah 9:10; Mishnah Demai 1:1, et al.) and in Greek literature. (Note: In the dative case form of the word, i.e. συκαμίνῳ sykaminōi) The tree is also known by the names sycamore fig tree (Ficus sycomorus), and fig-mulberry. It appears also in Luke 17:6 and 19:4 of the Bible. The Hebrew word for the tree is shiḳmah (sing.) (Hebrew: שקמה), shiḳmīn (pl.) (Hebrew: שקמין), having nearly the same phonemes in Greek (συκομορέα sykomorea). Other translations, however, identify the tree as mulberry tree, found in two species, the Black Mulberry (Morus nigra) and the White Mulberry (Morus alba), which are common in Palestine. It is in the same family as the fig-tree.

The bricks are fallen, but we will build with hewn stones; the sycamores are cut down, but cedars will we put in their place.

The trees were once very common along the lowlands and coastal plains of Israel. During the Second Temple period, sycamore fig trees grew in Jericho, but when passers-by would come along and appropriate the tree branches unto themselves, the owners came and dedicated the trees, in their entirety, to the Temple treasury as a dedicatory offering in order to prevent their theft.

The sycamine is a deciduous to semi-deciduous tree and sheds its fruit in a prolific manner, by reason of which the Sages of Israel prohibited a Jewish planter from planting such trees within the radius of 50 cubits from his neighbor's cistern.

All sycamines that currently grow in the Land of Israel (Ficus sycomorus) are believed to be invasive species, but which are now cultivated in Israel. The tree is native to East Africa. It is thought that the species was once endemic to the Land of Israel. Another species of sycamine endemic to the Horn of Africa, Ethiopia and Yemen is Ficus vasta.
