= Pharisee and the Publican =

Parable taught by Jesus of Nazareth according to the Christian Gospel of Luke

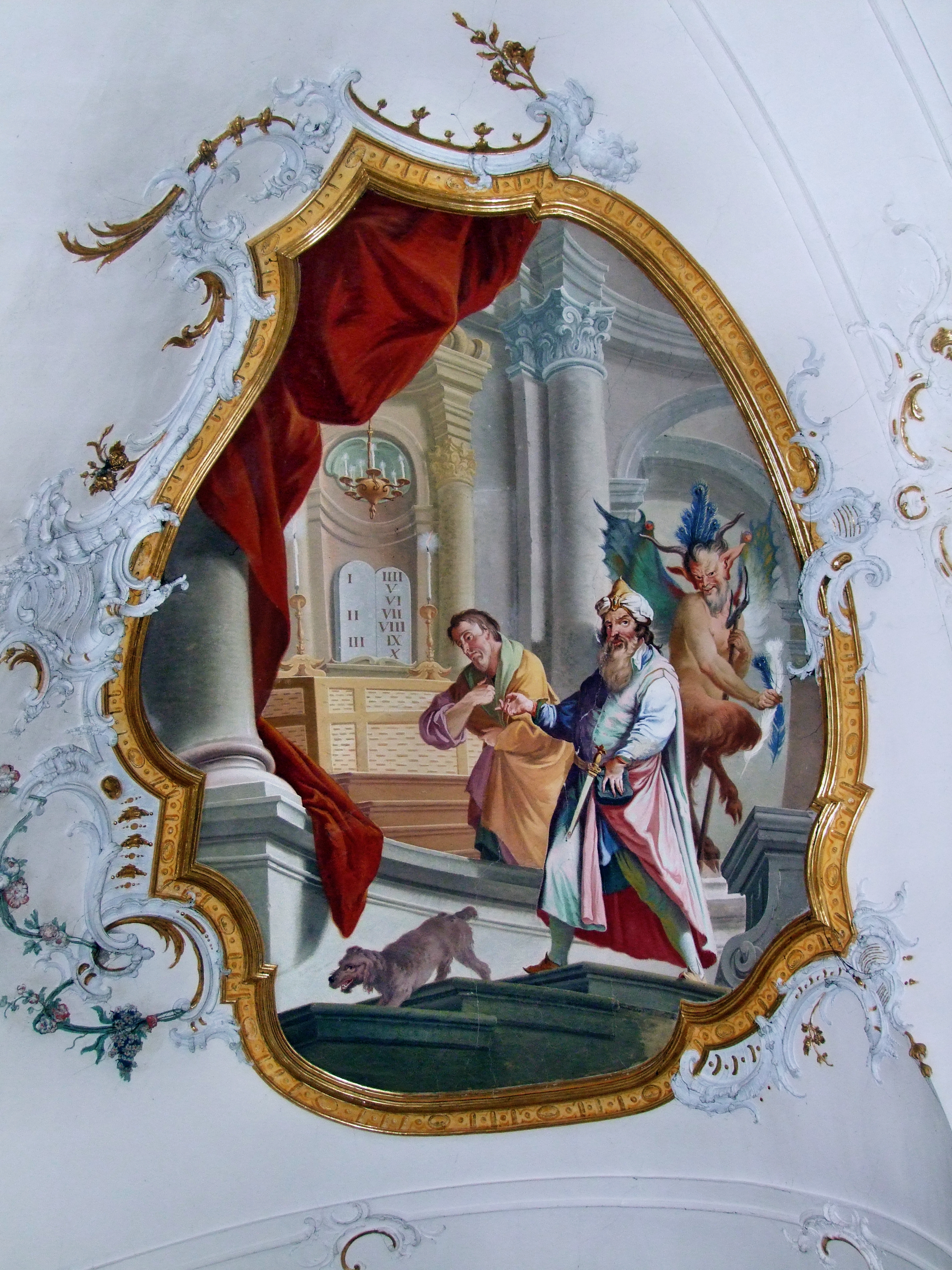
The Pharisee & the Publican, baroque fresco in Ottobeuren Basilica.

The parable of the Pharisee and the Publican (or the Pharisee and the Tax Collector) is a parable of Jesus that appears in the Gospel of Luke. In Luke 18:9–14, a self-righteous Pharisee, obsessed by his own virtue, is contrasted with a tax collector who humbly asks God for mercy.

This parable primarily shows Jesus teaching that justification can be given by the mercy of God irrespective of the receiver's prior life and that conversely self-righteousness can prohibit being justified. Further coming as it does in a section of teaching on prayer it demonstrates the need to pray humbly. It immediately follows the Parable of the Unjust Judge, which is also about prayer.

In the Eastern Orthodox Church, the Sunday of the Publican and the Pharisee commemorates the parable and begins the three-week pre-Lenten Season.

== Narrative ==
To some who thought they were self righteous and regarded others with contempt, Jesus told this parable: "Two men went to the temple to pray: one a Pharisee and the other a Tax Collector. The Pharisee, standing by himself was praying thusly: 'God, I thank you that I am not like other men: thieves, rogues, adulterers — or this tax collector. I fast twice a week and I give you a tenth of all my income.' But the tax collector, standing far off, would not even look up to heaven as he prayed; rather he beat his breast in sorrow saying, 'God, be merciful to me; a sinner.' I tell you, this man went down to his home justified rather than the other, for all who exalts himself will be humbled, and for all who humbles himself will be exalted."

== Context and interpretation ==
The New Testament often depicts Pharisees as displaying a punctilious adherence to Jewish law. The Pharisee depicted in this parable went beyond his fellows, fasting more often than was required, and giving a tithe on all he received, even in cases where the religious rules did not require it. Confident in his religiosity, the Pharisee asks God for nothing, and thus receives nothing.

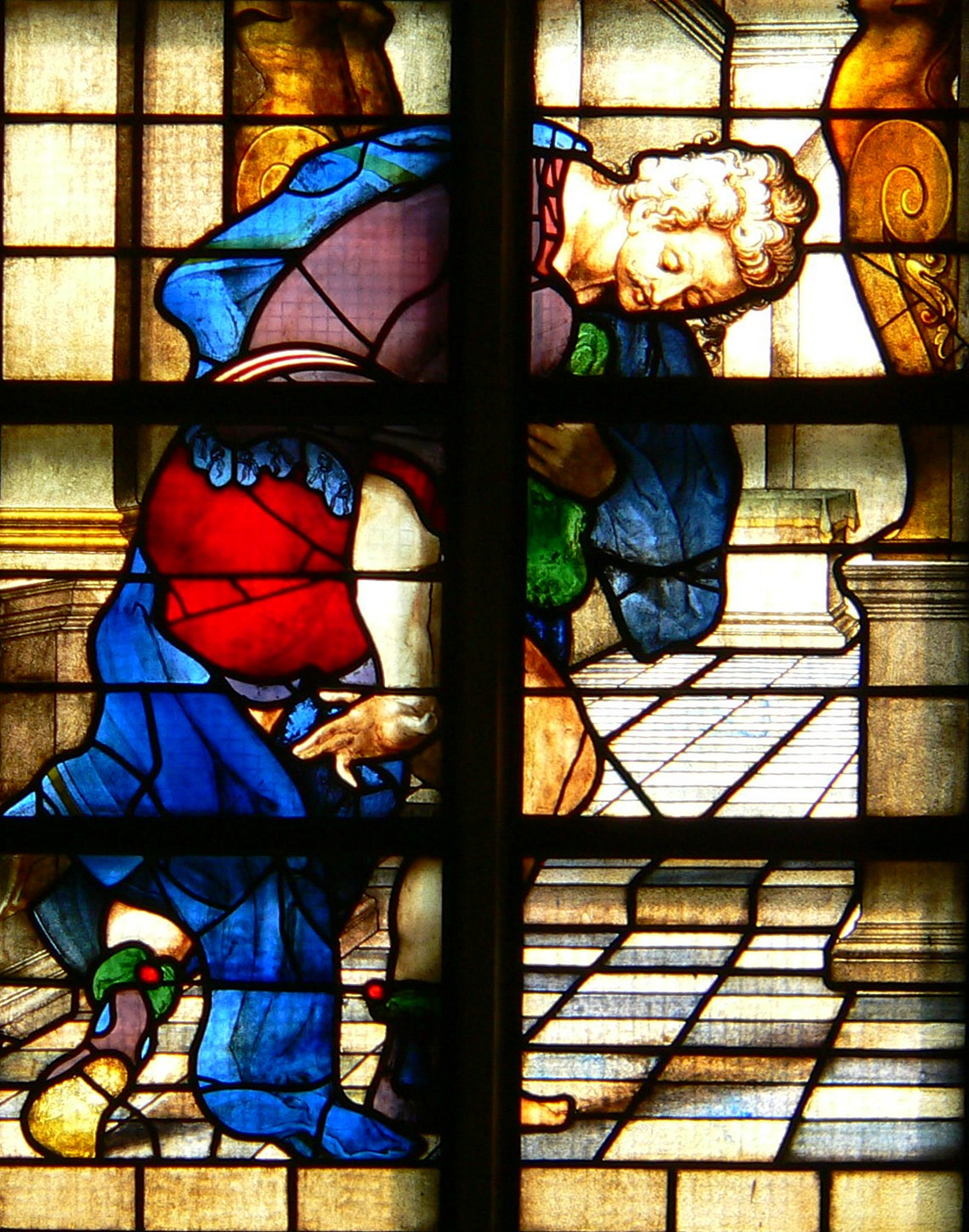
Detail of stained glass window of the parable, Janskerk (Gouda).

On the other hand, publicans were despised Jews who collaborated with the Roman Empire. Because they were best known for collecting tolls or taxes, they are commonly described as tax collectors. The parable, however, does not condemn the publican's occupation (cf Luke 3:12–13), but describes the publican as one who "recognizes his state of unworthiness before God and confesses his need for reconciliation". Coming to God in humility, the publican receives the mercy and reconciliation he asks for.

== Commemoration ==
In the Eastern Orthodox Church, the parable is read as part of the preparatory period leading up to Great Lent. It provides an example of the humility which should be practised during the Lenten period. The Sunday of the Publican and the Pharisee begins the three-week pre-Lenten Season and the first use of the liturgical Triodion (although the week following this Sunday is fast-free). This Sunday includes a hymn inspired by the parable:

Let us flee from the pride of the Pharisee!
And learn humility from the Publican's tears!
Let us cry to our Savior,
Have mercy on us,
Only merciful One!

The English writer and preacher John Bunyan wrote a book on the parable in 1685.

== Commentary ==
Friedrich Justus Knecht comments on the element of pride in this parable writing:

The Pharisee sinned by pride: 1. He thought too highly of himself. 2. He did not give due glory to God. 3. He despised his fellow-men. His prayer, therefore, was no prayer; it was nothing but a discourse in praise of himself. With the utmost pride and self-righteousness he related to God all the good works he had performed (of which, however, he was only able to enumerate two), and implied that Almighty God must be very glad to have such a valuable servant as himself!

Roger Baxter makes similar comments in his mediation writing:

"Ponder the pride of the Pharisee. Because he conceived himself perfect, he prays for no favor from God, neither for the forgiveness of his sins, nor an increase of grace. Under the pretence of giving thanks to God, he commends himself for his own good works, and arrogantly prefers himself to others. Not content with this he contemns the publican, whom he rashly judges a sinner. Thus all proud men are blind and say to themselves, " I am rich and made wealthy;" but alas! "thou knowest" not, proud soul, "that thou art wretched and miserable, and poor, and blind, and naked." (Rev. 3:19)

== Depiction in art ==
The parable has been depicted in a variety of religious art, being especially significant in Eastern Orthodox iconography. There are works on the parable by artists such as James Tissot, John Everett Millais, Hans Holbein the Younger, and Gustave Doré.

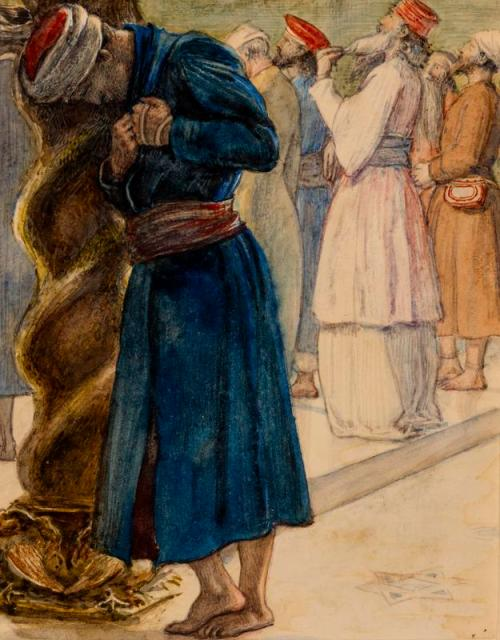
The Pharisee and the Publican, watercolour on paper, by John Everett Millais (c. 1860), Aberdeen Art Gallery

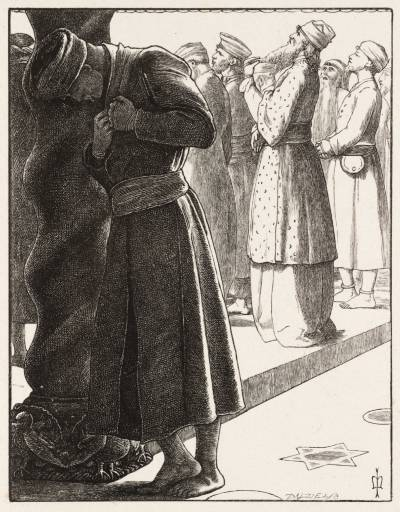
The Pharisee and the Publican, wood engraving on paper, by John Everett Millais, from "Illustrations to 'The Parables of Our Lord'", published 1864

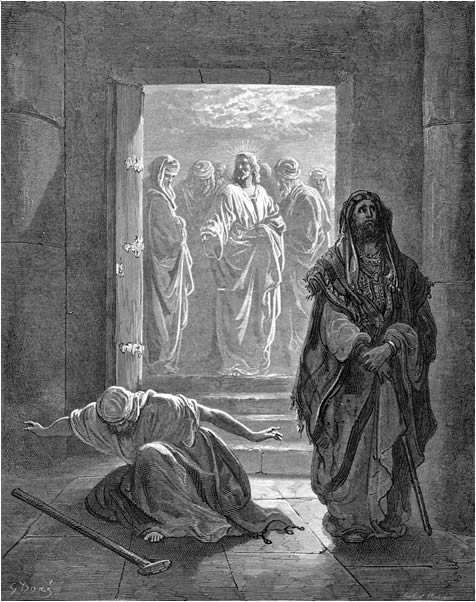
The Pharisee and the Publican by Gustave Dore (1870)

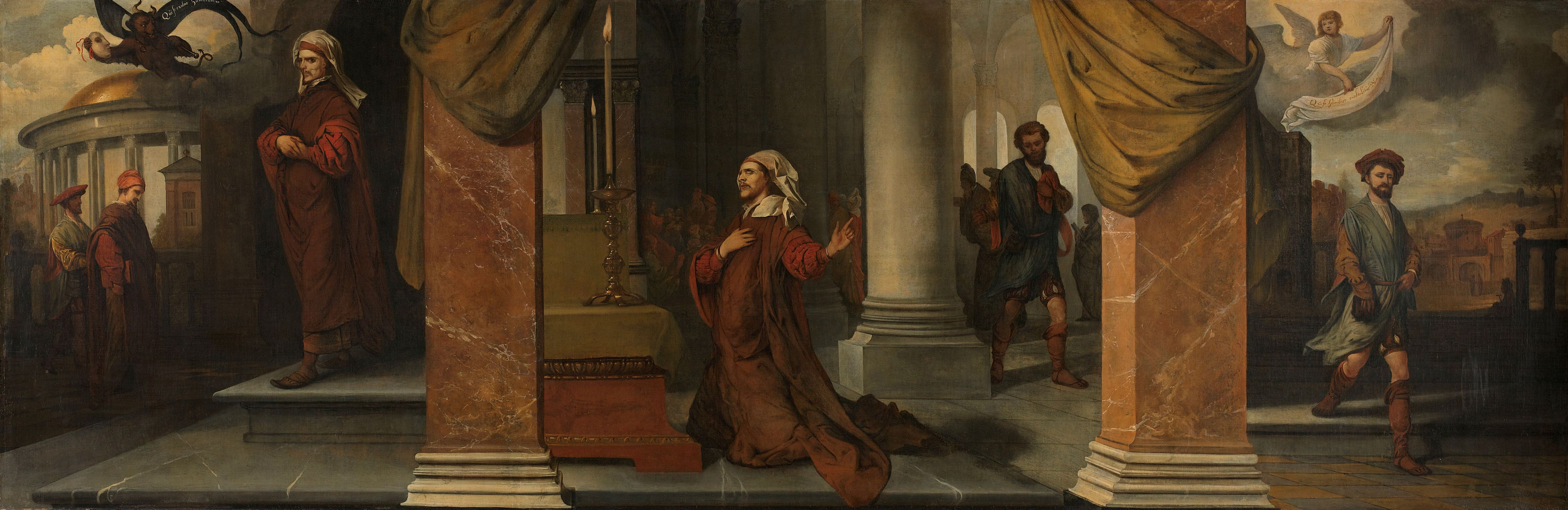
The parable of the Pharisee and the tax collector, presented in three scenes. Middle: the Pharisee kneels before the altar; Left: the proud Pharisee leaves with a devil; Right: the tax collector leaves with an angel. (1661)

== Depiction in literature ==
The parable is retold in the popular 1853 novel The Heir of Redclyffe by Charlotte Mary Yonge.

== See also ==
- Jesus Prayer
- Herr Jesu Christ, du höchstes Gut, BWV 113
- Life of Jesus in the New Testament
- Luke 18
- Ministry of Jesus
- Jesus eats with sinners and tax-collectors
- Moral superiority
