= Luke 18 =

- ← chapter 17 chapter 19 →
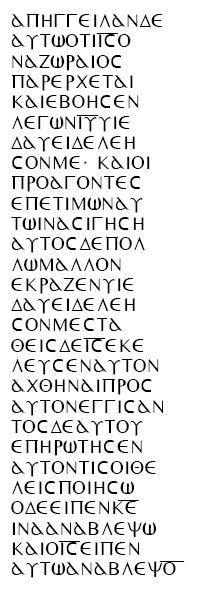
- Gospel of Luke 18:37–42a on Codex Borgianus (facsimile), written in 5th century
- Book: Gospel of Luke
- Category: Gospel
- Christian Bible part: New Testament
- Order in the Christian part: 3

Luke 18 is the eighteenth chapter of the Gospel of Luke in the New Testament of the Christian Bible. It records the teachings and a miracle of Jesus Christ. Early Christian tradition uniformly affirmed that Luke the Evangelist composed this Gospel as well as the Acts of the Apostles. Critical opinion on the attribution was evenly divided at the end of the 20th century.

== Text ==
The original text was written in Koine Greek. Some early manuscripts containing the text of this chapter are:

- Papyrus 75 (AD 175–225)
- Codex Vaticanus (325–350)
- Codex Sinaiticus (330–360)
- Codex Bezae (~400)
- Codex Washingtonianus (~400)
- Codex Alexandrinus (400–440).

This chapter is divided into 43 verses.

== Parable of the persistent widow (verses 1–8) ==
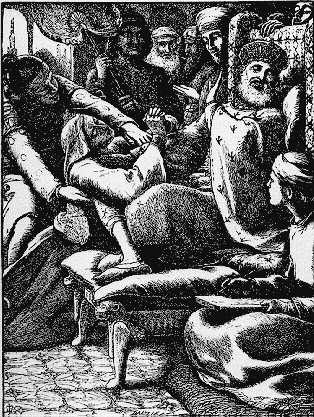
Parable of the Unjust Judge by John Everett Millais (1863)

This parable appears only in the Gospel of Luke, and is also known as the Parable of the Unjust Judge and the Parable of the Importunate Widow. Luke's introductory wording (verse 1) states that the parable is intended to show Jesus' disciples "that they should always pray and not give up" or "not lose heart". The King James Version enjoins the disciples "not to faint". It tells of a judge who "did not fear God and did not respect man", who is repeatedly approached by a poor widow who is seeking justice. Initially rejecting her demands, he eventually honors her request to avoid being worn out by her persistence. This parable is found immediately prior to the parable of the Pharisee and the Publican (also on prayer) and is similar to the parable of the Friend at Night, recorded in Luke 11.

Methodist commentator Joseph Benson notes that the separation of chapter 18 from chapter 17 "improperly interrupts" Jesus' discourse regarding the "coming of the kingdom", arguing that the forthcoming persecution "would render the duties of prayer, patience, and perseverance peculiarly seasonable". Anglican churchman Henry Alford argues that while it is "not perhaps spoken in immediate unbroken sequence after the last discourse", it probably "arose out of it: perhaps [it] was the fruit of a conversation with the disciples about the day of His coming and the mind with which they must expect it". In Alford's reading of the parable, "in its direct application it is ecclesiastical, and not individual, but by a legitimate accommodation: the widow is the Church, [and] the judge [is] her God and Father in heaven.

In modern translations, the widow's request is for "justice". Traditionally her plea for εκδικησον με (endikeson me) has been translated as "avenge me". The Revised Standard Version sees her requesting "vindication". Benson states that "the word properly signifies 'to judge a cause', and defend the injured judicially from the injurious person. The English word avenge, therefore, does not exactly hit the sense here intended, although, as Dr. Campbell observes, in the application of the parable, Luke 18:7: And shall not God avenge his own elect?, "it answers better than any other term".

Alford adds that the persistence intended by the story refers to the believer's "earnest desire of the heart ..., rather than, though of course including, the outward act" of prayer.

== Parable of the Pharisee and the publican (verses 9–14) ==
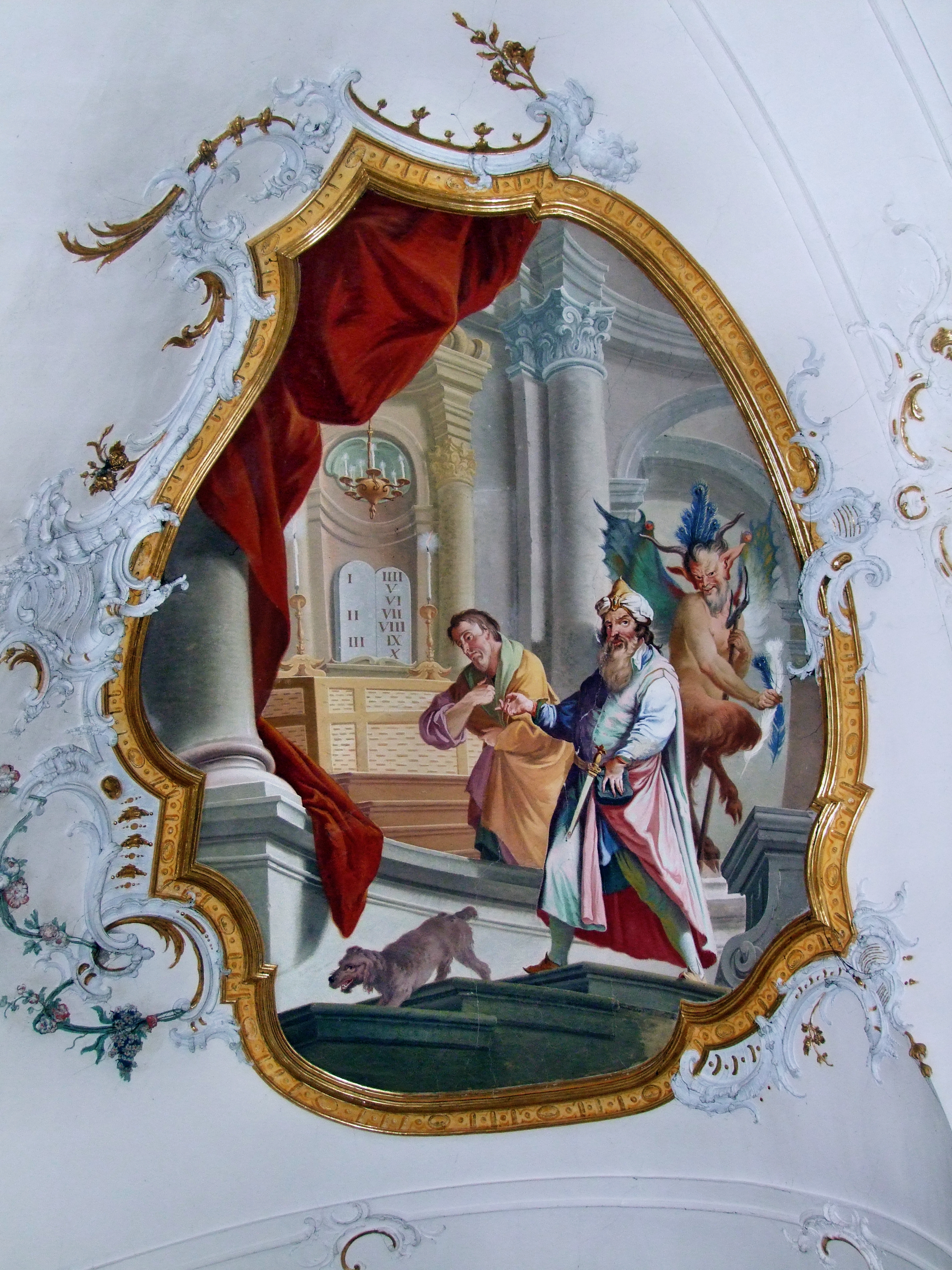
The Pharisee and the Publican, baroque fresco in Ottobeuren Basilica

[Jesus] also told this parable to some who trusted in themselves that they were righteous, and treated others with contempt:

In the New Testament, the Pharisees often display a punctilious adherence to Jewish Law. Verna Holyhead notes that Luke's "audience" for this parable included not only the Pharisees but others "who trusted in themselves". United Methodist theologian Joel B. Green explains that the Pharisee depicted in this parable went beyond his fellows, fasting more often than was required, and giving a tithe on all he receives, even in cases where the religious rules did not require it. Confident in his religiosity, the Pharisee asks God for nothing, and thus receives nothing. He gives thanks not because he is good but because (in his own opinion) he is the only one who is good.

On the other hand, publicans were despised Jews who collaborated with the Roman Empire. Because they were best known for collecting tolls or taxes (see tax farming), they are commonly described as tax collectors. The parable, however, does not condemn the publican's occupation (cf Luke 3:12–13), but describes the publican as one who "recognizes his state of unworthiness before God and confesses his need for reconciliation". Coming to God in humility, the publican receives the mercy and reconciliation he asks for.

== Jesus blesses the little children (verses 15–17) ==
These verses contain a saying of Jesus regarding children and the Kingdom of God. From these verses onwards, Luke rejoins the other two synoptic gospels, from which his narrative has diverged since Luke 9:51.

== Jesus and the rich young ruler (verses 18–34) ==
=== Verse 18 ===
Now a certain ruler asked Him, saying, “Good Teacher, what shall I do to inherit eternal life?”

This is the same question as had been asked by a lawyer in Luke 10:25, to which Jesus responded with his confirmation of the Great Commandment and the parable of the Good Samaritan.

== Jesus heals a blind man near Jericho (verses 35–43) ==
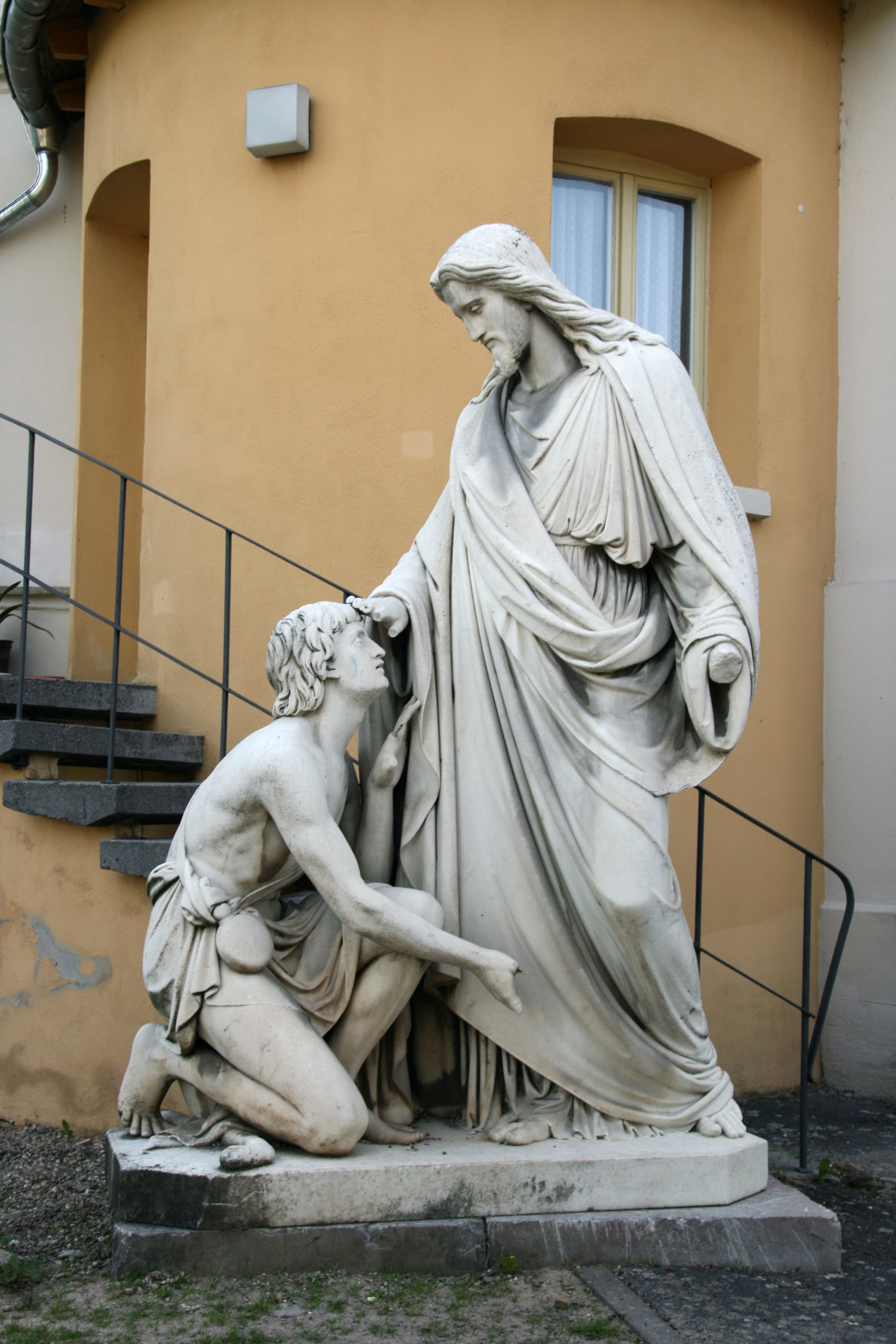
Jesus healing blind Bartimaeus, by Johann Heinrich Stöver, 1861

Each of the three synoptic gospels tells of Jesus healing the blind near Jericho, as he passed through that town, shortly before his passion. Mark 10:46–52 tells only of a man named Bartimaeus (literally "Son of Timaeus") being present, as Jesus left Jericho, making him one of the few named people to be miraculously cured by Jesus. Matthew 20:29–34 has a similar account of two blind men being healed outside of Jericho, but gives no names. Luke 18:35–43 tells of one unnamed blind man, but ties the event to Jesus' approach to Jericho rather than his departure from there.

These men together would be the second of two healings of blind men on Jesus' journey from the start of his travels from Bethsaida (in Mark 8:22–26) to Jerusalem, via Jericho. It is possible, though not certain, that Bartimaeus heard about the first healing, and so knew of Jesus' reputation.

== See also ==
- Jericho
- Ministry of Jesus
- Miracles of Jesus
- Parables of Jesus
- Related Bible parts: Matthew 19, Matthew 20, Mark 10

Preceded by Luke 17	Chapters of the Bible; Gospel of Luke	Succeeded by Luke 19
