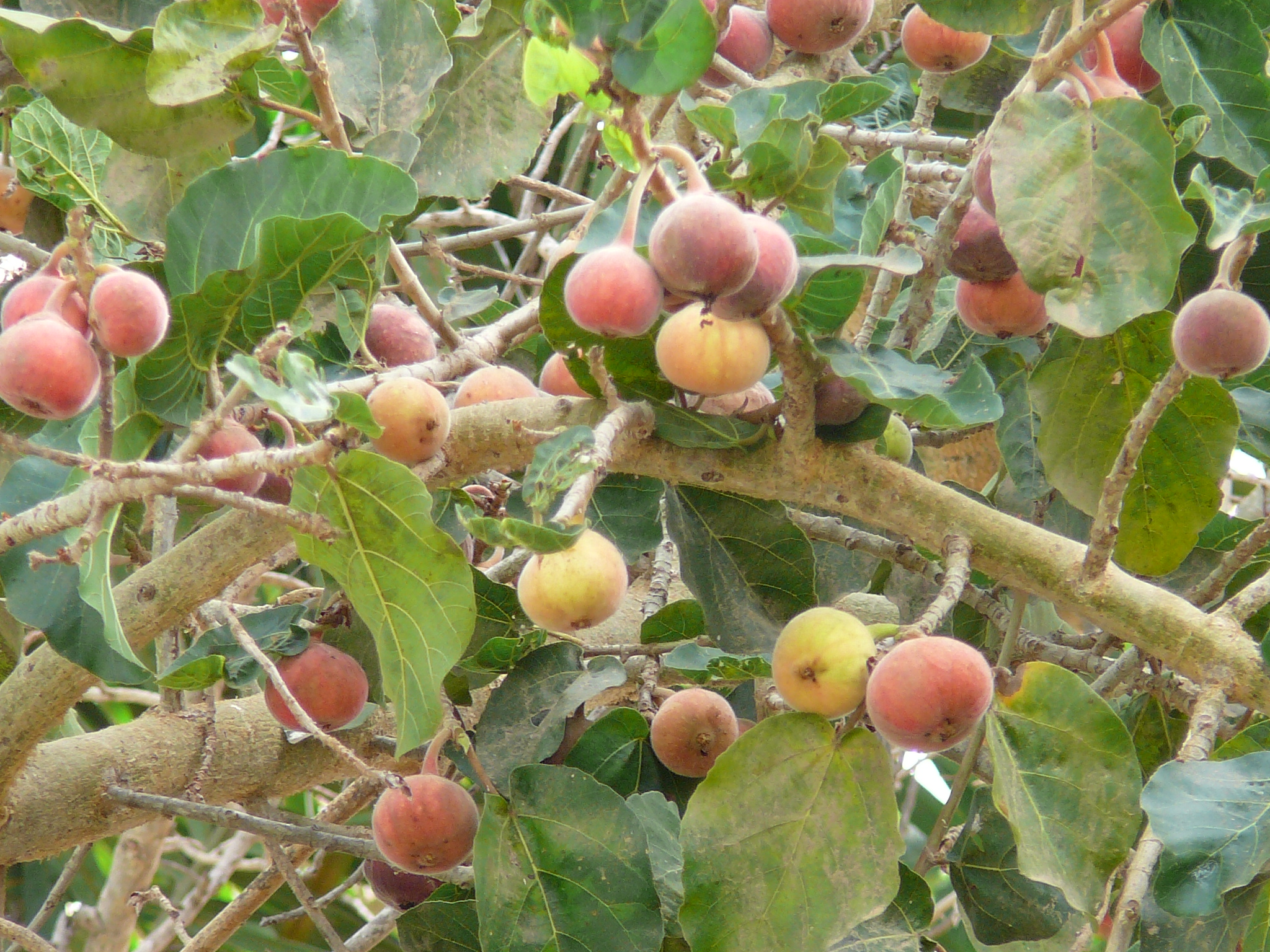
- Leaves and syconia of Ficus sycomorus

Conservation status
- Least Concern (IUCN 3.1)

Scientific classification
- Kingdom: Plantae
- Clade: Tracheophytes
- Clade: Angiosperms
- Clade: Eudicots
- Clade: Rosids
- Order: Rosales
- Family: Moraceae
- Genus: Ficus
- Subgenus: F. subg. Sycomorus
- Species: F. sycomorus

Binomial name
- Ficus sycomorus L.
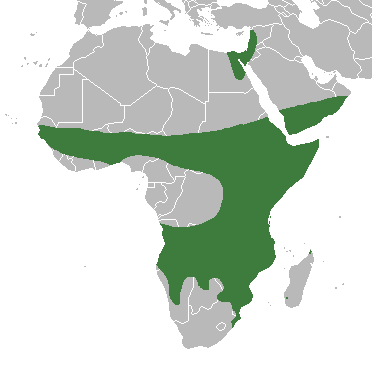

Synonyms
- Ficus chanas Forssk.; Ficus cocculifolia Baker; Ficus cocculifolia subsp. sakalavarum (Baker) H.Perrier & Leandri; Ficus cocculifolia var. sakalavarum (Baker) H.Perrier; Ficus comorensis Warb.; Ficus damarensis Engl.; Ficus gnaphalocarpa (Miq.) Steud. ex Miq.; Ficus integrifolia Sim, nom. illeg. homonym. post.; Ficus sakalavarum Baker; Ficus scabra Sim, nom. illeg. homonym. post.; Ficus sycomorus subsp. gnaphalocarpa (Miq.) C.C.Berg; Ficus trachyphylla (Fenzl ex Miq.) Miq.; Sycomorus antiquorum Gasp.; Sycomorus gnaphalocarpa Miq.; Sycomorus rigida Miq.; Sycomorus trachyphyllus Fenzl ex Miq.

= Ficus sycomorus =

Species of fig

Ficus sycomorus, called the sycamore fig or the fig-mulberry (because the leaves resemble those of the mulberry), sycamore, or sycomore, is a fig species that has been cultivated since ancient times.

== Description ==
Ficus sycomorus grows to 20 metres (66 ft) tall and has a considerable spread, with a dense round crown of spreading branches. The bark is green-yellow to orange and exfoliates in papery strips to reveal the yellow inner bark. Like all other figs, it contains a latex. The leaves are heart-shaped with a round apex, 14 centimetres (5 1/2 in) long by 10 cm wide, and arranged spirally around the twig. They are dark green above and lighter with prominent yellow veins below, and both surfaces are rough to the touch. The petiole is 0.5–3 cm (1/4–1 1/8 in) long and pubescent.

Flowering and fruiting occurs year-round, starting in April or later depending on variety, peaking from July to December. The fruit is a large edible fig, 2–3 cm in diameter, ripening from buff-green to yellow or red. It is borne in thick clusters on long branchlets or the leaf axil. It is sometimes separated into five successive "crops".

=== Etymology ===
The specific name came into English in the 14th century as sicamour, derived from Old French sagremore, sicamor. This in turn derives from Latin sycomorus, from Ancient Greek σῡκόμορος (sykómoros) 'fig-mulberry'. The Greek name may be from the Greek tree-names sykón 'fig' and moron 'mulberry', or it may derive from the Hebrew name for the mulberry, shiqmah.

The name sycamore spelled with an A has also been used for unrelated trees: the great maple, Acer pseudoplatanus, or plane trees, Platanus. The spelling "sycomore", with an O rather than an A as the second vowel is, if used, specific to F. sycomorus.

== Distribution and habitat ==
Ficus sycomorus is native to Africa south of the Sahel and north of the Tropic of Capricorn, excluding the central-west rainforest areas. It grows naturally in Lebanon; in the southern Arabian Peninsula; in Cyprus; in very localised areas in Madagascar; and in Palestine and Egypt.

It also grows in Israel. In its native habitat, the tree is usually found in rich soils along rivers and in mixed woodlands. However, it is also a beloved tree in the Israeli urban environment, such as Tel Aviv. Some specimens are huge: one tree which has been in the public eye has a diameter of over two meters. Ficus sycomorus is a protected tree in Tel Aviv, and indeed in all of Israel, a measure which sometimes conflicts with goals of urban maintenance and development (roots can crack walls, sidewalks, pipes, etc.) They also scatter fig debris on sidewalks. However, in addition to beauty, they also provide a shaded canopy against the strong Mediterranean sun.

F. sycomorus is currently threatened by environmental destruction, but in spite of this, has demonstrated resilience. Considering the tree's healing qualities and traditional significance, scientific study and conservation efforts are imperative.

== Cultivation ==
Two major varieties are known in Egypt: Roumi (also called Falaki or Turki), which has more horizontally spread branches, stouter shoots and petioles, more densely spaced leaves that are wider than they are long, and larger, flatter, broad pink fruits; and Kelabi (also called Arabi or Beledi), which has more vertical branches, is more slender, has smaller leaves and has smaller yellowish pear shaped fruits. In modern history, many Egyptians would once a year (on the day of a particular saint) make a ring of bruises and cuts around the base of their sycamore trees.

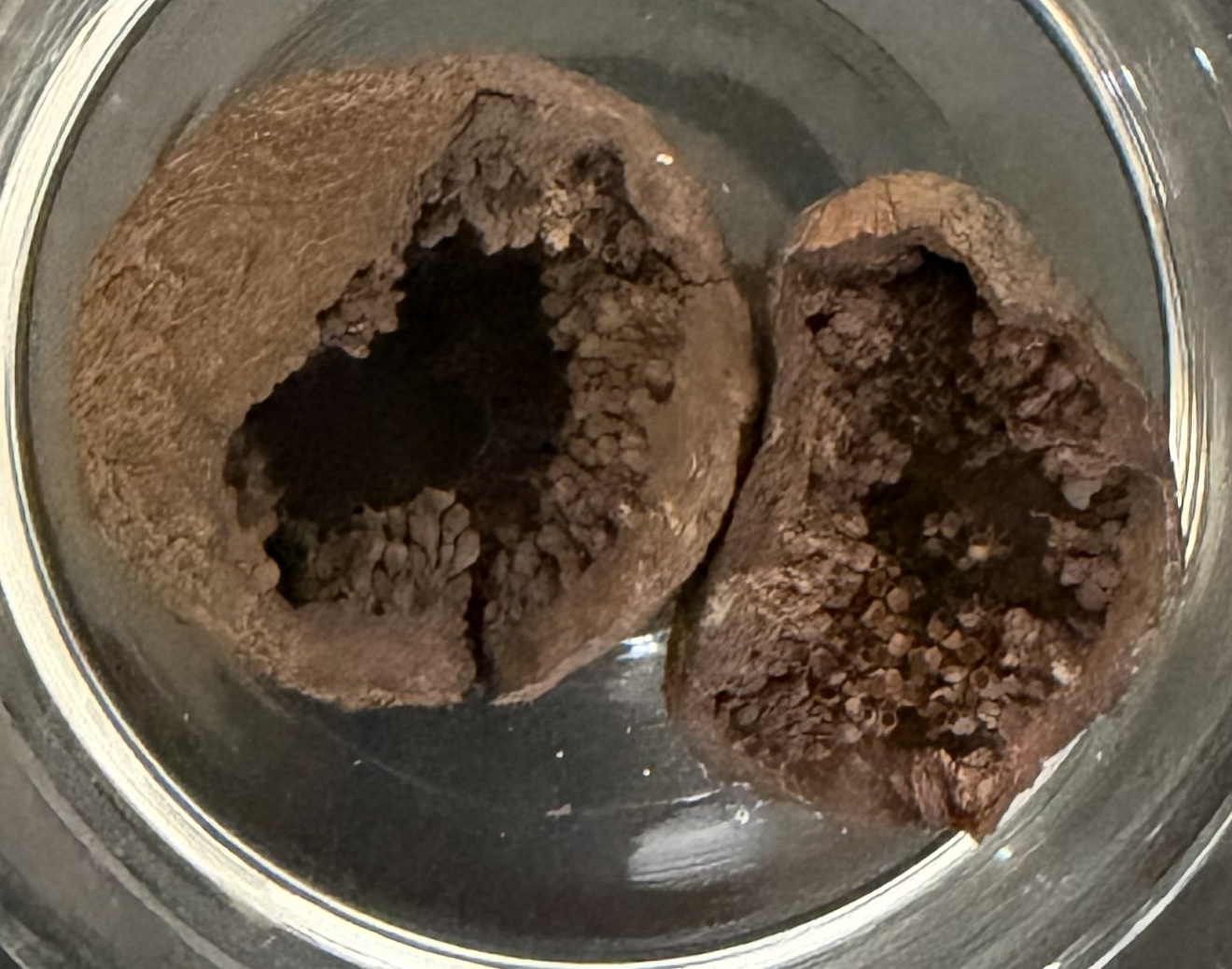
Some ancient Ficus sycomorus figs. Egyptian tomb offering, 2000–1500 BCE. At the Louvre.

According to botanists Daniel Zohary and Maria Hopf, cultivation of this species was "almost exclusively" by the ancient Egyptians. Remains of F. sycomorus begin to appear in predynastic times and occur in quantity from the start of the third millennium BC. It was the ancient Egyptian tree of life. Zohary and Hopf note that "the fruit and the timber, and sometimes even the twigs, are richly represented in the tombs of the Egyptian Early, Middle and Late Kingdoms." In numerous cases the parched fruiting bodies, known as sycons, "bear characteristic gashing marks indicating that this art, which induces ripening, was practised in Egypt in ancient times." These representations come in the form of hieroglyphics.

Although this species of fig requires the presence of the symbiotic wasp Ceratosolen arabicus to reproduce sexually, and this insect is extinct in Egypt, Zohay and Hopf have no doubt that Egypt was "the principal area of sycamore fig development." Some of the caskets of mummies in Egypt are made from the wood of this tree. In tropical areas where the wasp is common, complex mini-ecosystems involving the wasp, nematodes, other parasitic wasps, and various larger predators revolve around the life cycle of the fig. The trees' random production of fruit in such environments assures its constant attendance by the insects and animals which form this ecosystem.

Another hypothesis is that fig production in ancient Israel and Egypt was achieved without the wasp, via a specific way of cutting the fruit, as a means of eliciting artificial ripening.

Sycomores were often planted around artificial pools in ancient Egyptian gardens.

The sycamore tree was brought to the Southern Levant, also known as Israel, by Philistines during the Iron Age, along with opium poppy and cumin. Prior to the Iron Age, the existence of the sycamore is not found in Canaanite, Israelite, Judahite, and Phoenician sites. These sycamore trees used to be numerous in western Beirut, lending their name to the neighborhood of Gemmayzeh ((الْجُمَّيْزَة al-Ǧummayzah), "sycamore fig"). However, the trees have largely disappeared from this area.

== Therapeutic Uses ==
The tree has great medicinal value, since the fruit, bark, leaves, and even the latex are anti-inflammatory in nature. As a result, it has traditionally been used for digestive problems, and shows future potential for the development of therapy for chronic inflammatory illness. In addition, it is useful for the treatment of respiratory issues, and diabetes, as well as wound care.

Although its fruit is edible as a food source, it is considered inferior to the common fig. However, it can also produce an alcoholic beverage via fermentation.

== Practical Uses ==
In Africa, the wood of the tree is used as fuel, both firewood and for charcoal. The wood is also used to produce canoes, stools, doors, houses, and drums. It also can be used to produce rope. The leaves are also very useful for livestock consumption, since they are nutrient rich, providing carbohydrates, fiber, and protein, as well as vitamins C, K, and E8 vitamins.

=== Gardens ===
In the Near East F. sycomorus is an orchard and ornamental tree of extensive use. It has wide-spreading branches and affords shade. It has also been planted successfully in gardens where it is not native, such as Brisbane Botanic Gardens in Australia.

== In culture ==
=== Judaism and Christianity ===
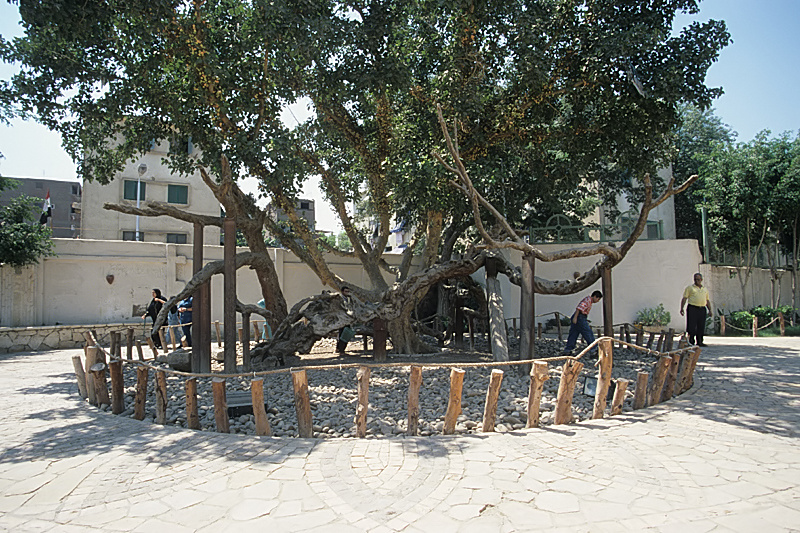
The "Tree of the Virgin" in Egypt.

In the Hebrew Bible, the sycomore is mentioned seven times (Biblical Hebrew: שִׁקְמָה, romanized: shiqmā; Strong's number 8256.) This quote from Kings demonstrates that it was common in Biblical times: "And the king (Solomon) made silver as common in Jerusalem as stones, and cedar as common as the sycamore trees that are in the lowland, because of their abundance.” (I Kings 10:27.) It is also mentioned by the prophet Amos. It is also mentioned once in the New Testament (Koine Greek: συκομoραία, romanized: sykomoraia or συκομορέα sykomorea; Strong's number 4809). It was a popular and valuable fruit tree in Jericho and Canaan.

In El Matareya, there is a sycamore known as the Tree of the Virgin, which serves as a pilgrimage site. It is not the same tree; instead, when the previous tree that stands in this spot dies, a new one is planted from cuttings of the old tree. It is said that the Holy Family took refuge in this tree. The Coptic pope Theophilus also recounted that Joseph had a walking stick, which an infant Jesus broke. When Joseph buried the pieces of the stick, a sycamore grew forth and provided shelter.

=== Other religions ===
In Ancient Egypt, the sycamore was associated with the goddesses Hathor, Isis, and Nut. In the case of the latter, prayers exist referring to the "sycamore of Nut", and asking for water and breath. These goddesses were sometimes depicted as trees, sometimes standing in front of them with vessels of water, or sometimes as a tree with human body parts, such as an arm or breast. It was the most significant depicted life giving tree in ancient Egypt. Sycamores are referenced in ancient Egyptian love poetry as a meeting place for lovers. There are references to twin sycamores of turquoise in funerary contexts which Ra comes forth from, indicating they likely face east, or are located on the eastern horizon.

In modern Egyptian folklore, the sycamore retains an association with mysticism and magic. In the story "It Serves Me Right!", it is used to represent the Tree of Lifespans. The fruit from this tree dries up at the end of a life, but is fresh when one still has more life to live. Therefore, the inhabitants of a land found at the bottom of a well in the story only eat the dry, bad sycamore fruits and leave the good ones alone.

In Kikuyu religion, the sycomore is a sacred tree. All sacrifices to Ngai (or Murungu), the supreme creator, were performed under the tree. The name of the Kikuyu tribe is derived from the name of the tree in Kikuyu (Mũkũyũ). Some of those ceremonies carried out under the tree are still observed.

In the Hindu religion, it is associated with the god Narayana: in response to a challenge by a sage about his abilities, the god flooded the world. Only the fig tree stood about the top of the water. This tree, called Akshaya Vat, is still believed to stand in the holy Hindu city of Allahabad, and is considered sacred. In Buddhism, Siddhartha became enlightened 2,500 years under a Bodhi ficus tree. This old, venerated tree still stands in northern India, in the town of Bodh Gaya.

== Gallery ==
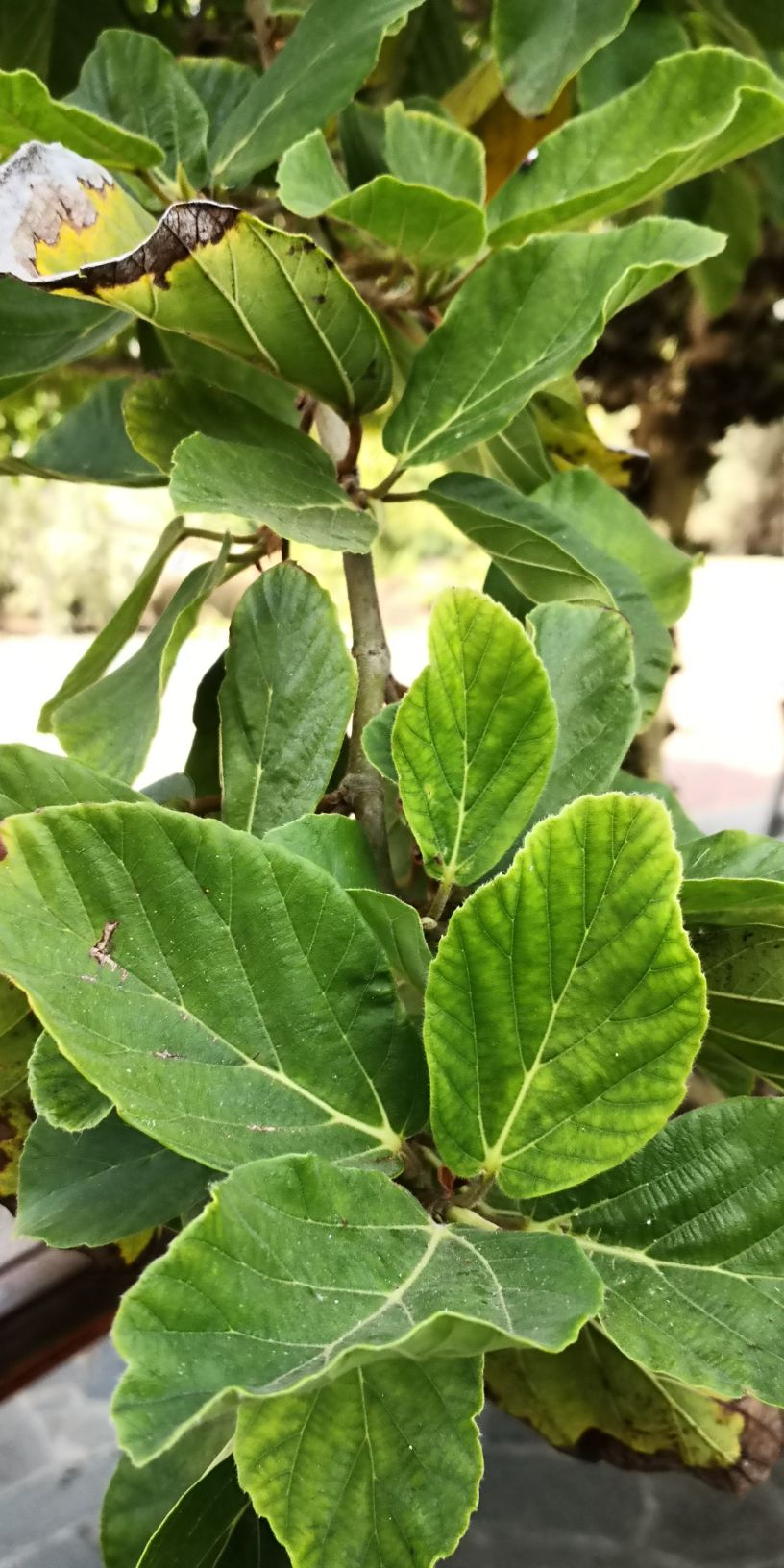
Leaves

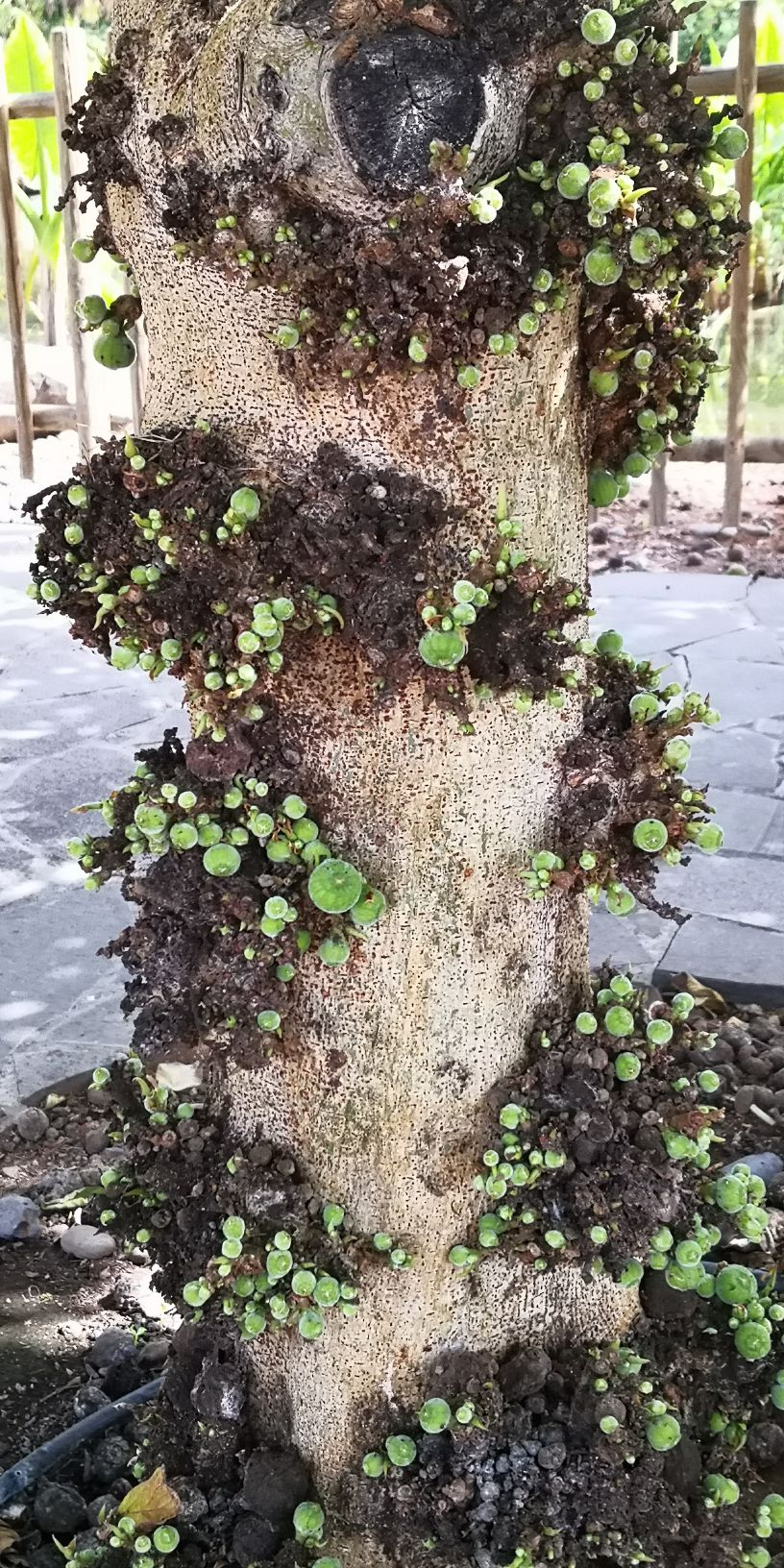
Trunk with unripe fruit

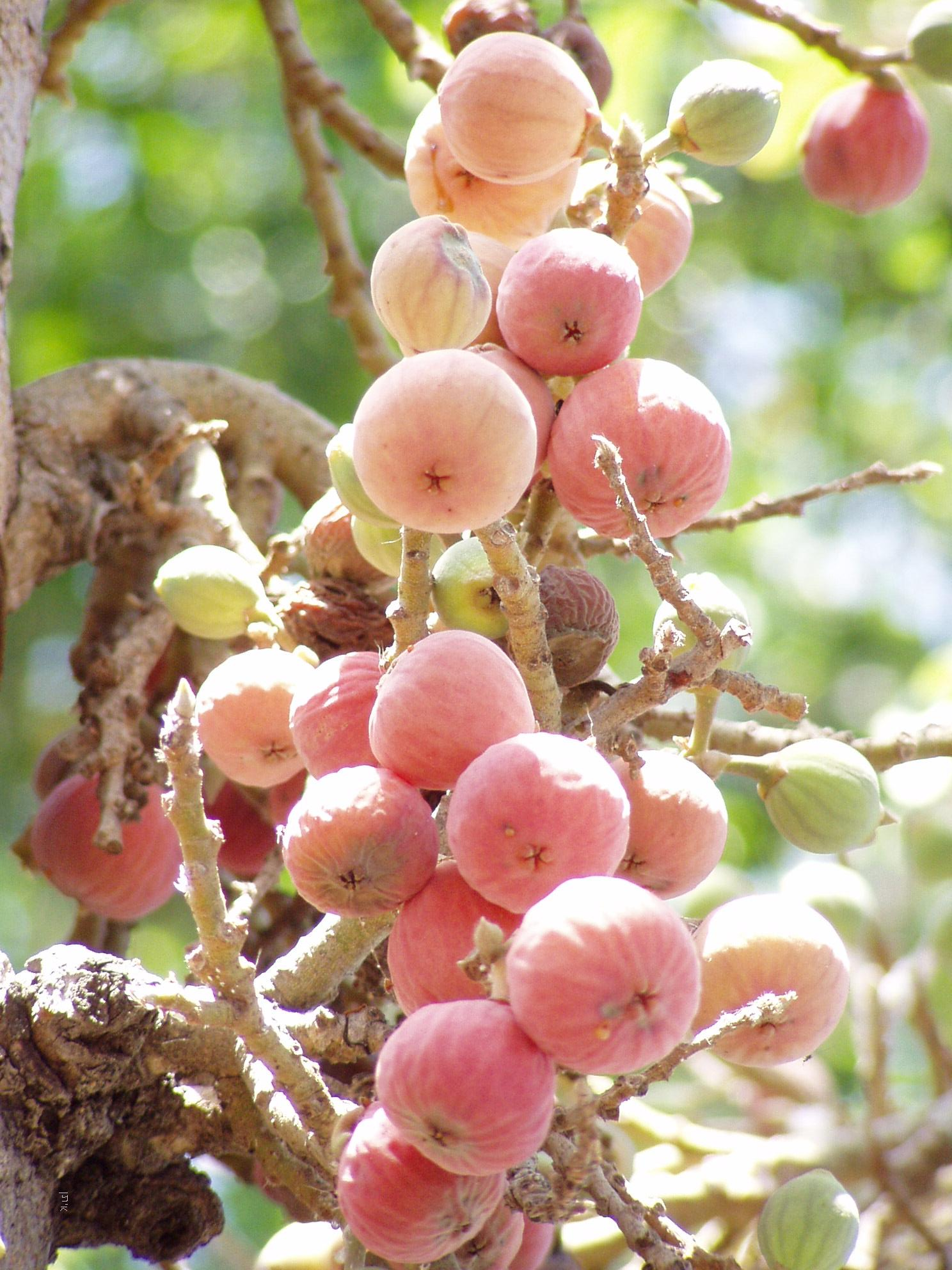
Fruit

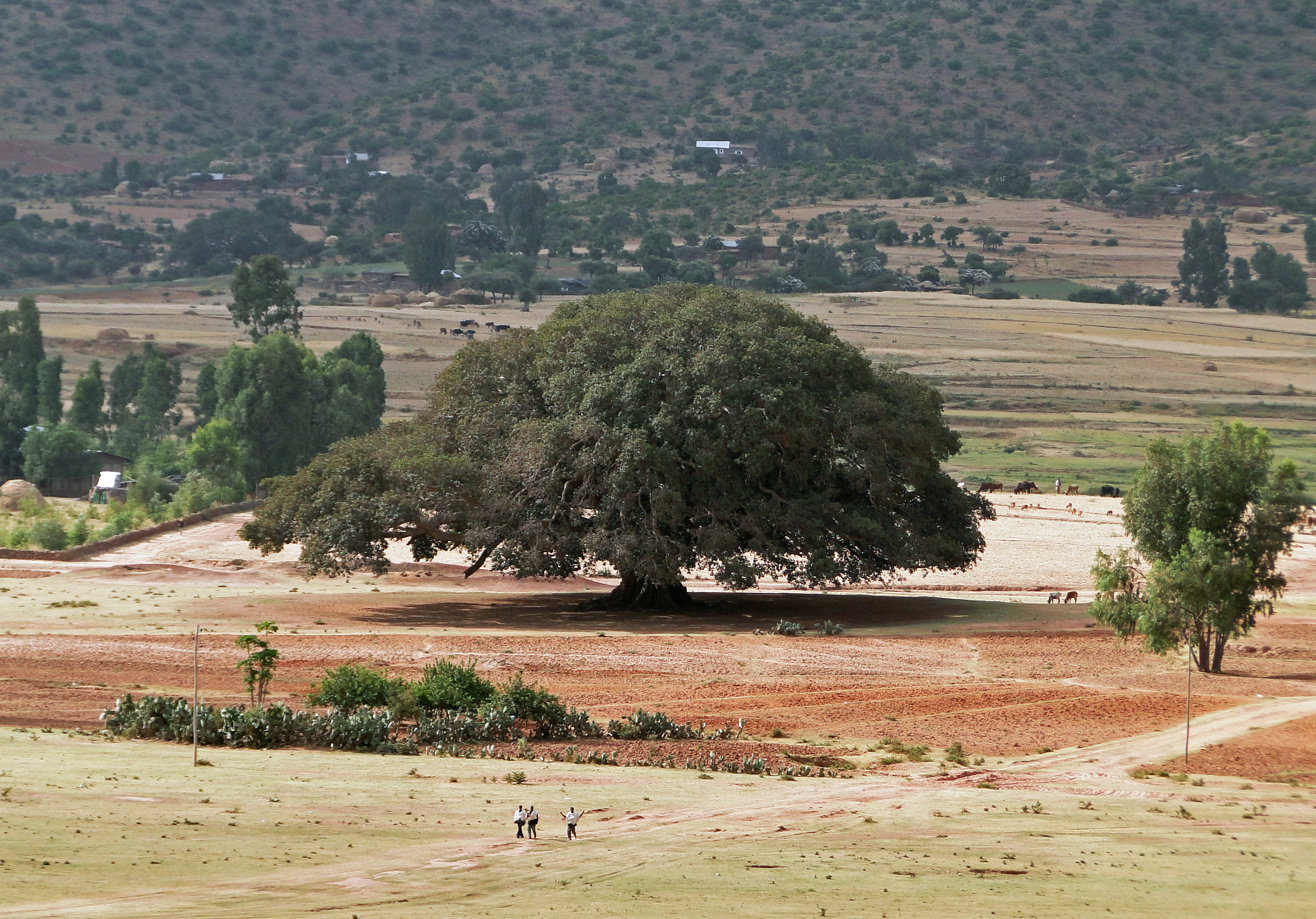
In Ethiopia

== See also ==
- Ficus vasta
- Sycamine
