= Luke 17 =

- ← chapter 16 chapter 18 →
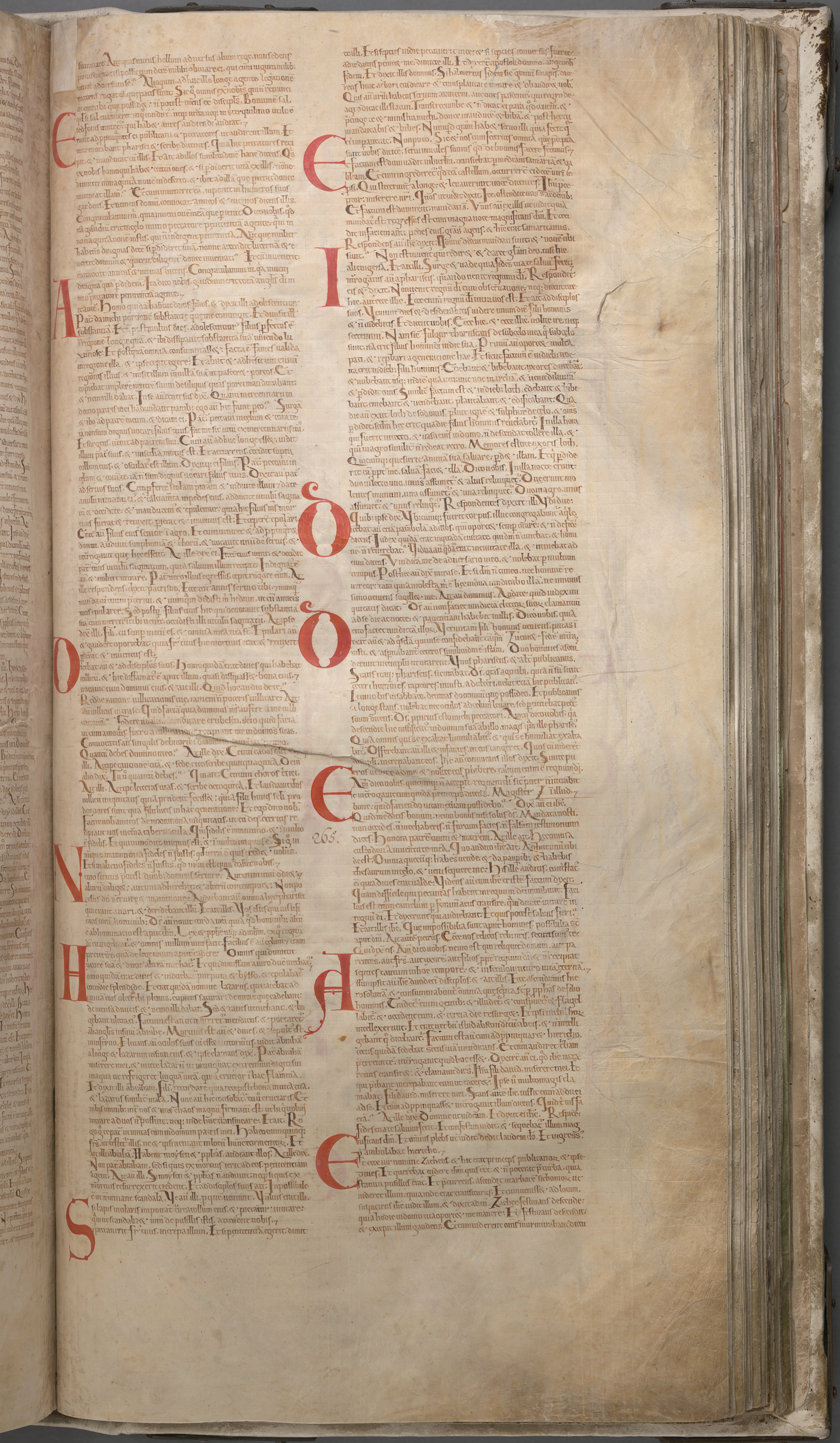
- The Latin text of Luke 14:30–19:7 in Codex Gigas (13th century)
- Book: Gospel of Luke
- Category: Gospel
- Christian Bible part: New Testament
- Order in the Christian part: 3

Luke 17 is the seventeenth chapter of the Gospel of Luke in the New Testament of the Christian Bible. It records "some sayings of Jesus" and the healing of ten lepers. Early Christian tradition uniformly affirmed that Luke the Evangelist composed this Gospel as well as the Acts of the Apostles. Critical opinion on the tradition was evenly divided at the end of the 20th century.

== Text ==
The original text was written in Koine Greek. Some early manuscripts containing the text of this chapter are:

- Papyrus 75 (175–225)
- Papyrus 111 (3rd-century)
- Codex Vaticanus (325–350)
- Codex Sinaiticus (330–360)
- Codex Bezae (~400)
- Codex Washingtonianus (~400)
- Codex Alexandrinus (400–440).

This chapter is divided into 37 verses. The New King James Version divides it into four sections, headed respectively "Jesus Warns of Offences" (verses 1–4), "Faith and Duty" (verses 5–10), "Ten Lepers Cleansed" (verses 11–19) and "The Coming of the Kingdom" (verses 20–37).

== Offences and forgiving of offences (verses 1–10) ==
Verses 1–10 are presented as a single unit in the New International Version. Commenting on the variety of topics covered in the first ten verses, Lutheran biblical writer Harold Buls states that he "assumes that there is logical sequence. The items are not merely picked or chosen by Luke from some outside source".

The first four verses contain a set of "disparate sayings" meant for the community of disciples:

=== Verse 1 ===
Then He [Jesus] said to the disciples, "It is impossible that no offenses should come, but woe to him through whom they do come!"

Jesus warns of "offences" coming, literally "stumbling blocks" (Greek: τὰ σκάνδαλα, skandala). Other translations used are "obstacles" (Jerusalem Bible), "things that cause people to sin" (Buls) and "temptations to sin" (English Standard Version). These are problems liable to arise within the believing community, although among the fathers of the early church, a connection was made with the Pharisees, with whom Jesus had been speaking in the previous chapter.

Reflecting on Jesus' assertion that something might be "impossible", Lutheran Pietist Johann Bengel offers as alternative readings, "it is not a thing usual to happen" or "a thing not admissible in the common course of things", noting similarly that at Luke 13:33 Jesus had said that "it is impossible for a prophet to be killed outside of Jerusalem".

=== Verse 2 ===
It would be better for him if a millstone were hung around his neck, and he were thrown into the sea, than that he should offend one of these little ones.

The "little ones" are the more vulnerable members of the community of disciples. The term appears more frequently in Matthew's gospel than in Luke's.

=== Verses 3b–4 ===
If your brother sins against you, rebuke him; and if he repents, forgive him. And if he sins against you seven times in a day, and seven times in a day returns to you, saying, 'I repent', you shall forgive him.

The Jerusalem Bible suggests that "Luke, apparently, is thinking of a matter that concerns only two of the community". Matthew 18 refers to a process of appealing to the community, which is missing from Luke's writing on this subject.

=== Verse 5 ===
And the apostles said to the Lord, "Increase our faith".

Having previously addressed "the disciples" (Luke 16:1 and 17:1), Jesus speaks now to the apostles, who come to him "with a special request". They feel that the moral strength of their faith in Jesus, i.e. just the loving power of their faith, is not great enough for that great task of forgiveness" which has just set for them in the previous verse: Their request is for "stronger energetic faith", better in quality rather than quantitatively more.

=== Verse 6 ===
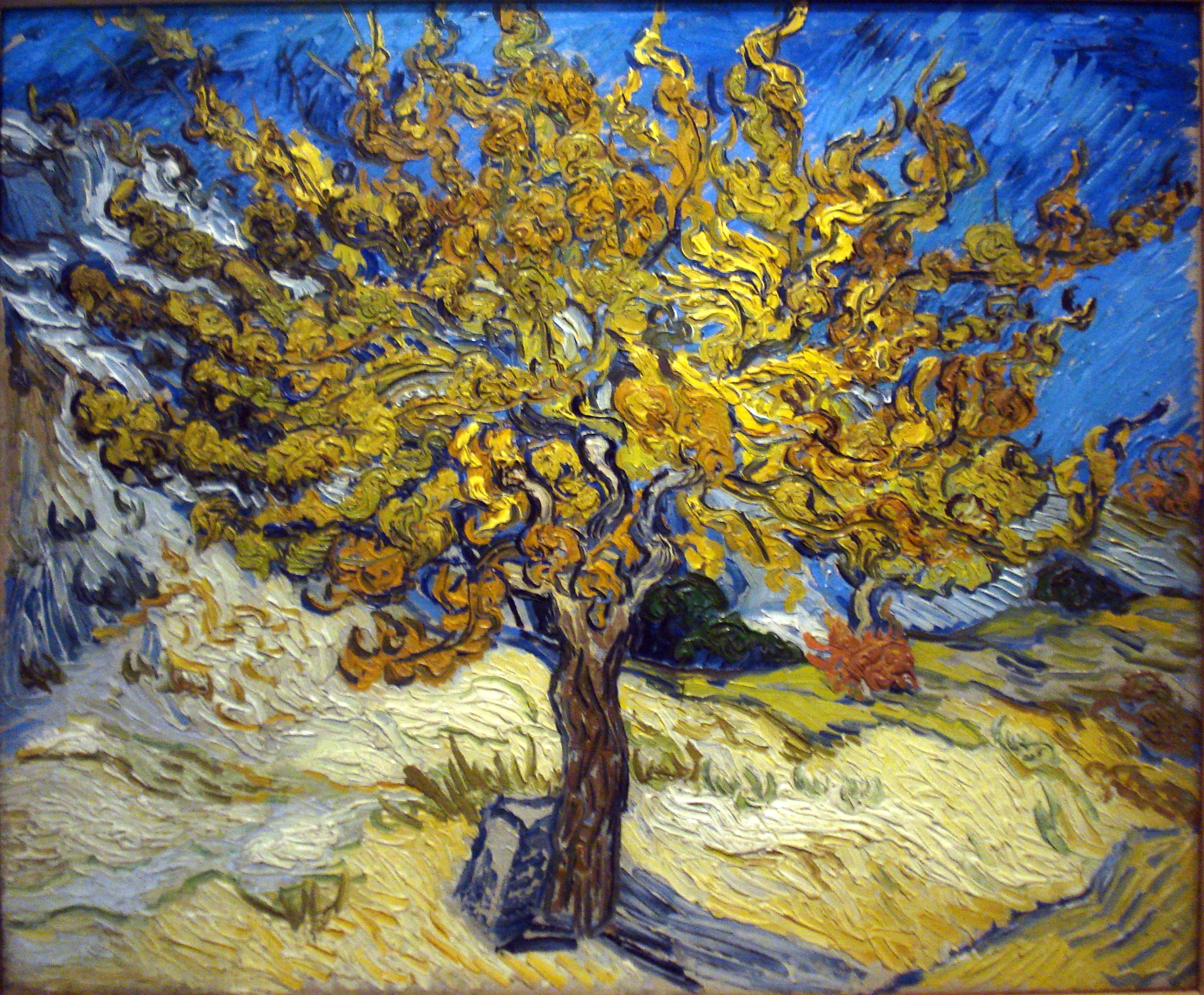
Mulberry Tree by Vincent van Gogh, now in the Norton Simon Museum in Pasadena, California

And the Lord said, "If you had faith like a grain of mustard seed, you could say to this mulberry tree, 'Be uprooted and planted in the sea', and it would obey you."

The King James Version refers to a sycamine tree. Jewish law prohibited the planting of mulberry trees too close to water cisterns because of their strong rooting systems and the physical damage they could cause.

=== Verses 7–10 ===
Jesus describes a master who expects servants who have worked all day in the fields to serve his evening meal as well before seeing to their own needs. Joachim Jeremias considered this parable on service to be "a self-contained unit", while Paul Minear has commented on the "remarkable" degree of consensus among many biblical commentators as to its meaning. It does not appear in the other gospels but it is considered pre-Lucan, although the positioning of this passage after the reference to "the apostles" in verse 5 may have been a deliberate editorial decision in Luke.

== Cleansing ten lepers (verses 11–19) ==
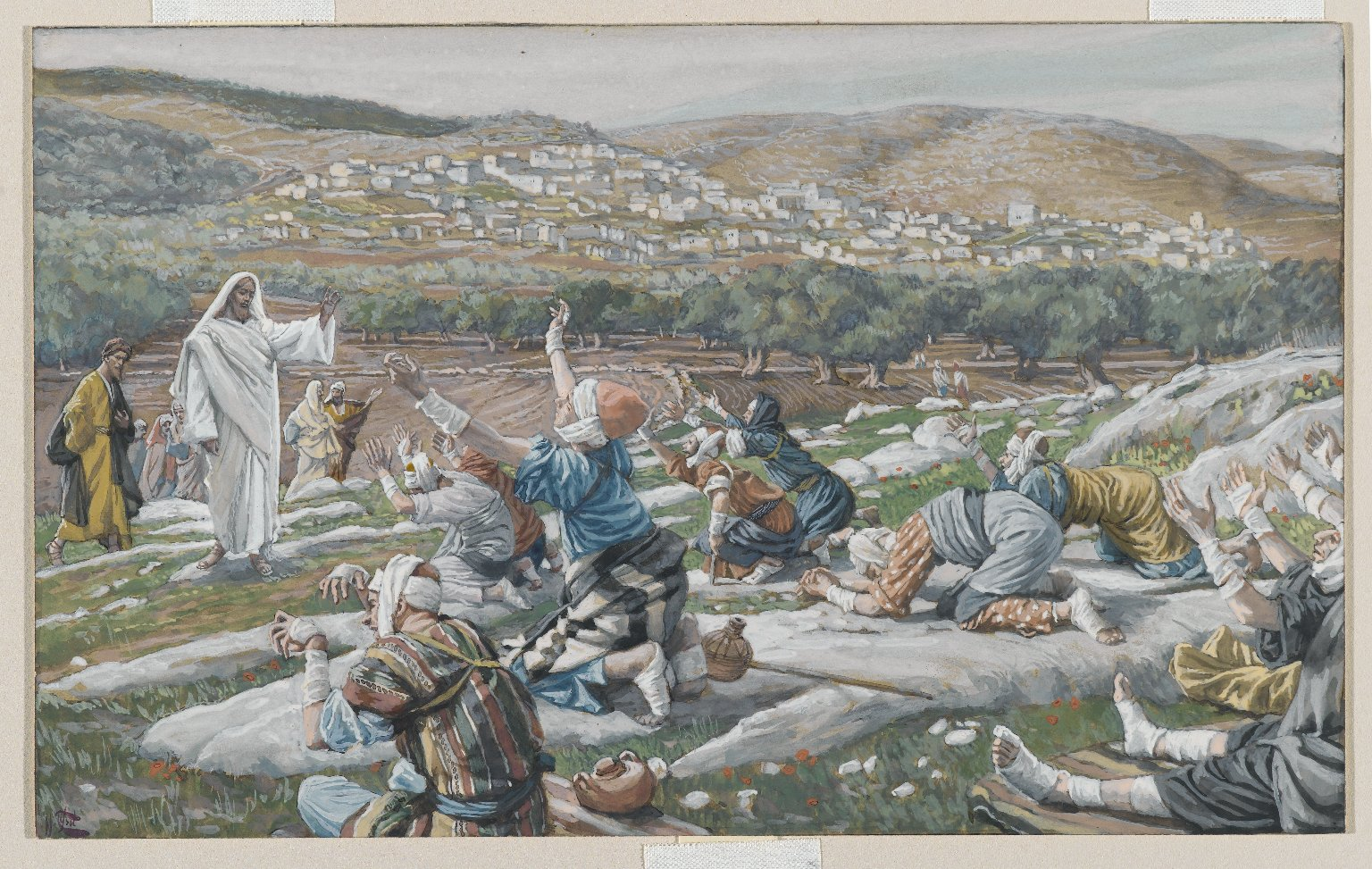
James Tissot, The Healing of Ten Lepers (Guérison de dix lépreux), Brooklyn Museum

This is one of the miracles of Jesus in the Gospels (recorded only in the Gospel of Luke). On his way to Jerusalem, continuing the journey he had begun in Luke 9:51, Jesus traveled along the border between Samaria and Galilee. As he was going into a village, ten men who had leprosy met him. They stood at a distance and called out in a loud voice, "Jesus, Master, have pity on us!" When he saw them, he said: "Go, show yourselves to the priests." And as they went, they were cleansed. One of them, when he saw he was healed, came back, praising God in a loud voice. He threw himself at Jesus' feet and thanked him: this man was a Samaritan. Jesus asked: "Were not all ten cleansed? Where are the other nine? Was no one found to return and give praise to God except this foreigner?" Then he said to him: "Rise and go; your faith has saved you."

This miracle has been described as emphasising the importance of faith, for Jesus did not say: "My power has saved you" but attributed the healing to the faith of the beneficiaries.

== The coming of the kingdom (verses 20–21) ==
=== Verse 20 ===
Now when He was asked by the Pharisees when the kingdom of God would come, He answered them and said, "The kingdom of God does not come with observation";

=== Verse 21 ===
Neither shall they say, Lo here! or, lo there! for, behold, the kingdom of God is within you.

George Leo Haydock suggests that the Pharisees' question is asked "in a mocking and an insulting manner". Buls notes that the enquiry is a 'when?' question whereas Jesus' answer is a 'what?' response: the Pharisees "were expecting the Kingdom of God ... to come soon"; this is "a faulty notion about the character of the Kingdom". Jesus replies that the Kingdom of God does not come "with observation" or "with a visible display": the word Greek: παρατηρήσεως (paratērēseōs, careful observation) appears only here in the New Testament.

In the Greek: η βασιλεια του θεου εντος υμων εστιν, the word εντος (entos) may be translated as either "among" or "within". The more natural meaning is "within", and Baptist theologian John Gill elaborates on how the kingdom of God might be "within" you:

In the elect of God among the Jews, in their hearts; it being of a spiritual nature, and lying in righteousness, and peace, and joy in the Holy Ghost; in the dispossession of Satan, the strong man armed; in the putting down of the old man, sin, with its deceitful lusts, from the throne; and in setting up a principle of grace, as a governing one.

However, reference elsewhere to the Kingdom of God as something which those who respond can "enter into" (see Luke 18: 17, 24-25) argues for the term being understood as "in the midst of you". The editors of the Jerusalem Bible suggest that "among you" is preferable to "within you" because "within you" does not "furnish as direct an answer to the Pharisees' question".

== The day of the Son of Man (verses 22–37) ==
The discourse in Luke 17:22–37 is proper to this gospel. "The day of the Son of Man" reflects the Jerusalem Bible's translation, cf. J. B. Phillips' translation. "One of the days of the Son of Man" is a more accurate translation, but a "strange" form of wording. Luke handles the "end of time" in a different manner from Matthew, whose "discourse on the end times" makes use of similar material. Luke makes a clear distinction between Jesus' prophecy of the destruction of Jerusalem (see Luke 21:6–24) and his own coming in glory at the end of time.

=== Verse 22 ===
And he said to the disciples, "The days are coming when you will desire to see one of the days of the Son of Man, and you will not see it".

The phrase "one of the days of the Son of Man" is an unusual New Testament usage. It suggests not the "end-times" or the coming of Jesus in glory, but for the community of disciples whom Jesus has gathered to continue his ministry, some "glimpse" of the Son on Man to sustain them. Franklin notes that Stephen has a vision of the Son of Man in glory before his accusers start to stone him (Acts 7:55-6) and suggests that Jesus may have been referring to a moment such as this.

=== Verse 26 ===
Just as it was in the days of Noah, so will it be in the days of the Son of Man.

The "days of Noah" were 950 years in all, but the period referred to was the time before the flood. "The days of the Son of Man" may reflect the wording in this verse, and the similar reference to "the days of Lot" in verse 28.

== See also ==
- Leper
- Lot
- Ministry of Jesus
- Miracles of Jesus
- Noah
- Samaritan
- The Kingdom of God is Within You
- Other related Bible parts: Genesis 6, Genesis 7, Genesis 19, Leviticus 14, 2 Kings 5, Matthew 24

Preceded by Luke 16	Chapters of the Bible; Gospel of Luke	Succeeded by Luke 18
