= Luke 19 =

- ← chapter 18 chapter 20 →
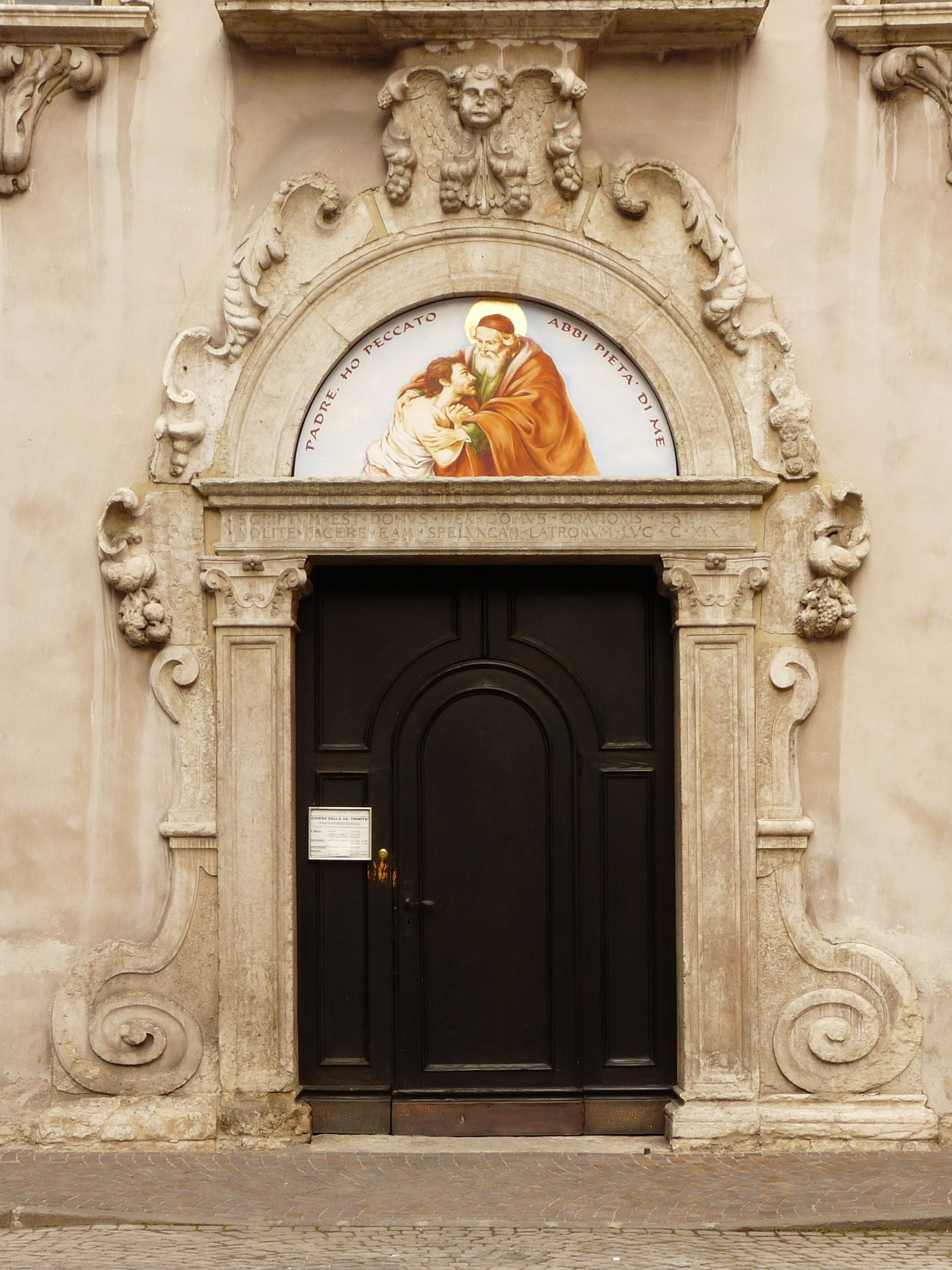
- The inscription of Luke 19:46 in Latin on the architrave at the portal of the church of Santa Trinità, in Trento, Italy
- Book: Gospel of Luke
- Category: Gospel
- Christian Bible part: New Testament
- Order in the Christian part: 3

Luke 19 is the nineteenth chapter of the Gospel of Luke in the New Testament of the Christian Bible. It records Jesus' arrival in Jericho and his meeting with Zacchaeus, the parable of the minas and Jesus' arrival in Jerusalem. Early Christian tradition uniformly affirmed that Luke the Evangelist composed this Gospel as well as the Acts of the Apostles. Critical opinion on the tradition was evenly divided at the end of the 20th century.

== Text ==
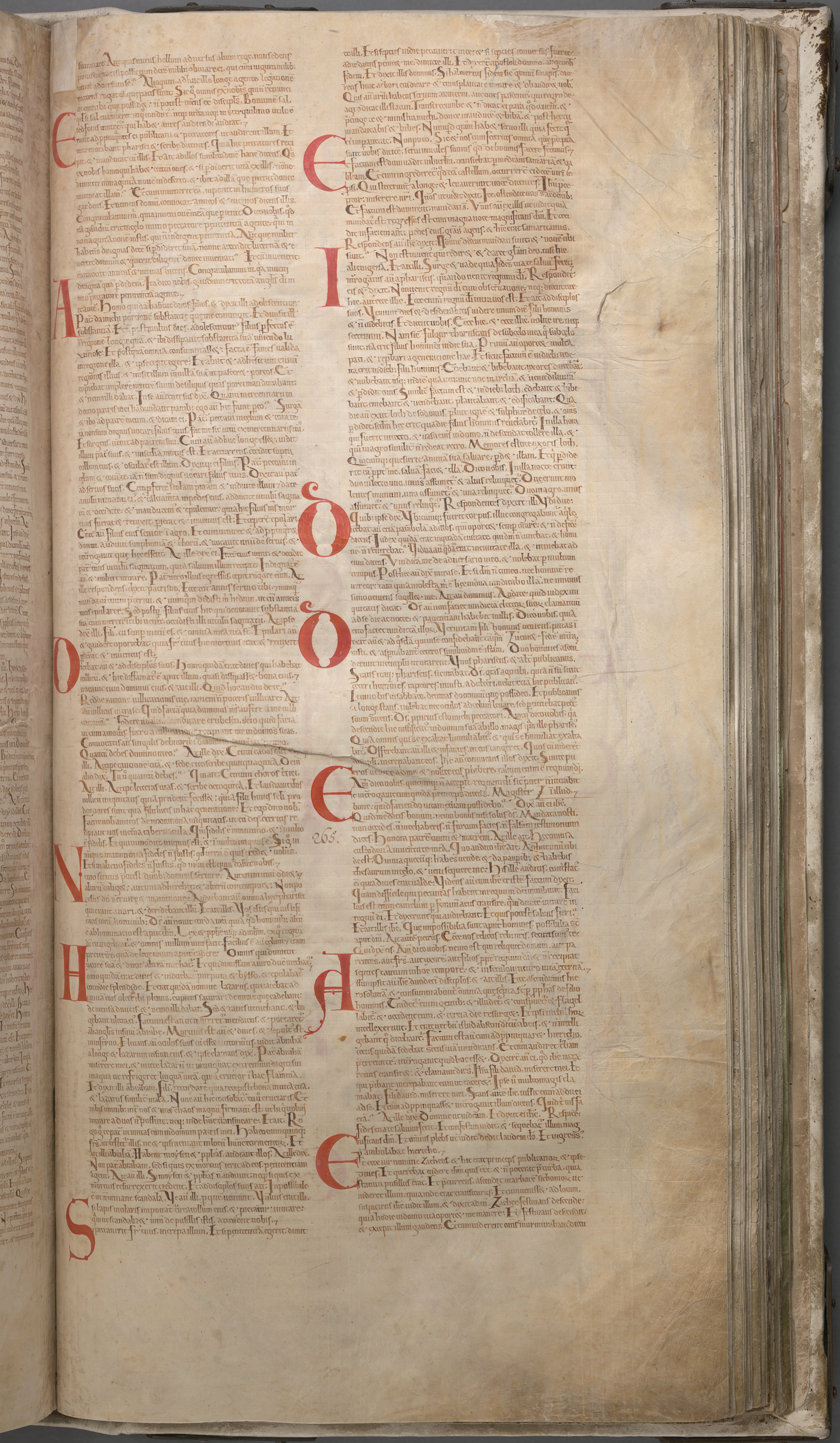
The Latin text of Luke 14:30–19:7 in Codex Gigas (13th century)

The original text was written in Koine Greek. Some early manuscripts containing the text of this chapter are:

- Papyrus 75 (AD 175–225)
- Codex Vaticanus (325–350)
- Codex Sinaiticus (330–360)
- Codex Bezae (~400)
- Codex Washingtonianus (~400)
- Codex Alexandrinus (400–440)
- Codex Ephraemi Rescriptus (~450; extant verses 42–48).

This chapter is divided into 48 verses.

== Old Testament references ==
- Luke 19:38: Psalm 118:26
- Luke 19:46: Isaiah 56:7; Jeremiah 7:11

== Jesus comes to Zacchaeus' house (verses 1–10) ==
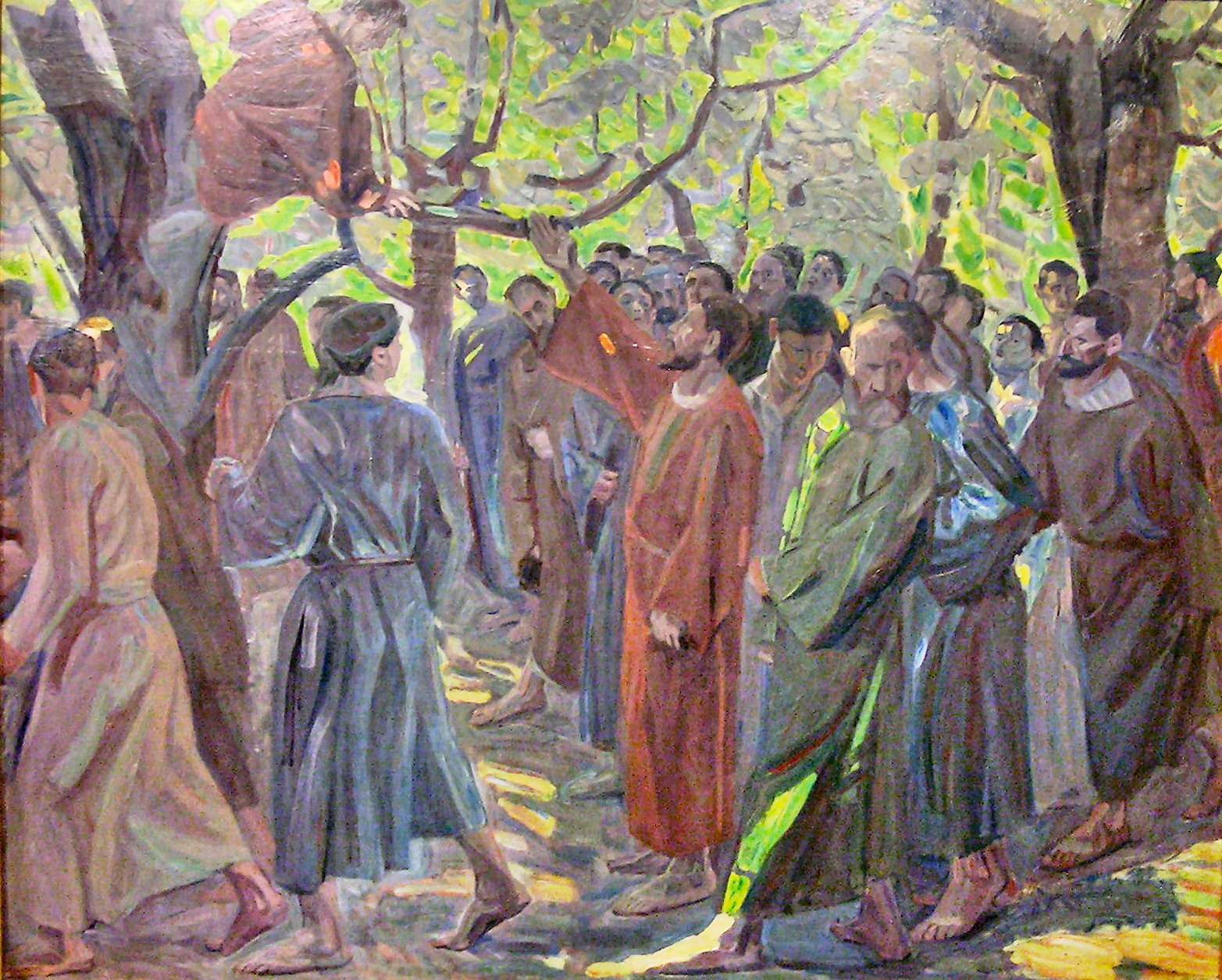
Zacchaeus by Niels Larsen Stevns. Jesus calls Zacchaeus down from his height in the tree.

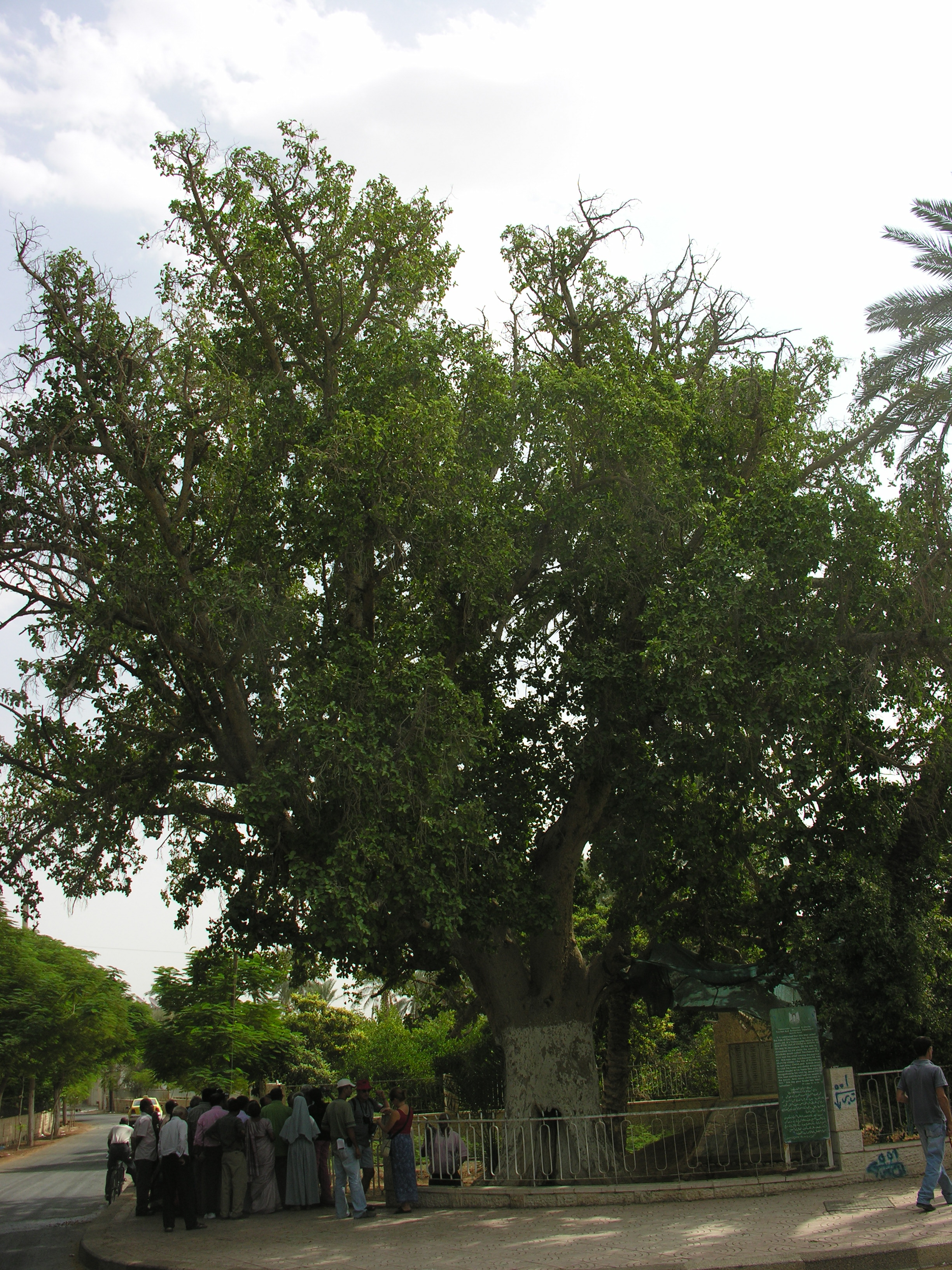
Zacchaeus' sycamore fig in Jericho

Zacchaeus (Greek: Ζακχαῖος, Zakchaios; Hebrew: זכי, 'pure', 'innocent') of Jericho was wealthy, a chief tax collector, mentioned only in the Gospel of Luke. A descendant of Abraham, Zacchaeus is the epitome of someone meeting Jesus' in his earthly mission to bring salvation to the lost. Tax collectors were despised as traitors (working for the Roman Empire, not for their Jewish community), and as being corrupt. This encounter between Jesus and Zacchaeus "is a story of divine grace and the call to holiness". A Methodist/Roman Catholic ecumenical document reflects that

Zacchaeus, an undeserving figure, is nevertheless graciously accepted by Jesus and drawn into a saving relationship with the Lord, which transforms his previously self-centred and selfish existence into holy living. On receiving Jesus’ summons, Zacchaeus instantly resolves to make reparation for his sinful past by promising to give half of his possessions to the poor and repay fourfold all whom he had defrauded.

== Parable of the minas (verses 11–27) ==
Now as they heard these things, He spoke another parable, because He was near Jerusalem and because they thought the kingdom of God would appear immediately.

The journey which Jesus had embarked on "steadfastly" in Luke 9:51 is drawing towards its climax. Hugo Grotius held that "they" (who heard these things) refers to the disciples. Heinrich Meyer argues that "they" were the murmurers of verse 7.

Meyer also notes some uncertainty regarding the chronology of events: verse 5 has Jesus planning to stay with Zacchaeus overnight, whereas verse 28 suggests a more immediate departure for Jerusalem after the telling of the parable.

== Jesus' approach to Jerusalem (verses 28–44) ==
In verse 29, Jesus instructs two of his disciples to take possession of a colt for him to ride. They place their cloaks or "upper garments" on the colt to use as a cushion, and accompany Jesus on his way. Those who throw their cloaks on the road ahead of him (verse 36) are presumably the crowd of his disciples, whose presence is indicated in verses 37-38.

On the downward slope of the Mount of Olives, there is a scene of great rejoicing:

"Blessed is the King who comes in the name of the Lord!
Peace in heaven and glory in the highest!"

The Hebrew word "Hosanna", which appears in the parallel accounts in Matthew and Mark, is not used by Luke. Meyer suggests that Luke's version might reflect a tradition which has avoided using this word.

As he drew near to the city, Jesus wept, anticipating the destruction of the Temple, an occasion known as Flevit super illam in Latin. Another occasion when Jesus wept is recorded in John's gospel following the death of his friend Lazarus. In his lament, Jesus states:

"If you had known, even you, especially in this your day, the things that make for your peace! But now they are hidden from your eyes. For days will come upon you when your enemies will build an embankment around you, surround you and close you in on every side, and level you, and your children within you, to the ground; and they will not leave in you one stone upon another, because you did not know the time of your visitation."

Lutheran biblical scholar Johann Bengel contrasts Jesus' reaction with the immediately preceding scene of rejoicing:

Behold before thee the compassionate King, amidst the very shouts of joy raised by His disciples!
Jesus weeps over Jerusalem, and yet compels no man by force.

The Jerusalem Bible suggests that "your peace" is a reference to "the peace of the messianic age".

=== Verse 28 ===
When He had said this, He went on ahead, going up to Jerusalem.

In many translations, Jesus went on "ahead", i.e. "in front of" his disciples. Erasmus, Kypke, Kuinoel, Heinrich Ewald and others translate as "He went forwards", i.e. he pursued his journey, cf. the God's Word to the Nations translation, "he continued on his way".

=== Verses 41–44 ===
As with Luke's earlier text at Luke 13:34–35, Jesus contemplates the significance and fate of Jerusalem, the holy city. This passage is rich in Old Testament allusions.

== Jesus in the Temple (verses 45–48) ==
=== Verse 46 ===
[Jesus] Saying unto them, It is written, My house is the house of prayer: but ye have made it a den of thieves.

In expelling the dealers from the Temple, Jesus' words draw from both Isaiah 56:7 (a house of prayer for all nations) and Jeremiah 7:11 (a den of thieves). Matthew 21:13 and Mark 11:17 have the same quotations.

=== Verse 47 ===
And He was teaching daily in the temple. But the chief priests, the scribes, and the leaders of the people sought to destroy Him.

Luke reiterates at Luke 21:37 and 23:27 that Jesus taught in the Temple on a daily basis. Anglican churchman Henry Alford suggests that this "general description" of Jesus' engagement in the temple is fittingly located at the end of the chapter which concludes his "last journey to Jerusalem". Alexander Maclaren refers to his "calm courage" in continuously teaching there.

=== Verse 48 ===
and [they] were unable to do anything; for all the people were very attentive to hear Him.

Literally, the people “were hanging from him”, i.e. hung on His lips. The Jerusalem Bible translates this as "the people as a whole hung on his words".

== See also ==
- Jericho
- Mina
- Ministry of Jesus
- Parables of Jesus
- Sycamore tree
- Zacchaeus
- Related Bible parts: Isaiah 56, Jeremiah 7, Zechariah 9, Matthew 21, Matthew 25, Mark 11, John 2, John 12

Preceded by Luke 18	Chapters of the Bible; Gospel of Luke	Succeeded by Luke 20
