= Self-righteousness =

Feeling or display of moral superiority

Self-righteousness (also called sanctimony, sententiousness, and holier-than-thou attitudes) is an attitude and belief of moral superiority derived from a person deeming their own beliefs, actions, or affiliations to be of greater virtue than those of the average person. Self-righteous individuals are intolerant of the opinions and behaviors of others that they deem to be less moral and virtuous. A self-righteous person will often exhort or rebuke certain behaviors and actions from others.

== See also ==
- Elitism
- Mississippi Squirrel Revival
- Narcissism
- Sanctimommy
- Signalling theory
- Superiority complex
- The Mote and the Beam
- The Pharisee and the Publican
- Virtue signalling
