= Parable of the Unjust Judge =

Parable of Jesus in the Gospel of Luke

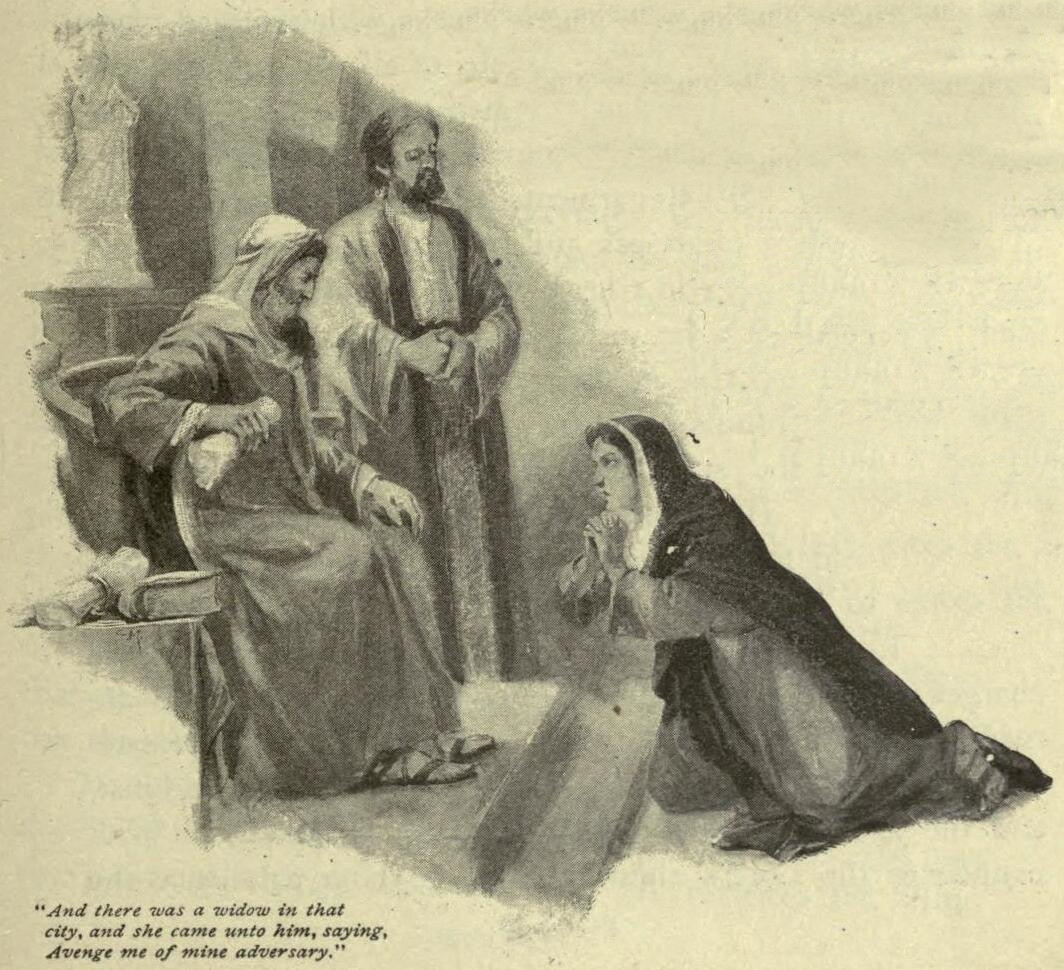
Avenge me of mine adversary (anonymous), contracted by Pacific Press Publishing Company (1900)

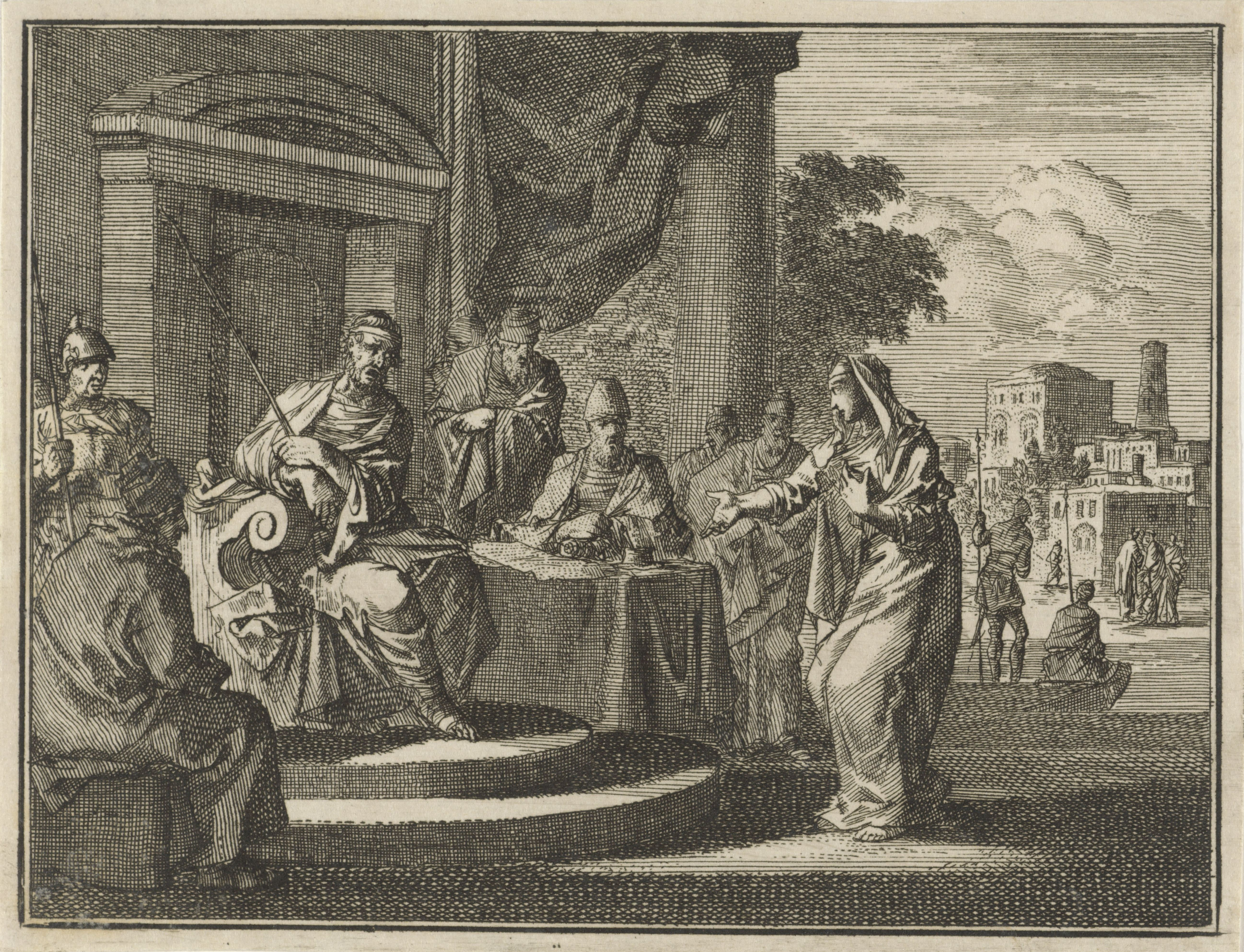
The parable of the unjust judge, by Jan Luyken, 1712

The Parable of the Unjust Judge (also known as the Parable of the Importunate Widow or the Parable of the Persistent Woman) is one of the parables of Jesus which appears in the Gospel of Luke (Luke 18:1–8). In it, a judge who lacks compassion is repeatedly approached by a woman seeking justice. Initially rejecting her demands, he eventually honors her request so that he will not be worn out by her persistence.

One interpretation of this parable is that it teaches the principle of never giving up. It is found immediately prior to the parable of the Pharisee and the Publican (also on prayer) and is similar to the Parable of the Friend at Night. Other scholars note that the content of the parable makes no reference to prayer beyond the first verse, and that the introduction of prayer as a theme is generally inspired by the Lukan construction in verses 6–8 and by the fact that Luke placed the parable of the Pharisee and Publican immediately after this one. Whatever approach is taken, it is noteworthy that the judge in the parable does not act on the basis of justice.

Joel B. Green sees in this parable an injunction not to lose heart, in the light of the eschatological tone of Luke 17:20–37, and also an echo of Sirach 35: "For he is a God of justice, who knows no favorites. [...] The prayer of the lowly pierces the clouds; it does not rest till it reaches its goal, nor will it withdraw till the Highest responds, judges justly and affirms the right."

== Title of the pericope ==
The 1599 Geneva Bible refers to this narrative as "the parable of the unrighteous Judge and the widow". Several translations (English Standard Version, Evangelical Heritage Version, New American Bible Revised Edition) call it "The Parable of the Persistent Widow". The New Catholic Bible calls it "The Parable of the Importunate Widow". It is referred to as the "Parable of the Widow and the Unjust Judge" by the Revised Standard Version.

== Narrative ==
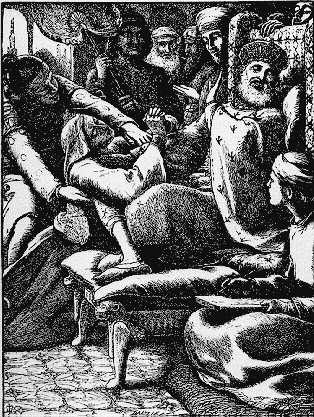
Parable of the Unjust Judge by John Everett Millais (1863)

Luke reports the parable as follows:

Then Jesus told his disciples a parable to show them that they should always pray and not give up. He said: "In a certain town there was a judge who neither feared God nor cared about men. And there was a widow in that town who kept coming to him with the plea, 'Grant me justice against my adversary.'

"For some time he refused. But finally he said to himself, 'Even though I do not fear God or care about men, yet because this widow keeps bothering me, I will see that she gets justice, so that she will not eventually wear me out with her coming!'"

And the Lord said, "Listen to what the unjust judge says. And will not God bring about justice for his chosen ones, who cry out to him day and night? Will he keep putting them off? I tell you, he will see that they get justice, and quickly. However, when the Son of Man comes, will he find faith on the earth?"

— Luke 18:1–8, New International Version

== Interpretation ==
Irenaeus taught that the parable was about the End Times. He says that the Unjust Judge symbolizes the Antichrist, and the persistent widow symbolizes the earthly Jerusalem.

The framing material of the parable in the Gospel of Luke demonstrates the need to always pray like the persistent widow, for if even an unjust judge will eventually listen, God is much quicker to do so. The parable of the Friend at Night has a similar meaning.

Joel B. Green sees in this parable an injunction not to lose heart, in the light of the eschatological tone of Luke 17:20–37, and also an echo of Sirach 35: "For he is a God of justice, who knows no favorites. [...] The prayer of the lowly pierces the clouds; it does not rest till it reaches its goal, nor will it withdraw till the Highest responds, judges justly and affirms the right."

William Barclay says that the point of the parable is less about persistent prayer, but rather the contrast between God and men in the phrase "how much more". In prayer, one is speaking to a Father ready to give.

Cornelius a Lapide comments on this parable, writing, "Hence the heretics called Euchitæ wished, but without reason, to be always praying and to do no manual work. But it is written, 'If any man will not work, neither let him eat' (2 Thess. 3:10). 'Always' here seems to mean sedulously, perseveringly, diligently, assiduously as in other things, and at befitting times, especially when temptation, persecution, and affliction are hard at hand. It is impossible for us to pray always and at all times. We must have a time for eating, drinking, labouring, etc. The word 'always' means, therefore, not continuance but perseverance in prayer: that is, that we should set apart fit times for prayer, and not cease to pray until we have obtained what we need and what we ask for."

Anglican clergyman Henry Alford comments on verses 4-5:

For a while he refused, but afterward he said to himself, "Though I neither fear God nor respect man, ^{5} yet because this widow keeps bothering me, I will give her justice, so that she will not beat me down by her continual coming."

"The point of this part of the parable is the extortion of right from such a man by importunity. His act was not an act of justice, but of injustice; his very ἐκδίκησις was ἀδικία, because he did it from self-regard, and not from a sense of duty."

== See also ==
- Life of Jesus in the New Testament
- Ministry of Jesus
