= Moral superiority =

Moral superiority is the belief or attitude that one's position and actions are justified by having higher moral values than others.

It can refer to:

- Morality, when two systems of morality are compared
  - Moral high ground
- Self-righteousness, when proclamations and posturing of moral superiority become a negative personal trait
- Superiority complex, when the moral superiority is a psychological reaction to insecurity and self-doubt

== See also ==
- Moral absolutism
- Moral equivalence
- Moral relativism
- Moral universalism
