= Sanctimommy =

Term for outspokenly opinionated parents

Sanctimommy is a portmanteau of two words, sanctimonious and mommy. The word is a colloquialism used to refer to a person, usually a female, who has very opinionated views on child rearing and presents them upfront without any sense of humility.

== Occurrence ==
Generally speaking the word has been used in the blogosphere, to refer to people who give their opinions in a fashion that provokes anger, and seems to be condescending.
