= Parable of the Friend at Night =

Parable taught by Jesus of Nazareth according to the Christian Gospel of Luke

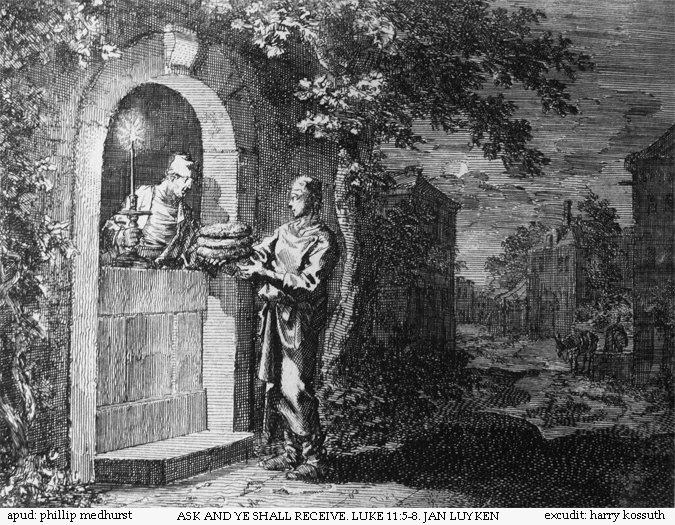
Etching by Jan Luyken illustrating the ending of the parable, from the Bowyer Bible.

The Parable of the Friend at Night (also known as the Parable of the Friend at Midnight or of the Importunate Neighbour) is a parable of Jesus which appears in Luke 11:5–8. In it, a friend eventually agrees to help his neighbor due to his persistent demands rather than because they are friends, despite the late hour and the inconvenience of it.

This parable demonstrates the need to pray without giving up. It is similar to the Parable of the Unjust Judge and is depicted by several artists, including William Holman Hunt.

An alternate interpretation, especially since this parable is part of a sequence on prayer, would maintain that the point of the parable is not about persistent prayer, but rather that God answers the prayers of his children because it is His very nature to do so.

== Narrative ==
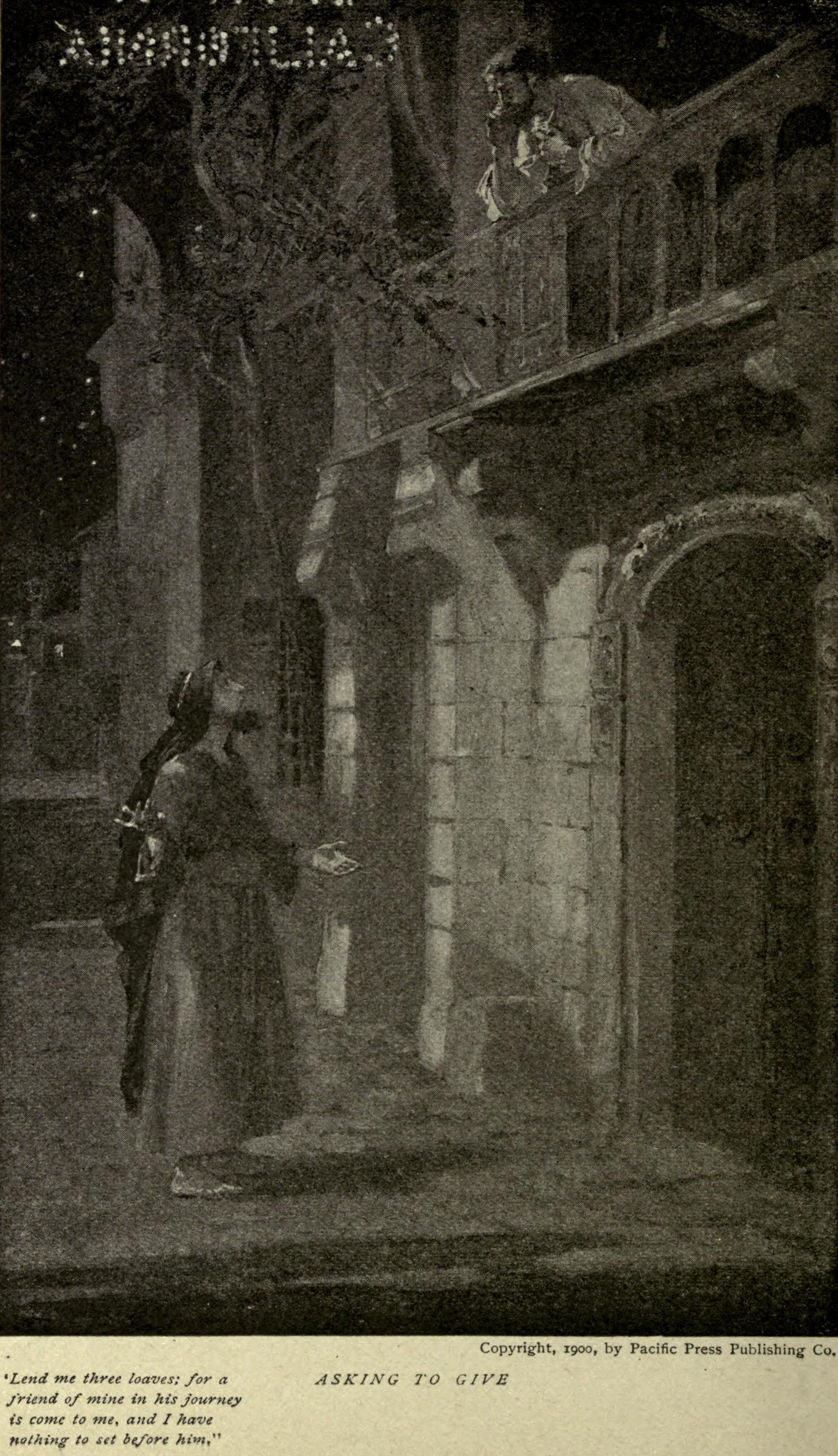
Anonymous artist hired by Pacific Press Publishing Co., 1900

The parable is as follows:

He said to them, "Which of you, if you go to a friend at midnight, and tell him, 'Friend, lend me three loaves of bread, for a friend of mine has come to me from a journey, and I have nothing to set before him,' and he from within will answer and say, 'Don't bother me. The door is now shut, and my children are with me in bed. I can't get up and give it to you'? I tell you, although he will not rise and give it to him because he is his friend, yet because of his persistence, he will get up and give him as many as he needs."

— Luke 11:5-8, World English Bible

The scene described in this parable suggests a single-roomed peasant house, where the whole family sleeps together on a mat on the floor, and a man travelling by night to avoid the heat of the day. The reason for the friend's request is hospitality, a sacred duty throughout the Mediterranean world in antiquity.

== Interpretation ==
This parable appears in the Gospel of Luke immediately after Jesus teaches the Lord's Prayer, and can therefore be viewed as a continuation of Jesus teaching his disciples how to pray, while the verses which follow help to explain the meaning of the parable:

"I tell you, keep asking, and it will be given you. Keep seeking, and you will find. Keep knocking, and it will be opened to you. For everyone who asks receives. He who seeks finds. To him who knocks it will be opened."

— Luke 11:9-10, World English Bible

Joel B. Green suggests that the question that opens the parable ("Which of you who has a friend...?" also expressible as "Can you imagine...?") is intended to be answered as an emphatic "No!", since no friend would refuse to help under such circumstances (the opening words in Greek occur elsewhere in Luke, but have no contemporary parallels, and I. Howard Marshall regards them as probably characteristic of Jesus himself). However, Jesus goes on to point out that even if friendship wasn't a big enough motivation, help would still be forthcoming. As with verses Luke 11:9–13, the parable is therefore an incentive to pray. The parable of the Unjust Judge has a similar meaning.

John McEvilly comments on this parable, writing, "Our Lord illustrates by the following parable—which St. Luke alone records—or familiar comparison, founded on what might occur in daily life to any of themselves, the necessity of fervour and perseverance in prayer. All the circumstances are of a very pressing character—the hour of the night so inconvenient, the urgent necessity of the case, not even the simplest means of meeting the wants of the stranger, fatigued and hungry from his journey. Hence, the petition for “three loaves,” one for the host himself, one for the hungry, fatigued guest, and a third in case the two did not suffice. In the East the home-made cakes were small."

Cornelius a Lapide gives a similar interpretation, writing, "God wills that we should continue instant in prayer, and is pleased with our “importunity,” for persistent prayer is “violence pleasing to God.” Tertullian."

== Depictions ==
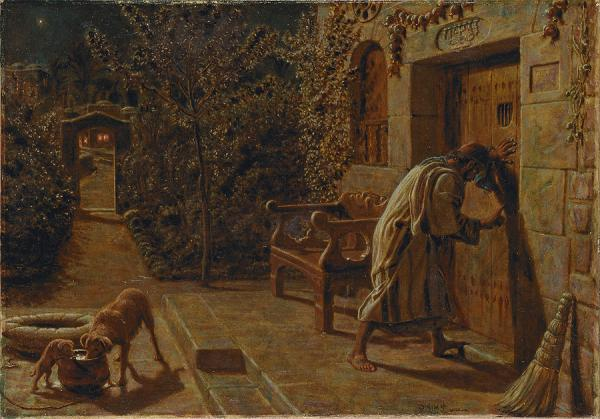
William Holman Hunt's The Importunate Neighbour (1895) depicts the beginning of the parable.

There are a number of depictions of this parable, the most famous being The Importunate Neighbour (1895) by William Holman Hunt, held in the National Gallery of Victoria, Australia.

== See also ==
- Life of Jesus in the New Testament
- Ministry of Jesus
- Parable of the Unjust Judge
