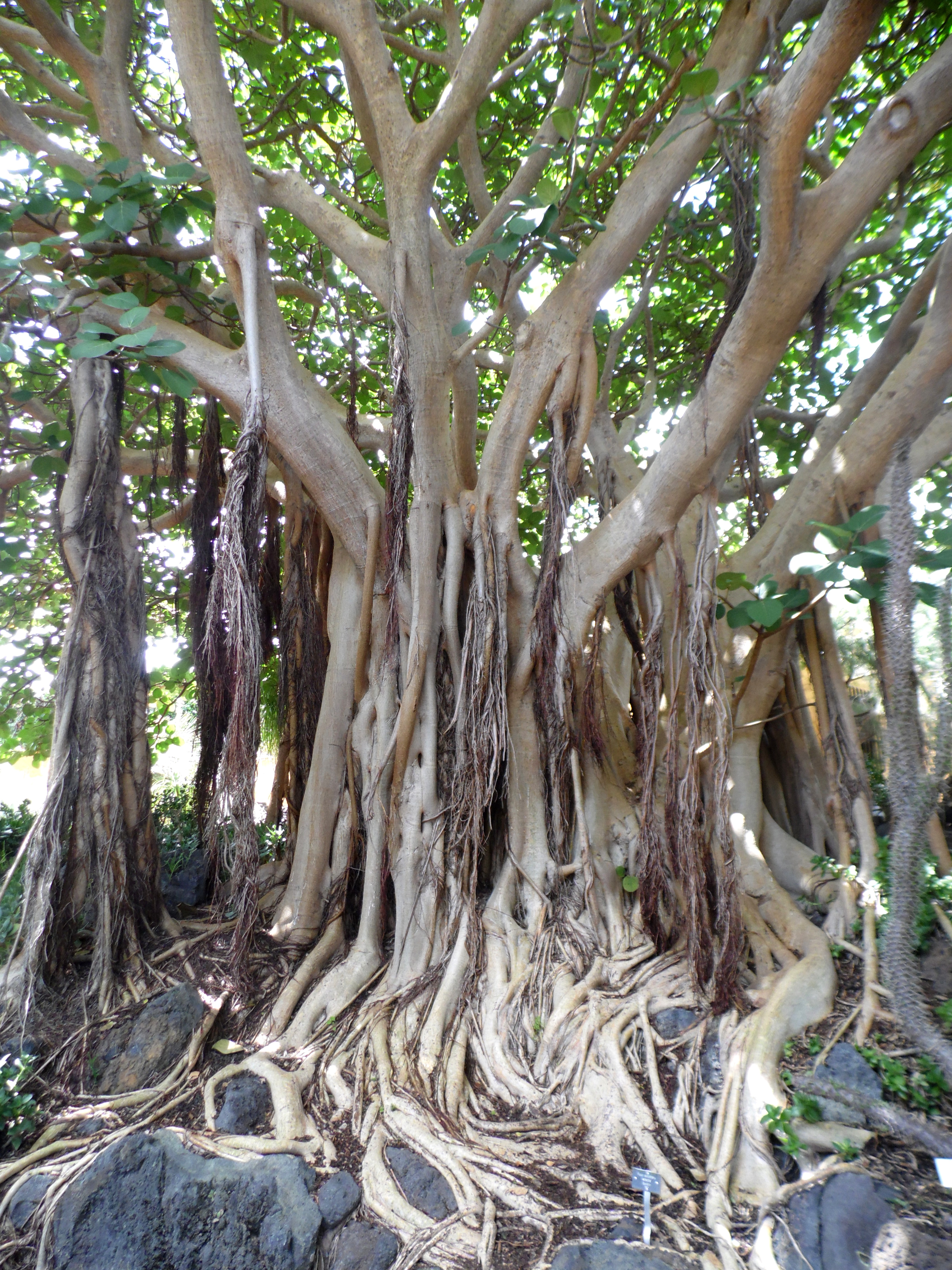

Conservation status
- Least Concern (IUCN 3.1)

Scientific classification
- Kingdom: Plantae
- Clade: Tracheophytes
- Clade: Angiosperms
- Clade: Eudicots
- Clade: Rosids
- Order: Rosales
- Family: Moraceae
- Genus: Ficus
- Species: F. vasta

Binomial name
- Ficus vasta Forssk.

Synonyms
- Ficus callabatensis Warb.; Ficus dahro Delile; Ficus hararensis Warb.; Ficus rivae Warb.; Ficus socotrana Balf.f.; Ficus vasta var. glabrescens Hutch.; Ficus vasta var. velutina Fiori; Sycomorus dahro (Delile) Walp.

= Ficus vasta =

Species of flowering plant

Ficus vasta (Amharic: ዋርካ; Warka), (Arabic: تالوقة; Talouqa) is a fig plant found in Ethiopia and Yemen. The tree is a species of sycamore-fig.

== Description ==
Ficus vasta is a large tree, with a massive trunk, and spreading branches whose tips form an inverted bowl up to 50 m (160 ft) in diameter. It reaches a height of 25 m (82 ft). The trunk is smooth and grey and is commonly buttressed. The bark is smooth and grey, except on young branches where it is yellow-white-brown, and flaking when dry. The leaves are elliptical, reaching 25 cm × 20 cm (9.8 in × 7.9 in), hairy, and rough to the touch. They are often distinguished from other species of fig by its large heart-shaped leaves and massive trunk.

The figs grow in clusters, are 2 cm (0.79 in) in diameter, and are spherical. When ripe they are green with pale green spots. They are hairy and their opening is clear.

Ficus vasta grows as an epiphyte or as a chasmophyte. As the young tree grows, it sends down roots that thicken and become trunk-like, often fusing and completely engulfing the trunk of the tree or rock it grew on. This process often kills the host tree and completely engulfs or covers the rock face.

== Uses ==
The figs are edible, and being collected by children. They are also eaten by sheep, goats, monkeys (including baboons), and birds. The figs can be eaten right off the tree, or when half-dry, or when dry. Dry figs are usually stored and eaten as needed.

== Ecology ==
Ficus vasta grows in and around the Horn of Africa and southern Arabian Peninsula. It is primarily endemic to Ethiopia and Yemen, but can also be found in Djibouti, Eritrea, Oman, Saudi Arabia, Socotra, Somalia, and Sudan, and into Uganda and Tanzania in the African Great Lakes region. The tree grows along rivers forming stands or thickets. Additionally, it is found in dry savannah and grows at elevations between 1,400 and 2,500 m (4,590 and 8,200 ft). It is not cultivated under domestication, and is disappearing due to human pressure, mainly in its use as firewood.

== See also ==
- Strangler fig
