= Parable of the Budding Fig Tree =

Parable in the New Testament

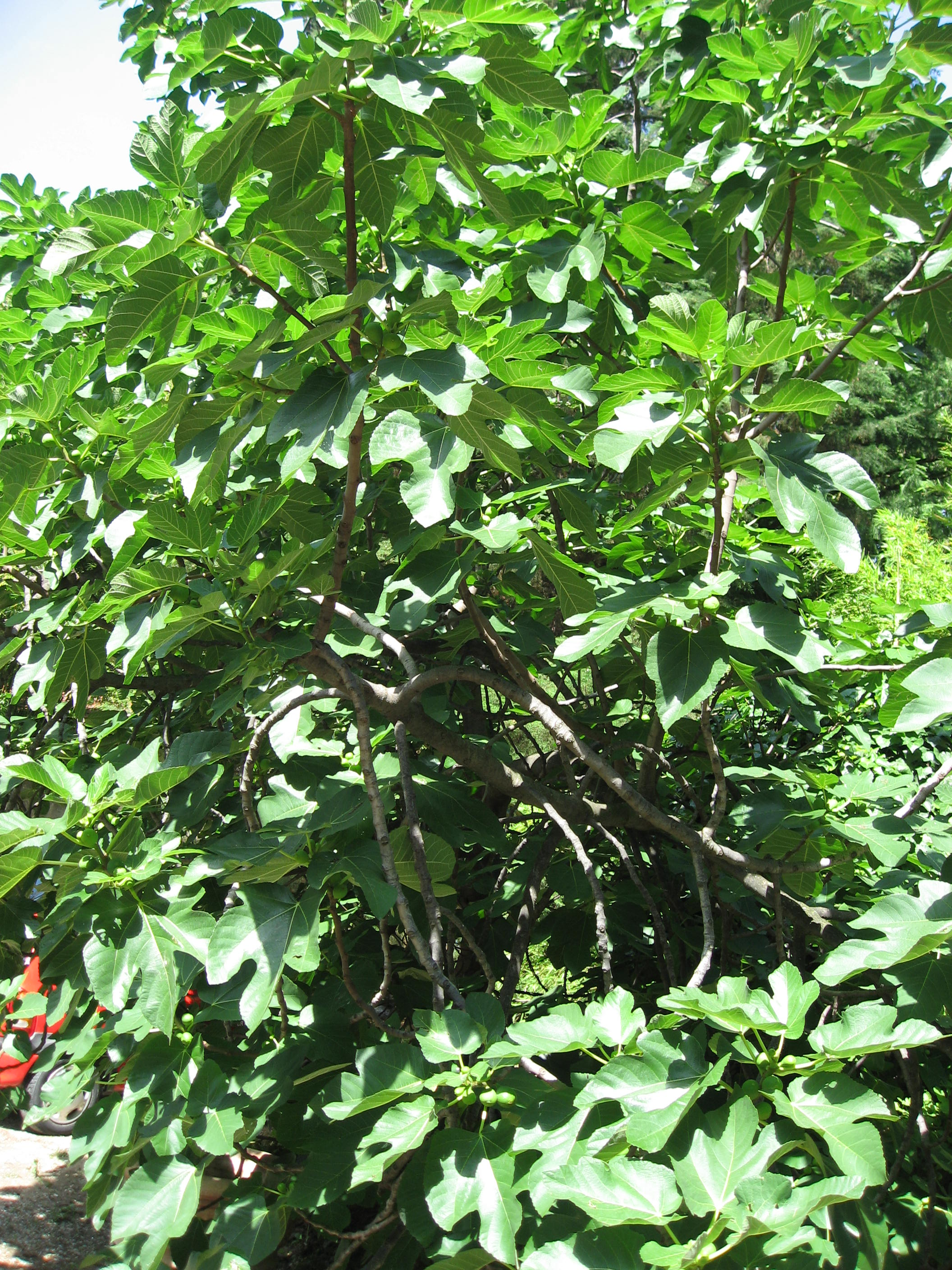
A fig tree

The Parable of the Budding Fig Tree is a parable told by Jesus in the New Testament, found in Matthew 24:32–35, Mark 13:28–31, and Luke 21:29–33. This parable, about the Kingdom of God, involves a fig tree, as does the equally brief parable of the barren fig tree.

== Narrative ==
According to the Gospel of Luke:

Then he told them a parable: "Look at the fig tree and all the trees; as soon as they sprout leaves you can see for yourselves and know that summer is already near. So also, when you see these things taking place, you know that the kingdom of God is near. Truly I tell you, this generation will not pass away until all things have taken place. Heaven and earth will pass away, but my words will not pass away."

— Luke 21:29–33

== Interpretations ==
Luke presents this parable as eschatological in nature: like the leaves of the fig tree, the signs spoken of in the Olivet Discourse of Luke 21:5–28 indicate the coming of the Kingdom of God.

As the British scholar and theologian N. T. Wright has written, "Already present in Jesus' ministry, and climactically inaugurated in his death and resurrection, the divine kingdom will be manifest within a generation, when Jesus and his followers are vindicated in and through the destruction of Jerusalem."

== See also ==
- Figs in the Bible
- Fruit of the Holy Spirit
- Life of Jesus in the New Testament
- Luke 21
- Mark 13
- Matthew 24
- Olivet Discourse
- The Tree and its Fruits
- The Vine
