= Luke 22 =

- ← chapter 21 chapter 23 →
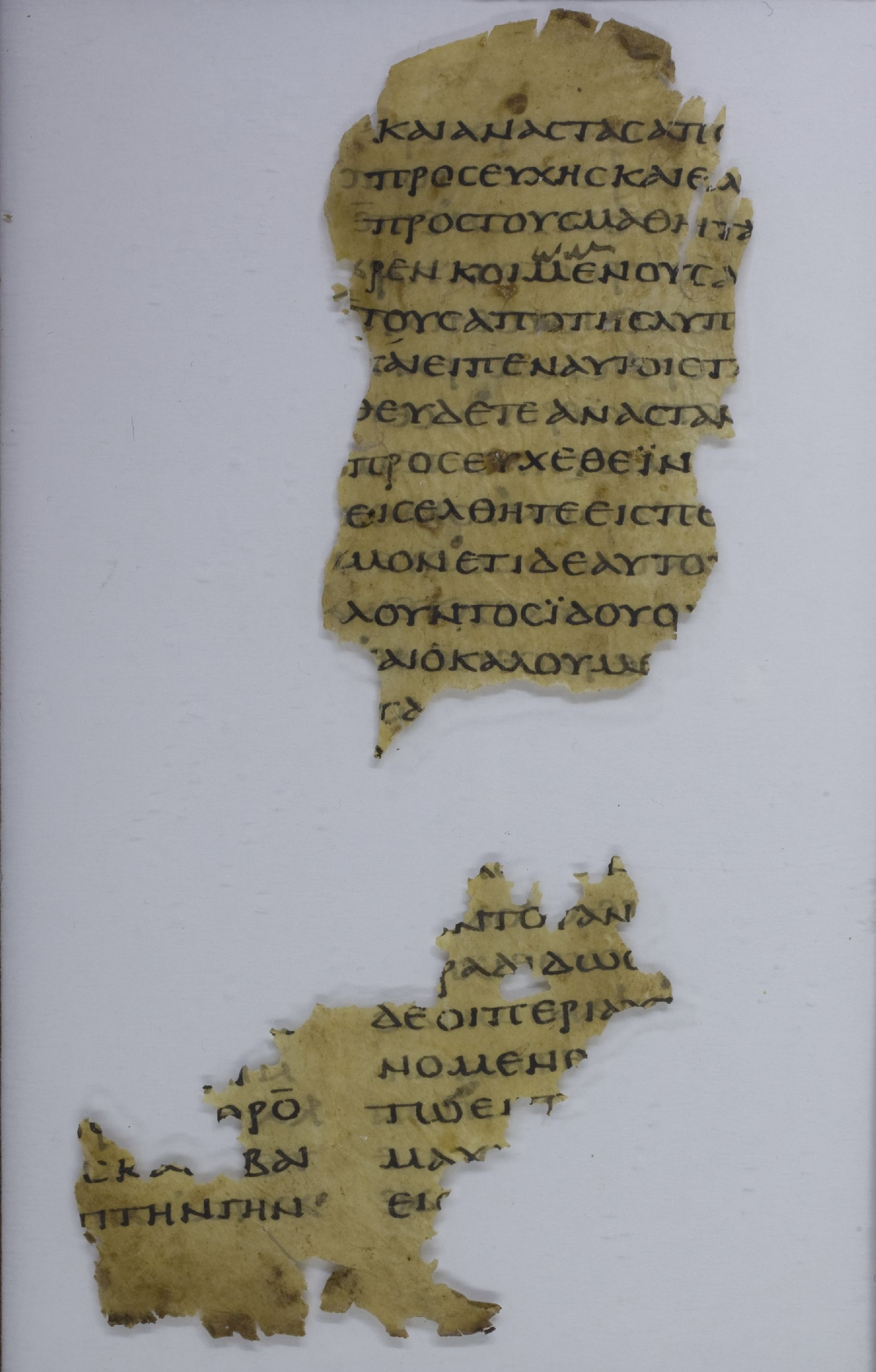
- Luke 22:44-50 on fragments a and b (recto) of the codex 0171, written about AD 300
- Book: Gospel of Luke
- Category: Gospel
- Christian Bible part: New Testament
- Order in the Christian part: 3

Luke 22 is the twenty-second chapter of the Gospel of Luke in the New Testament of the Christian Bible. It commences in the days just before the Passover or Feast of Unleavened Bread, and records the plot to kill Jesus Christ; the institution of the Lord's Supper; the arrest of Jesus; and his trial before the Sanhedrin.

Early Christian tradition generally considers that Luke the Evangelist composed this Gospel as well as the Acts of the Apostles. Critical opinion on the tradition was evenly divided at the end of the 20th century. This chapter initiates this gospel's passion narrative, which continues into chapter 23: while the apocalyptic discourse in Luke 21 "bases all its thought upon the reality of the Kingdom", it also "leads directly into the passion narrative, [which] shows how it was established".

== Text ==
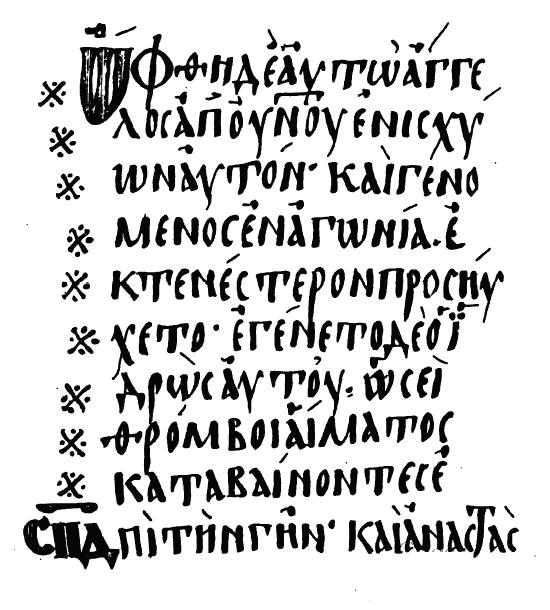
Luke 22:43–44 in Codex Vaticanus 354, AD 949

The original text was written in Koine Greek. This chapter is divided into 71 verses. It is the second longest chapter in the gospel in terms of number of verses. Some early manuscripts containing the text of this chapter are:

- Papyrus 75 (175–225)
- Papyrus 69 (3rd century; extant verses 41, 45–48, 58–61)
- Uncial 0171 (~300; extant verses 44–50, 52–56, 61, 63–64)
- Codex Vaticanus (325–350)
- Codex Sinaiticus (330–360)
- Codex Bezae (~400)
- Codex Washingtonianus (~400)
- Codex Alexandrinus (400–440)
- Codex Ephraemi Rescriptus (~450; extant verses 1–18).

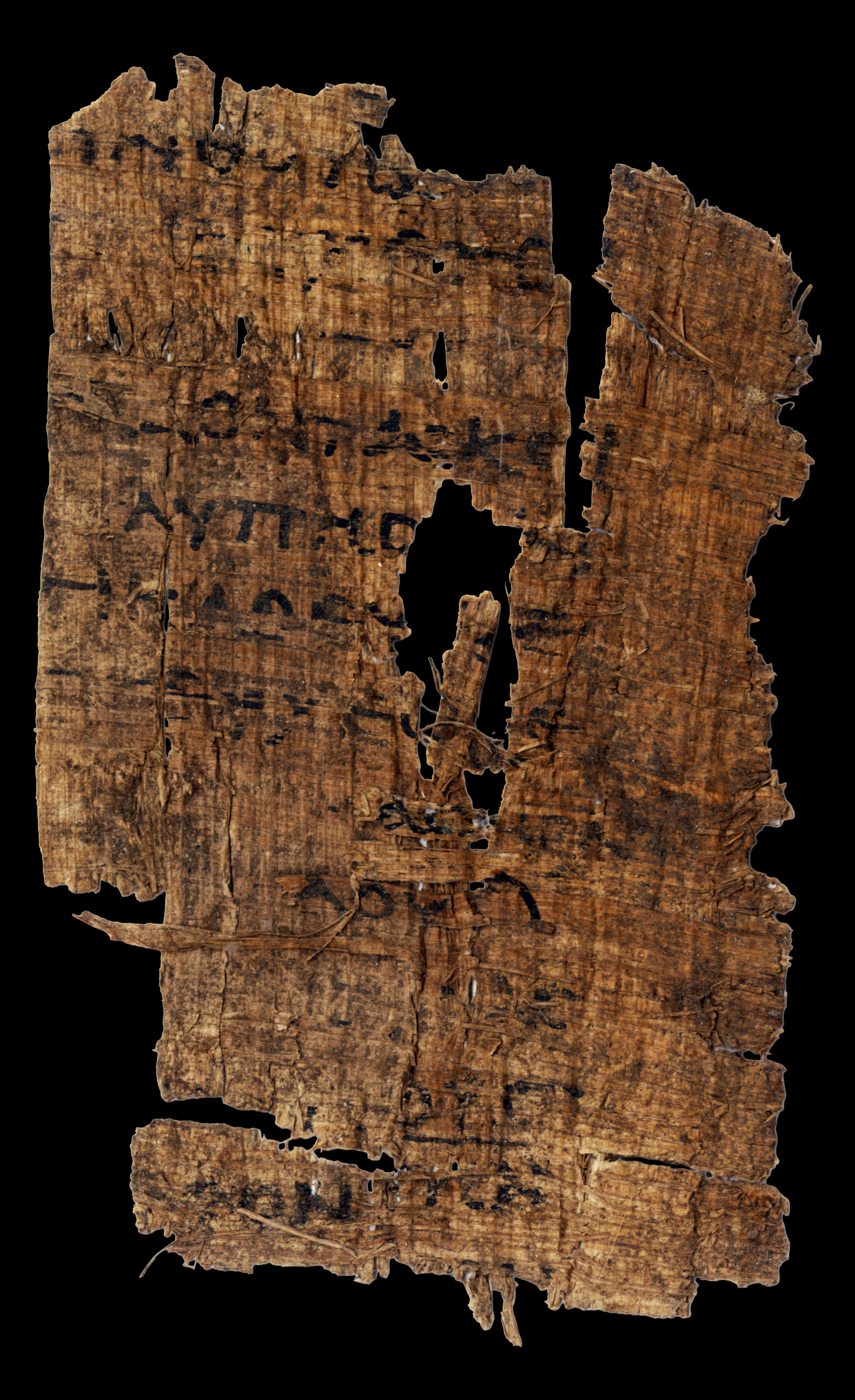
Luke 22: 41,45–48 on recto side of Papyrus 69, 3rd century

== The chief priests and the scribes deal with Judas (verses 1–6) ==
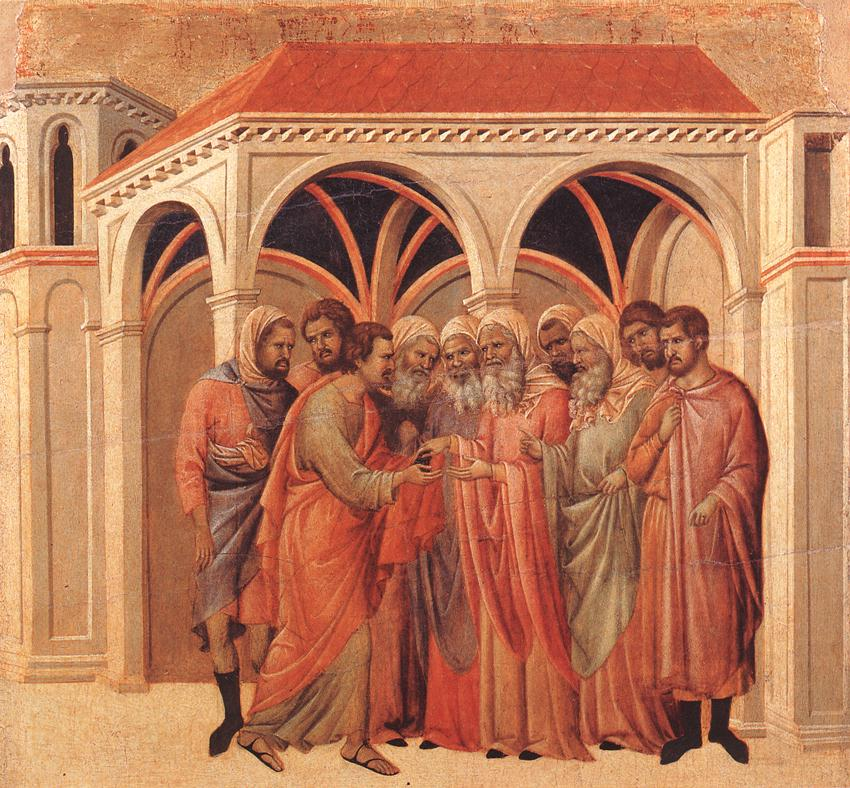
Judas making a bargain with the priests, depicted by Duccio, early 14th century

Luke 22:1–6 describes the chief priests and scribes' plot to kill Jesus in collaboration with Judas Iscariot. This scene is also depicted in Mark 14:1–2, 10–11 and Matthew 26:1–5, 14–16. Henry Alford notes that Matthew's account is the more complete and refers to Luke's account as "a mere compendium of what took place". Luke's wording emphasises that Judas sought to betray Jesus "when no crowd was present", reflecting the chief priests' and scribes' fear that they could not openly arrest Jesus because of his popular support. John 11:45–57 also records the plot to kill Jesus.

=== Verse 1 ===
Now the Festival of Unleavened Bread, called the Passover, was approaching.

This little explanation, "called the Passover", "shows most clearly that St Luke is writing mainly for Gentiles".

=== Verse 2 ===
And the chief priests and the scribes sought how they might kill Him, for they feared the people.

Scottish Free Church minister William Robertson Nicoll calls Jesus' popularity among the people "very embarrassing", while the writer Frederic Farrar considers it "humiliating" for them.

=== Verse 3 ===
Then Satan entered Judas, surnamed Iscariot, who was numbered among the twelve.

Luke alone of the synoptic writers sets the earthly events of the passion in the context of an eschatological battle with Satan. Nicoll suggests that his readers should compare this verse with John 13:2: the devil had already put it into the heart of Judas Iscariot, observing that "Luke's statement is stronger even than John's, suggesting a literal possession".

== The passover meal (verses 7–13) ==
These verses describe how Jesus sent Peter and John to prepare "a furnished upper room" (verse 12) for their taking of a Passover meal (which would be the Last Supper). This preparation is also depicted in Mark 14:12–16 and Matthew 26:17–25. Luke's is the only account which names the apostles (verse 8: cf. subsequent pairings of Peter and John in Acts 3:1-11, 4:1 and elsewhere). and the only narrative in which Jesus takes the initiative in arranging the meal: in Matthew and Mark, the disciples raise the subject.

== The farewell address (verses 14-38) ==
Luke 22:14–38 has been described as "Jesus' farewell address", modeled after other farewell addresses in the Greco-Roman and biblical traditions.

=== Verse 14 ===
When the hour had come, He sat down, and the twelve apostles with Him.

The word δώδεκα (dōdeka, meaning "twelve") does not appear in some ancient manuscripts, and some critical editors omit it. Protestant divine Heinrich Meyer suggests "it was written in the margin in agreement with the parallels", before being adopted into some texts. Conversely in Luke 9:1 the word δώδεκα consistently appears, but some manuscripts also add μαθητὰς αὐτοῦ (mathētas autou, 'his disciples').

Coat of Arms of Rt Rev Marcus Stock, Bishop of Leeds, quoting words from Luke 22:15

=== Verse 15 ===
Then He said to them, "With fervent desire I have desired to eat this Passover with you before I suffer.
καὶ εἶπεν πρὸς αὐτούς· Ἐπιθυμίᾳ ἐπεθύμησα τοῦτο τὸ πάσχα φαγεῖν μεθ’ ὑμῶν πρὸ τοῦ με παθεῖν·

Jesus declares to his apostles that "with fervent desire" (Greek: επιθυμια επεθυμησα, epithumia epithumesa) he has longed to celebrate this Passover with them. Pope Gregory X used these words (Latin: Desiderio desideravi) as his text at the Second Council of Lyons in 1274, in his sermon on the unity of the churches. These words would have been spoken in Aramaic. The construction reflects the Hebrew infinitive absolute which intensifies a verb. Why Jesus had such an earnest desire for this particular Passover is an open question: for Meyer, the expression suggests that his earnest wish was that "His passion should not begin before the Passover".

=== Verse 16 ===
For I tell you, I will not eat it again until it finds fulfillment in the kingdom of God.
λέγω γὰρ ὑμῖν ὅτι οὐ μὴ φάγω αὐτὸ ἕως ὅτου πληρωθῇ ἐν τῇ βασιλείᾳ τοῦ θεοῦ.

The word "again" is not in the Greek, but implied, and similarly in verse 18:

For I tell you I will not drink again from the fruit of the vine until the kingdom of God comes.

David Robert Palmer suggests that "some copyists apparently felt obliged to add the Greek word οὐκέτι, (ouketi) to both clarify the meaning, and also to harmonize Luke with Mark 14:25, and perhaps also with Matthew 26:29, which says, 'from now on'." The Textus Receptus includes the word οὐκέτι in verse 16 but not verse 18.

=== Verse 38 ===
And they said, "Look, Lord, here are two swords." And he said to them, "It is enough."

== The unfolding passion narrative (verses 39-71) ==
=== Verses 40–42 ===
Pray that you will not fall into temptation (New International Version, verse 40)
Not my will, but yours, be done (New King James Version, verse 42)

The words reflect Jesus' previous instructions to his disciples on how to pray (the Lord's Prayer, Luke 11:2–4), although the words "thy will be done, on earth as it is in heaven" do not appear in the earliest-known versions of Luke's Lord's Prayer. The Pulpit Commentary suggests that "the temptation in question was the grave sin of moral cowardice into which so soon the disciples fell".

=== Verses 43–44 ===
Then an angel appeared to Him from heaven, strengthening Him. And being in agony, He prayed more earnestly. Then His sweat became like great drops of blood falling down to the ground.

The authenticity of Luke 22:43–44 has been disputed by scholars since the second half of the 19th century. The verses are placed in double brackets in modern editions of the Greek text, and listed in a footnote in the Revised Standard Version.

=== Verse 45 ===
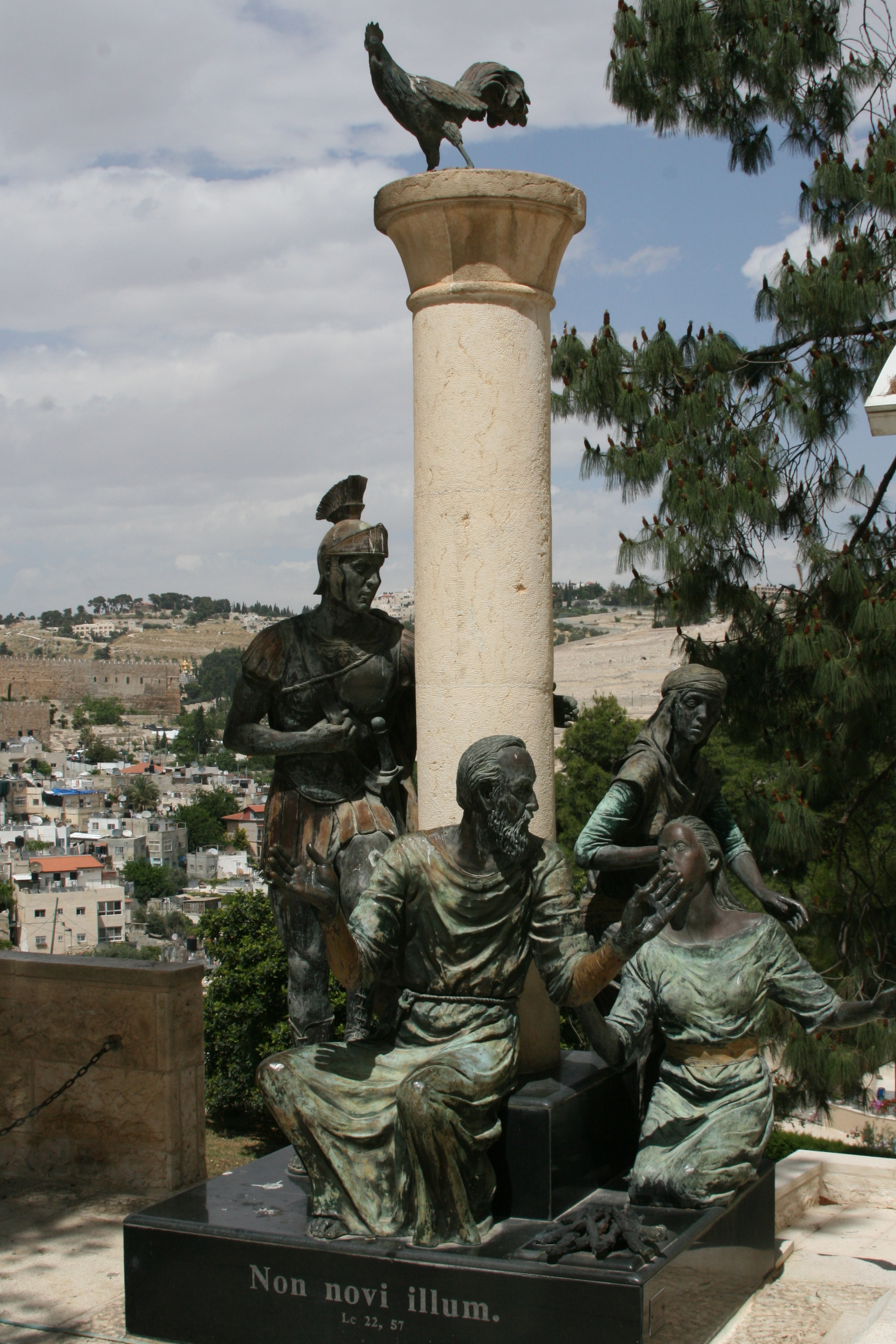
Non novi illum, "I do not know him" (Luke 22:57), Church of St. Peter in Gallicantu, in Jerusalem

When He rose up from prayer, and had come to His disciples, He found them sleeping from sorrow.

Luke adds "from sorrow", words which do not appear in the accounts of Matthew or Mark.

=== Verses 50–51 ===
^{50} And one of them smote the servant of the high priest, and cut off his right ear. And Jesus answered and said, Suffer ye thus far. And he touched his ear, and healed him.

Luke, like John, specifically notes that it was the servant's right ear which was removed. The exact meaning of Jesus' words, Suffer ye thus far, or No more of this! in the New International Version, "has been much debated". Alford treats them as directed to the multitude or specifically to Jesus' captors, meaning "allow me to touch the ear of the wounded person"; Nicoll suggests alternatively that they could have been directed to the disciples: "let them apprehend me", or "no more use of weapons".

=== Verse 70 ===
εἶπαν δὲ πάντες Σὺ οὖν εἶ ὁ Υἱὸς τοῦ Θεοῦ; ὁ δὲ πρὸς αὐτοὺς ἔφη Ὑμεῖς λέγετε ὅτι ἐγώ εἰμι.
Eipan de pantes, "Su oun ei ho Huios tou Theou?"; ho de pros autous ephē, "Humeis legete hoti egō eimi."

All of them asked, "Are you, then, the Son of God?"
He said to them, "You say that I am". (New Revised Standard Version)

The New King James Version adds "rightly":

"You rightly say that I am".

Similarly, J. B. Phillips translates as:

"You are right; I am", Jesus told them.

The Pulpit Commentary describes the style here as rabbinic: "by such an answer, the one interrogated accepts as his own affirmation the question put to him in its entirety."

=== Verse 71 ===
And they said, "What further testimony do we need? For we have heard it ourselves from His own mouth".

We have heard it ourselves that he "gives Himself out to be the Messiah". The chapter ends with the anticipated rejection of Jesus' self-witness and his resulting condemnation.

== See also ==
- Gethsemane
- Hematidrosis
- Holy Week
- Jerusalem
- Last Supper
- Ministry of Jesus
- Sanhedrin
- Other related Bible parts: Psalm 41, Matthew 26, Mark 14, John 18, 1 Corinthians 11

Preceded by Luke 21	Chapters of the Bible; Gospel of Luke	Succeeded by Luke 23
