= Robert Bowyer =

British miniature painter and publisher

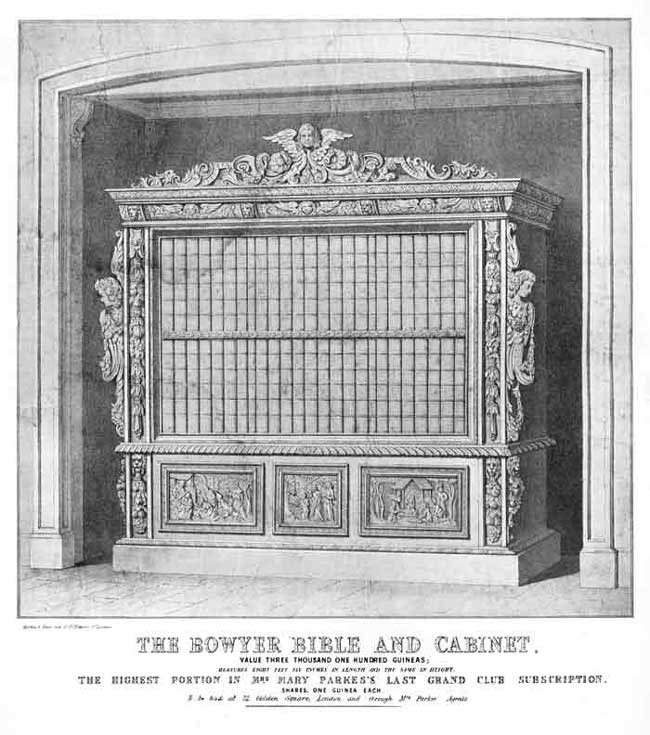
The "Bowyer Bible"

Robert Bowyer (/ˈboʊjər/; bap. 18 June 1758 – 4 June 1834) was a British miniature painter and publisher.

Bowyer was born in Portsmouth to Amos and Betty Ann Bowyer and baptized on 18 June 1758. His first job was as a clerk to a merchant in Portsmouth and then London. Two different accounts of his career shift survive. The first claims that he had decided to voyage to America, and before leaving wanted to obtain a portrait of himself for his fiancée, Mary Shoveller. Unable to afford to commission one, he painted one himself and eventually gave up the idea of going to America and became a miniaturist. The second claims that he was simply looking for a job and decided to paint. On 14 July 1777, Bowyer married Shoveller; the couple had one daughter.

Bowyer probably began to train with the miniature painter John Smart in the late 1770s and exhibited his first works at the Society of Artists in 1782 and at the Royal Academy in 1783. Bowyer had a successful career, painting the Duke of Rutland, the Marchioness of Salisbury, and Lord Nelson. On 4 March 1789 Bowyer was appointed Miniature Painter in Ordinary to the King, following the death of Jeremiah Meyer.

In the 1790s, Bowyer became a print publisher, starting with his own works. His two major endeavors were an illustrated edition of the Bible and David Hume's The History of England. Bowyer's Bible, begun in 1791 and finished in 1795, included 32 engravings by James Fittler after Old Master paintings. Bowyer also bought prints in France that he incorporated into a later edition known as "Bowyer's Bible"; he had an agent purchase even more during the Napoleonic Wars. These were added to Thomas Macklin's illustrated edition of the Bible, extending it to 45 volumes.

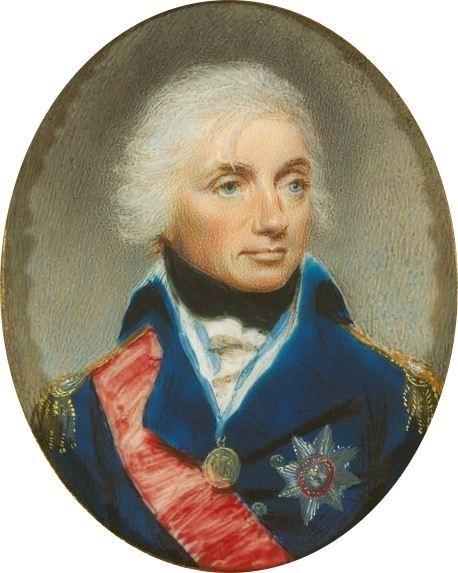
A miniature portrait of Lord Nelson by Bowyer (c. 1800)

Bowyer displayed the paintings he commissioned for Hume's work in a "Historic Gallery", sited in the Schomberg House building at 82 Pall Mall. The idea of placing the original pictures for the illustrated edition on display followed the examples of the Boydell Shakespeare Gallery, Thomas Macklin's Gallery of the Poets, and Henry Fuseli's Milton Gallery, all of which operated in Pall Mall at around the same time. Benjamin West and others contributed a total of 60 works to the Historic Gallery. By 1806, Bowyer had printed five folios, covering the years up to 1688, but high costs then prevented him from completing the work. Bowyer lost as much as £30,000 on the project and in 1805, to recoup some of these costs, he followed John Boydell's route in applying to Parliament for permission to hold a lottery for the gallery contents. Even after receiving approval for the lottery, it took Bowyer a further year to ensure that two paintings by Robert Smirke and 18 engravings were completed and the sale could proceed.

Due to his relationship with Smart, Bowyer also published a series of engravings regarding India. In 1794, for example, he published Picturesque Views, with a Descriptive History of the Country of Tipoo Sultan after drawings by Robert Home and in 1797 Oriental Scenery: Twenty-Four Views in Hindoostan after drawings by Thomas Daniell.

In 1796, the Bowyers' only daughter died at 18 and Robert wrote to Warren Hastings that he feared his wife might die as well. Three years later, however, the couple adopted Catherine Andras an orphaned wax modeller from Bristol.

During the Peace of Amiens, the Bowyers and Andras went to Paris as members of the Baptist Missionary Society and helped form the French Evangelical Society. Bowyer became increasingly active in religious causes later in his life, establishing a Sunday School, for example. He even bought a public house, demolished it, and built a chapel in its place near his place of business. In addition to religious activities, Bowyer turned back to miniature portrait painting at the end of his life. George IV and others sat for him.

Bowyer was witness to the will of William Singleton Folgham, proved 26 August 1825, giving his address as Byfleet Lodge, Surrey.

Bowyer's last years were plagued by financial difficulties and his home suffered a significant fire. He died on 4 June 1834. Mary Parkes, a maid and shop assistant, inherited the business.

== Gallery ==
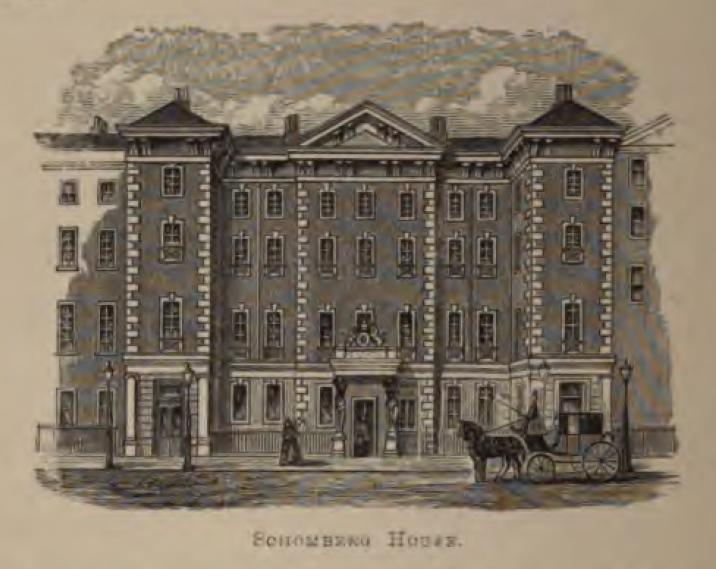
Schomberg House, at 82 Pall Mall, where Bowyer opened his Historic Gallery in the 1790s.

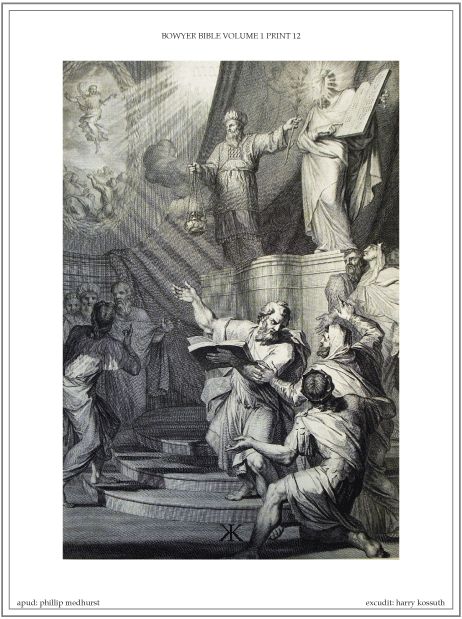
One of 6,330 prints in the 45 volumes of the Bowyer Bible in Bolton Museum, England

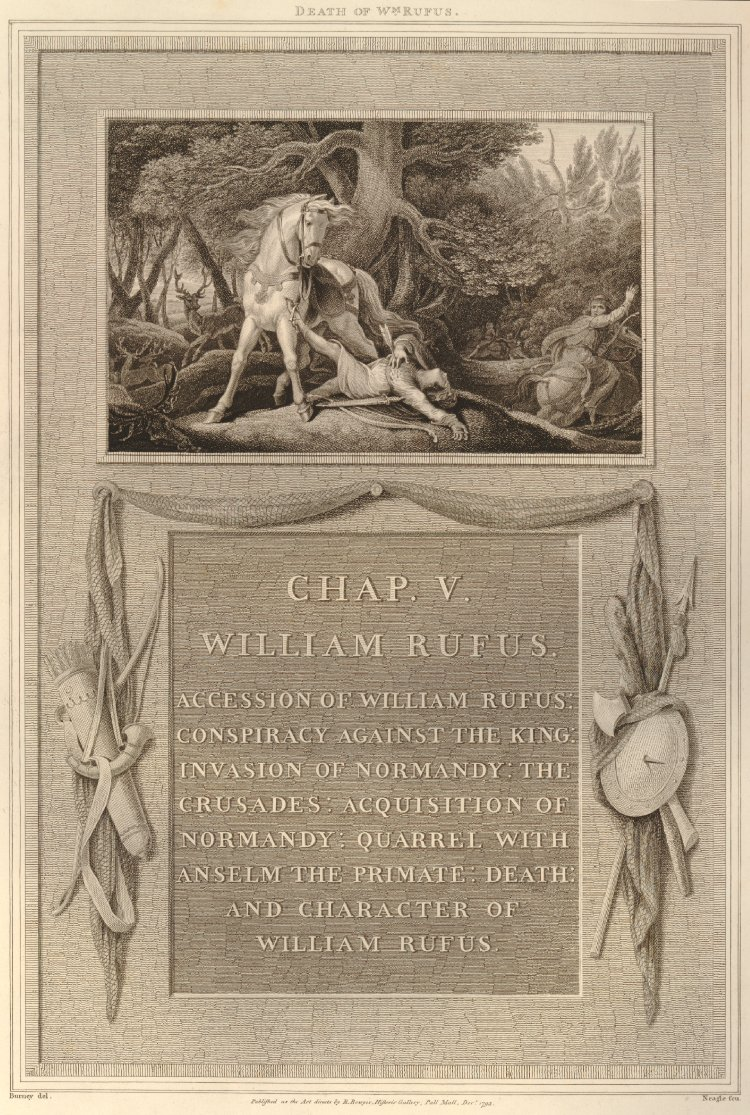
"Death of William Rufus", illustration accompanying Chapter V in Bowyer's 1793 printing of David Hume's The History of England

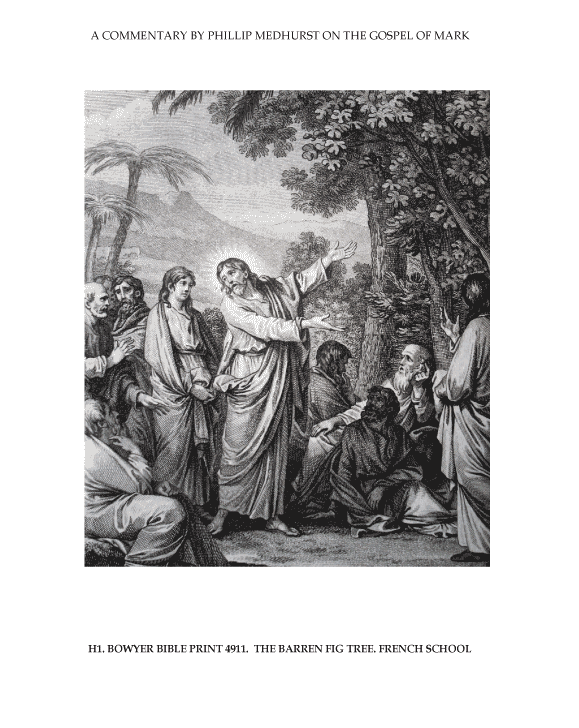
Parable of the barren fig tree
