= Figs in the Bible =

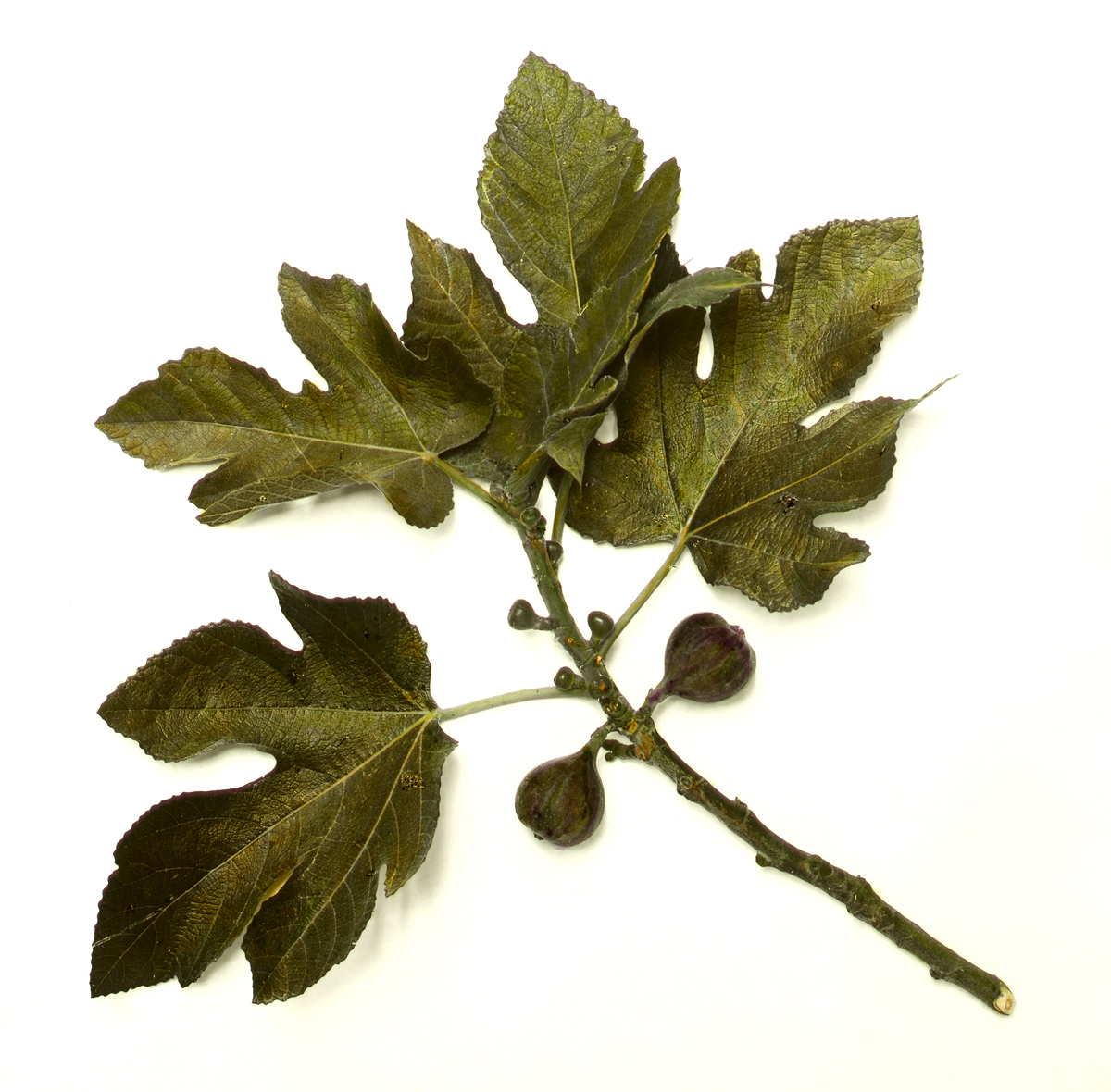
Common fig branch, showing leaves and fruit in various stages

Figs in the Bible include references to both the tree and its fruit in the Tanakh and the New Testament, which are sometimes symbolic.

== Hebrew Bible ==
The fig tree is the third tree to be mentioned by name in the Hebrew Bible. The first is the Tree of life and the second is the Tree of the knowledge of good and evil. Adam and Eve used the leaves of the fig tree to sew garments for themselves after they ate the "fruit of the Tree of knowledge", when they realized that they were naked.

In Deuteronomy, the Promised Land is described as "a land of wheat and barley, of vines and fig trees and pomegranates, a land of olive oil and honey; a land where you will eat food without scarcity, in which you will not lack anything;" During Solomon's reign Judah and Israel, from Dan to Beersheba, lived in safety, each man "under his own vine and fig tree", an indicator of national wealth and prosperity. 2 Kings states that Hezekiah rebelled against the King of Assyria, of whom he had become a vassal. In response, the Assyrian commander attempted to sway the army of Jerusalem by offering deserters each his own vine and fig tree.

Proverbs 27:18 likens tending a fig tree to looking after one's master. There was a fig tree in the garden of the Song of Solomon, and in the year of love the tree formed its fruit early.

The fig tree and figs are featured in the Book of Jeremiah and mentioned briefly in the Book of Micah.

Another species of ficus, the Egyptian sycamore fig, is occasionally mentioned as well, for example in 1 Kings.

== New Testament ==
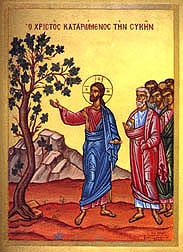
Byzantine icon of the cursing of the fig tree

The cursing of the barren fig tree is found in Matthew 24, Mark 13, Luke 21 as part of the Olivet Discourse. The fig tree could be understood as symbolic of Israel.

The parable of the barren fig tree is a parable of Jesus recorded in the Gospel of Luke 13:6-9. A vinekeeper holds out hope that a barren fig tree will bear fruit next year.

Mark 11 includes an account of Jesus cursing the fig tree:

The next day as they were leaving Bethany, Jesus was hungry. Seeing in the distance a fig tree in leaf, he went to find out if it had any fruit. When he reached it, he found nothing but leaves, because it was not the season for figs.

Then he said to the tree, "May no one ever eat fruit from you again." And his disciples heard him say it. On reaching Jerusalem, Jesus entered the temple area and began driving out those who were buying and selling there. He overturned the tables of the money changers and the benches of those selling doves, and would not allow anyone to carry merchandise through the temple courts. And as he taught them, he said, "Is it not written: "'My house will be called a house of prayer for all nations'? But you have made it 'a den of robbers.'" The chief priests and the teachers of the law heard this and began looking for a way to kill him, for they feared him, because the whole crowd was amazed at his teaching. When evening came, they went out of the city.

In the morning, as they went along, they saw the fig tree withered from the roots. Peter remembered and said to Jesus, "Rabbi, look! The fig tree you cursed has withered!" "Have faith in God," Jesus answered. "Truly I tell you, if anyone says to this mountain, 'Go, throw yourself into the sea,' and does not doubt in their heart but believes that what they say will happen, it will be done for them. Therefore I tell you, whatever you ask for in prayer, believe that you have received it, and it will be yours. And when you stand praying, if you hold anything against anyone, forgive them, so that your Father in heaven may forgive you your sins."

— New Revised Standard Version

A parallel is found in Matthew 21, but the fig tree withers immediately and is noticed at that time by the disciples.

In John's Gospel, when the apostle Nathanael first encounters Jesus and asks how Jesus knows him, Jesus answers that he has already seen Nathanael sitting under the fig tree (John 1).

== See also ==
- Fig § Cultural significance
- Fig leaf
- Seven Species
