= Cursing of the fig tree =

Incident reported in the Bible

The cursing of the fig tree is an incident reported in the Synoptic Gospels, presented in the Gospel of Mark and Gospel of Matthew as a miracle in connection with the entry of Jesus into Jerusalem, and in the Gospel of Luke as a parable. The image is taken from the Old Testament symbol of the fig tree representing Israel, and the cursing of the fig tree in Mark and Matthew and the parallel story in Luke are thus symbolically directed against the Jews who had not accepted Jesus as Messiah. The Gospel of John omits the incident entirely.

== Commentary ==
=== The symbol of the fig tree in Hebrew scripture ===
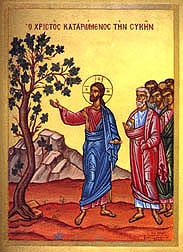
Byzantine-style icon of the cursing of the fig tree

In the Jewish scriptures, the fruit of a fig tree is used as a metaphor to describe the relationship of the people to God (Hosea 9:10, Jeremiah 24). In Jeremiah, the fig tree that bears no fruit is a symbol of sterility (Jeremiah 8:13). In Micah 4:4, the age of the Messiah is pictured as one in which each man would sit under his fig tree without fear. The sages of the Mishna and Talmud understood the land "flowing with milk and honey" as referring to the milk or sap of figs. The cursing of the fig tree in Mark and Matthew and the parallel story in Luke are thus symbolically directed against the Jews who did not accept Jesus as king. At first sight, the destruction of the fig tree does not seem to fit Jesus' behaviour elsewhere (and Bertrand Russell used the tale to dispute the greatness of Jesus), but the miracle stories are directed against property rather than people, and form a "prophetic act of judgement".

John McEvilly gives a Catholic interpretation in his gospel commentary, writing that the episode can be regarded as a prophetic parable, and that Jesus had previously performed all his miracles as proof of "His merciful benevolence", but now also he confirms the faith of his disciples, instead by displaying the rigours of his justice. In cursing the fig-tree, he shows "His justice on the sinners who bring forth not the expected fruits of grace." Since even though a person should only expect fruit from a tree in its season, God by contrast always has the right to expect from mankind the fruits of righteousness and piety. McEvilly further states that "in punishment of our sterility, God will strike us with still greater spiritual barrenness and decay."

The fruit of the Tree of the Knowledge of Good and Evil was also traditionally held to be a fig tree, given the proximate reference in the Book of Genesis (chapter 3 verse 7) to Adam and Eve sewing together fig leaves to make clothes. Some commentators have used this connection to explain Jesus' cursing of the fig tree as Jesus attacking that which brought sin and death into the world, and such just days before the Crucifixion when Jesus conquers death, cf. 1 Corinthians 15.

=== Gospel of Mark 11:12–25 ===
Most scholars believe that the Gospel of Mark was the first gospel and was used as a source by the authors of Matthew and Luke. Mark uses the cursing of the barren fig tree to bracket and comment on the story of the Jewish temple: Jesus and his disciples are on their way to Jerusalem when Jesus curses a fig tree because it bears no fruit; in Jerusalem he drives the money-changers from the temple; and the next morning the disciples find that the fig tree has withered and died, with the implied message that the temple is cursed and will wither because, like the fig tree, it failed to produce the fruit of righteousness. The episode concludes with a discourse on the power of prayer, leading some scholars to interpret this, rather than the eschatological aspect, as its primary motif, but at Mark 13:28 Mark has Jesus again use the image of the fig tree to make plain that Jerusalem will fall and the Jewish nation be brought to an end before their generation passes away.

=== Gospel of Matthew 21:18–22 ===
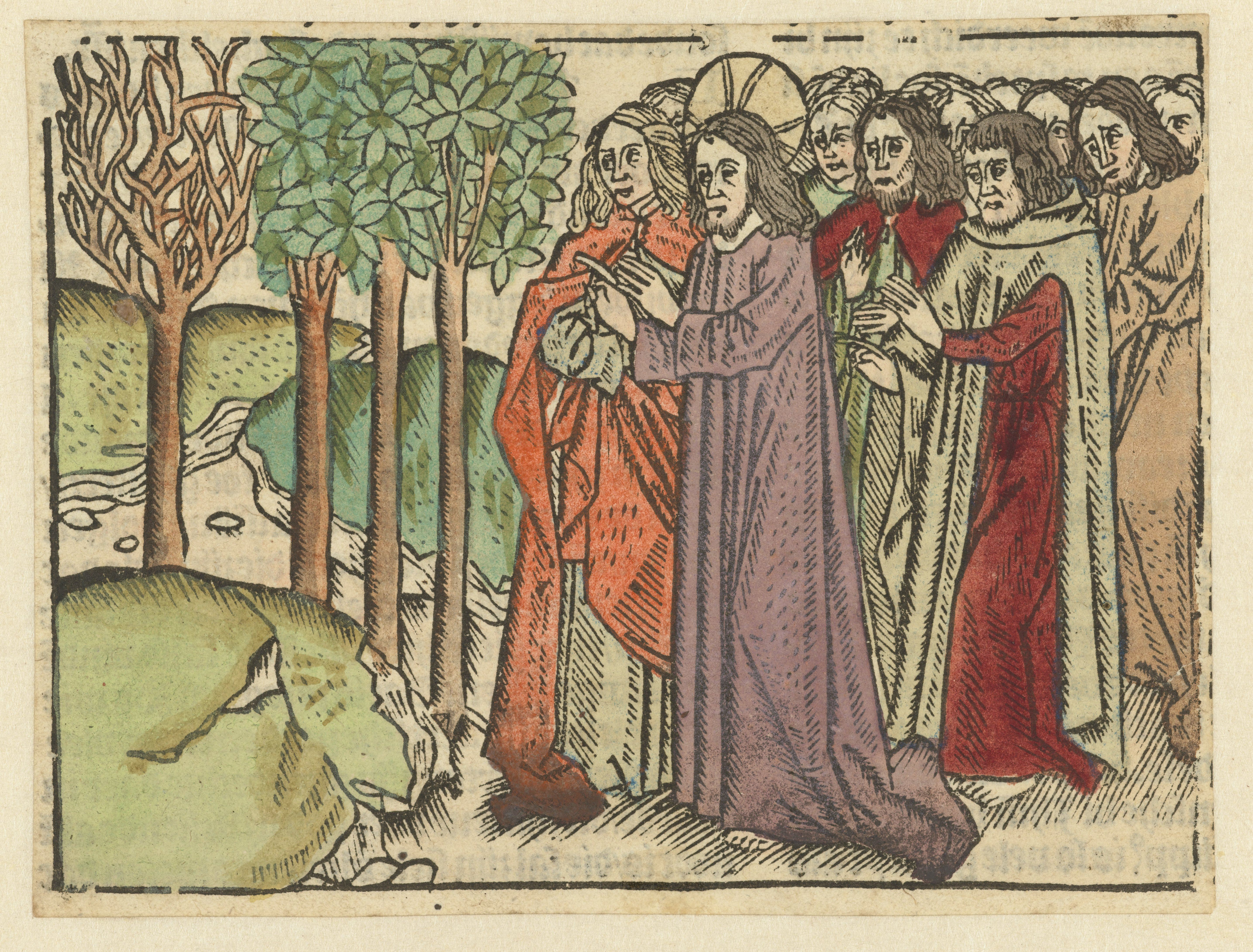
Christ cursing the fig-tree (1485)

Matthew compresses Mark's divided account into a single story. Here the fig tree withers immediately after the curse is pronounced, driving the narrative forward to Jesus' encounter with the Jewish priesthood and his curse against them and the temple. Jesus responds to the disciples' expressions of wonder with a brief discourse on faith and prayer, and while this makes it less clear that the dead fig tree is related to the fate of the temple, in Matthew 24:32–35 the author follows Mark closely in presenting the "lesson" (in Greek, parabole) of the budding tree as a sign of the certain coming of the Son of Man.

=== Gospel of Luke 13:6–9 ===
Luke replaces the miracle with the parable of the barren fig tree, probably originating from the same body of tradition that lies behind Mark. Jesus and the disciples are traveling to Jerusalem when they hear of the deaths of Galileans. Jesus gives the events a prophetic interpretation through a parable: a man planted a fig tree expecting it to bear fruit, but despite his visits it remained barren; the owner's patience wore thin, but the gardener pleaded for a little more time; the owner agrees, but the question of whether the tree would bear fruit, i.e. acts that manifest the Kingdom of God, is left hanging. Luke has Jesus end his story with a warning that if the followers do not repent they will perish.

=== Infancy Gospel of Thomas ===
A very different story appears in the non-canonical, Gnostic Infancy Gospel of Thomas, but attributes a similar quotation to Jesus: "behold, now also thou shalt be withered like a tree, and shalt not bear leaves, neither root, nor fruit." (III:2).

== Other ==
Counter-protestors of the Westboro Baptist Church have been known to display humorous signs to mock the group; in particular, the phrase "God hates figs" is commonly used, in reference to Bible stories such as Jesus cursing the fig tree.

== See also ==
- Antisemitism and the New Testament
- Figs in the Bible
- Life of Jesus in the New Testament
- Parable of the budding fig tree
- Parable of the barren fig tree
