= Catherine Andras =

English sculptor (1775–1860)

- Born: 1775; Bristol, United Kingdom
- Died: 1860 (aged 84–85)
- Known for: Sculpture, Wax modeller
- Awards: Royal Society of Arts, Greater Silver Pallet (1801)

Catherine Andras (1775–1860) was an English sculptor best known for her wax models. She was active as an artist until 1855 and died in London in 1860.

== Life ==
Andras was born in Bristol and started creating wax models while working in a toy shop. Orphaned at an early age, she was later adopted by miniature painter, Robert Bowyer, and his wife in 1799. She moved to London and worked at the Historical Gallery, 87 Pall Mall, before moving to Great Titchfield Street. She later returned to Pall Mall.

== Wax modelling work ==
Andras exhibited in London at the Royal Academy of Arts from 1799 to 1824. In 1802 was appointed Modeller in Wax to Queen Charlotte. She was awarded 'The Larger Silver Pallet' by the Society for the Encouragement of Arts, Manufactures and Commerce for her model of Princess Charlotte and a portrait of Lord Nelson. After Lord Nelson's death, with crowds of people visiting St. Paul's cathedral to visit his tomb, Westminster Abbey commissioned Andras to create a wax effigy for the church in an attempt to attract the crowds.

Works by Andras are also displayed in the British Museum, the National Gallery of Ireland and the Metropolitan Museum of Art.

=== Selected artworks ===
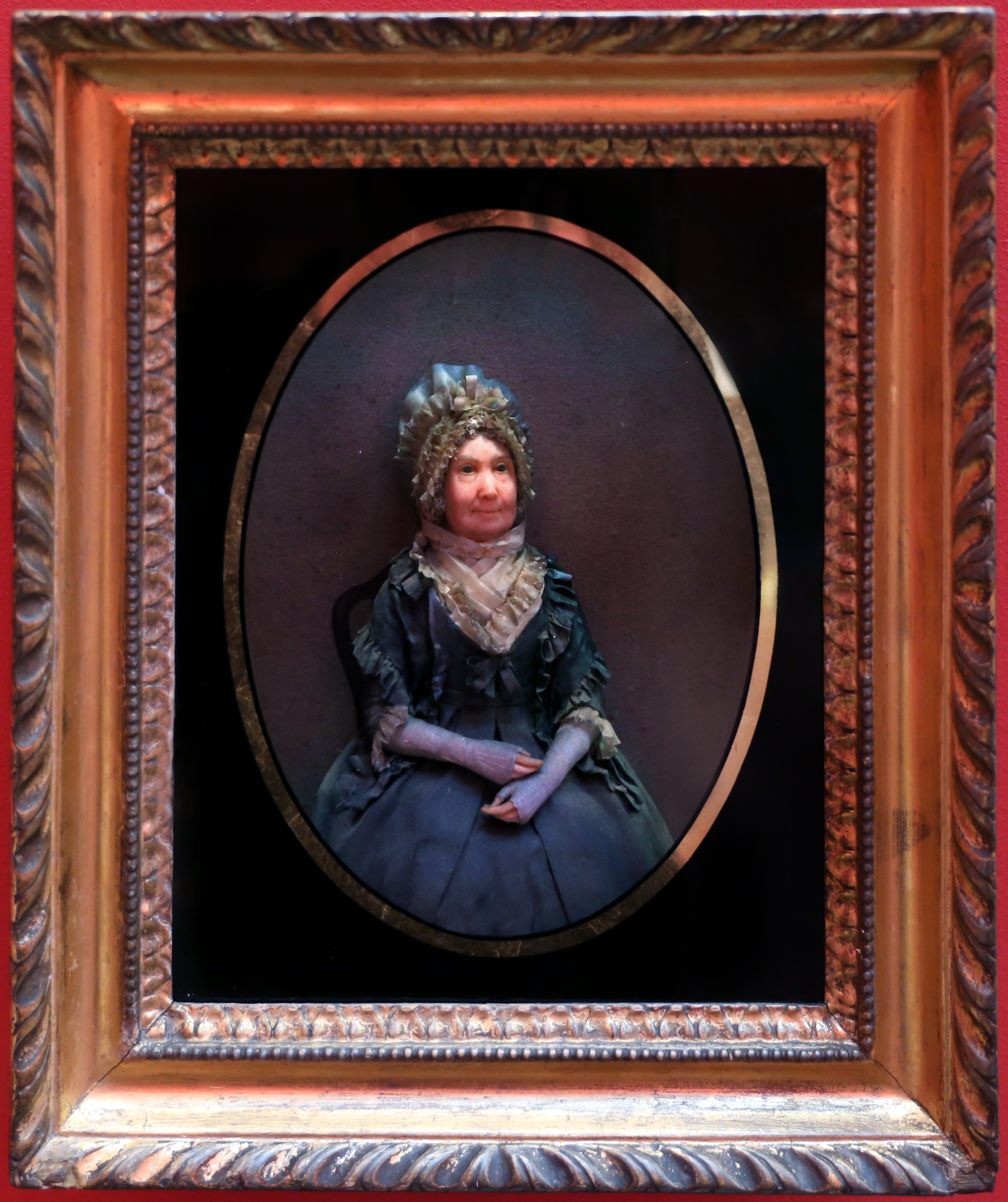
Rose Bruce (1728-1806), Widow of Revd Samuel Bruce (1799) in the National Gallery of Ireland

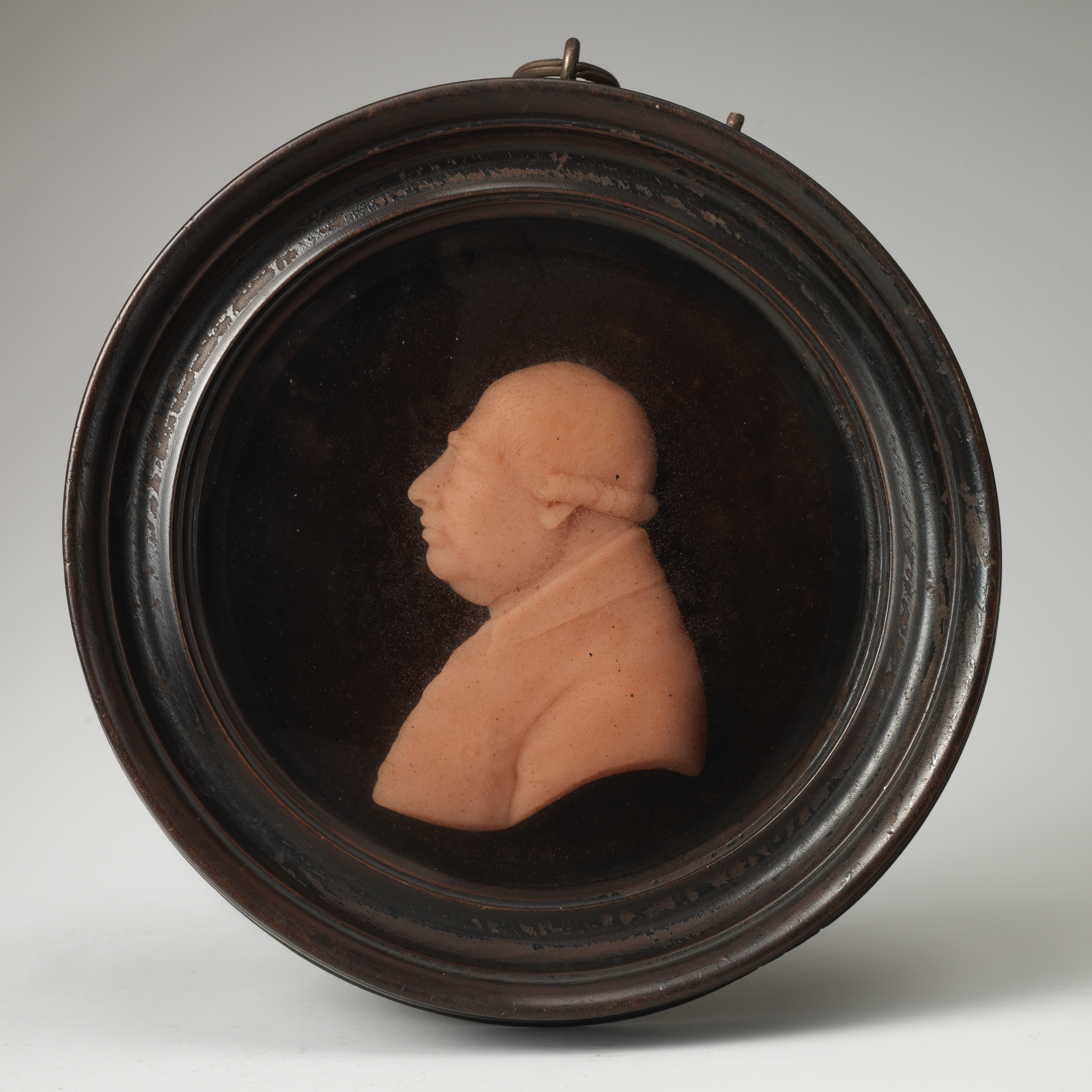
George III (1738–1820), King of England (1760–1820) in The Glenn Tilley Morse Collection, Bequest of Glenn Tilley Morse, 1950, Metropolitan Museum of Art
