= Matthew 25 =

- ← chapter 24 chapter 26 →
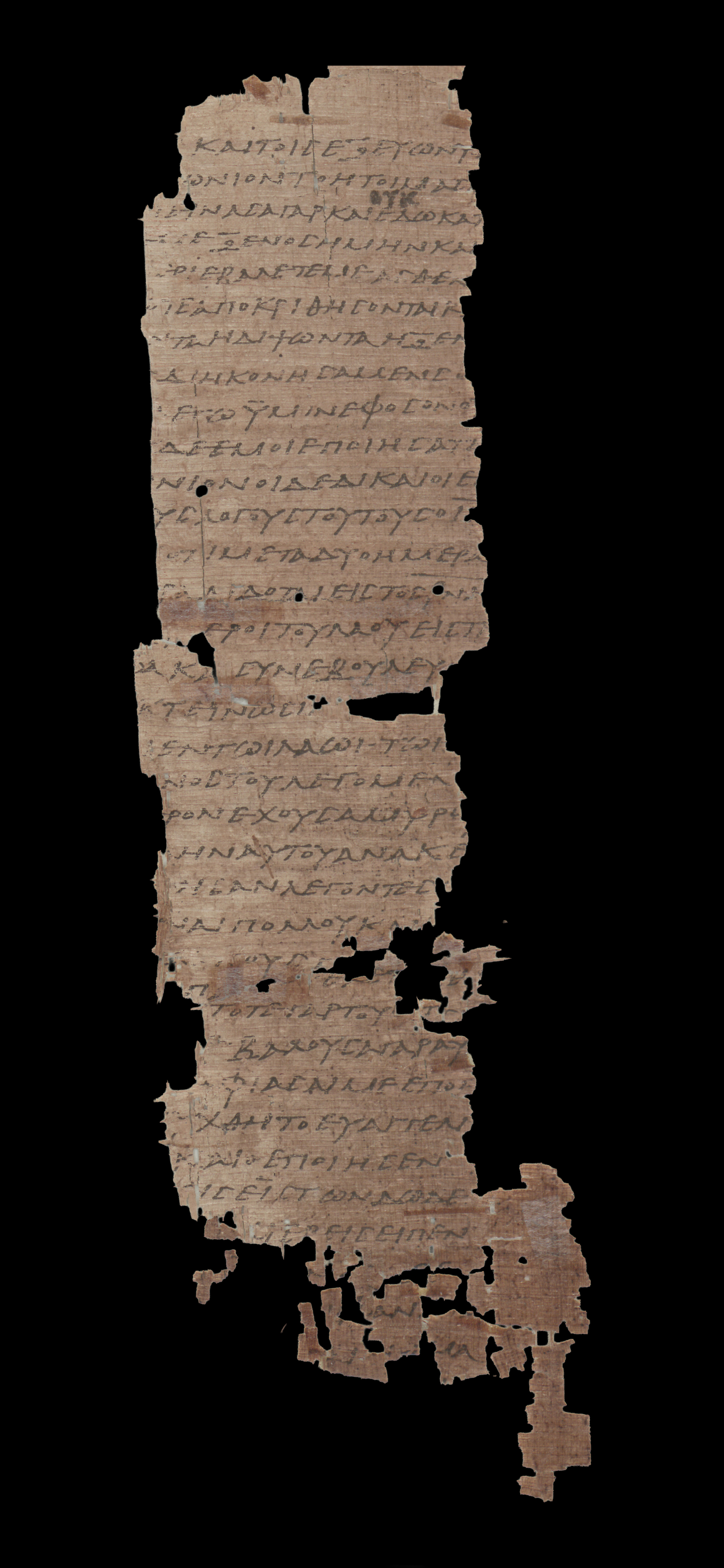
- Gospel of Matthew 25:41–26:10 on Papyrus 45, from c. AD 250
- Book: Gospel of Matthew
- Category: Gospel
- Christian Bible part: New Testament
- Order in the Christian part: 1

Matthew 25, the twenty-fifth chapter of the Gospel of Matthew, continues the Olivet Discourse or "Little Apocalypse" spoken by Jesus, also called the Eschatological Discourse, which started in Matthew 24.

In the Journal of Biblical Literature, American theologian Jason Hood wrote that Matthew 23, Matthew 24, and Matthew 25 form the gospel's fifth and final discourse. On his reading, these three chapters "uniquely infuse Jesus' distinctive teaching on discipleship, Christology, and judgment with the dramatic tension running throughout Matthew's plot".

== Text ==
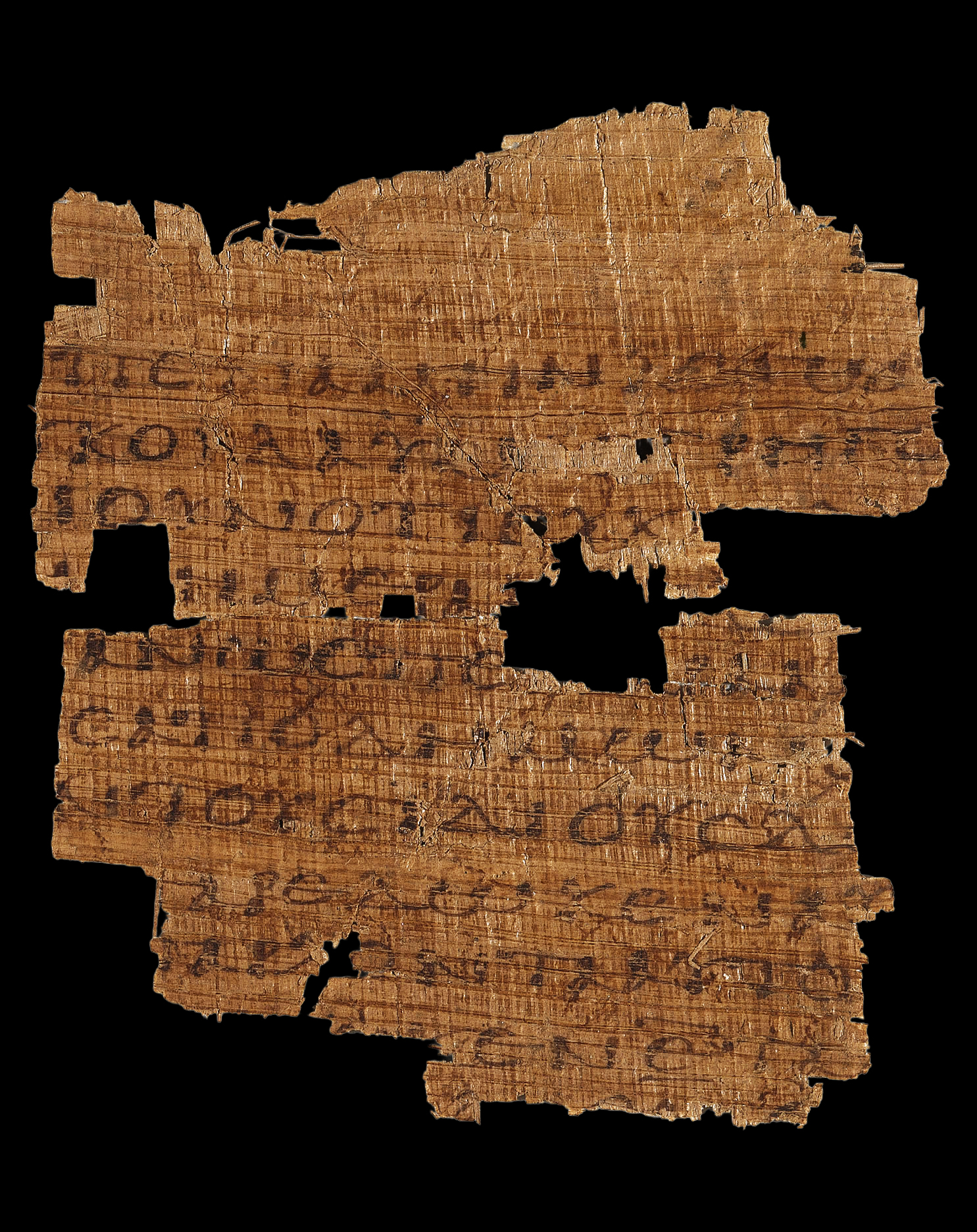
Matthew 25:12–15 on the recto side of Papyrus 35 from 3rd/4th century

The original text was written in Koine Greek. Some early manuscripts containing the text of this chapter are:

- Papyrus 45 (~AD 250; extant verses 41–46)
- Papyrus 35 (3rd/4th century; extant verses 12–15, 20–23)
- Codex Vaticanus (325–350)
- Codex Sinaiticus (330–360)
- Codex Bezae (~400)
- Codex Washingtonianus (~400)
- Codex Ephraemi Rescriptus (~450)
- Codex Purpureus Rossanensis (6th century)
- Codex Petropolitanus Purpureus (6th century; extant verses 7–34)
- Codex Sinopensis (6th century; extant verses 1–18)
- Papyrus 44 (6th/7th century; extant verses 8–10)

It is also found in quotations from Irenaeus (AD 180) in Adversus Haereses.

== Contents ==
This chapter has 46 verses. Pope Francis called this chapter "the 'protocol' by which we will be judged at the end of the world":

What is the protocol by which the judge will evaluate us? We find it in Chapter 25 of the Gospel of Matthew.

The chapter continues a discourse begun in Matthew 24:3, where the disciples come to Jesus to speak "privately". The Parable of the Ten Virgins (verses 1–13) and the Parable of the Talents (verses 14–30) are both unique to Matthew, although the latter has a corollary in Luke 19:11–27.

=== Verse 1 ===
Then shall the kingdom of heaven be likened unto ten virgins, which took their lamps, and went forth to meet the bridegroom.

Arthur Carr suggests reading this verse as "the condition of the Church at the End of the World shall be like the condition of the ten virgins".

=== Verse 14 ===
Again, it will be like a man going on a journey, who called his servants and entrusted his wealth to them. (New International Version)
For the kingdom of heaven is as a man travelling into a far country, who called his own servants, and delivered unto them his goods. (King James Version)

This verse begins a new parable, that of the talents, or minas. There is no reference to the "kingdom of heaven" in this verse in the Greek text, or elsewhere in the parable, but the words, which mirror verse 1, are added in the King James Version and some other English translations "for the sake of grammatical completeness".

=== Verses 31–46 ===
The final section (verses 31–46) is sometimes called The Sheep and the Goats or "The Judgment of the Nations". Though often called a "parable", it is not a story as such, but the portrayal of the Son of Man as a shepherd and the people under judgment as sheep or goats can be treated as "parabolic elements".

The narrative quotes Jesus teaching that all people will be assembled before him and "he will separate them one from another", with some who will "inherit the kingdom" and others who will go to "the eternal fire prepared for the devil and his angels". Jesus is said to have said that the basis of this separation is whether someone:

- Gave food to the hungry
- Gave drink to the thirsty
- Welcomed the stranger
- Clothed the naked
- Took care of the sick
- Took care of those in prison.

Hector Avalos compares these statements with The Book of the Dead, which dates to the New Kingdom of Egypt. In it, a specific set of actions are listed that are valued by the gods and by which people will be judged:

I have acted rightly in Egypt, I have not cursed a god..., I have done what people speak of, What the gods are pleased with..., I have given bread to the hungry, water to the thirsty, clothes to the naked, a ferryboat to the boatless, I have given divine offerings to the gods.

== Uses ==
=== Music ===
"Matthew 25:21" is a song on the American band The Mountain Goats' 2009 album The Life of the World to Come.

== See also ==
- Golden Rule
- Matthew 25: Ministries
- Mount of Olives
- Olivet Discourse
- Parables of Jesus
