= Mark 13 =

- ← chapter 12 chapter 14 →
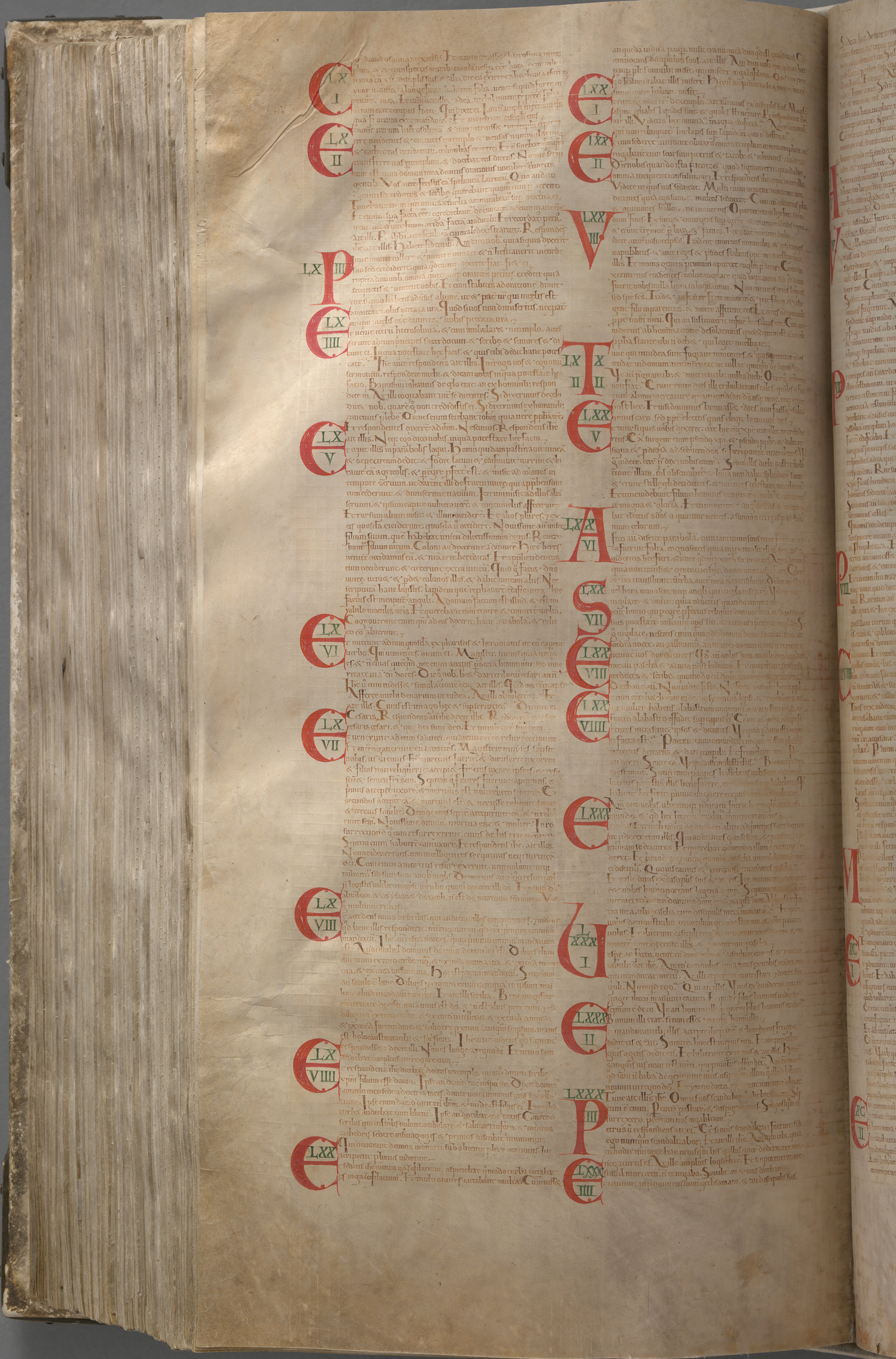
- The Latin text of Mark 11:10–14:32 in Codex Gigas (13th century)
- Book: Gospel of Mark
- Category: Gospel
- Christian Bible part: New Testament
- Order in the Christian part: 2

Mark 13 is the thirteenth chapter of the Gospel of Mark in the New Testament of the Christian Bible. It contains the "Markan Apocalypse": Jesus' predictions of the destruction of the Temple in Jerusalem and disaster for Judea, as well as Mark's version of Jesus' eschatological discourse. Theologian William Barclay described this chapter as "one of the most difficult chapters in the New Testament for a modern reader to understand".

== Text ==
The original text was written in Koine Greek. This chapter is divided into 37 verses.

=== Textual witnesses ===
Some early manuscripts containing the text of this chapter are:

- Codex Vaticanus (325-350; complete)
- Codex Sinaiticus (330-360; complete)
- Codex Bezae (~400; complete)
- Codex Alexandrinus (400-440; complete)
- Codex Ephraemi Rescriptus (~450; extant verses 20–37)

=== New Testament parallels ===
- Mark 13:1–8: Matthew 24:1–8; Luke 21:5–9
- Mark 13:9–13: Matthew 24:9–14; Luke 21:10–19
- Mark 13:14–23: Matthew 24:15–25; Luke 21:20–24
- Mark 13:24–27: Matthew 24:26–31; Luke 21:25–28
- Mark 13:28–31: Matthew 24:32–35; Luke 21:29–33
- Mark 13:32–37: Matthew 24:36–51; Luke 21:35–48

== The Temple's destruction (13:1–23) ==
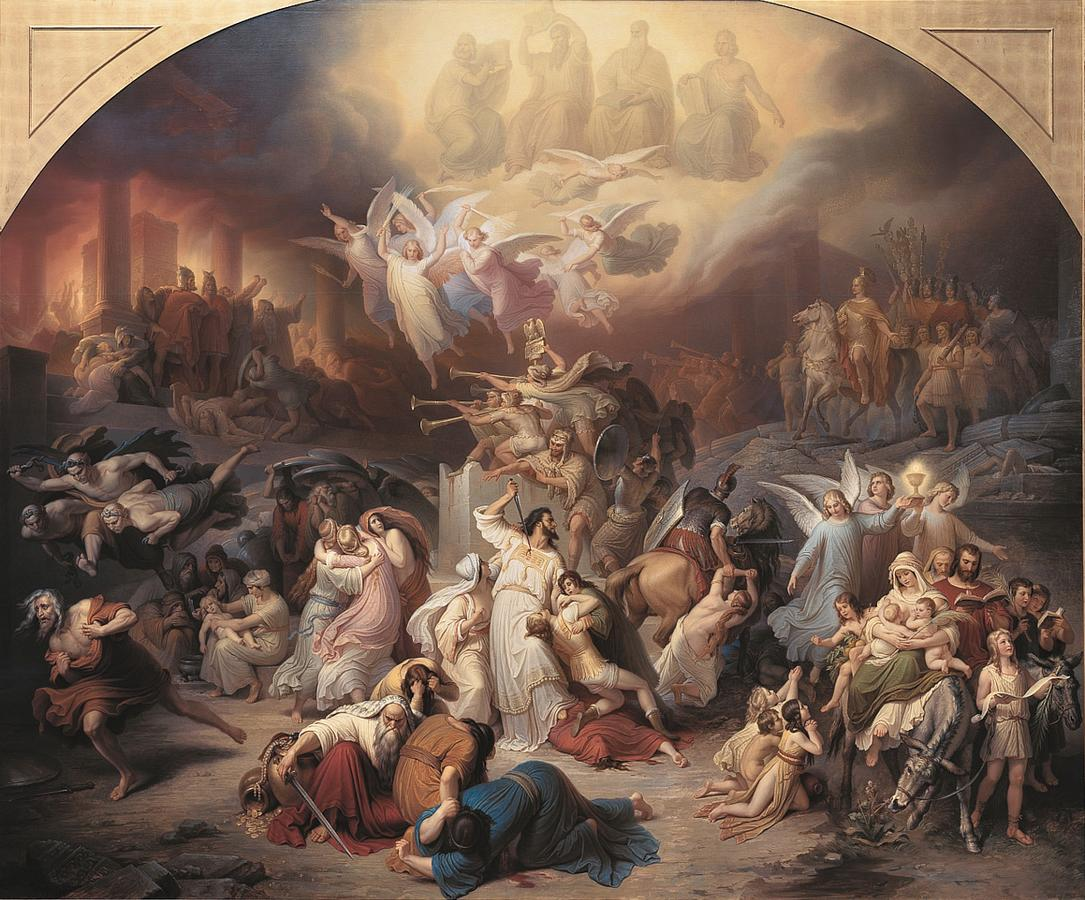
Titus Destroying Jerusalem by Wilhelm von Kaulbach (1846)

After his teachings in the previous chapter, all set in the Temple courts, Jesus finishes his teaching in the Second Temple for the day and leaves. On his way out of the Temple an unnamed disciple remarks how extensive the Temple (Herod's Temple) is. The buildings might have reached up to 150 feet (45.72 m) in height and they were adorned with gold, silver and other precious items. In Mark, the scale of the Temple is emphasised: the phrase "what manner of stones" (in the King James Version) is treated as referring to the size of the stones in the New International Version and the New Revised Standard Version. In Luke's gospel, the beauty of the stonework is highlighted.

"Do you see (all) these great buildings?" replies Jesus. The word "all" is added in the Vulgate (omnes), the Ethiopic version and the New International Version. Jesus acknowledges their greatness, but predicts that "not one stone here will be left on another; every one will be thrown down". This is the last reference made by Jesus to the Temple in Mark's narrative. Jesus seems to anticipate that it will be destroyed, although he does not say when or how.

Jesus then returns to the Mount of Olives. Mark recounts that Peter, James, John, and Andrew asked Jesus privately, as he was sitting opposite the Temple on the mountain, "Tell us, when will these things (plural) happen? And what will be the sign that they are all about to be fulfilled?" Henry Alford argues that the use of the plural, these things, "implies that they viewed the destruction of the temple as part of a great series of events, which had now by frequent prophecy become familiar to them". Some translations revert to the singular: when will this happen?, for example the New Living Translation.

Jesus replies, "beginning to tell them" (ἤρξατο λέγειν, ērxato legein):

=== Verses 5–8 ===
Take heed lest any man deceive you: For many shall come in my name, saying, I am Christ; and shall deceive many. And when ye shall hear of wars and rumours of wars, be ye not troubled: for such things must needs be; but the end shall not be yet. For nation shall rise against nation, and kingdom against kingdom: and there shall be earthquakes in divers places, and there shall be famines and troubles: these are the beginnings of sorrows. (5-8 KJV)

The "beginning of sorrows" is a traditional translation, used in the Geneva Bible and the King James Version. Its literal meaning, reflected in texts like the New Revised Standard Version, is "the beginning of birth pangs". It was the general belief that if the Messiah had arrived in Jerusalem, the final Messianic victory and the kingdom of God were close at hand. Jesus, however, seems to set up many additional things that will occur before his final triumph.

=== Verses 9-13 ===
Jesus then predicts that they will be harassed (beaten) by various councils and synagogues, rulers and kings; that they are to say whatever comes to mind, as it will be God speaking through them, and that Jesus' message will be given to every nation. Families will be torn apart, that "All men will hate you because of me, but he who stands firm to the end will be saved."

Matthew 10:17 and Acts 22:19 also make reference to beating or scourging taking place within synagogues.

=== Verses 14–23 ===
Jesus then predicts a disastrous event in Judea:

"When you see 'the abomination that causes desolation' standing where it does not belong — let the reader understand — then let those who are in Judea flee to the mountains. Let no one on the roof of his house go down or enter the house to take anything out. Let no one in the field go back to get his cloak. How dreadful it will be in those days for pregnant women and nursing mothers! Pray that this will not take place in winter, because those will be days of distress unequaled from the beginning, when God created the world, until now— and never to be equaled again. If the Lord had not cut short those days, no one would survive. But for the sake of the elect, whom he has chosen, he has shortened them. At that time if anyone says to you, 'Look, here is the Christ!' or, 'Look, there he is!' do not believe it. For false Christs and false prophets will appear and perform signs and miracles to deceive the elect—if that were possible. So be on your guard; I have told you everything ahead of time. (14-23 NIV)

The warnings about false Christs are thought by some scholars to be warnings against others claiming to be the messiah or Christian teachers who claimed to actually be the reincarnation of Jesus. Acts of the Apostles 5:36-37 contains a description given by Gamaliel about Theudas and Judas the Galilean, both also mentioned by Josephus, who also claimed to be leaders of new movements.

Mark inserts his own comments to the reader about the abomination, suggesting the phrase was some kind of code between him and his audience. It is a quote from the Book of Daniel where it appears in 9:27 as part of a prophecy that the book claims was given to the prophet Daniel by Gabriel during the Babylonian captivity about Jerusalem's future. An "Anointed One" would come, be "cut off", and then another people would come and destroy Jerusalem and set up the abomination in the Temple. 11:31 speaks of it in context of a great battle of Kings, and 12:11 uses it as part of Daniel's end time vision. Many modern scholars, who believe Daniel was pseudepigraphically written in the mid-2nd century BC, believe that these references really refer to the shrine to Zeus set up by Antiochus IV Epiphanes with a Pagan altar on the Altar of Holocausts in the Second Temple in 168 BC.

What exactly it meant to the Early Christians and Mark's audience is unknown, with some thinking it refers to Titus' destruction of the Temple, others that it might be a reference to Caligula's attempt to have a statue of himself put in the Temple. Others have seen the abomination as the Antichrist. It is unclear whether this refers to the Roman destruction of Jerusalem, but many Christians after that event certainly have seen it that way. More recently it has been suggested that the abomination in Mark is a reference to the crucifixion itself.

According to Mark, Jesus made this prediction years before the Temple was actually destroyed in 70. Acts 6:14 states that Stephen, the first Christian martyr (unless one counts Jesus), was falsely accused of claiming Jesus would destroy Israel and the Mosaic law before he was stoned to death, an event Acts claims Paul observed. Predictions of Jerusalem's destruction are also found in Micah 3:12. Scholars use this section to date Mark, and all works believed to have copied from it, slightly before or after the year 70.

In Mark 15:29 Jesus is mocked as having claimed that he would destroy the Temple and raise it again in three days, a statement of Jesus that Mark does not record in the narrative, although he is falsely accused of claiming he would destroy the man made Temple and replace it in three days in 14:57. This gives rise to the interpretation of the Temple's destruction as the death of Jesus' body, the body of God, and his resurrection three days later. That Jesus predicted the Temple's destruction and his rebuilding of it in three days is stated in John 2:19 and is used as evidence against him in Matthew 26:61.

== Olivet Discourse (13:24–37) ==
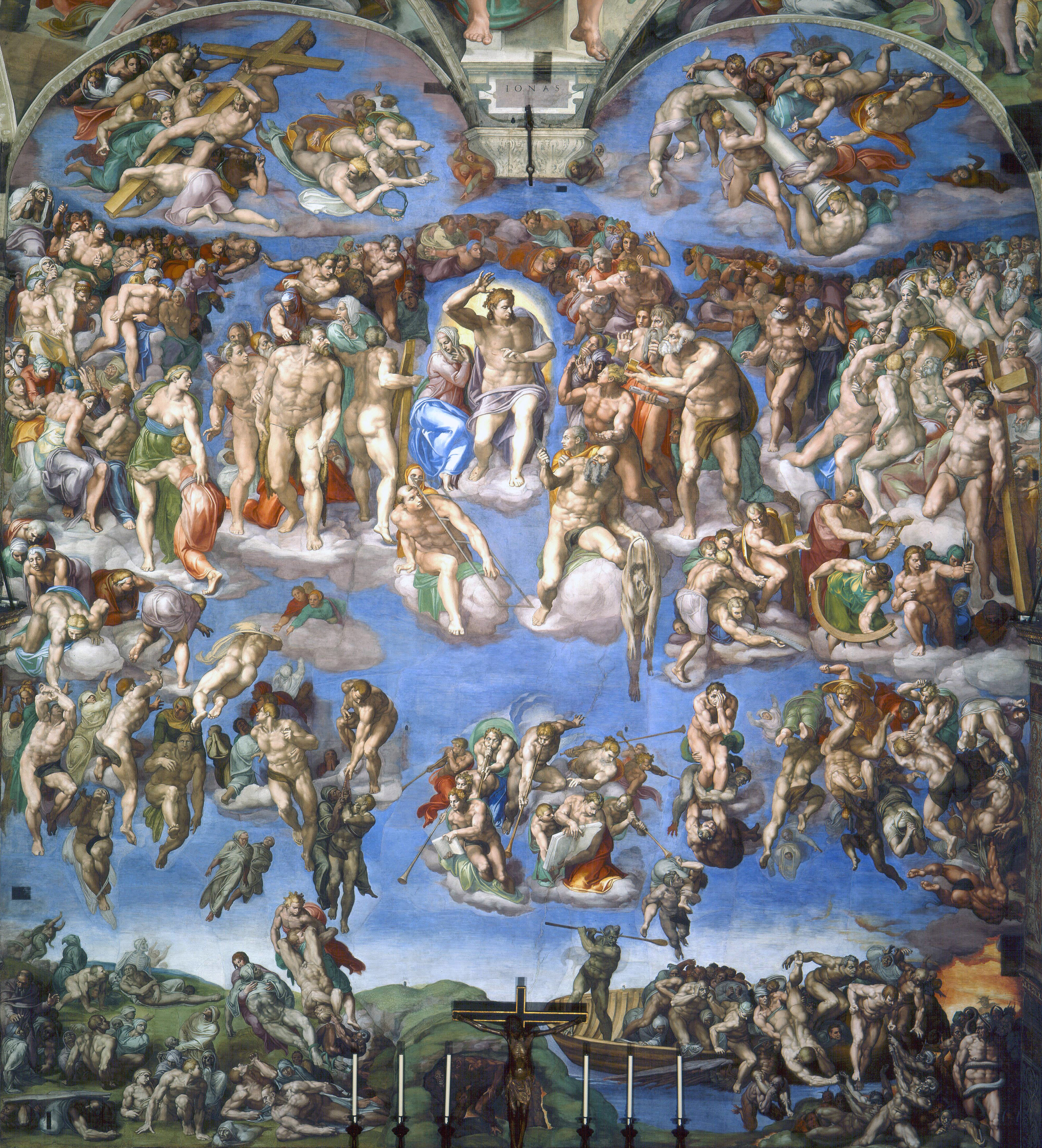
Last Judgement by Michelangelo

After the destruction of the Temple and the event in Judea, Jesus seems to predict a universe shaking event and his great triumph:

But in those days, after that tribulation, the sun shall be darkened, and the moon shall not give her light, and the stars of heaven shall fall, and the powers that are in heaven shall be shaken. And then shall they see the Son of man coming in the clouds with great power and glory. And then shall he send his angels, and shall gather together his elect from the four winds, from the uttermost part of the earth to the uttermost part of heaven. Now learn a parable of the fig tree; When her branch is yet tender, and putteth forth leaves, ye know that summer is near: So ye in like manner, when ye shall see these things come to pass, know that it is nigh, even at the doors. Verily I say unto you, that this generation shall not pass, till all these things be done. Heaven and earth shall pass away: but my words shall not pass away. (24-31 KJV)

He then tells them that no one except the "Father", God, knows when this will all happen, not even the "Son", Jesus himself, see also Kenosis. He then uses the parable of the Man Going On a Far Journey to describe his followers as his servants watching their master's house waiting for him to return.

Jesus thus ends with two parables, the parable of the Leafing Fig Tree and the parable of the man on a journey. The fig tree, which Jesus cursed in Mark 11:14 for being barren, is now used as a metaphor. Whereas it is barren now, when it is summer it will be about to bear its fruit, like these signs signal that God's plan is about to be fulfilled. The parable of the man on the journey cautions the disciples that they should always be on watch, as he could return at any moment and would want the house well cared for.

There are several interpretations of all this. The most straightforward is that there will be a horrible event in Judea and that at some unspecified time Jesus will come and gather his "elect", the term early Christians used to refer to themselves. Craig Keener argues that the statements in Mark 9:1 and 13:33 predicts the imminence of Jesus’s second coming. Hays and Keener argue that the Parousia was contingent on the repentance of Israel, and that unfulfilled eschatological expectations would not be failures or unusual in the Jewish prophetic context. The word for generation also means race in Ancient Greek, and so could refer to the Jews, or perhaps all people. Others think Jesus is just using the apocalyptic language of his time symbolically, as many Jewish prophets did, to highlight the fact that Christian suffering and Jerusalem's destruction, though seemingly the end of the world, are necessary to achieve what Jesus deems will be the final victory of good over evil and that this generation refers to seeing Jerusalem's destruction.

Many have interpreted this as Jesus predicting the end of the world and his Second Coming. Jesus' statement about the Sun and Moon sounds very apocalyptic. It is a quote from Isaiah 13:10 where Isaiah uses it metaphorically as part of his prophecy of the fall of Babylon. The stars falling from the sky is from Isaiah 34:4 about God's judgement on all the nations of the world. Perhaps there is a political connotation here. By using these two quotations together, Jesus might be comparing the Roman domination Israel is currently undergoing to the Babylonian captivity it had undergone six centuries previously. The coming of the kingdom of God would be replacing Roman rule with God's rule just as the Jews were freed from Babylon. Yet whereas the Babylonian captivity ended with the return to Jerusalem, the replacement of Roman rule will be preceded by Jerusalem's destruction, a sharp change in what people thought of as the coming of God's kingdom. It was a general belief of the Jews that the messiah would rule from Jerusalem, and many Christians have believed that after the Second Coming Jesus will rule the world from Jerusalem. Many Christians have seen this as a prediction of Roman tyranny being overcome by Christianity, as Jerusalem, then "Babylon" (Rome), then all the unrighteous nations will be replaced by the Son of Man's coming. The Roman Catholic Church has always seen itself as partly the kingdom of God on Earth and some have thought the coming of the Christian Church is what is predicted here.

The Son of Man coming in clouds is from Daniel 7:13. This is from a prophetic dream of Daniel about a kingdom that would "devour" the whole world and how it would be replaced by the Son of Man's "everlasting kingdom". "The elect" will be "gathered" from every part of the world and "unto Heaven", a reversal of Zechariah 2:10 where God would come and live among his chosen. God rounding up his chosen people is found in many Old Testament books, but none have the Son of Man doing this, showing how Jesus had altered the prophecies about the Messiah.

Just before Stephen is stoned in Acts, he says "I see heaven open and the Son of Man standing at the right hand of God." (7:56), perhaps showing the Son of Man's coming means Heaven. In John 12:23 Jesus speaks of the Son of Man's glory as his death: "The hour has come for the Son of Man to be glorified. I tell you the truth, unless a kernel of wheat falls to the ground and dies, it remains only a single seed. But if it dies, it produces many seeds."

Augustine reflected, drawing from this passage, that a person should be more concerned with their own "last day", their death.

...when it tells us to watch for the last day, every one should think of as concerning his own last day; lest haply when ye judge or think the last day of the world to be far distant, ye slumber with respect to your own last day...Let no one then search out for the last Day, when it is to be; but let us watch all by our good lives, lest the last day of any one of us find us unprepared, and such as any one shall depart hence on his last day, such he be found in the last day of the world. Nothing will then assist thee which thou shalt not have done here. His own works will succour, or his own works will overwhelm every one.

A description of the end times is greatly expanded in the Book of Revelation, which describes itself as a vision given by Jesus after his death to the author. Here, too, are predictions of immediate upheavals (1:3) coupled with delays in the final working out of God's plan of thousands of years or even indefinite periods of time (20). A similar account is also found in Matthew 24, where the description of the coming of the Son of Man is greatly expanded. Luke 21 specifically states that there will be armies surrounding Jerusalem and that will precede desolation. This is all the information that Jesus gives about the far future in the Gospels.

In the Gospel of Thomas saying 51 a disciple asks Jesus when the "new world" would arrive and Jesus replies "What you are looking forward to has come, but you don't know it." In saying 113 they ask him when the "kingdom" will come. "It will not come by watching for it. It will not be said, 'Look, here!' or 'Look, there!' Rather, the Father's kingdom is spread out upon the earth, and people don't see it."

This ends the section of Mark showing how Jesus was the prophesied Jewish Messiah but not in the way people had expected. It was the general belief that the Messiah's coming would inaugurate the final victory of good over evil, and end all worldly suffering, thought to be a symptom of evil. Jesus entered Jerusalem in Mark 11 in the manner of the messiah who would bring God's kingdom on Earth, then cursed the fig tree outside the Temple in which he fought with the money changers. He then defeated the priests and taught the people, establishing his authority and the priests lack of it. He then ends with a prediction of the Temple's destruction and then uses the fig tree as metaphor to show how what Jesus has described will lead to the coming of God's kingdom. Yet whereas the Messiah entering Jerusalem as Jesus had done was to bring God's rule immediately, Jesus says that it will come later, at an unknown time after seemingly calamitous events. Jesus is speaking of these things on the Mount of Olives, where Zechariah 14:4 has the final messianic battle occurring. In the next and final section Mark shows the necessity of suffering, Jesus' Passion, as a part of God's plan. Jesus is crowned the King of the Jews only on the cross and only overcomes all suffering and evil by his resurrection from the dead.

== Sources ==
- Brown, Raymond E., An Introduction to the New Testament, Doubleday 1997 ISBN 0-385-24767-2
- Brown, Raymond E., et al., The New Jerome Biblical Commentary, Prentice Hall 1990 ISBN 0-13-614934-0
- Kilgallen, John J., A Brief Commentary on the Gospel of Mark, Paulist Press 1989 ISBN 0-8091-3059-9
- Miller, Robert J. (Editor), The Complete Gospels, Polebridge Press 1994 ISBN 0-06-065587-9

Preceded by Mark 12	Chapters of the Bible; Gospel of Mark	Succeeded by Mark 14
