= Luke 21 =

- ← chapter 20 chapter 22 →
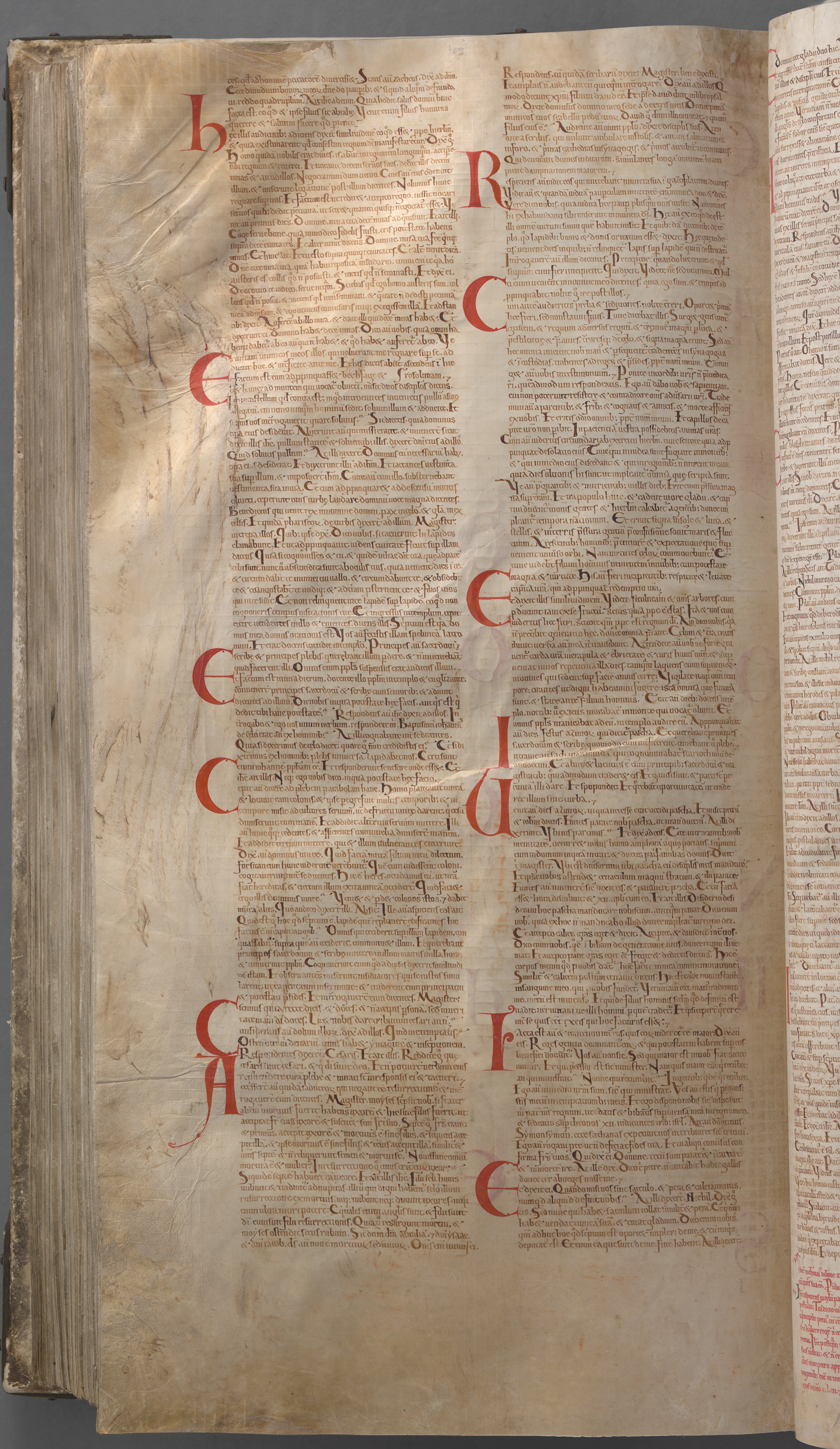
- The Latin text of Luke 19:7–22:38 in Codex Gigas (13th century)
- Book: Gospel of Luke
- Category: Gospel
- Christian Bible part: New Testament
- Order in the Christian part: 3

Luke 21 is the twenty-first chapter of the Gospel of Luke in the New Testament of the Christian Bible. It records the observations and predictions of Jesus Christ delivered in the temple in Jerusalem, and his exhortation "to be watchful". Early Christian tradition uniformly affirmed that Luke the Evangelist composed this Gospel as well as the Acts of the Apostles. Critical opinion on the tradition was evenly divided at the end of the 20th century.

== Text ==
The original text was written in Koine Greek. Some early manuscripts containing the text of this chapter are:

- Papyrus 75 (AD 175–225)
- Codex Vaticanus (325–350)
- Codex Sinaiticus (330–360)
- Codex Bezae (~400)
- Codex Washingtonianus (~400)
- Codex Alexandrinus (400–440)
- Codex Ephraemi Rescriptus (~450; extant verses 21–38)

This chapter is divided into 38 verses.

== Lesson of the widow's two mites (verses 1–4) ==
Verses 1–4 record Jesus's observation that a poor widow, offering two mites, had genuinely contributed more to the temple than the gifts offered by rich people. Mark 12:41–44 records the same event.

=== Verse 4 ===
For all these out of their abundance have put in offerings for God, but she out of her poverty put in all the livelihood that she had.

The words "for God" are based on the text in some early manuscripts, but many other manuscripts omit these words.

== The beauty of the temple (verses 5–6) ==
^{5} And while some were speaking of the temple, how it was adorned with noble stones and offerings, he said, ^{6} “As for these things that you see, the days will come when there will not be left here one stone upon another that will not be thrown down.

The New International Version translates verse 5: Greek: τινων λεγοντων περι του ιερου, tinōn legontōn peri tou hierou) as "Some of his disciples ...", but some other versions suggest "some people" i.e. not specifically disciples of Jesus. Protestant theologian Heinrich Meyer argues that "it is plain from the discourse itself" that Jesus was speaking to his disciples.

The "beautiful stones" and the "gifts dedicated to God" both contribute to the splendor of the temple. Luke sets this dialogue inside the temple itself, whereas in Matthew and Mark it is set outside the temple.

== The destruction of the Temple (verses 20–24) ==
Matthew and Mark state that Jesus spoke privately to his disciples on Mount Olivet about the end times and the destruction of Jerusalem: see Olivet Discourse. In contrast, Luke does not present this teaching as delivered privately:

In the daytime, He was teaching in the temple, but at night He went out and stayed on the mountain called Olivet. Then early in the morning all the people came to Him in the temple to hear Him.

He tells them, These things which you see: the days will come in which not one stone shall be left upon another that shall not be thrown down. They (whether it be his disciples or his audience more generally) ask when this will be. In Mark's account, the question is asked by Peter, James, John and Andrew.

Luke 21:24 finishes by saying that Jerusalem will be under Gentile control until the "times of the Gentiles" comes to an end. Thomas Ice writes that both preterists and futurists believe this passage refers to the destruction of the Second Temple.

== Parable of the budding fig tree (verses 29–33) ==
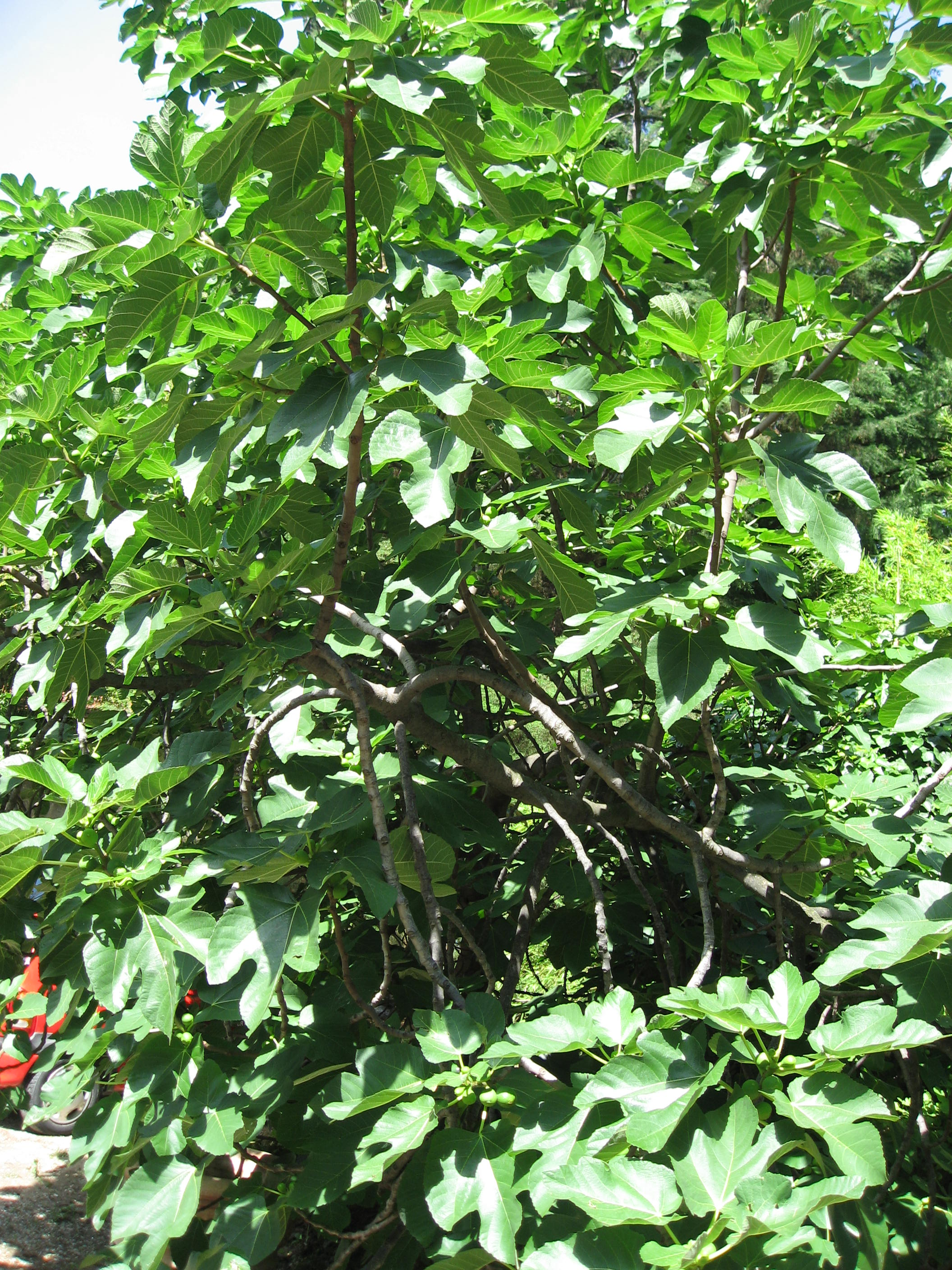
A fig tree

This parable about the Kingdom of God is also found in Matthew 24:32–35 and Mark 13:28–31. The parable involves a fig tree, as does the equally brief parable of the barren fig tree, with which it should not be confused. Luke presents this parable as eschatological in nature: like the leaves of the fig tree, the signs spoken of in the Olivet Discourse of Luke 21:5–28 indicate the coming of the Kingdom of God.

== Watchfulness (verses 34–36) ==
For it (that day) will come on all those who live on the face of the whole earth.

Some versions read "it will come down on you like a snare".

Irish Archbishop John McEvilly comments that

The day of the Lord shall insnare unto ruin and destruction, those men who "sit", in idleness and unconcern, absorbed in the enjoyment of sensual and illicit pleasures, with all their thoughts on earth, just as a snare catches those birds that settle on the earth when they least expect it, while the birds that are borne aloft in air escape it.

He notes 1 Thessalonians 5:2–3, Isaiah 24:17 and Psalm 10:7 (Vulgate numbering), Upon the wicked he shall rain snares, fire and brimstone, as offering comparable texts.

== See also ==
- Jerusalem
- Ministry of Jesus
- Olivet Discourse
- Parables of Jesus
- Other related Bible parts: Matthew 24, Mark 12, Mark 13

Preceded by Luke 20	Chapters of the Bible; Gospel of Luke	Succeeded by Luke 22
