= Olivet Discourse =

Biblical passage found in the Christian gospels

The Olivet Discourse or Olivet prophecy is a biblical passage found in the Synoptic Gospels in Matthew 24 and 25, Mark 13, and Luke 21. It is also known as the Little Apocalypse because it includes the use of apocalyptic language, and it includes Jesus's warning to his followers that they will suffer tribulation and persecution before the ultimate triumph of the Kingdom of God. The Olivet discourse is the last of the Five Discourses of Matthew and occurs just before the narrative of Jesus's passion beginning with the anointing of Jesus.

In all three synoptic Gospels this episode includes the Parable of the Budding Fig Tree.

It is unclear whether the tribulation Jesus describes is a now past, present, or future event. Preterists believe the passage largely refers to events surrounding the destruction of the Temple in Jerusalem and as such is used to date the Gospel of Mark around the year 70. Futurists believe the prophecy is broken into different parts, and partly “refers to events that are still yet to come”.

== Setting ==
The discourse is widely believed by scholars to contain material delivered on a variety of occasions.

In the Gospel of Matthew and the Gospel of Mark, Jesus spoke this discourse to his disciples privately on the Mount of Olives, opposite Herod's Temple. In the Gospel of Luke, Jesus taught over a period of time in the Temple and stayed at night on the Mount of Olives.

== Biblical narrative ==
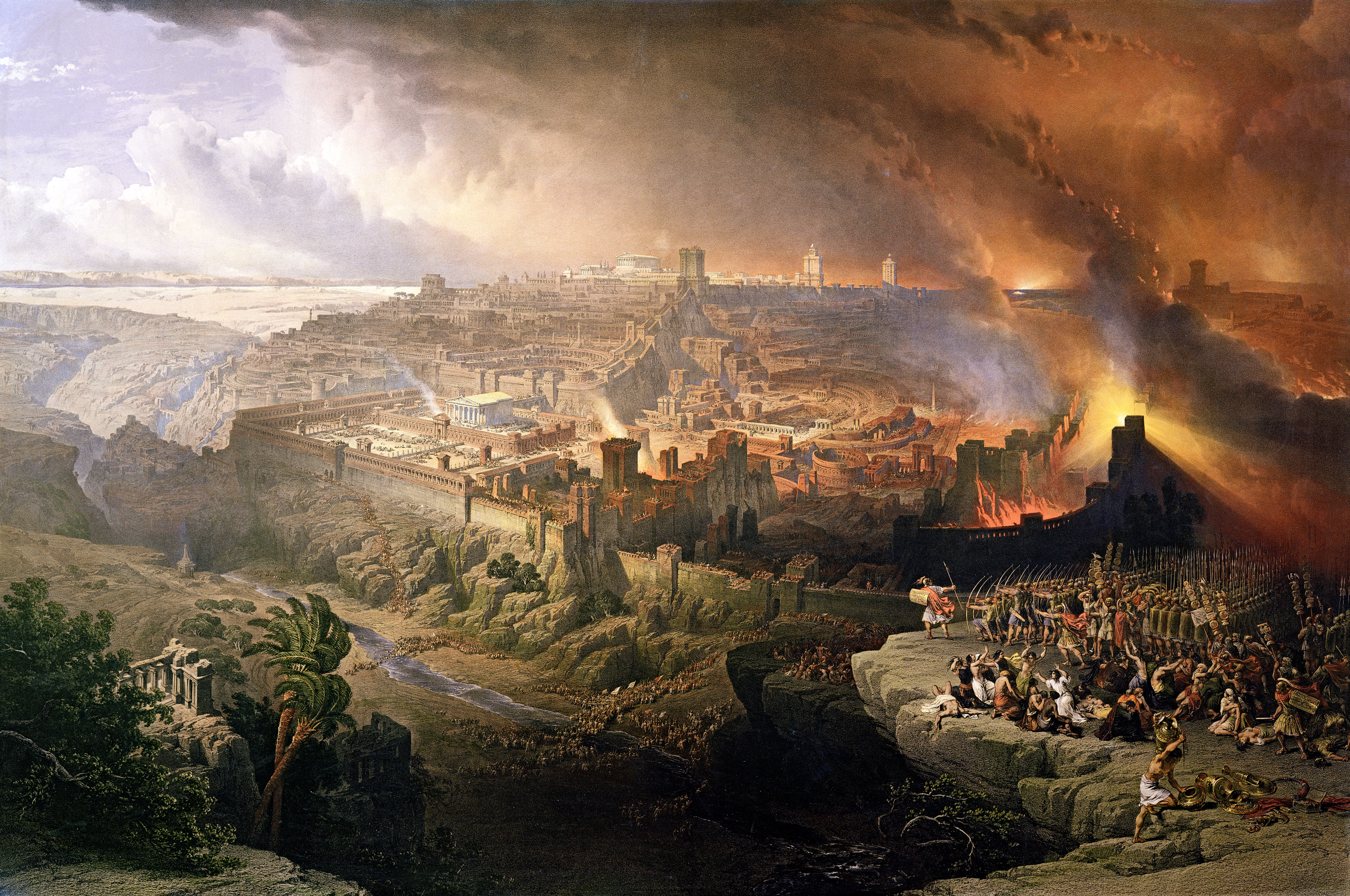
The Siege and Destruction of Jerusalem, by David Roberts (1850)

According to the narrative of the synoptic Gospels, an anonymous disciple remarks on the greatness of Herod's Temple. Jesus responds that not one of those stones would remain intact in the building, and the whole thing would be reduced to rubble.

The disciples asked Jesus, "When will this happen, and what will be the sign of your coming and of the end of the age?" Jesus first warns them about things that would happen:

- Some would claim to be Christ (see also Antichrist);
- There would be wars and rumours of wars.

Then Jesus identifies "the beginnings of birth pains":

- Nations rising up against nations, and kingdoms against kingdoms;
- Earthquakes;
- Famines;
- Pestilence;
- Fearful events.

Next he described more birth pains which would lead to the coming Kingdom:

- False prophets;
- Apostasy;
- Persecution of the followers of Jesus;
- The spread of Jesus' message (the Gospel) around the world.

Jesus then warned the disciples about the abomination of desolation "standing where it does not belong".

After Jesus described the "abomination that causes desolation", he warns that the people of Judea should flee to the mountains as a matter of such urgency that they shouldn't even return to get things from their homes. Jesus also warned that if it happened in winter or on the Sabbath fleeing would be even more difficult. Jesus described this as a time of "Great Tribulation" worse than anything that had gone before.

Jesus then states that immediately after the time of tribulation people would see a sign, "the sun will be darkened, and the moon will not give its light; the stars will fall from the sky, and the heavenly bodies will be shaken".

The statements about the Sun and Moon turning dark sound quite apocalyptic, as it appears to be a quote from the Book of Isaiah. The description of the Sun, Moon and stars going dark is also used elsewhere in the Old Testament. Joel wrote that this would be a sign before the great and dreadful Day of the Lord. The Book of Revelation also mentions the Sun and Moon turning dark during the sixth seal of the seven seals, but the passage adds more detail than the previous verses mentioned.

Jesus states that after the time of tribulation and the sign of the Sun, Moon and stars going dark the Son of Man would be seen arriving in the clouds with power and great glory. The Son of Man would be accompanied by the angels and at the trumpet call the angels would "gather his elect from the four winds, from one end of heaven to the other".(Matthew 24:31)

Those who subscribe to the doctrine of the "rapture" (a view popular in American Evangelicalism) find support in this verse, reading this as meaning that people would be gathered from Earth and taken to heaven. This directly relates to a quotation from the Book of Zechariah in which God (and the contents of heaven in general) will come to Earth and live among the elect, who by necessity are gathered together for this purpose.

In the Olivet Discourse, Jesus was reported to have told his disciples,

"Truly I tell you, this generation [Greek: genea] will certainly not pass away until all these things have happened. Heaven and earth will pass away, but my words will not pass away."

— Matt. 24:34-35; Mark 13:30-31; Luke 21:32-33

There is considerable debate about the correct translation of the word genea. The most common English translation is currently "generation", but German Bibles, genea is instead translated as "family/lineage" (geschlecht). Likewise for Danish, Swedish and Norwegian (slægt, släkte and slekt, respectively). The Danish linguist Iver Larsen argues that the word "generation" as it was used in the English King James Version of the Bible (1611) had a much wider meaning than it has today, and that the correct current translation of genea (in the specific context of the second coming story) should be "kind of people." (specifically the "good" kind of people; the disciple's kind of people, who, like the words of Jesus, will endure through all the tribulations). In Psalm 14, the King James version clearly uses "generation" in this now outdated sense, when it declares that "God is in the generation of the righteous." According to Larsen, the Oxford Universal Dictionary states that the latest attested use of genea in the sense of "class, kind or set of persons" took place in 1727. Larsen concludes that the meaning of "generation" in the English language has narrowed considerably since then.

Bible scholar Philip La Grange du Toit argues that genea is mostly used to describe a timeless and spiritual family/lineage of good or bad people in The New Testament, and that this is the case also for the second coming discourse in Matthew 24. In contrast to Larsen however, he argues that the word genea here denotes the "bad" kind of people," because Jesus had used the word in that pejorative sense in the preceding context (chapter 23.) He also lists the main competing translation alternatives, and some of the scholars that support the different views:

- "This generation" refers to Jesus' contemporaries who would witness "all these things" [πάντα ταῦτα] as outlined in verses 4–31, including Jesus' second coming (Davies & Allison 1997:367–368; Hare 1993:281; Maddox 1982:111–115). Because Jesus' contemporaries did not witness his second coming, some contend that Jesus erred in his predictions (Luz 2005:209; cf. Schweitzer 1910:356–364), while others argue that the Parousia was contingent on the repentance of Israel, and that unfulfilled eschatological expectations would not be failures or unusual in the Jewish prophetic context.
- "This generation" refers to Jesus' contemporaries who would witness "all these things" as outlined in verses 4–22 or 4–28, pointing to the destruction of the temple in 70 CE and everything leading up to it. Jesus' second coming (vv. 29–31) is thus excluded from "all these things" (Blomberg 1992:364; Carson 1984:507; France 2007:930; Hagner 1995:715).
- "This generation" points to the Ἰουδαῖοι (Jews or Judaeans), implying that they as a race would last until the Parousia (Hendriksen 1973:868–869; Schweizer 1976:458).
- In patristic opinion, "this generation" points to the church against which the gates of Hades would not prevail (cf. Chrysostom, Hom. Matt. 77:1; Eusebius, Frag. in Lc. ad loc).
- "This generation" points to some future generation, from Matthew's perspective, that sees "all these things" (Bock 1996:538–539; Conzelmann 1982:105).
- The words "take place" or "have happened" [γένηται] is interpreted as an ingressive aorist: "to begin" or "to have a beginning". In other words, "all these things" would start to happen in the generation of Jesus' present disciples, but would not necessarily finish in their time (Cranfield 1954:291; Talbert 2010:270).
- "This generation" points to a certain kind of people in accordance with the pejorative connotations to "generation" [γενεά] elsewhere in the gospel (Morris 1992:613; Nelson 1996:385; Rieske 2008:225; see, e.g., Mt 11:16; 12:39, 41–42, 45; 16:4; 17:17; 23:36). While DeBruyn (2010:190) and Lenski (1943:953) interpret the expression in a similar way, they connect "this generation" to a certain kind of people from the Ἰουδαῖοι who resisted Jesus (cf. view 3 discussed earlier).

In the First Epistle to the Thessalonians, Paul envisages that he and the Christians to whom he was writing would see the resurrection of the dead within their own lifetimes, though he would consider the possibility of his death prior to Jesus’ return later in life. The Gospel of John however seems to downplay a rumor that one disciple (John) would live to see the second coming:

"So the rumor spread in the community that this disciple would not die. Yet Jesus did not say to him that he would not die, but, 'If it is my will that he remain until I come, what is that to you?'"

— John 21:23

== Christian eschatology ==
There are four quite different Christian eschatological views. Preterism is the belief that all of these predictions were fulfilled by the time Jerusalem fell in 70 CE. Preterism considers that most, if not all, prophecy has been fulfilled already, usually in relation to the destruction of Jerusalem by the Romans in 70 CE.

- Partial preterism says that most (but not all) Bible prophecy, including everything within Matthew 24, Daniel, and Revelation up to chapters 19 or 20, has already been fulfilled when Jerusalem was destroyed. Since it still includes belief in a future physical Second Coming of Christ, the resurrection of the dead, and the last judgment, partial preterism falls within the parameters of orthodoxy because it conforms to the early Christian creeds.
- Full preterism says all biblical prophecy was fulfilled by 70 CE. It does not hold to a future judgment, return of Christ, or resurrection of the dead (at least not for non-Christians). Due to the belief that all biblical prophecy has been fulfilled, it is sometimes considered "radical" and usually described as "unorthodox" because it goes against the ecumenical creeds of early Christianity.

Historicism considers that most prophecy has been or will be fulfilled during the present church age. It was the chief view of Protestants from the Reformation until the mid-19th century. Only among Seventh-day Adventists is historicism applied to current conservative Christian interpretation of Tribulation understanding.

Futurism is the belief that the future Jesus predicted is the unfolding of events from trends that are already at work in contemporary human society.

Futurism typically holds that all major unfulfilled prophecies will be fulfilled during a global time of catastrophe and war known as the Great Tribulation, in which many other prophecies will be fulfilled during or after the Millennium Reign of Jesus Christ. According to many futurists, many predictions are currently being fulfilled during the Church Age, in which lawlessness and apostasy are currently plaguing secular society. This is seen as a major sign of the approaching fulfillment of all other prophecies during the Tribulation. Within evangelical Christianity over the past 150 years, futurism has come to be the dominant view of prophecy. However, around the 1970s evangelical preterism—the polar opposite of futurism—was seen as a new challenge to the dominance of futurism, particularly within the Reformed tradition. Yet, futurism continues as the prevalent view for the time being.

Futurists anticipate many coming events that will fulfill all eschatological prophecy: the seven-year period of tribulation, the Antichrist's global government the Battle of Armageddon, the Second Coming of Jesus, the millennial reign of Christ, the eternal state, and the two resurrections.

In his popular book, The Late Great Planet Earth, first published in 1970, evangelical Christian author Hal Lindsey argued that prophetical information in Matthew 24 indicates that the "generation" witnessing the "rebirth of Israel" is the same generation that will observe the fulfillment of the "signs" referred to in Matthew 24:1–33—and that would be consummated by the second coming of Christ in approximately 1988. He dated it from the "rebirth of Israel" in 1948, and took a generation to be "something like forty years." Lindsey later stretched his forty-year timetable to as long as one hundred years, writing that he was no longer certain that the terminal "generation" commenced with the rebirth of Israel.

Another detailed analysis, one written by evangelical pastor Ray Stedman, calls it the "Olivet Prophecy: The most detailed prediction in the Bible". According to Stedman: "There are many predictive passages in both the Old and New Testaments, but none is clearer or more detailed than the message Jesus delivered from the Mount of Olives. This message was given during the turbulent events of the Lord's last week before the cross".

The Idealist sees the prophecy as pertaining to the entirerty of the interadvental period rather than a specific event. Idealists see prophetic passages as being of great value in teaching truths about God to be applied to present life. Many idealists see the destruction of the temple as typological of the entire Church Age that will culminate in the Second Coming of Christ and the Judgment of the whole created order.

Within conservative, evangelical Christian thought, two opposite viewpoints of the Great Tribulation have been expressed in a debate between theologians Kenneth L. Gentry and Thomas Ice.

Tribulation as a past event (Dr. Gentry)

- The Great Tribulation occurred during the 1st century.
- Those events marked the end of God's focus on and exaltation of Israel.
- Jesus' prophecies marked the beginning of the Christian era in God's plan.
- The Tribulation is God's judgment on Israel for rejecting the Messiah.
- The Tribulation judgments will be centred on local events surrounding ancient Jerusalem, and also somewhat affecting other portions of the former Roman Empire.
- The Tribulation judgments are governed by Jesus as the Christ to reflect his judgment against Israel, thus showing that he is in heaven controlling those events.

Tribulation as a future event (Dr. Ice)

- The Great Tribulation is still to come and is rapidly approaching prospect.
- Those events marked the beginning of God's focus on and exaltation of Israel.
- The prophecy says the Christian era will be concluded just after the church is taken from the world.
- Rather than being God's judgment on Israel, it is the preparation of Israel to receive her Messiah.
- The judgments involve catastrophes that literally will affect the stellar universe and impact the entire planet.
- The coming of Christ in the Tribulation requires his public, visible and physical presence to conclude those judgments.

== See also ==
- Last Judgment
- Life of Jesus in the New Testament
- Parable of the Budding Fig Tree
- Summary of Christian eschatological differences
- Historical Jesus § Apocalyptic prophet
