= Matthew 24 =

- ← chapter 23 chapter 25 →
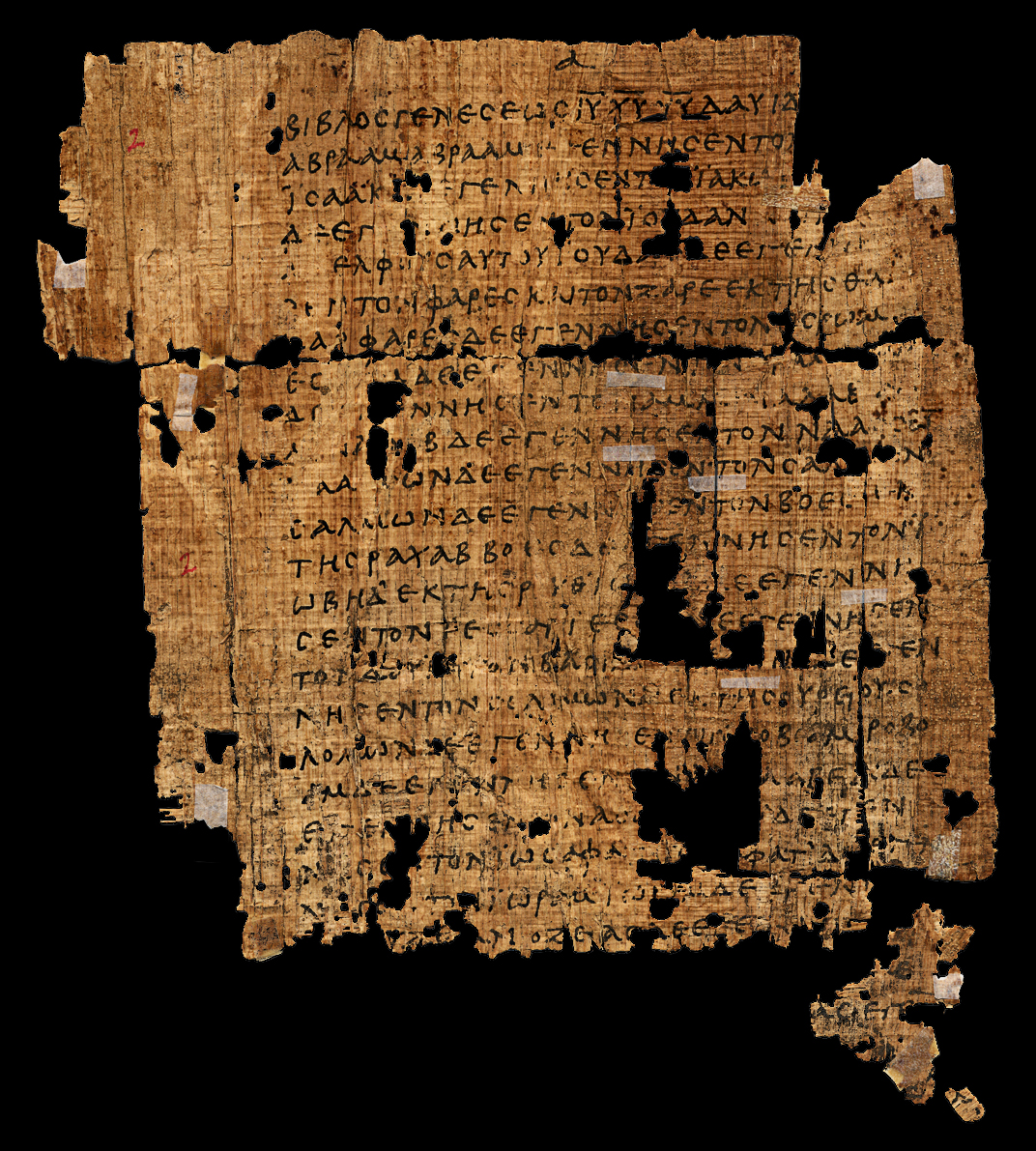
- Matthew 1:1-9,12 on the recto side of Papyrus 1, written about AD 250
- Book: Gospel of Matthew
- Category: Gospel
- Christian Bible part: New Testament
- Order in the Christian part: 1

Matthew 24 is the twenty-fourth chapter of the Gospel of Matthew in the New Testament of the Christian Bible. It commences the Olivet Discourse or "Little Apocalypse" spoken by Jesus Christ, also described as the Eschatological Discourse, which continues into chapter 25. It contains Jesus' prediction of the destruction of the Temple in Jerusalem. Mark 13 and Luke 21 also cover the same material.

== Text ==
The original text was written in Koine Greek. This chapter is divided into 51 verses.

=== Textual witnesses ===
Some early manuscripts containing the text of this chapter are:

- Codex Vaticanus (AD 325–350)
- Codex Sinaiticus (330–360)
- Codex Bezae (c. 400)
- Codex Washingtonianus (c. 400)
- Codex Alexandrinus (c. 400–440)
- Codex Ephraemi Rescriptus (c. 450)
- Codex Purpureus Rossanensis (6th century)
- Codex Sinopensis (6th century; extant: verses 3–12)
- Papyrus 83 (6th century; extant: verses 1, 6)

=== Old Testament references ===
- Matthew 24:15: Daniel 11:31; Daniel 12:11
- Matthew 24:35: Isaiah 51:6

== Context ==
In the preceding chapters (chapters 21–23), Jesus has been teaching in the Temple and debating with the Pharisees, Herodians and Sadducees. Jesus and his disciples now leave the Temple (Matthew 24:1), or the temple grounds in the New Living Translation. Theologian John Gill observes that Jesus was "never to return".

Arthur Carr reports that in descending the Kedron Valley, to the east of the temple, and then ascending the slope of the Mount of Olives, the disciples could look back and see "the Temple [rising] with its colonnade of dazzling white marble, surmounted with golden roof and pinnacles, and founded on a substructure of huge stones".

== Verses 1–2 ==
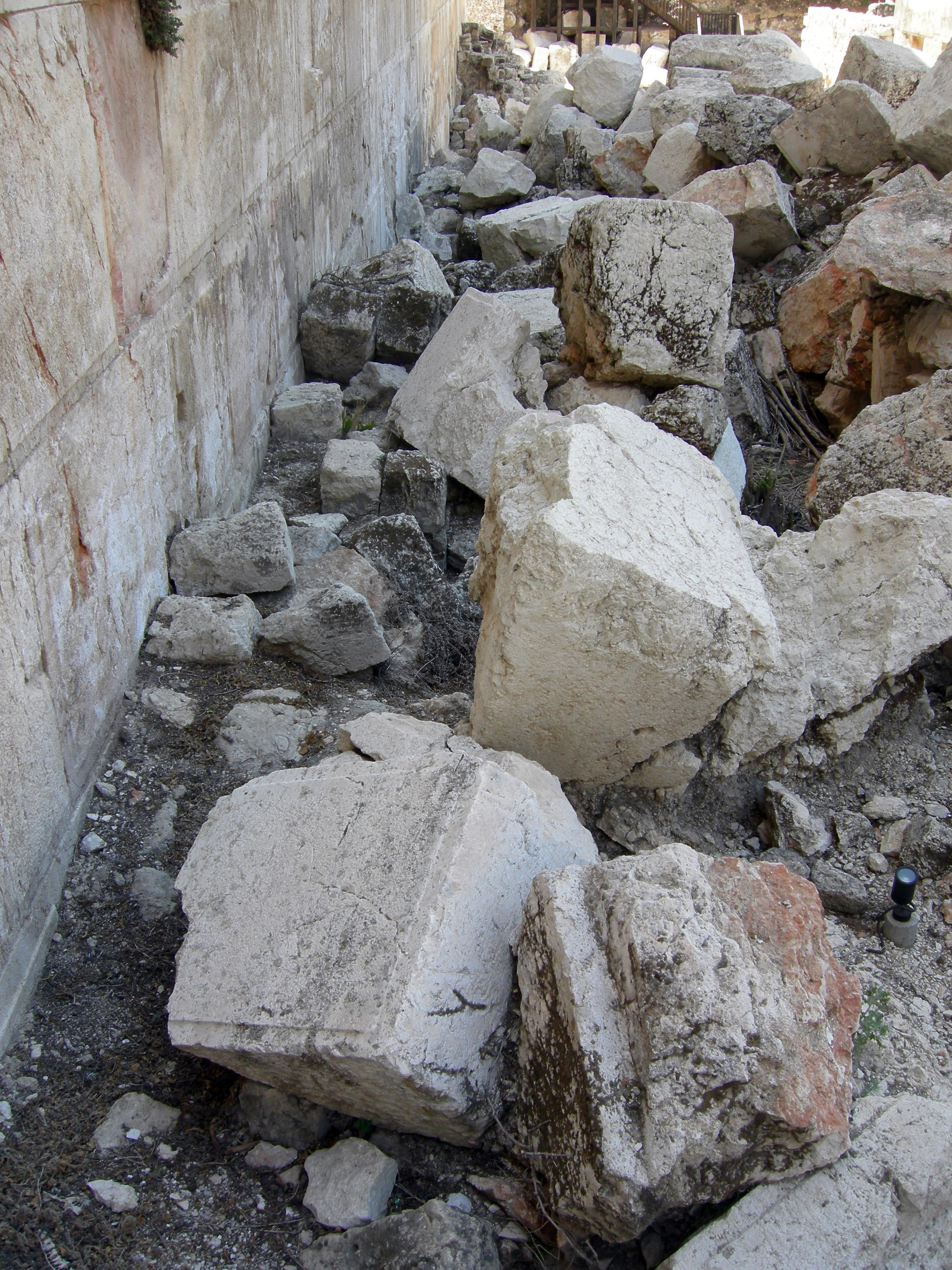
Stones from the Western Wall of the Temple Mount (Jerusalem) thrown onto the street by Roman soldiers in the Siege of Jerusalem (70 CE)

In this "introductory scene", Jesus predicts that "not one stone shall be left here upon another". The prediction follows the sentiments expressed by Jesus in Matthew 23:37–38:

O Jerusalem, Jerusalem ... See! Your house is left to you desolate.

Methodism's founder John Wesley says that the prediction was "most punctually fulfilled" in that the majority of the temple buildings were burned and then dug up on the orders of the invading Roman general Titus in 70 AD.

== Mount of Olives ==
Jesus and his disciples then proceed to the Mount of Olives, where a conversation occurs about "the end of the age". Jesus's words here called the "Little Apocalypse" or "Olivet Discourse". Jesus appears to have gone ahead of his disciples (Matthew 24:3), who come to him to enquire about the time of the temple's destruction (Tell us, when will these things be?, verse 3) and the significance of his parousia (Greek: παρουσιας, parousias). Mark 13:3 states that only Peter, James, John, and Andrew came to speak with him.

Dale Allison divides Jesus' warnings into three groups:

- the beginning of the woes in the world at large (verses 3–8),
- the intensification of the woes in the church (verses 9—14), and
- the climax of the woes in Judea (verses 15—28).

=== Verse 5 ===
For many will come in My name, saying, 'I am the Christ', and will deceive many.

This verse reads 'I am Christ', lacking the definite article, in the Geneva Bible (1599), the King James Version, and the New Matthew Bible (a modernised version of the New Testament of William Tyndale). Carr (1882 onwards) observes that "the Christ, the Messiah" is correct, departing from the King James Version then in use.

=== Verse 9 ===
Then they will hand you over to persecution, and they will kill you. You will be hated by all nations because of my name.

This foretelling of Christian suffering is concerned with making it bearable.

=== Verse 15 ===
Therefore when you see the 'abomination of desolation', spoken of by Daniel the prophet, standing in the holy place" (whoever reads, let him understand)

The "abomination of desolation" is alternatively described as the "desolating sacrifice" in the New Revised Standard Version. Citation from Daniel 11:31; Daniel 12:11

=== Verse 20 ===
Pray that your flight may not be in winter or on a sabbath.

The hardship associated with escape during winter is likely to arise from bad weather. Allison notes the absence of any explanation as to why flight on a sabbath day might also be more challenging; he suggests that Matthew's community might still have observed the sabbath as a day of rest, with its traditional travel restrictions, and been both hesitant and unprepared for flight on such a day.

=== Verses 29–31 ===
"Immediately after the tribulation of those days shall the sun be darkened, the moon shall not give its light, and the stars shall fall from heaven, and the powers of the heavens shall be shaken.
And then shall appear the sign of the Son of Man in heaven; and then shall all the tribes of the earth mourn, and they shall see the Son of Man coming in the clouds of heaven with power and great glory.
And he shall send his angels with a great sound of a trumpet."

In the Bahá'í Faith, Bahá'u'lláh gives an interpretation of Matthew 24:29-31 in his major theological work Kitáb-i-Íqán (The Book of Certitude), giving detailed explanations about the allegorical meanings of each of these phrases.

=== Verse 35 ===
Heaven and earth shall pass away, but my words shall not pass away.

Jesus’ words refer to an Old Testament saying recorded in Isaiah 51:6:

For the heavens will vanish away like smoke,
The earth will grow old like a garment,
And those who dwell in it will die in like manner;
But My salvation will be forever,
And My righteousness will not be abolished.

=== Verses 37-39 ===
^{37} For as were the days of Noah, so will be the coming of the Son of Man. ^{38} For as in those days before the flood they were eating and drinking, marrying and giving in marriage, until the day when Noah entered the ark, ^{39} and they were unaware until the flood came and swept them all away, so will be the coming of the Son of Man.

Reference is made to Noah, the flood, as recounted in Genesis 7, and the experience of those who were unaware of the impending destruction. Johann Bengel holds that the account of "eating and drinking" incorporates "the arts of cookery, confectionary, and other matters connected with luxury", but Heinrich Meyer argues that the words refer "simply" to eating [and drinking], without any "unfavourable construction".

== See also ==
- Noah's Ark
- Genesis 6, and Genesis 7
- Other related Bible parts: Isaiah 51, Jeremiah 15, Daniel 11, Daniel 12, Matthew 25, Mark 13, Luke 12, Luke 17, Luke 21, 2 Peter 3
- Rapture
- Joseph Smith–Matthew, which includes a retranslation of Matthew 24
