= Parable of the barren fig tree =

Parable taught by Jesus

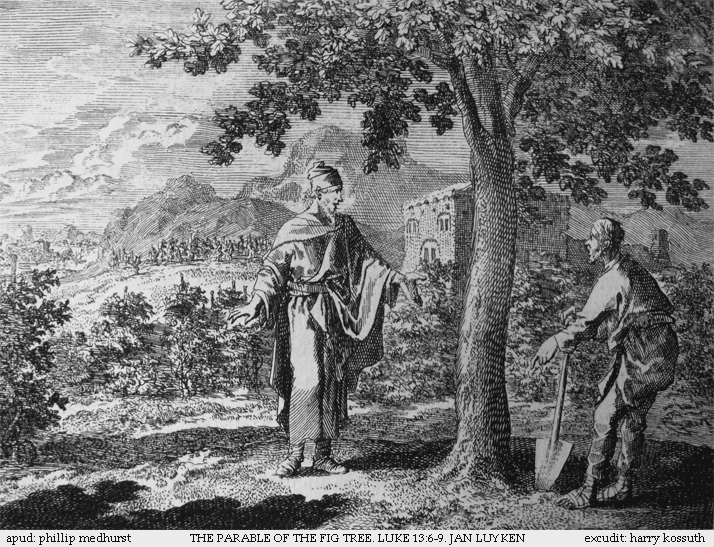
Jan Luyken etching of the parable, Bowyer Bible

The parable of the barren fig tree is a parable of Jesus which appears in Luke 13:6–9. It is about a fig tree which does not produce fruit.

== Narrative ==
The parable is as follows:

Then he told this parable: "A man had a fig tree planted in his vineyard; and he came looking for fruit on it and found none. So he said to the gardener, 'See here! For three years I have come looking for fruit on this fig tree, and still I find none. Cut it down! Why should it be wasting the soil?" He replied, 'Sir, let it alone for one more year, until I dig around it and put manure on it. If it bears fruit next year, well and good; but if not, you can cut it down.'"

— Luke 13:6–9, New Revised Standard Version

== Interpretation ==
=== Church Fathers/Catholic/Eastern Orthodox interpretation ===
The Church Fathers, and the Catholic Church subsequently, have interpreted this parable as Jesus warning Christians that they must bear fruits after their conversion worthy of repentance or risk being condemned to Hell. God, in his mercy, repeatedly checks on believers to see if they have borne fruit worthy of their baptism and conversion. If someone who has been baptized and says they are Christian has not borne fruit, they are condemned. This verse was used during the Counter-Reformation to help support the belief of the Church that faith without works is dead.

John McEvilly summarizes this interpretation, writing, "Our Lord had menaced them, that unless they did penance, and produced fruits worthy of penance (3:8), they would all perish. He illustrates their condition, and the punishment that ultimately awaits them, by the parable of the fig-tree. The fig-tree bore no fruit; neither did they perform good works; the owner waited patiently three years; so does God wait for them; the fig-tree having become utterly useless, is cut down; so shall they. "Three years." If the fig-tree after failing for two years, brings forth no fruit the third year, it never yields. This parable is accommodated by some Commentators to the Jewish synagogue. But, the illustration applies to all unrepenting sinners, whose final doom is represented by that of the fig-tree in the parable."

Cornelius a Lapide gives the synagogue interpretation referred to above, writing, "In the letter the fig-tree represents the synagogue of the Jews, which God planted through Moses; to which Christ came by the Incarnation, to cultivate it by His preaching. Christ, therefore, is the keeper of the vine, that is, of the synagogue, to whom God said, "Cut it down, for now for three years in which Thou hast preached to it, I have looked for the fruit of faith and good works, and I find none, from the unbelief, perverseness, and malice of the Jews." Christ intercedes for it, that the Father would allow Him to tend it by His preaching for one year more, or, at least, for half an one; and then, if it gave no fruit, it might be cut down. So it came to pass: for the Jews, in the fourth year of Christ's preaching, at the Passover, adding sin to sin, and becoming more and more perverse, crucified Him; so that, a few years after, Titus was sent by God as His avenger, and took Jerusalem, and destroyed all Judæa."

=== Protestant interpretation ===
In the Protestant interpretation of this parable, the owner is generally regarded as representing God the Father, who had a fig tree planted in his vineyard and came seeking fruit. The gardener (vinedresser) is Jesus. Fig trees were common trees and would rarely be planted in vineyards because the deep roots and large branches take much ground that would otherwise be used for the vines.

Another resonance is with Exodus 34:6–7 and Deuteronomy 5:9–10, where God proclaims that he is merciful, gracious and longsuffering – extending mercy to 1,000 generations of those that love him and obey his instructions, by forgiving their iniquity, transgression and sin. However, as a righteous judge, he must eventually visit the unforgiven iniquity (which is a different Hebrew word than transgression and sin – Deuteronomy 24:16) to the "third or fourth" generation of those that continue to reject him. The gardener pleads for mercy in the third year/generation and promises to create the best conditions for the fourth year/generation to bear the fruit of repentance before the full consequences of the iniquity would be realised.

The fig tree was a common symbol for Israel and may also have that meaning here, and the tree in the parable may refer to a Christian who has heard the gospel of Christ by faith unto salvation. In either case, the parable reflects Jesus offering a chance for repentance and forgiveness of sin, showing his grace toward his believers. "These three years" logically refers to the period of Jesus' ministry, or simply that is the period it took for a fig tree to bear fruit. The fig tree (gentile) was given the opportunity to be in the vineyard where it otherwise should not have been as well as the needed time to bear fruit. The vinedresser, who is Jesus, does not fail and has offered to cultivate it and so it will produce fruit.

The owner is an absentee landlord, only visiting his vineyard once a year. The law regarding first fruits, Leviticus 19:23–25, forbids eating fruit from a tree in its first three years. The vinedresser has disposed of the fruit, either by plucking it at an early stage or dropping it for compost, to prevent anyone from inadvertently eating the forbidden fruit. The story suggests that the vinedresser is an observant Jew and the owner is a pagan, unfamiliar with the laws of first fruits. Now that the tree is entering its productive period, the vinedresser has saved it from the ax, without letting the master know what happened to the earlier fruit. However, the owner has yet another surprise coming, because in the fourth year, all the fruit is offered to the Lord. Luke may have picked up a Jewish tale of a Jewish laborer outsmarting his pagan master. In the end, the faithful prevail.

== Authenticity ==
Although the parable is found only in the Gospel of Luke, the other two synoptics instead include Jesus cursing the fig tree with some remarkable coincidences. A majority of the members of the Jesus Seminar voted it authentic.

== See also ==
- Figs in the Bible
- Life of Jesus in the New Testament
