= Sermon on the Mount =

Collection of sayings and teachings of Jesus

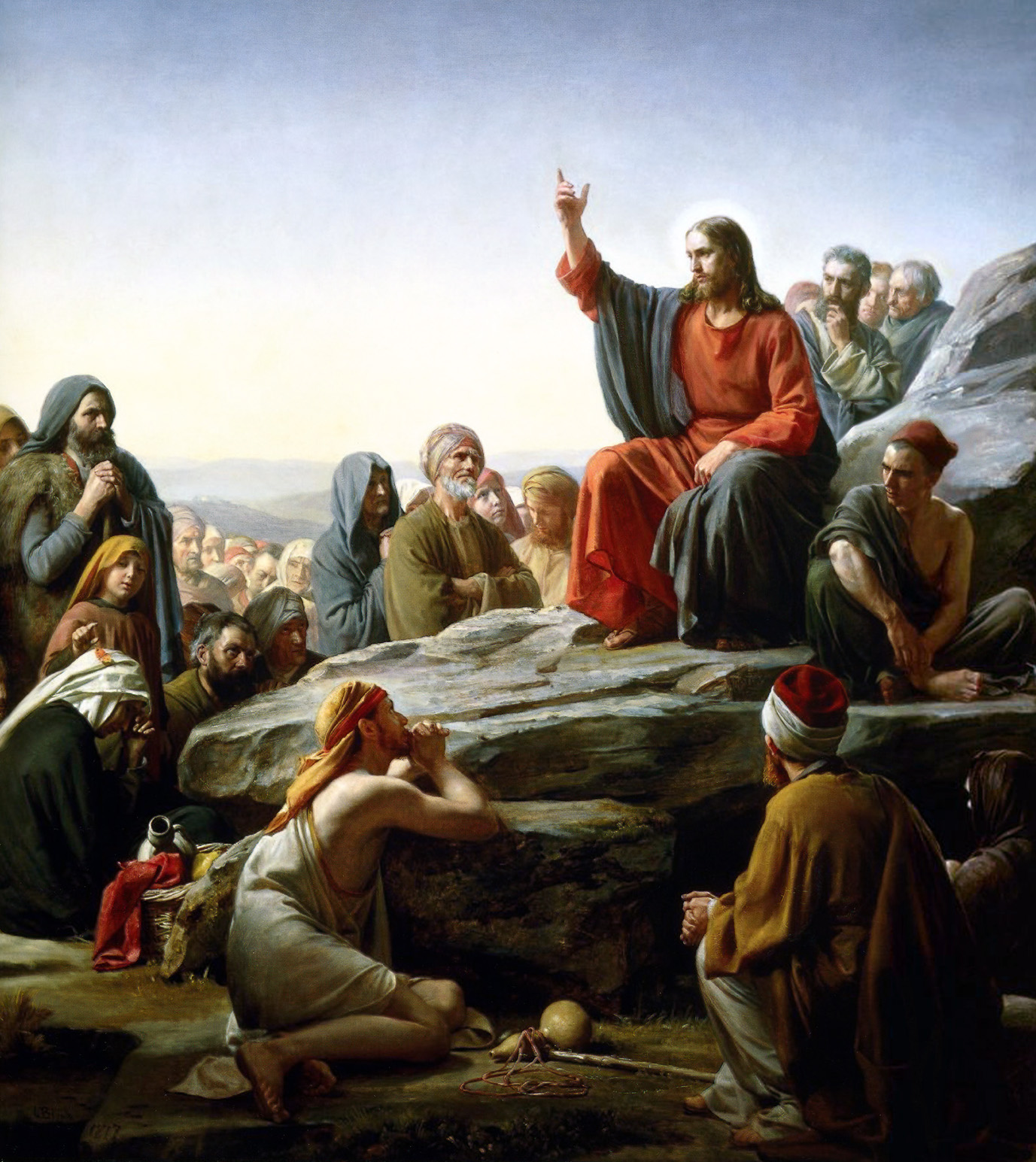
Sermon on the Mount, an 1877 painting by Carl Bloch

The Sermon on the Mount (translated from Augustine's title De sermone Domini in monte) is a discourse delivered by Jesus of Nazareth found in chapters 5, 6, and 7 of the Gospel of Matthew that summarizes his moral teachings. It is the first of five discourses in the Gospel and has been one of the most widely quoted sections of the Gospels.

== Background and setting ==
The Sermon on the Mount is placed relatively early in Matthew's portrayal of Jesus's ministry—following, in chapter 3, his baptism by John and, in chapter 4, his sojourn and temptation in the desert, his call of four disciples, and his early preaching in Galilee.

The Sermon is the first of the five discourses in the Gospel of Matthew, the others being the discourse on discipleship (10), the discourse of parables (13), the discourse on the community of faith (18), and the discourse on future events (24–25). Also, like all the other "discourses", this one has Matthew's concluding statement (7:28–29) that distinguishes it from the material that follows. For similar statements at the end of the other discourses, see 11:1; 13:53; 19:1; 26:1.

Traditionally, the Mount of Beatitudes has been commemorated by Christians as the physical site at which the sermon took place. Other locations, such as Mount Arbel and the Horns of Hattin, have also been suggested as possibilities.

This sermon is one of the most widely quoted sections of the canonical gospels, including some of the best-known sayings attributed to Jesus, such as the Beatitudes and the commonly recited version of the Lord's Prayer. It also contains what many consider to be the central tenets of Christian discipleship.

The setting for the sermon is given in Matthew 5:1–2. There, Jesus is said to see the crowds, to go up the mountain accompanied by his disciples, to sit down, and to begin his speech. He comes down from the mountain in Matthew 8:1. In several theological and biblical traditions, the Sermon on the Mount is regarded as the New Testament counterpart to the giving of the Ten Commandments on Mount Sinai, which, according to tradition, was revealed by God in the presence of the entire Israelite people. Both events occur on a mountain, emphasizing their significance as moments of direct encounter between God and his people. Frederic Godet described the location of Jesus' teaching as "the mount where Jesus speaks is as the Sinai of the new covenant." Joseph Ratzinger (Pope Benedict XVI) writes that because Matthew presents Jesus as "the new Moses" throughout his Gospel, he is seated here in teaching authority on "the cathedra of the mountain", and that the sermon is "the new Torah brought by Jesus". Both the Hebrew Bible and the New Testament use the history of Israelites to frame the ways in which God revealed his will to humanity, particularly through the prophets.

== Components ==
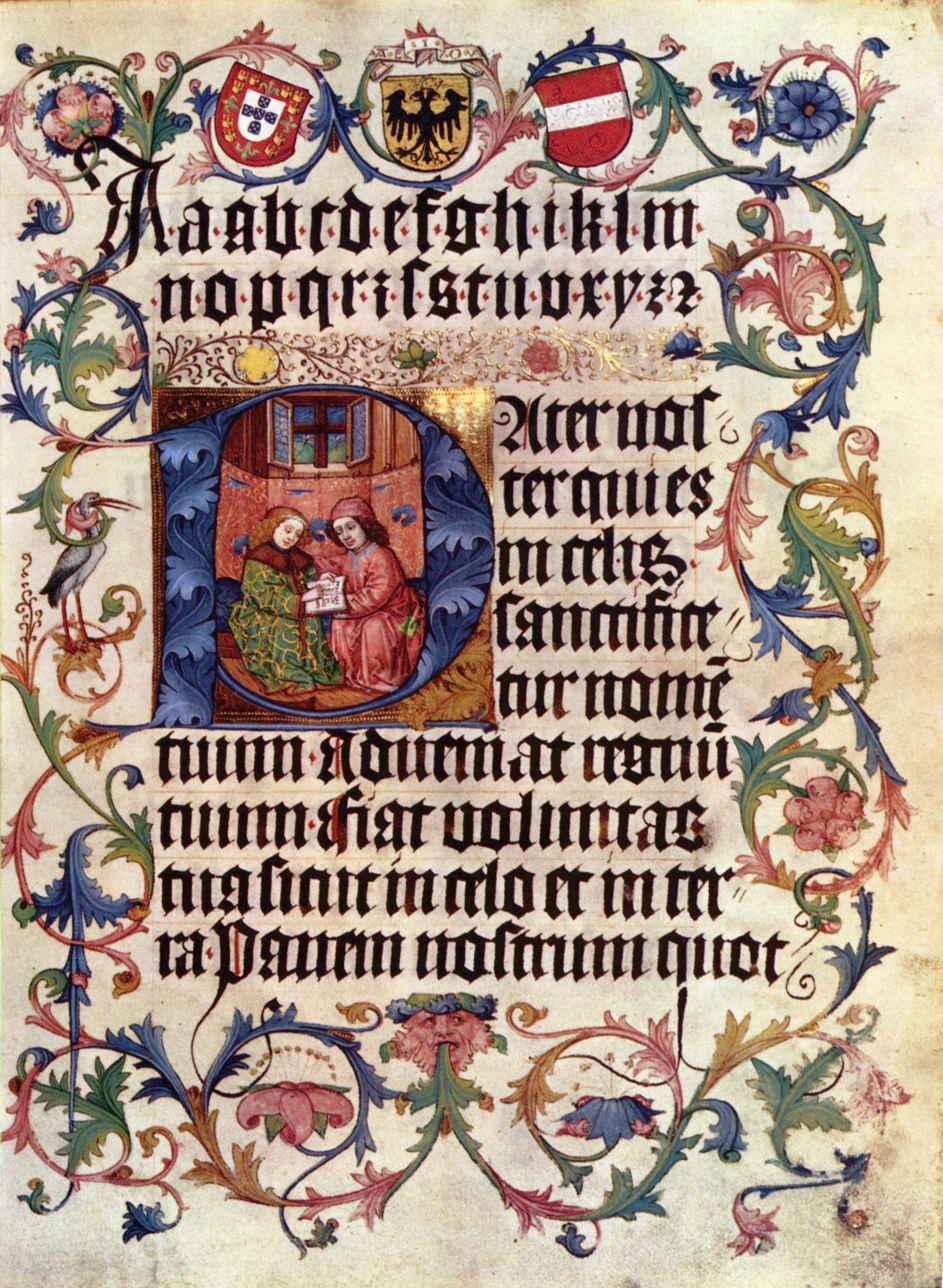
A 1500 illuminated manuscript in Vienna, Austria, featuring the Lord's Prayer

Although the issues of Matthew's compositional plan for the Sermon on the Mount remain unresolved among scholars, its structural components are clear.

Matthew 5:3–12 includes the Beatitudes. These describe the character of the people of the Kingdom of Heaven, expressed as "blessings". The Greek word most versions of the Gospel render as "blessed" can also be translated "happy" (Matthew 5:3–12 in Young's Literal Translation for an example). In Matthew, there are eight (or nine) blessings, while in Luke there are four, followed by four woes. Nolland notes that such extended lists of beatitudes are uncommon early Jewish literature, where they usually occur singly or in pairs, and that the eight third-person blessings of Matthew 5:3–10 are framed as a unit by the repetition of the clause "for theirs is the kingdom of heaven" in verses 3 and 10. He also notes that the Beatitudes function as an expanded restatement of Jesus's initial proclamation that "the kingdom of heaven is at hand" (Matthew 4:17).

The Beatitudes' language echoes the Old Testament: good news to the "poor in spirit" and "those who mourn" alludes to (Isaiah 61:1–2), a passage Matthew also cites at Matthew 11:5. "The meek… shall inherit the earth" alludes to Psalm 37:11. In the sermon these hopes of reversal are attached to the coming of the kingdom of heaven. Together, the Beatitudes present a new set of ideals that focus on love and humility rather than force and mastery, and echo the highest ideals of Jesus's teachings on spirituality and compassion.

In Christian teachings, the Works of Mercy, which have corporal and spiritual components, have resonated with the theme of the Beatitude for mercy. These teachings emphasize that these acts of mercy provide both temporal and spiritual benefits.

Matthew 5:13–16 presents the metaphors of salt and light. This completes the profile of God's people presented in the Beatitudes and acts as the introduction to the next section.

There are two parts in this section, using the terms "salt of the earth" and Light of the World to refer to the disciples – implying their value. Elsewhere, in John 8:12, Jesus applies 'Light of the World' to himself.

The longest section of the Sermon is Matthew 5:17–48, traditionally referred to as "the Antitheses" or "Matthew's Antitheses". In the section, Jesus fulfils and reinterprets the Old Covenant and in particular its Ten Commandments, contrasting with what "you have heard" from others. Nolland treats the immediately preceding unit, Matthew 5:17–20, as the introduction to the antitheses: it supplies "an optic for understanding the antitheses to come", pre-empting the impression that the antitheses which follow contradict the Mosaic Law. On this reading, the claim that Jesus came "not to abolish but to fulfil" supports his teaching aims "to enable God's people to live out the Law more effectively", and the demand of Matthew 5:20 calls for an abundant righteousness exceeding that of the scribes and Pharisees. In the first antithesis (Matthew 5:21–22), the prohibition of murder is extended to anger and contemptuous speech ("Raca"), through an escalating series that runs from the local court to the council to "the Gehenna of fire". The qualification "without a cause", familiar from the King James Version, is an early scribal addition that softens the saying and is omitted in modern critical texts. He also advises to turning the other cheek, and to love one's enemies, in contrast to taking an eye for an eye. According to most interpretations of Matthew 5:17, 18, 19, and 20, and most Christian views of the Old Covenant, these new interpretations of the Law and Prophets are not opposed to the Old Testament, which was the position of Marcion, but form Jesus's new teachings which bring about salvation, and hence must be adhered to, as emphasized in Matthew 7:24–27 towards the end of the sermon.

In Matthew 6, Jesus condemns doing what would normally be "good works" simply for recognition and not from the heart, such as those of alms (6:1–4), prayer (6:5–15), and fasting (6:16–18). The discourse goes on to condemn the superficiality of materialism and calls the disciples not to worry about material needs or fret about the future, but to "seek" God's kingdom first. Within the discourse on ostentation, Matthew presents an example of correct prayer. Luke places this in a different context. The Lord's Prayer (6:9–13) contains parallels to 1 Chronicles 29:10–18.

The first part of Matthew 7 (Matthew 7:1–6) deals with judging. Jesus condemns those who judge others without first sorting out their own affairs on the matter: "Judge not, that ye be not judged."

The Golden Rule of Matthew 7:12 ("whatever you wish that others would do to you, do also to them") concludes the main body of the sermon that began at Matthew 5:17. the rule's closing words, "for this is the Law and the Prophets", echo the language of that opening verse and reinforce its claim. He also notes the rabbinic parallel attributed to Hillel, who according to the Babylonian Talmud (Shabbat 31a) summarised the Torah for a Gentile in a negative form of the rule. Craig Blomberg calls the Golden Rule the heart of Jesus' ethic and notes its proactive statement (as opposed to the more common negative form), thereby taking moral initiative to do good to others.

In verses verses 13–27, Jesus sermon closes with three contrastive illustrations that pose the same choice to the audience, of how to react to what they heard: the narrow or the wide gate, the good or the bad tree by which true and false prophets are known by their fruits, and the wise versus foolish builders. Matthew then reports that the crowds "were astonished at his teaching, for he was teaching them as one who had authority, and not as their scribes" (Matthew 7:28–29).

== Teachings and theology ==
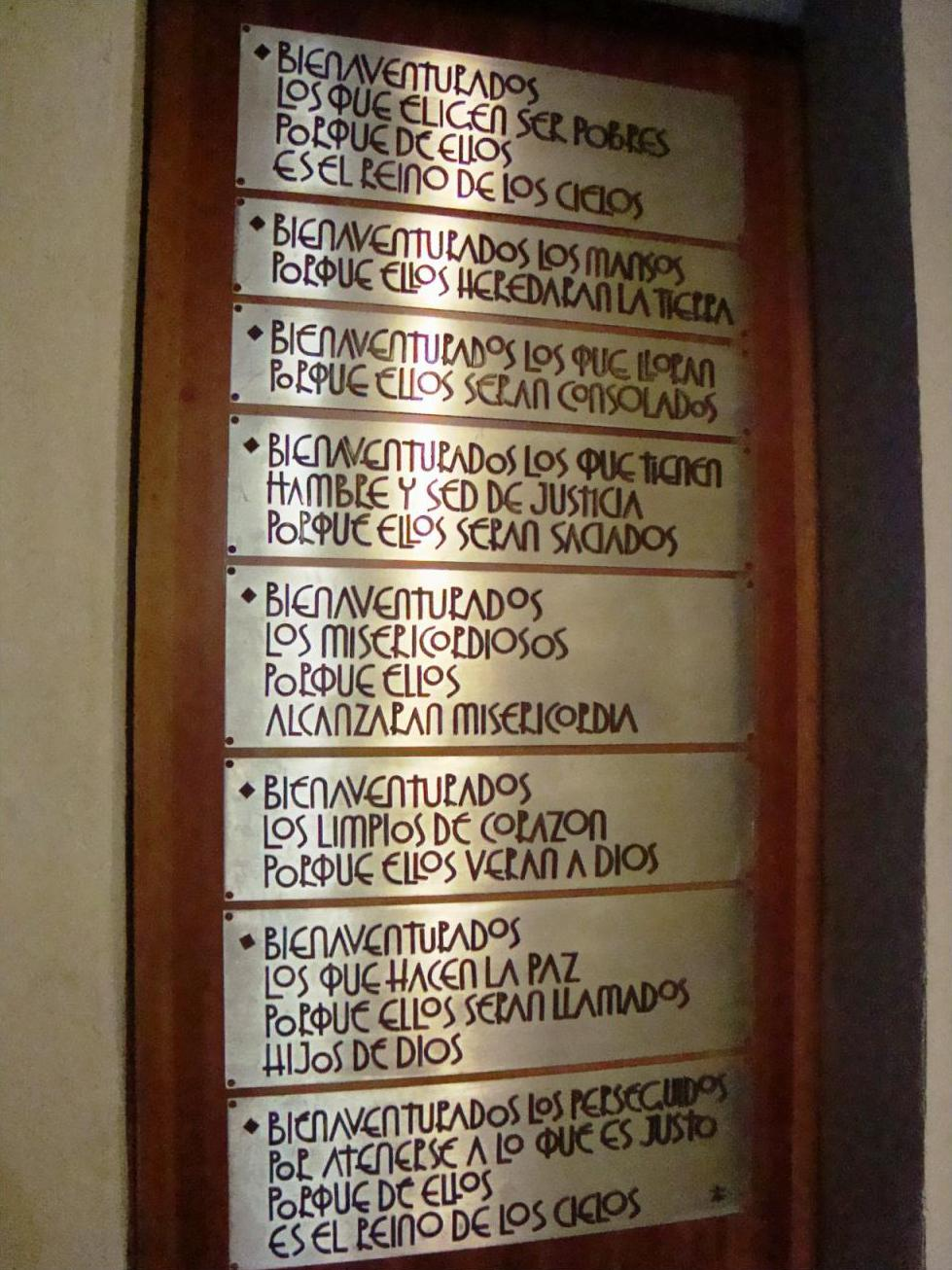
A plaque of the eight Beatitudes at St. Cajetan Church in Mexico City, Mexico

The teachings of the Sermon on the Mount have been a key element of Christian ethics, and for centuries the sermon has acted as a fundamental recipe for the conduct of the followers of Jesus. Various religious and moral thinkers (e.g. Leo Tolstoy and Mahatma Gandhi) have admired its message, and its teachings were a major component of the nonviolent 1954-1968 American civil rights movement and one of the main sources of Christian pacifism.

In the 5th century, Saint Augustine began his book Our Lord's Sermon on the Mount by stating:

If anyone will piously and soberly consider the sermon which our Lord Jesus Christ spoke on the mount, as we read it in the Gospel according to Matthew, I think that he will find in it, so far as regards the highest morals, a perfect standard of the Christian life.

The last verse of chapter 5 of Matthew (Matthew 5:48) is a focal point of the Sermon that summarizes its teachings by advising the disciples to seek τέλειος (teleios). The Greek word is used to refer to perfection, completeness, or wholeness, and also implies an end, purpose, or destination. Nolland relates teleios to its translation in the Septuagint of the Hebrew tāmîm ("whole", "unblemished"). On this reading, the verse calls for wholehearted, undivided commitment to the will of God as expounded in the antitheses, and makes no claim that flawlessness is attainable.

The teachings of the sermon are often referred to as the "Ethics of the Kingdom": they place a high level of emphasis on "purity of the heart" and embody the basic standard of Christian righteousness.

=== Theological structure ===
The theological structure of the Sermon on the Mount is widely discussed. One group of theologians ranging from Saint Augustine in the 5th century to Michael Goulder in the 20th century, see the Beatitudes as the central element of the Sermon. Others such as Günther Bornkamm see the Sermon arranged around the Lord's Prayer, while Daniel Patte, closely followed by Ulrich Luz, see a chiastic structure in the sermon. Dale Allison and Glen Stassen have proposed a structure based on triads. Jack Kingsbury and Hans Dieter Betz see the sermon as composed of theological themes, e.g. righteousness or way of life.

=== Extension ===
The Catechism of the Catholic Church suggests that "it is fitting to add [to the Sermon on the Mount] the moral catechesis of the apostolic teachings, such as Romans 12-15, 1 Corinthians 12-13, Colossians 3-4, Ephesians 4-5, etc."

== Interpretation ==
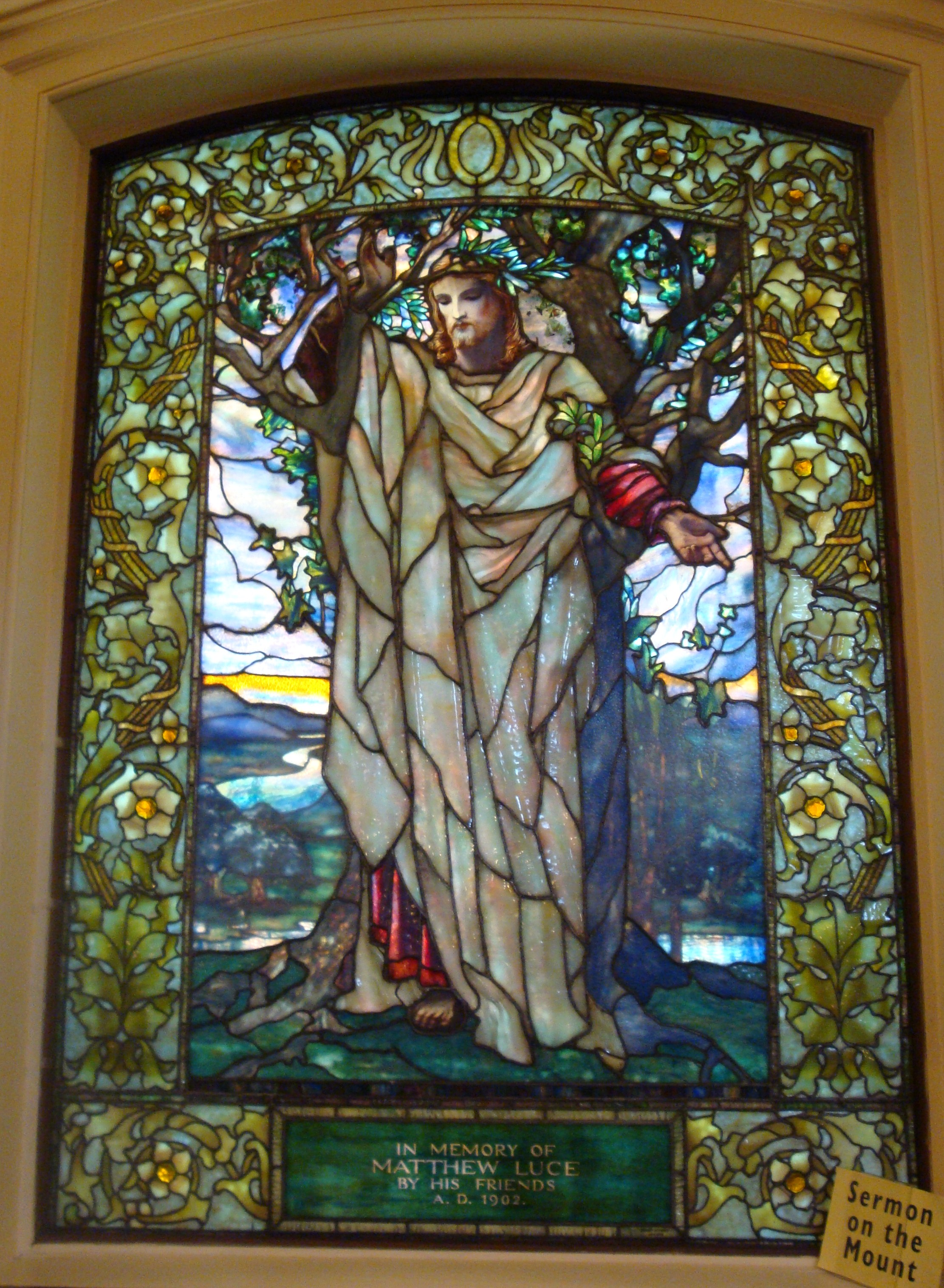
The Sermon of the Mount depicted by Louis Comfort Tiffany in a stained glass window at Arlington Street Church in Boston

The sermon has been interpreted in many different ways within the Christian tradition through the centuries. Interpretations differ over whether the demands can be kept in the present age, who is obliged to keep them, and the sphere of life and point in salvation history to which they apply; how literally particular sayings are meant is one question among these. Craig S. Keener finds at least 36 different interpretations and Bauman 66. Biblical scholar Harvey K. McArthur lists 12 basic schools of thought:

1. The Absolutist View interprets the Sermon on the Mount as conveying an unambiguous message regarding moral perfection and enduring persecution. For instance, Anabaptists claim to adhere to a literal interpretation, directly applying the sermon's teachings to their lives.
2. Other Christians have addressed the issue by Modifying the Text of the sermon. In antiquity, this modification was sometimes achieved through the alteration of the text itself to render it more acceptable. For example, some early scribes altered Matthew 5:22, changing the phrase "whosoever is angry with his brother shall be in danger of the judgment" to the softened, "whosoever is angry with his brother without a cause shall be in danger of the judgment." Similarly, the phrase "Love your enemies" was changed to "Pray for your enemies," among other revisions.
3. The Hyperbole View asserts that certain statements in the sermon are to be understood as exaggerations. A prominent example is Matthew 5:29–30, where believers are commanded to gouge out their eyes and cut off their hands if these body parts lead them to sin. However, there is some debate regarding which parts of the sermon should be interpreted figuratively.
4. The General Principles View maintains that Jesus did not provide specific instructions but rather offered broad guidelines for behavior, outlining general principles of conduct.
5. The Double Standard View, widely accepted in the Middle Ages, posits that the teachings of the sermon can be divided into general precepts and specific counsels. According to this view, the precepts apply to the broader population, while the specific counsels are directed toward a select group, typically the pious few. This view reserves a "higher ethic" for clergy, especially those in monastic orders.
6. The Two Realms View, associated with the theology of Martin Luther, separates the world into the religious and secular realms. According to this perspective, the sermon applies exclusively to the spiritual realm. In the secular world, individuals' obligations to family, employers, and society may require compromises. For instance, a judge may be compelled to sentence a criminal to death, but inwardly, he should grieve for the criminal's fate.
7. The Analogy of Scripture View suggests that the more stringent precepts of the sermon are moderated by other parts of the New Testament. For instance, both the Old and New Testaments hold that all people sin, so the command to "be perfect" cannot be taken literally, and even Jesus himself did not always obey the command to refrain from being angry with one's brother.
8. The notion of Attitudes not Acts asserts that, while complete adherence to the Sermon on the Mount is unattainable, the focus should be placed on one's internal attitude rather than external actions.
9. The Interim Ethic View holds that Jesus was convinced the world would end imminently, thus rendering material well-being irrelevant. In this view, survival in the world did not matter, as the end times would render earthly concerns obsolete. Although it was known earlier, Albert Schweitzer is particularly associated with popularizing this view.
10. The Unconditional Divine Will View, presented by Martin Dibelius, posits that while the ethical teachings of the sermon are absolute and unyielding, the fallen state of the world makes it impossible for humans to fully live according to them. Despite this, humans are still bound to strive towards this ideal, with the realization of the Kingdom of Heaven expected to bring fulfillment of these teachings.
11. The Repentance View holds that Jesus knew that the precepts in his sermon were unattainable, and that it was meant to stimulate repentance and faith in the Gospel, which teaches that we are saved not by works of righteousness, but faith in the atoning death and resurrection of Jesus.
12. Another Eschatological View is that of modern dispensationalism, first developed by the Plymouth Brethren, which divides human history into a series of ages or dispensations. According to this view, while the teachings of the sermon may be unattainable in the current age, they will become a prerequisite for salvation in the future Millennium (see inaugurated eschatology).

Blomberg identifies an inaugurated-kingdom interpretation popularized by George Eldon Ladd as a widespread consensus 21st century scholars. On this reading, the kingdom is already present but will only be fully realised at Christ's return. Therefore, sermon's ethics apply to believers now while remaining only partially attainable in the present age.

A further line of interpretation concerns the authority that the sermon attributes to Jesus. In A Rabbi Talks with Jesus (1993), the Jewish scholar Jacob Neusner imagines himself among the sermon's first hearers and declines to follow Jesus on the ground that the sermon places Jesus himself where the Torah stood. According to Neusner, "Christ now stands on the mountain, he now takes the place of the Torah", and "only God can demand of me what Jesus is asking". Joseph Ratzinger (Pope Benedict XVI) responds at length in Jesus of Nazareth (2007). He accepts Neusner's analysis: "Jesus understands himself as the Torah", so that the sermon's demands rest on his divine authority." Ratzinger also grants that the sermon supplies no political programme, since it "cannot serve as a foundation for a state and a social order".

== Comparison with the Sermon on the Plain ==
While Matthew groups Jesus's teachings into sets of similar material, the same material is scattered when found in Luke. The Sermon on the Mount may be compared with the similar but shorter Sermon on the Plain as recounted by the Gospel of Luke (Luke 6:17–49), which occurs at the same moment in Luke's narrative, and also features Jesus heading up a mountain, but giving the sermon on the way down at a level spot. Some scholars believe that they are the same sermon, while others hold that Jesus frequently preached similar themes in different places.

== See also ==
- Gospel harmony
- Jesus in Christianity
- Life of Jesus in the New Testament
- The Kingdom of God Is Within You, 1894 Leo Tolstoy book

Sermon on the Mount Life of Jesus: Sermon on the Mount or on the Plain
Preceded by Commissioning of the Twelve Apostles	New Testament Events	Succeeded by Widow's Son at Nain Raised Miracles of Jesus
