= Five Discourses of Matthew =

Five specific speeches of Jesus in the Gospel of Matthew

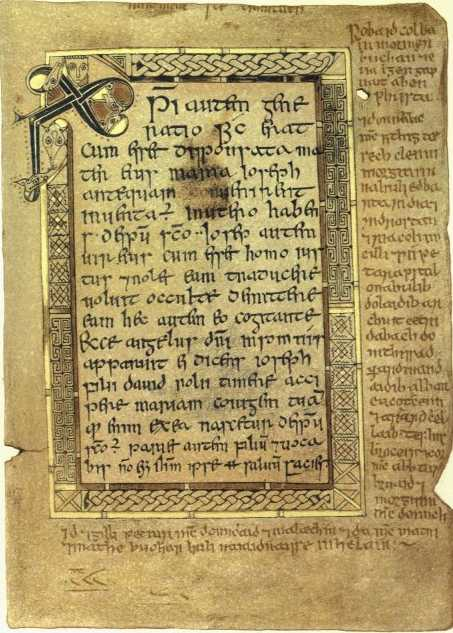
The Gospel of Matthew from the Book of Deer, 10th century

In Christianity, the term Five Discourses of Matthew refers to five specific discourses by Jesus within the Gospel of Matthew.

The five discourses are listed as the following: the Sermon on the Mount, the Mission Discourse, the Parabolic Discourse, the Discourse on the Church, and the Olivet Discourse.

Each of the discourses has a shorter parallel in the Gospel of Mark or the Gospel of Luke.

== Structure ==
Biblical scholars generally agree on the existence of the five separate discourses, although discussions and differences of opinion exist about specific details. There are occurrences of the closing formula "when Jesus had finished speaking": 7:28, 11:1, 13:53, 19:1, and 26:1. Most scholars consider chapters 23 to 25 to be the final discourse, but some take it to be merely 24 and 25.

Beginning with B. W. Bacon in the early 20th century, some scholars have argued that there are five corresponding narratives (plus a prologue and an epilogue) in Matthew that pair with the discourses, but others (e.g. Jack Kingsbury or Craig Blomberg) see three major segments in Matthew in which the 5 discourses take place.

Blomberg showed how the five-discourse structure can be used to relate the top-level structure of Matthew with Mark, Luke and John. In his mapping Chapter 13 of Matthew is its centre, as is Mark 8:30 and the beginning of Chapter 12 of John. He then separates Luke into three parts by 9:51 and 18:14.

Each of the discourses has shorter parallel passages in the Gospel of Mark and the Gospel of Luke. The first discourse relates to Luke 6:20-49. The second discourse relates to Mark 6:7-13 as well as Luke 9:1-6 and Luke 10:1-12. The corresponding unit for the third discourse is Mark 4:3-34. The fourth discourse relates to Mark 9:35-48 and the final discourse to Luke 21:5-36 and Mark 13:5-37.

A number of scholars have compared the five discourses to the five books of the Pentateuch, but most contemporary scholars reject the idea of an intentional parallel.

== The five discourses ==
=== The first discourse ===
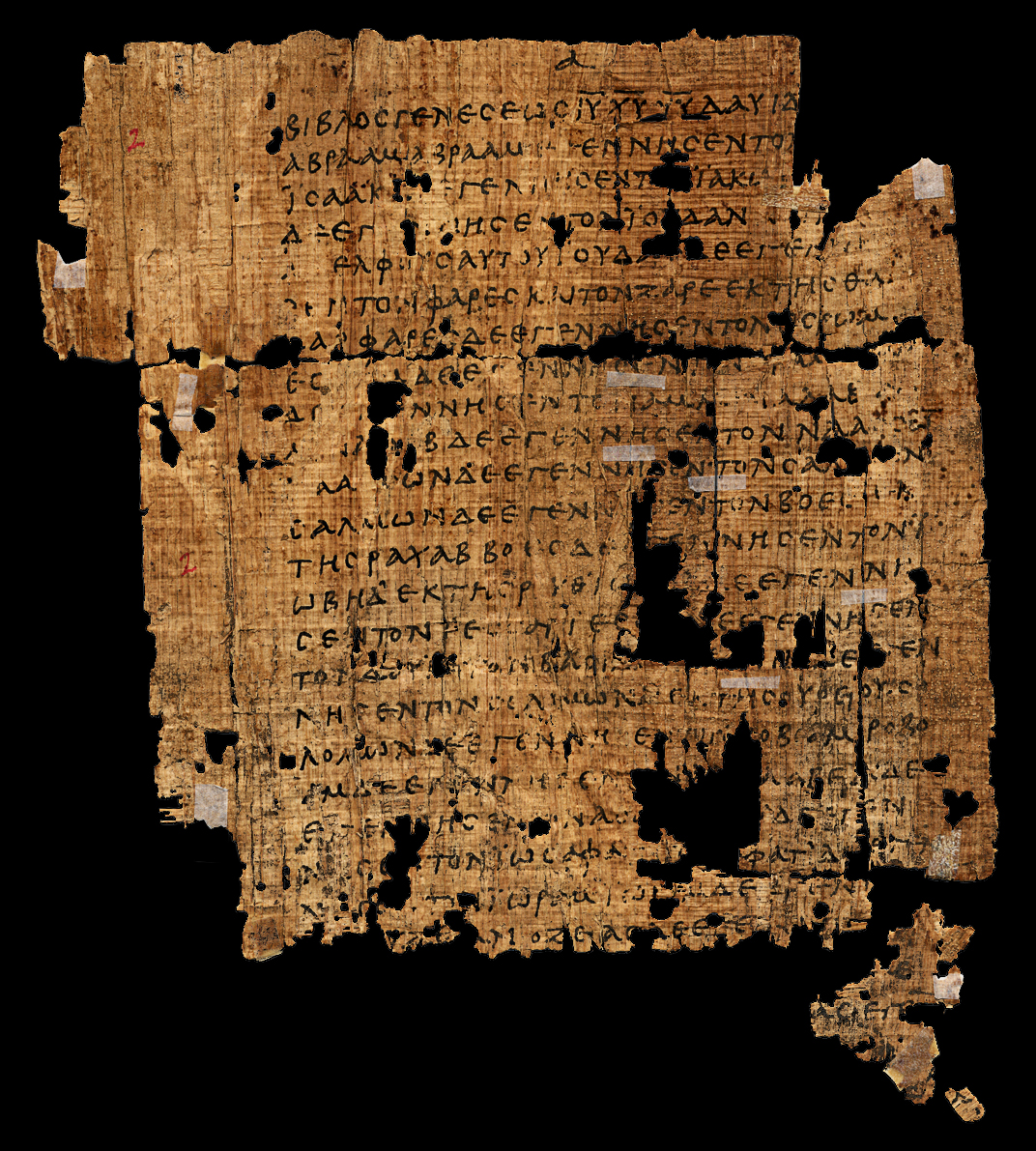
A page from Matthew, from Papyrus 1, c. 250

The first discourse (Matthew 5–7) is called the Sermon on the Mount and is one of the best known and most quoted parts of the New Testament. It includes the Beatitudes, the Lord's Prayer and the Golden Rule. To most believers in Jesus, the Sermon on the Mount contains the central tenets of Christian discipleship. The Beatitudes are a key element of this sermon, and are often expressed as a set of blessings. Jesus presents the Beatitudes as a list of those he considered "blessed," or "fortunate," (due to his arrival and their subsequent invitation into the "Kingdom of Heaven"), as opposed to Ben Sira's list of "blessed" peoples (Ben Sira 25:7-11). The Beatitudes work as a welcoming statement to this group of people, and as an introduction to the sermon.

=== The second discourse ===
The second discourse in Matthew 10 provides instructions to the Twelve Apostles and is sometimes called the Mission Discourse or the Missionary Discourse or the Little Commission in contrast to the Great Commission. This discourse is directed to the twelve apostles who are named in Matthew 10:2-3. In the discourse Jesus advises them how to travel from city to city, carry no belongings and to preach only to Israelite communities. He tells them to be wary of opposition, but have no fear for they will be told what to say to defend themselves when needed: "For it is not ye that speak, but the Spirit of your Father which speaketh in you.", as also stated similarly in Luke 12:12.

=== The third discourse ===
The third discourse in Matthew 13 (verses 1-52) provides several parables for the Kingdom of Heaven and is often called the Parabolic Discourse. The first part of this discourse, in Matthew 13:1-35 takes place outside when Jesus leaves a house and sits near the Lake to address the disciples as well as the multitudes of people who have gathered to hear him. This part includes the parables of the Sower, the Tares, the Mustard Seed and the Leaven. In the second part Jesus goes back inside the house and addresses the disciples. This part includes the parables of the Hidden Treasure, the Pearl and Drawing in the Net.

=== The fourth discourse ===
The fourth discourse in Matthew 18 is often called the Discourse on the Church. It includes the parables of The Lost Sheep and The Unforgiving Servant which also refer to the Kingdom of Heaven. The general theme of the discourse is the anticipation of a future community of followers, and the role of his apostles in leading it. Addressing his apostles in 18:18, Jesus states: "what things soever ye shall bind on earth shall be bound in heaven; and what things soever ye shall loose on earth shall be loosed in heaven". This power is first given to Peter in chapter 16 after Peter confesses that Jesus is the "son of the living God". In addition to the powers of binding and loosing, Peter is given the keys to the kingdom of heaven, and is sometimes considered the "rock" on which Christ built his Church. The discourse emphasizes the importance of humility and self-sacrifice as the high virtues within the anticipated community. It teaches that in the Kingdom of God, it is childlike humility that matters, not social prominence and clout.

=== The fifth discourse ===
Although assessments of its scope vary, the final discourse can be taken to include Matthew 23, 24, and 25. Jason Hood outlines the academic discussion about the extent of the last discourse.

Matthew 24 is usually called the Olivet Discourse, because it was given on the Mount of Olives; it is also referred to as the Discourse on the End Times. The discourse corresponds to Mark 13 and Luke 21 and is mostly about judgment and the expected conduct of the followers of Jesus, and the need for vigilance by the followers in view of the coming judgment. The discourse is prompted by a question the disciples ask about the "end of the age" (end times or end of this world and beginning of the world to come), and receives the longest response provided by Jesus in the New Testament. The discourse is generally viewed as referring both to the coming destruction of the Temple in Jerusalem, as well as the End Times and Second Coming of Christ, but the many scholarly opinions about the overlap of these two issues, and exactly which verses refer to which event remain divided and complex.

== See also ==
- Farewell Discourse
- Jesus in Christianity
- Life of Jesus in the New Testament
- Parables of Jesus
