= Acts of Peter and the Twelve =

c. 4th century Christian text

The Acts of Peter and the Twelve or the Acts of Peter and the Twelve Apostles is a Christian text from about the 4th century. It is the first treatise in Codex VI of the Nag Hammadi library texts, taking up pages 1–12 of the codex's 78 pages. The writing extends the Parable of the Pearl from Matthew 13:45–46. In the text, Peter the Apostle meets a pearl merchant named Lithargoel, who is later revealed to be Jesus. Jesus commands the apostles to care for the poor.

== History ==
Before its discovery in Nag Hammadi, Egypt in 1945, the text was completely unknown. The discovered text is written in Coptic and was likely created in c. 300–350 AD. The retention of two Greek vocatives in the text, however, is evidence that the tractate is a translation of a Greek original. Scholars give a general estimate for the date of the original as the 2nd or 3rd century AD, but its final redaction may have been written as late as 367 AD.

The first four sheets of papyrus, containing pages 1–8, have some damage to the text at the top. Thus, the introductory lines are unclear. On the other two sheets of papyrus, containing pages 9–12, the text is mostly intact.

Along with the rest of the works in the Nag Hammadi library, the text was translated into English and published in The Nag Hammadi Library in English in 1977. The publication was part of the work of the Coptic Gnostic Library Project, which began in 1966 at Claremont Graduate University. Douglas M. Parrott and R. McL. Wilson translated the text to English.

The text has also been translated into French, German, and Norwegian.

=== Summary ===
The apostles arrive at a small city called Habitation and Peter seeks lodging. They meet a man who introduces himself as Lithargoel, meaning "the light, gazelle-like stone". Lithargoel warns Peter that the road is very dangerous and the apostles must abandon everything they have and fast to travel it. Peter discovers that the city is named Habitation because those who endure the trials and difficulties of the storms will inhabit the city and be included in the kingdom of heaven. Peter and the apostles forsake everything as Lithargoel instructed and evade the hardships successfully. They rest at the city gate and talk about the faith.

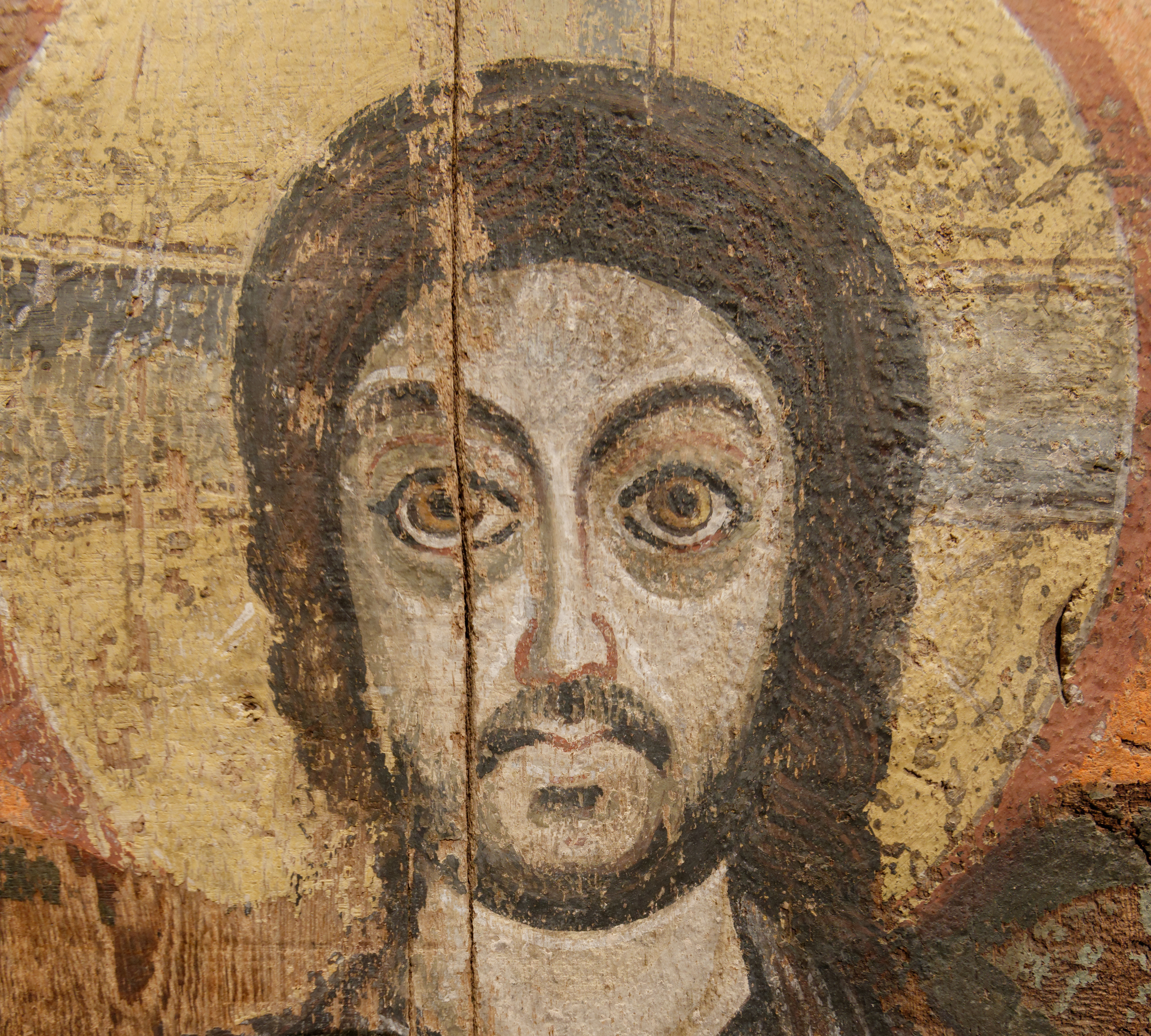
Depiction of Christ from the 8th-century Icon of Christ and Abbot Mena, a sample of early Coptic art

Lithargoel changes his appearance to a physician. Peter is frightened when the physician addresses him by his name, but Peter then recognizes him as Jesus Christ. The apostles worship him and pledge to do as he wishes. Jesus commands them to go back to the city of Habitation to teach and heal all those who have believed in his name. Jesus explains that physicians of souls heal the heart. Jesus also tells the apostles not to dine with the rich men of the city who do not acknowledge him and to judge them with uprightness so that their ministry may be glorified and his name may be glorified in the churches. The apostles worship the Lord Jesus and he departs from them in peace.

== Analysis ==
Since the narrative voice shifts between first and third person, scholars have debated whether it is the work of multiple authors or simply literary technique. Theologian Andrea L. Molinari argues that the text contains five voice shifts and three separate sources, but a shift in voice does not necessarily entail a change of source. Citing analyses by New Testament scholar Vernon K. Robbins and Stephen J. Patterson, Molinari notes that in the narration of ancient sea-voyage stories, it was common to shift to first-person plural voice. But the text also has voice shifts when the narrative perspective changes. Molinari concludes that the author of the text added his own material to the end of two other sources. Molinari believes that the entirety of the text up to the point that the physician quickly leaves and comes back (1.1–9.1) is from a single source. He believes that the post-resurrection appearance (9.1–9.29) is from a second source. The remainder of the text (9.30–12.19), in Molinari's view, is the author's attempt to link the other two sources with his own beliefs about pastoral ministry.

Academic István Czachesz argues that the text is an allegory for monasticism and that it came from a Pachomian monastery in 347–367 AD. Czachesz sees parallels between the written Pachomian rules and Lithargoel's warnings about avoiding the dangers of the road. Czachesz believes that the city of Habitation could be symbolic of the monastery, and Lithargoel could represent Pachomius. Furthermore, the themes expressed by Jesus near the end of the text—providing for the poor, healing them, and condemning the rich—match the Pachomian monastic tradition.

Czachesz also finds the explanation for the meaning of Lithargoel's name questionable. He considers it grammatically problematic to simply combine the Greek words for 'stone' and 'light'. He suggests instead that the name comes from the Greek adjective meaning 'forgetful', which is also used in Syriac as a Greek loanword. This change allows Czachesz to theorize that Lithargoel was originally the protagonist of the pearl merchant story, based on similarities to the Hymn of the Pearl. It also allows Czachesz to identify Syria as the origin of the pearl narrative, which was later edited by the Pachomian redactor.

Scholars debate whether the work is Gnostic, since the texts discovered at Nag Hammadi in Egypt were mostly Gnostic writings. Although the text lacks explicitly Gnostic views, its themes could be interpreted as Gnostic. Molinari hypothesizes that the source material of the pearl merchant story contained elaborate Gnostic themes, but Czachesz considers Molinari's Gnostic hypothesis unnecessary.

Religious historian Alicia J. Batten explores thematic affinities between the text and the Epistle of James. She sees the most obvious and significant similarities between the two works as the critique of the rich and the directive to care for the poor. Both works also emphasize endurance, renunciation of the world, and healing both the body and soul. She concludes that although the author does not explicitly cite James, the author may have drawn from ideas in James.
