= Parable of the Pearl =

Biblical story

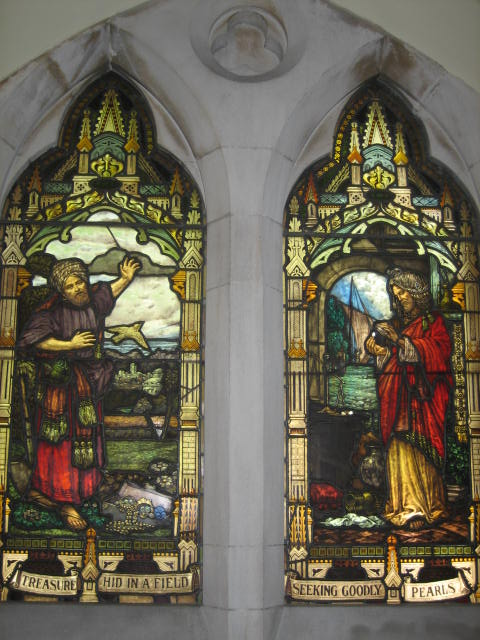
The Parable of the Hidden Treasure (left) paired with the Parable of the Pearl (right) on a stained glass window in Scots' Church, Melbourne

The Parable of the Pearl (also called the Pearl of Great Price) is one of the parables of Jesus Christ. It appears in Matthew 13 and illustrates the great value of the Kingdom of Heaven.

This is the penultimate parable in Matthew 13, coming just before the Parable of the Dragnet. It immediately follows the Parable of the Hidden Treasure, which has a similar theme. It does not appear in the other synoptic gospels, but a version of this parable does appear in the non-canonical Gospel of Thomas, Saying 76. The parable has been depicted by artists such as Domenico Fetti.

The parable reads as follows:

Again, the kingdom of heaven is like unto a merchant man, seeking goodly pearls: Who, when he had found one pearl of great price, went and sold all that he had, and bought it.

— Matthew 13:45-46, King James Version

== Interpretation ==
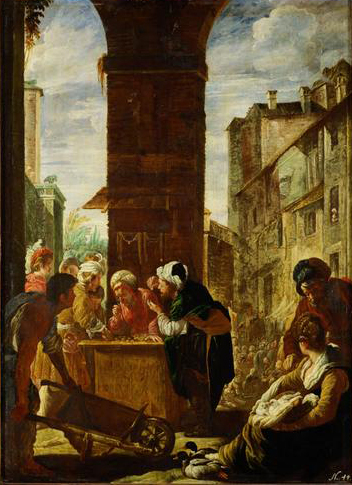
The Pearl of Great Price, by Domenico Fetti, 17th century

This parable is generally interpreted as illustrating the great value of the Kingdom of Heaven. Theologian E. H. Plumptre, in Anglican bishop Charles Ellicott's Commentary, notes that:

"the caprices of luxury in the Roman empire had given a prominence to pearls, as an article of commerce, which they had never had before, and have probably never had since. They, rather than emeralds and sapphires, were the typical instance of all costliest adornments. The story of Cleopatra and the fact that the opening of a new pearl market was one of the alleged motives which led the Emperor Claudius to invade Britain, are indications of the value that was then set on the 'goodly pearls' of the parable."

Theologian John Nolland likewise notes that pearls at that time had a greater value than they do today, and it thus has a similar theme to its partner, the parable of the hidden treasure. Nolland comments that it shares with that parable the notions of "good fortune and demanding action in attaining the kingdom of heaven" but adds in this case the notion of "diligent seeking". The valuable pearl is the "deal of a lifetime" for the merchant in the story. However, those who do not believe in the kingdom of heaven enough to stake their whole future on it are unworthy of the kingdom.

This interpretation of the parable is the inspiration for a number of hymns, including the anonymous Swedish hymn Den Kostliga Pärlan (O That Pearl of Great Price!), which begins:

O that Pearl of great price! have you found it?
Is the Savior supreme in your love?
O consider it well, ere you answer,
As you hope for a welcome above.
Have you given up all for this Treasure?
Have you counted past gains as but loss?
Has your trust in yourself and your merits
Come to naught before Christ and His cross?

A less common interpretation of the parable is that the merchant represents Jesus, and the pearl represents the Christian Church, though that definition is problematic as neither the Christian church nor Christianity existed until after Jesus' death. This interpretation would give the parable a similar theme to that of the Parable of the Lost Sheep, the Lost Coin, and the Prodigal Son. Pope Pius XII used the phrase to describe virginity.

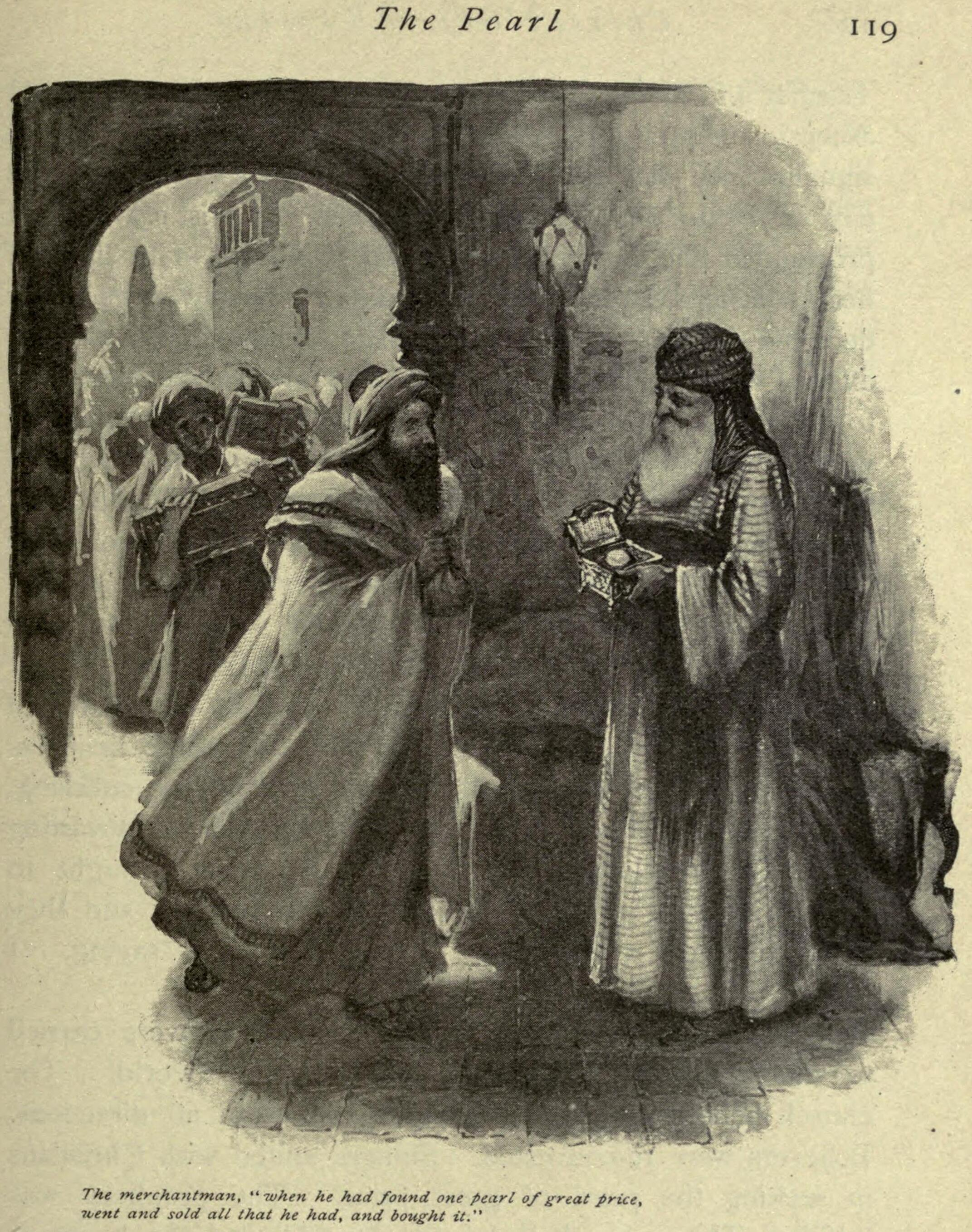
Anonymous, 1900

== Commentary from the Church Fathers ==
John Chrysostom: "The Gospel preaching not only offers manifold gain as a treasure, but is precious as a pearl; wherefore after the parable concerning the treasure, He gives that concerning the pearl. And in preaching, two things are required, namely, to be detached from the business of this life, and to be watchful, which are denoted by this merchantman. Truth moreover is one, and not manifold, and for this reason it is one pearl that is said to be found. And as one who is possessed of a pearl, himself indeed knows of his wealth, but is not known to others, ofttimes concealing it in his hand because of its small bulk, so it is in the preaching of the Gospel; they who possess it know that they are rich, the unbelievers, not knowing of this treasure, know not of our wealth."

Jerome: "By the goodly pearls may be understood the Law and the Prophets. Hear then Marcion and Manichæus; the good pearls are the Law and the Prophets. One pearl, the most precious of all, is the knowledge of the Saviour and the sacrament of His passion and resurrection, which when the merchantman has found, like Paul the Apostle, he straightway despises all the mysteries of the Law and the Prophets and the old observances in which he had lived blameless, counting them as dung that he may win Christ (Phillipians 3:8.) Not that the finding of a new pearl is the condemnation of the old pearls, but that in comparison of that, all other pearls are worthless."

Gregory the Great: "Or by the pearl of price is to be understood the sweetness of the heavenly kingdom, which, he that hath found it, selleth all and buyeth. For he that, as far as is permitted, has had perfect knowledge of the sweetness of the heavenly life, readily leaves all things that he has loved on earth; all that once pleased him among earthly possessions now appears to have lost its beauty, for the splendour of that precious pearl is alone seen in his mind."

Augustine: "Or, A man seeking goodly pearls has found one pearl of great price; that is, he who is seeking good men with whom he may live profitably, finds one alone, Christ Jesus, without sin; or, seeking precepts of life, by aid of which he may dwell righteously among men, finds love of his neighbour, in which one rule, the Apostle says, (Romans 13:9) are comprehended all things; or, seeking good thoughts, he finds that Word in which all things are contained, In the beginning was the Word (John 1:1) which is lustrous with the light of truth, stedfast with the strength of eternity, and throughout like to itself with the beauty of divinity, and when we have penetrated the shell of the flesh, will be confessed as God. But whichever of these three it may be, or if there be anything else that can occur to us, that can be signified under the figure of the one precious pearl, its preciousness is the possession of ourselves, who are not free to possess it unless we despise all things that can be possessed in this world. For having sold our possessions, we receive no other return greater than ourselves, (for while we were involved in such things we were not our own,) that we may again give ourselves for that pearl, not because we are of equal value to that, but because we cannot give anything more."

== Gospel of Thomas ==
A version of the parable appears in the Gnostic Gospel of Thomas (Saying 76):

Jesus said, "The Father's kingdom is like a merchant who had a supply of merchandise and found a pearl. That merchant was prudent; he sold the merchandise and bought the single pearl for himself. So also with you, seek his treasure that is unfailing, that is enduring, where no moth comes to eat and no worm destroys."

— Gospel of Thomas 76, Patterson/Meyer translation

This work's version of the parable of the hidden treasure appears later (Saying 109), rather than immediately preceding, as in Matthew. However, the mention of a treasure in Saying 76 may reflect a source for the Gospel of Thomas in which the parables were adjacent, so that the original pair of parables has been "broken apart, placed in separate contexts, and expanded in a manner characteristic of folklore." In Gnostic thought the pearl may represent Christ or the true self. In the Gnostic Acts of Peter and the Twelve, found with the Gospel of Thomas in the Nag Hammadi library, the travelling pearl merchant Lithargoel is eventually revealed to be Jesus.

== Depictions ==
There have been several depictions of the New Testament parable in art, including works by Domenico Fetti, John Everett Millais and Jan Luyken.

== See also ==
- Five Discourses of Matthew
- Life of Jesus in the New Testament
- Ministry of Jesus
- The Pearl of Great Price - one of the standard works in The Church of Jesus Christ of Latter-day Saints.
