= Parable of Drawing in the Net =

Biblical story

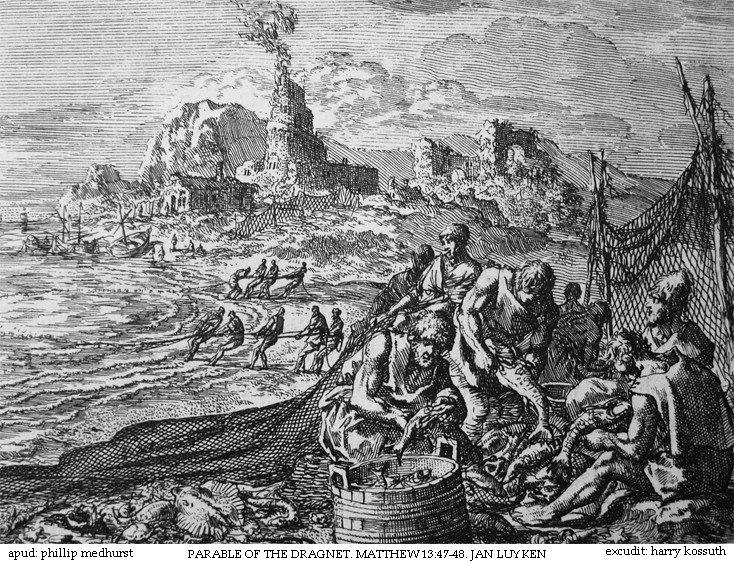
Jan Luyken etching of the parable, Bowyer Bible.

The parable of drawing in the net, also known as the parable of the dragnet, is a Christian parable that appears in the Gospel of Matthew, chapter 13, verses 47–52. The parable refers to the Last Judgment. This parable is the seventh and last in Matthew 13, which began with the Parable of the Sower. It directly follows the Parable of the Pearl, which is about the Kingdom of God. Thus, it links the Kingdom of God with the final judgment—the separation for hell and heaven.

The parable is also found in three non-canonical gospels: by Clement of Alexandria, in the Heliand and the Gospel of Thomas. In the Gospel of Thomas, it is referred to as the Parable of the Fisherman.

== Narrative ==
The parable is as follows:

"Again, the Kingdom of Heaven is like a dragnet, that was cast into the sea, and gathered some fish of every kind, which, when it was filled, they drew up on the beach. They sat down and gathered the good into containers, but the bad they threw away. So will it be at the end of the age. The angels will come forth, and separate the wicked from among the righteous, and will cast them into the furnace of fire. There will be the weeping and the gnashing of teeth."

Jesus said to them, "Have you understood all these things?"

They answered him, "Yes, Lord."

He said to them, "Therefore every scribe who has been made a disciple in the Kingdom of Heaven is like a man who is a householder, who brings out of his treasure new and old things."

— Matthew 13:47–52

== Interpretation ==
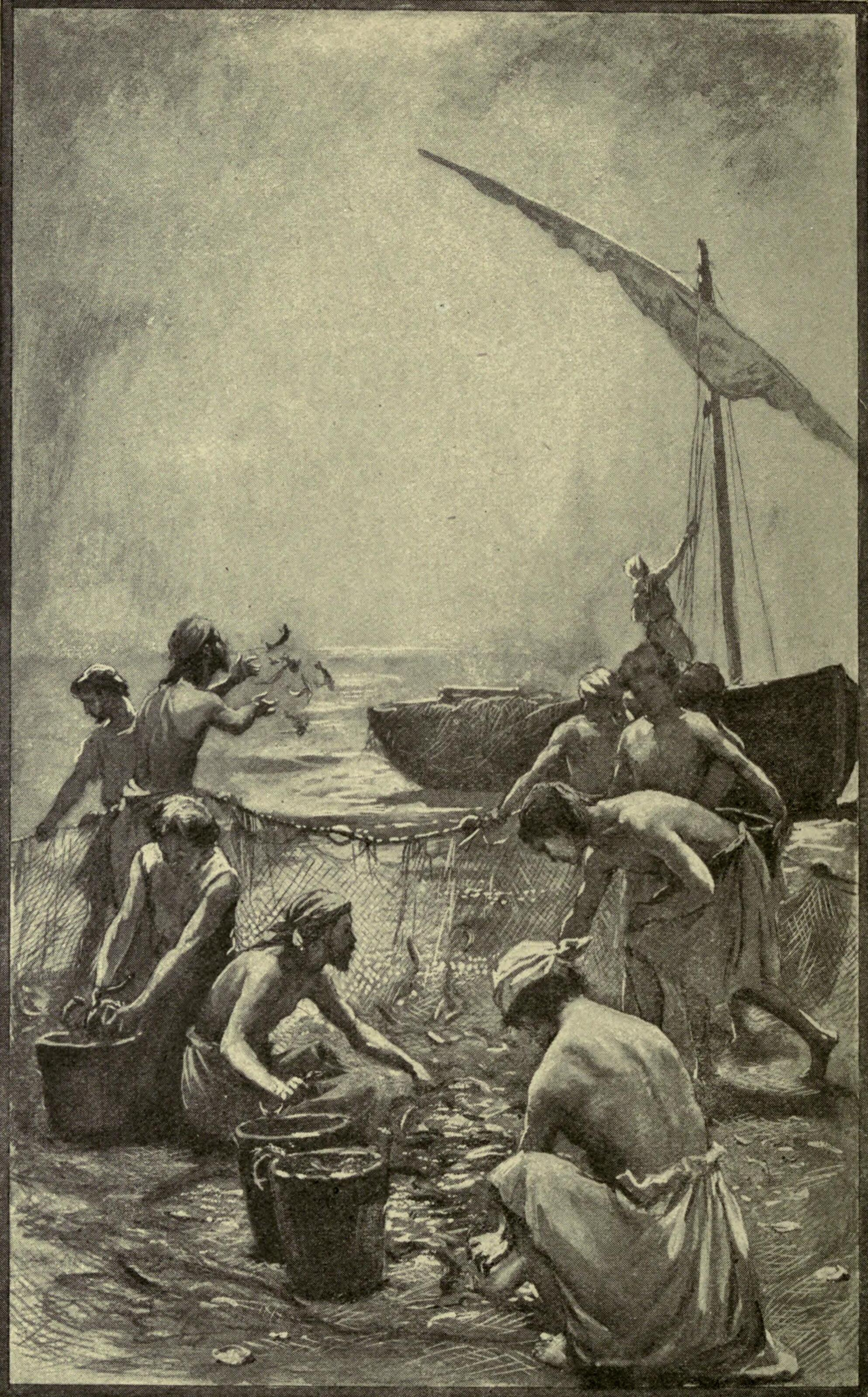
"The Kingdom of heaven is like unto a net that was cast into the sea, and gathered of every kind."

Like the parable of the Tares, earlier in Matthew 13, this parable refers to the final judgment. Here, the imagery is drawn from the separation of edible from inedible fish caught by a net, probably a seine net. One end of the dragnet is held on the shore, the other end is dragged into the sea and returned to the shore. Alternatively, the two ends are held on two boats and then they sweep the sea together.The passage says that "the angels will come and separate the wicked from the righteous" in a similar way to the separation of the tares from the wheat in the parable of the Tares.

Arthur Pink explained that "The 'good' fish represent believers; their being 'gathered' speaks of association together—fellowship; while the 'vessels' tell of separation from the world." First, the fishermen will separate believers (the good fish), and finally angels will take away non-believers to hell.

According to J Duncan M Derrett, Professor of Oriental Laws in the University of London, the parable is about the technique of a mission. He explains:

Just as one may find a darnel in the wheat (Matt. xiii 29), so one will, if one fishes not with an angle but with a dragnet, trawl up many unsuitable items. Selective preaching, one-to-one sessions, such as Jesus himself occasionally had, should not be the normal method of proceeding. Gentiles too would hear his message. The human fish, spread along the beach, would indeed be of every species.

— Derrett 1990, pp. 108–137

Jack Dean Kingsbury, Aubrey Lee Brooks professor of theology at Union Presbyterian Seminary in Richmond, Virginia, asserted that the parable is about the harvest. He explained that the present age is different from the future age, but both stand under the divine ordinance. The church should not attempt to establish a holy community. The association of evil with the righteous is only temporary. In the end, the separation will occur and therefore each Christian must examine himself to avoid being declared evil.

John Chrysostom described this as a "terrible parable", noting that:

And wherein does this differ from the parable of the tares? For there too the one are saved, the other perish; but there, for choosing of wicked doctrines; and those before this again, for not giving heed to His sayings, but these for wickedness of life; who are the most wretched of all, having attained to His knowledge, and being caught, but not even so capable of being saved.

— Chrysostom 1885

Jesus' final comments indicate that "true teachers of the kingdom display the kingdom's treasure for all to see."

Reformer John Calvin interpreted the parable to mean:

Christ informs us, that a mixture of the good and the bad must be patiently endured till the end of the world; because, till that time, a true and perfect restoration of the Church will not take place. Again, he warns us, that it is not enough, and—what is more—than it is of little consequence to us, to be gathered into the fold, unless we are his true and chosen sheep...[and] that [disciples] might communicate to others what they had received. In this way [Christ] whets and excites their minds more and more to desire instruction. He says that teachers are like householders, who do not only care about their own food, but have a store laid up for the nourishment of others; and who do not live at ease as to the passing day, but make provision for a future and distant period. The meaning, therefore, is, that the teachers of the Church ought to be prepared by long study for giving to the people, as out of a storehouse, a variety of instruction concerning the word of God, as the necessity of the case may require.

— Calvin 1845, pp. 130-

William Barclay elaborated that "[The parable] lays it down that there must be no selectiveness in the preaching of the gospel. To us, that is something of a commonplace... But to the ancient world, this was an amazing thing. The ancient world everywhere was a world of barriers and of contempt."

The Parable of the Scribes at the end is generally regarded as part of the parable. But some scholars consider it separate, hence, making up eight—not seven—parables in Matthew 13.

== Commentary from the Church Fathers ==
Chrysostom: "In the foregoing parables He has commended the Gospel preaching; now, that we may not trust in preaching only, nor think that faith alone is sufficient for our salvation, He adds another fearful parable, saying, Again, the kingdom of heaven is like unto a net cast into the sea."

Jerome: "In fulfilment of that prophecy of Jeremiah who said, I will send unto you many fishers, (Jer. 6:16.) when Peter and Andrew, James and John, heard the words, Follow me, I will make you fishers of men, they put together a net for themselves formed of the Old and New Testaments, and cast it into the sea of this world, and that remains spread until this day, taking up out of the salt and bitter and whirlpools whatever falls into it, that is good men and bad; and this is that He adds, And gathered of every kind."

Gregory the Great: "Or otherwise; The Holy Church is likened to a net, because it is given into the hands of fishers, and by it each man is drawn into the heavenly kingdom out of the waves of this present world, that he should not be drowned in the depth of eternal death. This net gathers of every kind of fishes, because the wise and the foolish, the free and the slave, the rich and the poor, the strong and the weak, are called to forgiveness of sin; it is then fully filled when in the end of all things the sum of the human race is completed; as it follows, Which, when it was filled, they drew out, and sitting down on the shore gathered the good into vessels, but the bad they cast away. For as the sea signifies the world, so the seashore signifies the end of the world; and as the good are gathered into vessels, but the bad cast away, so each man is received into eternal abodes, while the reprobate having lost the light of the inward kingdom are cast forth into outer darkness. But now the net of faith holds good and bad mingled together in one; but the shore shall discover what the net of the Church has brought to land."

Jerome: "For when the net shall be drawn to the shore, then shall be shown the true test for separating the fishes."

Chrysostom: "Wherein does this parable differ from the parable of the tares? There, as here, some perish and some are saved; but there, because of their heresy of evil dogmas; in the first parable of the sower, because of their not attending to what was spoken; here, because of their evil life, because of which, though drawn by the net, that is, enjoying the knowledge of God, they cannot be saved. And when you hear that the wicked are cast away, that you may not suppose that this punishment may be risked, He adds an exposition showing its severity, saying, Thus shall it be in the end of the world; the angels shall come forth and sever the wicked from among the just, and shall cast them into the furnace of fire, there shall be wailing and gnashing of teeth. Though He elsewhere declares, that He shall separate them as a shepherd separates the sheep from the goats; He here declares, that the Angels shall do it, as also in the parable of the tares."

Gregory the Great: "To fear becomes us here, rather than to expound for the torments of sinners are pronounced in plain terms, that none might plead his ignorance, should eternal punishment be threatened in obscure sayings."

Jerome: "For when the end of the world shall be come, then shall be shown the true test of separating the fishes, and as in a sheltered harbour the good shall be sent into the vessels of heavenly abodes, but the flame of hell shall seize the wicked to be dried up and withered."

== Non-canonical version ==
The Parable of the Dragnet is also found in the writings of Clement of Alexandria (c. 150-215 CE), in the Heliand (9th-century CE poem) and the Gospel of Thomas. The storylines are similar but with slight variations. Clement of Alexandria wrote:

"The kingdom of heaven is like a man who cast his net into the sea."

In the Heliand it is written:

"Also its [the kingdom of heaven] works is like that a man casts a net into the sea, a fishing net into the flood."

According to the Gospel of Thomas (Saying 8):

"And he said: Man is like a wise fisherman who cast his net into the sea; he drew it up from the sea full of small fish; among them, he found a large good fish, the wise fisherman; he threw all the small fish into the sea, he chose the large fish without difficulty. He who has ears to hear, let him hear!"

== See also ==
- Five Discourses of Matthew
- Life of Jesus in the New Testament
- Ministry of Jesus
