= Parable of the Hidden Treasure =

Parable taught by Jesus of Nazareth according to the Christian Gospel of Matthew

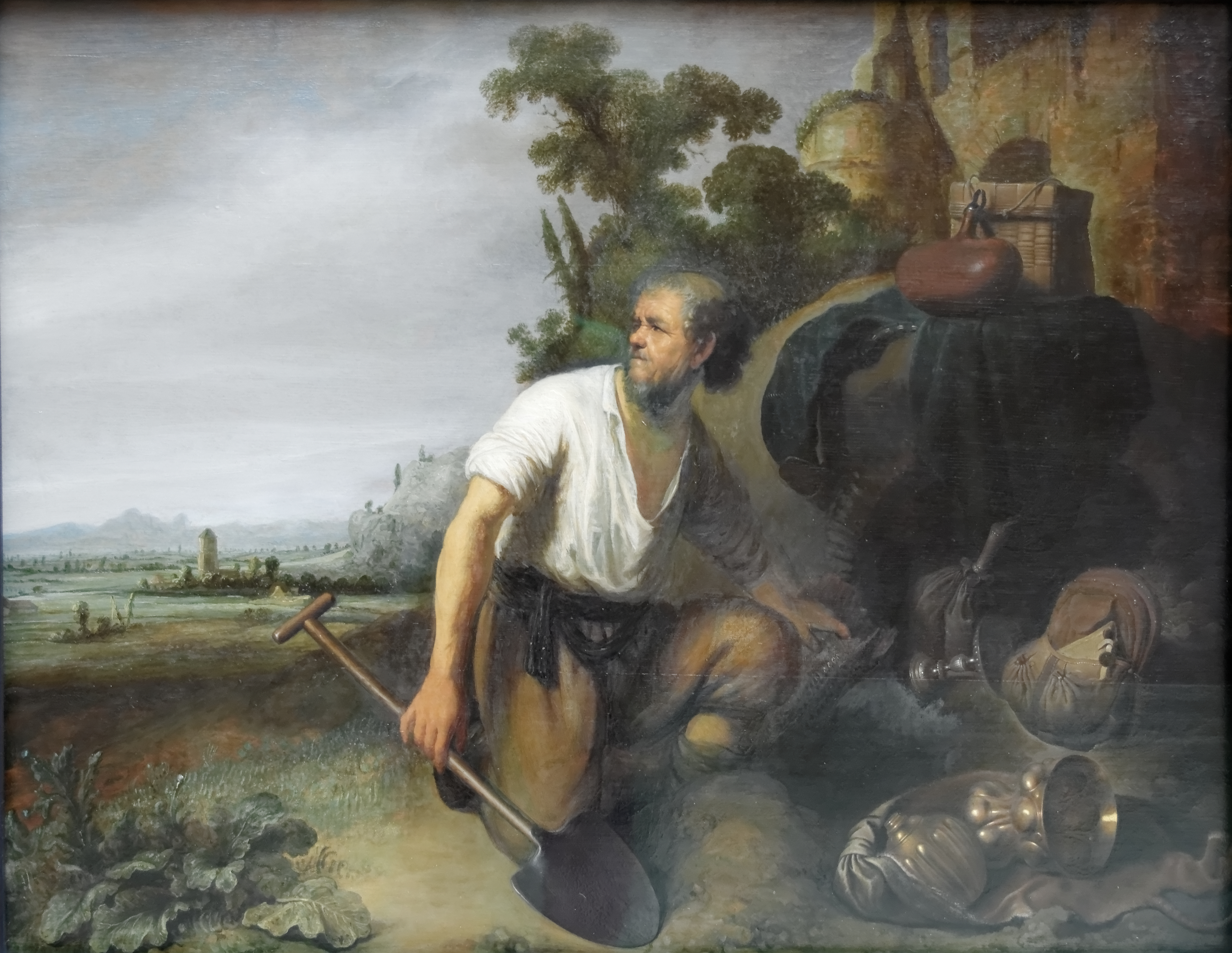
Parable of the Hidden Treasure by Rembrandt (c. 1630).

The Parable of the Hidden Treasure is a parable of Jesus which appears in Matthew 13:44 and illustrates the great value of the Kingdom of Heaven. It immediately precedes the parable of the pearl, which has a similar theme. The parable has been depicted by artists such as Rembrandt.

== Narrative ==
The brief parable of the hidden treasure is as follows:

" Now Again, the Kingdom of Heaven is like a treasure hidden in the field, which a man found, and hid. In his joy, he goes and sells all that he has, and buys that field."

— Matthew 13:44, World English Bible

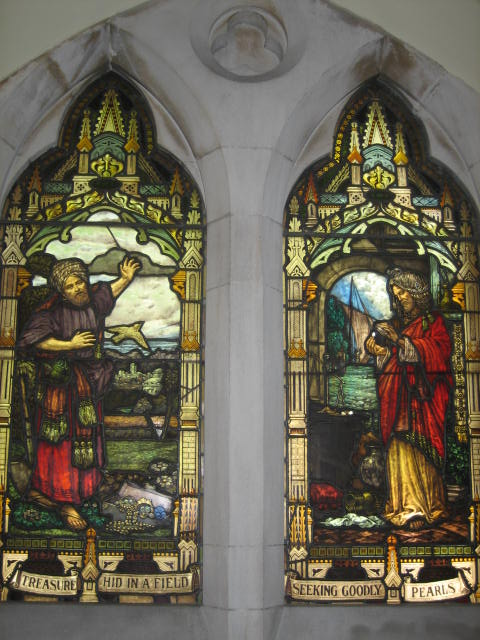
A depiction of this parable (left) paired with that of the pearl (right) on a stained glass window in Scots' Church, Melbourne.

The setting presupposes that someone has buried a treasure. The current owner of the field is unaware of its existence. The finder is unable to conveniently extract it unless he buys the field. For a peasant, such a discovery of treasure represented the "ultimate dream."

== Interpretation ==
This parable is interpreted as illustrating the great value of the Kingdom of Heaven and thus has a similar theme to the parable of the pearl. John Nolland comments that the good fortune reflected in the "finding" reflects a "special privilege," and a source of joy, but also reflects a challenge, just as the man in the parable gives up all that he has in order to lay claim to the greater treasure he has found.

John Calvin writes of this parable:

The first two of these parables are intended to instruct believers to prefer the Kingdom of heaven to the whole world, and therefore to deny themselves and all the desires of the flesh, that nothing may prevent them from obtaining so valuable a possession. We are greatly in need of such a warning; for we are so captivated by the allurements of the world, that eternal life fades from our view; and in consequence of our carnality, the spiritual graces of God are far from being held by us in the estimation which they deserve.

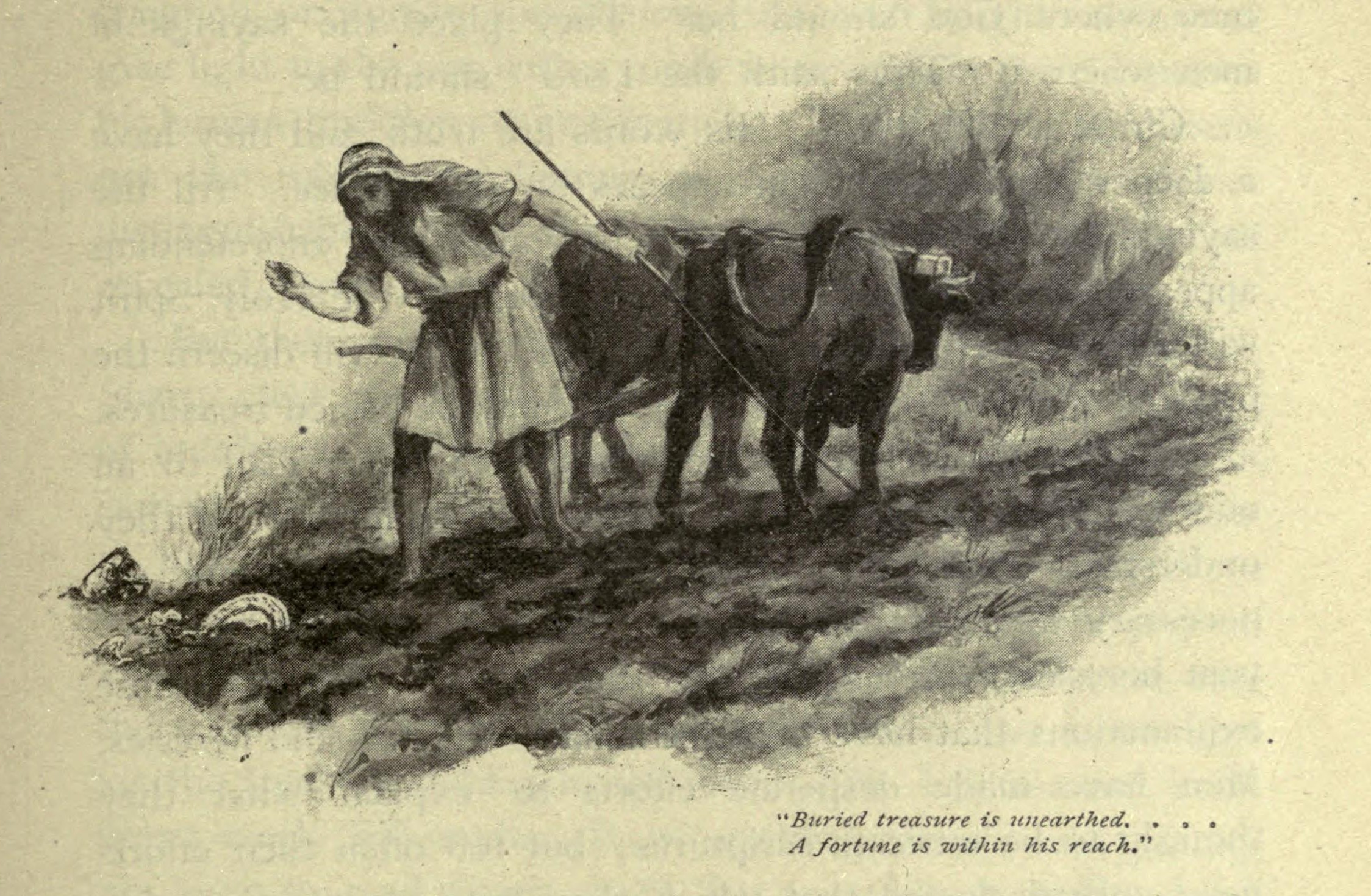
Buried treasure is unearthed; a fortune is within his reach.

The hidden nature of the treasure may indicate that the Kingdom of Heaven "is not yet revealed to everyone." Other interpretations of the parable exist, in which the treasure represents Israel or the Church. In Thomas Aquinas' Catena Aurea, he compiles the comments of some of the Church Fathers on this passage, who point out that like the treasure hidden in the field, the Gospel comes without cost and is open to all – but to truly possess heavenly riches, one must be willing to give up the world to buy it. The Fathers also identify that the field in which the treasure is hidden is the discipline of heavenly learning:

this, when a man finds, he hides, in order that he may preserve it; for zeal and affections heavenward it is not enough that we protect from evil spirits, if we do not protect from human praises. For in this present life we are in the war which leads to our country, and evil spirits as robbers beset us in our journey. Those therefore who carry their treasure openly, they seek to plunder in the way. When I say this; I do not mean that our neighbors should not see our works, but that in what we do, we should not seek praise from without. The kingdom of heaven is therefore compared to things of earth, that the mind may rise from things familiar to things unknown, and may learn to love the unknown by that which it knows is loved when known It follows, And for joy thereof he goes and sells all that he has, and buys that field. He it is that sells all he, has and buys the field, who, renouncing fleshly delights tramples upon all his worldly desires in his anxiety for the heavenly discipline.

New Testament scholar Adolf Jülicher identifies three parts to parables or similitudes (extended similes or metaphors): the picture part, the reality part, and the point of comparison (tertium comparationis). In this instance, the picture part is the hidden treasure, the reality part is God's kingdom, and the point of comparison is the inestimable value of the kingdom. In light of previous parables in Matthew where God or Jesus acts on behalf of his church, Lutheran theologian David P. Scaer understands the treasure in the field to be humanity, and the one purchasing the field to be Christ. Thus, as the man in the parable sells all that he has to buy the field, so Christ gives up his life in order to redeem humanity.

== Commentary from the Church Fathers ==
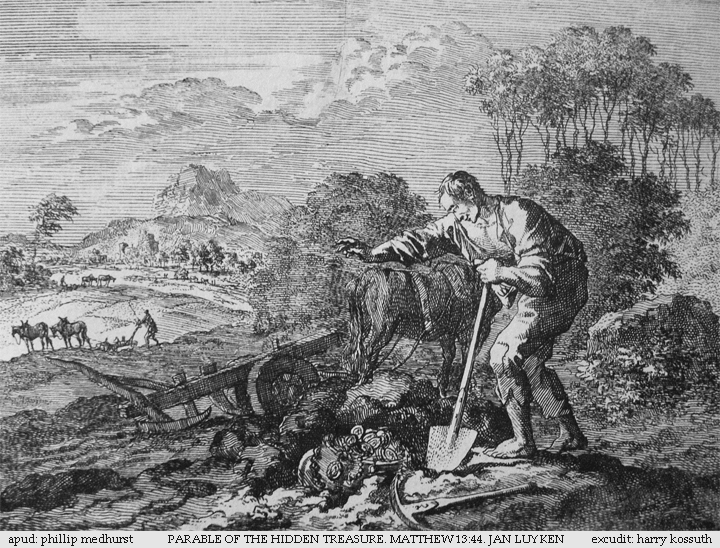
Parable of the Hidden Treasure in the Bowyer Bible

John Chrysostom: "The foregoing parables of the leaven, and the grain of mustard-seed, are referred to the power of the Gospel preaching, which has subdued the whole world; in order to show its value and splendour, He now puts forth parables concerning a pearl and a treasure, saying, The kingdom of heaven is like unto treasure hid in a field. For the Gospel preaching is hidden in this world; and if you do not sell your all you will not purchase it; and this you ought to do with joy; wherefore it follows, which when a man hath found, he hideth it."

Hilary of Poitiers: "This treasure is indeed found without cost; for the Gospel preaching is open to all, but to use and possess the treasure with its field we may not without price, for heavenly riches are not obtained without the loss of this world."

Jerome: "That he hides it, does not proceed of envy towards others, but as one that treasures up what he would not lose, he hides in his heart that which he prizes above his former possessions." "Or, That treasure in which are hid all the treasures of wisdom and knowledge (Colossians 2:3), is either God the Word, who seems hid in Christ’s flesh, or the Holy Scriptures, in which are laid up the knowledge of the Saviour."

Gregory the Great: "Otherwise, the treasure hidden in the field is the desire of heaven; the field in which the treasure is hidden is the discipline of heavenly learning; this, when a man finds, he hides, in order that he may preserve it; for zeal and affections heavenward it is not enough that we protect from evil spirits, if we do not protect from human praises. For in this present life we are in the way which leads to our country, and evil spirits as robbers beset us in our journey. Those therefore who carry their treasure openly, they seek to plunder in the way. When I say this, I do not mean that our neighbours should not see our works, but that in what we do, we should not seek praise from without. The kingdom of heaven is therefore compared to things of earth, that the mind may rise from things familiar to things unknown, and may learn to love the unknown by that which it knows is loved when known. It follows, And for joy thereof he goeth and selleth all that he hath, and buyeth that field. He it is that sells all he has and buys the field, who, renouncing fleshly delights, tramples upon all his worldly desires in his anxiety for the heavenly discipline."

Augustine: "Or, He speaks of the two testaments in the Church, which, when any has attained to a partial understanding of, he perceives how great things lie hid there, and goes and sells all that he has, and buys that; that is, by despising temporal things he purchases to himself peace, that he may be rich in the knowledge of God."

== Gospel of Thomas ==
A similar parable also appears in the Gospel of Thomas (Saying 109):

The kingdom of Heaven is like a person who had a treasure hidden in his field but did not know it. And [when] he died he left it to his [son]. The son [did] not know about it either. He took over the field and sold it. The buyer went plowing, [discovered] the treasure, and began to lend money at interest to whomever he wished.

— Gospel of Thomas 109, Patterson/Meyer translation

This work's version of the parable of the Pearl appears earlier (Saying 76), rather than immediately following, as in Matthew. However, the mention of a treasure in Saying 76 may reflect a source for the Gospel of Thomas in which the parables were adjacent, so that the original pair of parables has been "broken apart, placed in separate contexts, and expanded in a manner characteristic of folklore." The multiple changes of ownership of the field are unique to the Gospel of Thomas, and reflect a different theme from the New Testament parable.

== Depictions ==
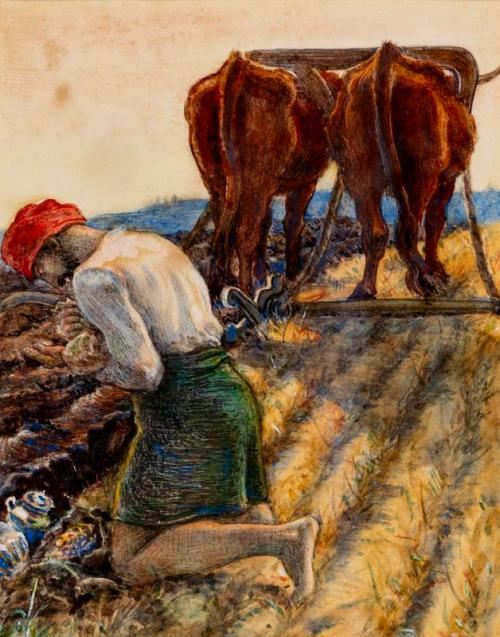
Parable - The Hidden Treasure by John Everett Millais, ca.1860, Aberdeen Art Gallery

There have been several depictions of the New Testament parable in art, including works by Rembrandt, Jan Luyken, James Tissot, and John Everett Millais.

== See also ==
- Five Discourses of Matthew
- Life of Jesus in the New Testament
- Ministry of Jesus
