= Parable of the Tares =

Parable taught by Jesus of Nazareth according to the Christian Gospel of Matthew

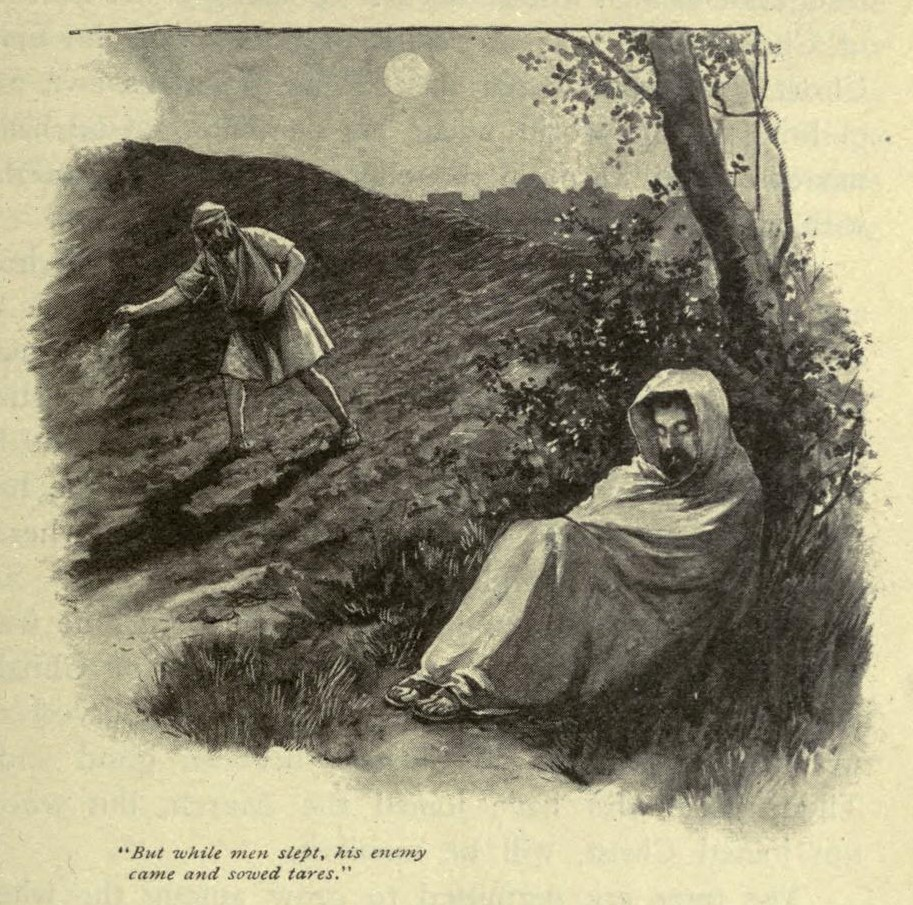
But while men slept, his enemy came and sowed tares. Illustration from Christ's Object Lessons by Ellen Gould Harmon White, c. 1900.

The Parable of the Weeds or Tares (KJV: tares, WNT: darnel, DRB: cockle) is a parable of Jesus which appears in Matthew 13:24–43. The parable relates how servants eager to pull up weeds were warned that in so doing they would root out the wheat as well and were told to let both grow together until the harvest. Later in Matthew, the weeds are identified with "the children of the evil one", the wheat with "the children of the Kingdom", and the harvest with "the end of the age". A shorter, compressed version of the parable is found without any interpretation in the apocryphal Gospel of Thomas.

== Narrative ==
The parable in the Gospel of Matthew goes as follows:

Another parable put he forth unto them, saying, The kingdom of heaven is likened unto a man which sowed good seed in his field:

But while men slept, his enemy came and sowed tares among the wheat, and went his way.
But when the blade was sprung up, and brought forth fruit, then appeared the tares also.
So the servants of the householder came and said unto him, Sir, didst not thou sow good seed in thy field? from whence then hath it tares?
He said unto them, An enemy hath done this. The servants said unto him, Wilt thou then that we go and gather them up?
But he said, Nay; lest while ye gather up the tares, ye root up also the wheat with them.
Let both grow together until the harvest: and in the time of harvest I will say to the reapers, Gather ye together first the tares, and bind them in bundles to burn them: but gather the wheat into my barn.

— Matthew 13:24–30

== Analysis ==
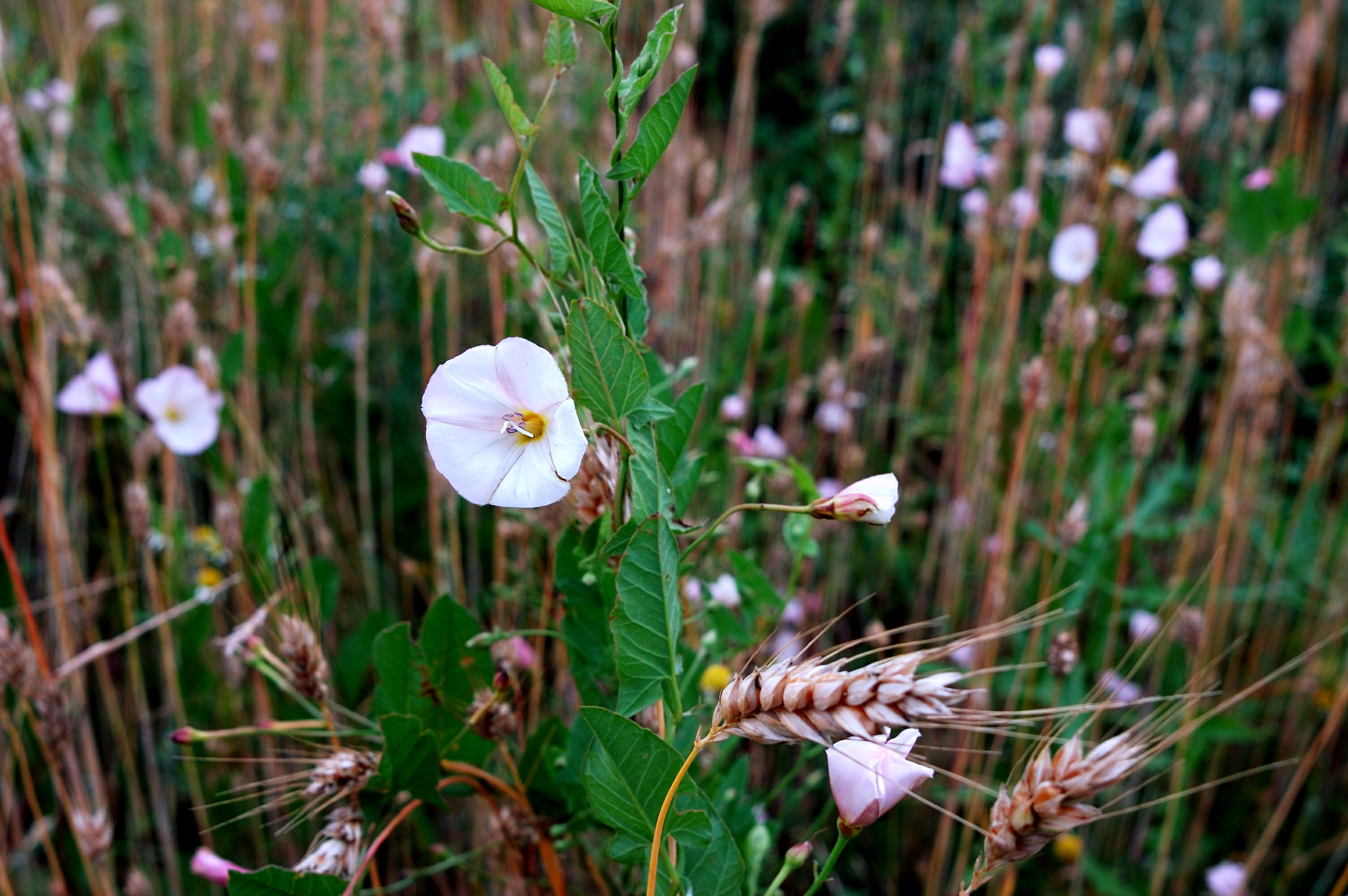
Convolvulus arvensis growing on the wheat Triticum aestivum

The word translated "tares" in the King James Version is ζιζάνια (zizania), plural of ζιζάνιον (zizanion). This word is thought to mean darnel (Lolium temulentum), a ryegrass which looks much like wheat in its early stages of growth.

The Weymouth New Testament, a translation of the Greek, translates the word as "Darnel". The Douay-Rheims Bible translates the word as "Cockle", possibly referring to the "White Cockle". Roman law prohibited sowing darnel among the wheat of an enemy, suggesting that the scenario presented here is realistic. Many translations use "weeds" instead of "tares".

A similar metaphor is wheat and chaff, replacing (growing) tares by (waste) chaff, and in other places in the Bible "wicked ones" are likened to chaff.

Verna Holyhead suggests that the burning of the unwanted tares (Matthew 13:30) refers to their use as fuel rather than merely their destruction.

== Interpretation ==
An eschatological interpretation is provided by Jesus in Matthew 13:36–43:

Then Jesus sent the multitudes away, and went into the house. His disciples came to him, saying, "Explain to us the parable of the darnel weeds of the field." He answered them, "He who sows the good seed is the Son of Man, the field is the world; and the good seed, these are the children of the Kingdom; and the darnel weeds are the children of the evil one. The enemy who sowed them is the devil. The harvest is the end of the age, and the reapers are angels. As therefore the darnel weeds are gathered up and burned with fire; so will it be at the end of this age. The Son of Man will send out his angels, and they will gather out of his Kingdom all things that cause stumbling, and those who do iniquity, and will cast them into the furnace of fire. There will be weeping and the gnashing of teeth. Then the righteous will shine forth like the sun in the Kingdom of their Father. He who has ears to hear, let him hear.

— Matthew 13:36–43

Although Jesus has distinguished between people who are part of the Kingdom of Heaven and those who are not, this difference may not always be readily apparent, as the parable of the Leaven indicates. However, the final judgment will be the "ultimate turning-point when the period of the secret growth of God's kingdom alongside the continued activity of the evil one will be brought to an end, and the new age which was inaugurated in principle in Jesus' earthly ministry will be gloriously consummated."

St. Augustine pointed out that the invisible distinction between "wheat" and "tares" also runs through the Church:

O you Christians, whose lives are good, you sigh and groan as being few among many, few among very many. The winter will pass away, the summer will come; lo! The harvest will soon be here. The angels will come who can make the separation, and who cannot make mistakes. ... I tell you of a truth, my Beloved, even in these high seats there is both wheat, and tares, and among the laity there is wheat, and tares. Let the good tolerate the bad; let the bad change themselves, and imitate the good. Let us all, if it may be so, attain to God; let us all through His mercy escape the evil of this world. Let us seek after good days, for we are now in evil days; but in the evil days let us not blaspheme, that so we may be able to arrive at the good days.

Some Christians understand "the children of the evil one" and "the children of the kingdom" to be something else than humans. Origen for instance offered such an interpretation. He also argued that Jesus's interpretation of the parable needs an interpretation of its own, pointing to the phrase with which Jesus followed his exposition of the parable, namely, "He who has ears to hear, let him hear", which occurs after biblical passages with a hidden meaning (see Luke 14:34–14:35 and Mark 4:2–4:9). Here is an abridged version of Origen's commentary on Jesus's interpretation of the parable:

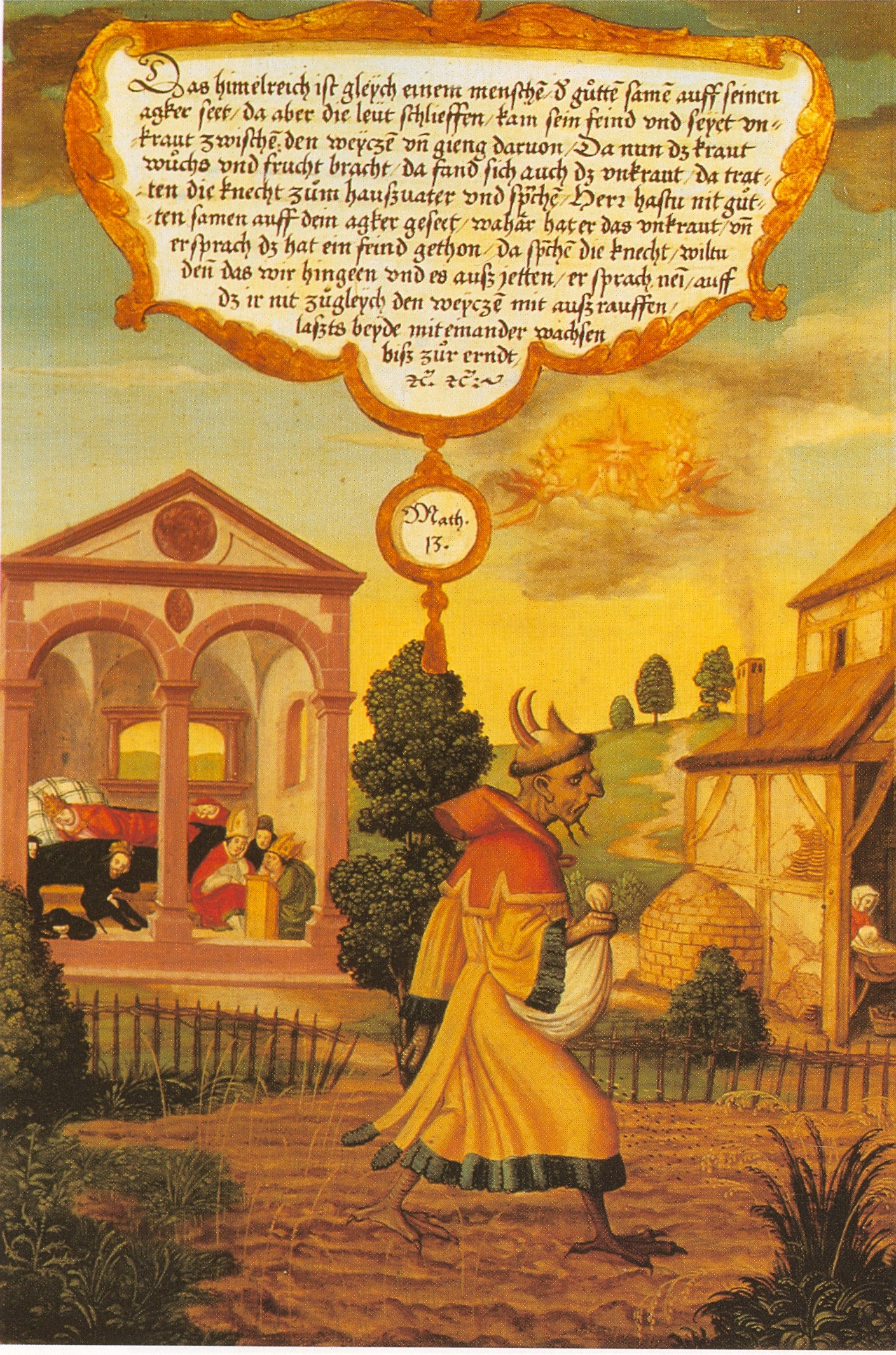
The enemy sowing weeds

Good things in the human soul and wholesome words about anything have been sown by God the Word and are children of the kingdom. But while men are asleep who do not act according to the command of Jesus, "Watch and pray that you enter not into temptation", (Matthew 26:41) the devil sows evil opinions over natural conceptions. In the whole world the Son of man sowed the good seed, but the wicked one tares—evil words. At the end of things there will be a harvest, in order that the angels may gather up and give over to fire the bad opinions that have grown upon the soul. Then those who become conscious that they have received the seeds of the evil one in themselves shall wail and be angry against themselves; for this is the gnashing of teeth. (Acts 7:54) Then shall the righteous shine, no longer differently, but all "as one sun". (Matthew 13:43) Daniel, knowing that the righteous differ in glory, said, "And the intelligent shall shine as the brightness of the firmament, and from among the multitudes of the righteous as the stars for ever and ever." (Daniel 12:3) The Apostle says the same thing: "There is one glory of the sun, and another glory of the moon, and another glory of the stars: for one star differs from another star in glory: so also is the resurrection of the dead." (1 Corinthians 15:41–15:42) I think, then, that at the beginning of blessedness the difference connected with the light takes place. Perhaps the saying, "Let your light shine before men" (Matthew 5:16), can be written on the table of the heart in a threefold way; so that now the light of the disciples of Jesus shines before the rest of men, and after death before the resurrection, and after the resurrection until "all attain to a full-grown man" (Ephesians 4:13), and all become one sun.

The parable seems to have been interpreted in a similar way by Athenagoras who stated that "false opinions are an aftergrowth from another sowing", and by St. Gregory Nazianzen who exhorted those who were going to be baptized: "Only be not ignorant of the measure of grace; only let not the enemy, while you sleep, maliciously sow tares." Moreover, St. Gregory of Nyssa relates how his sister St. Macrina cited the parable as a scriptural support for her idea that God gave humans a passionate nature for a good purpose and that passions become vices when we fail to use our reason properly. In her opinion, the "impulses of the soul, each one of which, if only they are cultured for good, necessarily puts forth the fruit of virtue within us", are the good seed, among which "the bad seed of the error of judgment as to the true Beauty" has been scattered. From the bad seed, "the growth of delusion" springs up by which the true Beauty "has been thrown into the shade."

Due to this, "the seed of anger does not steel us to be brave, but only arms us to fight with our own people; and the power of loving deserts its intellectual objects and becomes completely mad for the immoderate enjoyment of pleasures of sense; and so in like manner our other affections put forth the worse instead of the better growths." But "the wise Husbandman" leaves the growth of the "error as to Beauty" to remain among his seed, "so as to secure our not being altogether stripped of better hopes" by our passions having been rooted out along with it. For "if love is taken from us, how shall we be united to God? If anger is to be extinguished, what arms shall we possess against the adversary? Therefore the Husbandman leaves those bastard seeds within us, not for them always to overwhelm the more precious crop, but in order that the land itself (for so, in his allegory, he calls the heart) by its native inherent power, which is that of reasoning, may wither up the one growth and may render the other fruitful and abundant: but if that is not done, then he commissions the fire to mark the distinction in the crops." Finally, Theophylact of Ohrid believed that the parable has a double meaning, writing that the field "is the world, or, each one’s soul", that the "good seed is good people, or, good thoughts", and that the tares are heretics, or, bad thoughts.

== Religious toleration ==
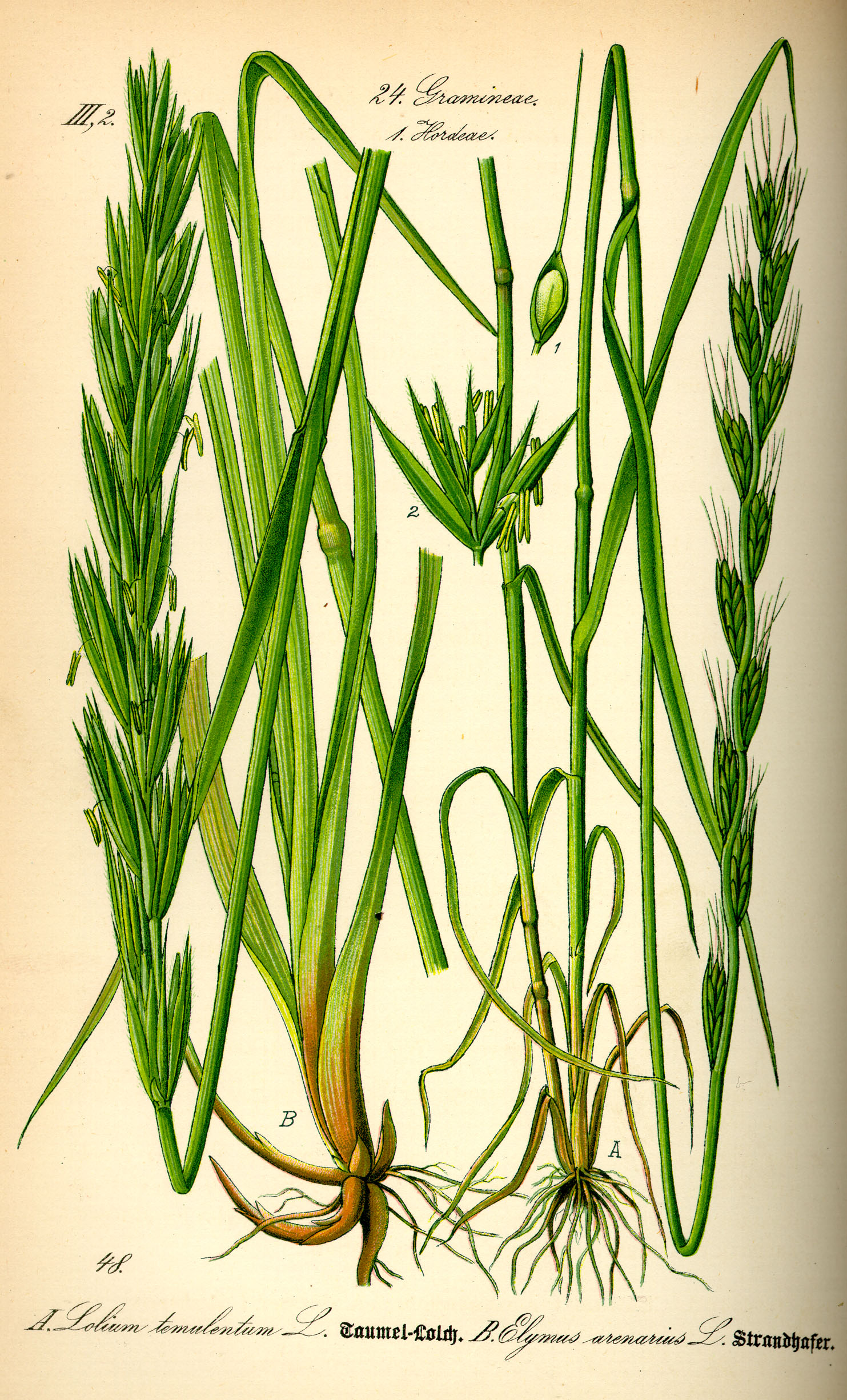
The weeds or "tares" (Greek: ζιζάνιον, zizanion) were probably darnel.

This parable has often been cited in support of various degrees of religious toleration. Once the wheat is identified with orthodox believers and the tares with heretics, the command Let both grow together until the harvest becomes a call for toleration (at least to some degree).

Preaching on the parable, St. John Chrysostom declared that "it is not right to put a heretic to death, since an implacable war would be brought into the world" which would lead to the death of many saints. Furthermore, he suggested that the phrase Lest ye root up the wheat with them can mean "that of the very tares it is likely that many may change and become wheat." However, he also asserted that God does not forbid depriving heretics of their freedom of speech, and "breaking up their assemblies and confederacies".

In his "Letter to Bishop Roger of Chalons", Bishop Wazo of Liege (c. 985-1048 AD) relied on the parable to argue that "the church should let dissent grow with orthodoxy until the Lord comes to separate and judge them", a remarkable departure from the standard Catholic view of the time of handing over heretics to the secular arm to be punished.

Opponents of toleration, such as Thomas Aquinas and the inquisitors, but also John Calvin and Theodore Beza, did not interpret the parable as excluding the execution of heretics. Some argued that a number of tares can be carefully uprooted without harming the wheat. What is more, the tares could be identified with moral offenders within the Church, or alternatively the prohibition of pulling up the tares could be applied only to the clergy, not to the magistrates. As a millennialist, Thomas Müntzer could call for rooting up the tares, claiming that the time of harvest had come.

Martin Luther preached a sermon on the parable in which he affirmed that only God can separate false from true believers and stressed that killing heretics ends any opportunity they may have for salvation:

From this observe what raging and furious people we have been these many years, in that we desired to force others to believe; the Turks with the sword, heretics with fire, the Jews with death, and thus outroot the tares by our own power, as if we were the ones who could reign over hearts and spirits, and make them pious and right, which God's Word alone must do. But by murder we separate the people from the Word, so that it cannot possibly work upon them and we bring thus, with one stroke a double murder upon ourselves, as far as it lies in our power, namely, in that we murder the body for time and the soul for eternity, and afterwards say we did God a service by our actions, and wish to merit something special in heaven.

He concluded that "although the tares hinder the wheat, yet they make it the more beautiful to behold". Several years later, however, Luther emphasized that the magistrates should eliminate heretics: "The magistrate bears the sword with the command to cut off offense. ... Now the most dangerous and atrocious offense is false teaching and an incorrect church service." Ironically, the Catholic Church considered Martin Luther and the rest of the Protestant Reformers to be heretics themselves.

Roger Williams, a Baptist theologian and founder of Rhode Island, used this parable to support government toleration of all of the "weeds" (heretics) in the world, because civil persecution often inadvertently hurts the "wheat" (believers) too. Instead, Williams believed it was God's duty to judge in the end, not man's. This parable lent further support to Williams' Biblical philosophy of a wall of separation between church and state as described in his 1644 book, The Bloody Tenent of Persecution.

The Protestant John Milton, in Areopagitica (1644), calling for freedom of speech and condemning Parliament's attempt to license printing, referred to this parable and the Parable of Drawing in the Net, both found in Matthew 13:

[I]t is not possible for man to sever the wheat from the tares, the good fish from the other fry; that must be the Angels' ministry at the end of mortal things.

== Commentary from the Church Fathers ==
Chrysostom: "In the foregoing parable the Lord spoke to such as do not receive the word of God; here of those who receive a corrupting seed. This is the contrivance of the Devil, ever to mix error with truth."

Jerome: "He set forth also this other parable, as it were a rich householder refreshing his guests with various meats, that each one according to the nature of his stomach might find some food adapted to him. He said not 'a second parable', but another; for had He said 'a second', we could not have looked for a third; but another prepares us for many more."

Saint Remigius: "Here He calls the Son of God Himself the kingdom of heaven; for He saith, The kingdom of heaven is like unto a man that sowed good seed in his field."

Chrysostom: "He then points out the manner of the Devil’s snares, saying, While men slept, his enemy came and sowed tares in the midst of the wheat, and departed. He here shows that error arose after truth, as indeed the course of events testifies; for the false prophets came after the Prophets, the false apostles after the Apostles, and Antichrist after Christ. For unless the Devil sees somewhat to imitate, and some to lay in wait against, he does not attempt any thing. Therefore because he saw that this man bears fruit an hundred, this sixty, and this thirty-fold, and that he was not able to carry off or to choke that which had. taken root, he turns to other insidious practices, mixing up his own seed, which is a counterfeit of the true, and thereby imposes upon such as are prone to be deceived. So the parable speaks, not of another seed, but of tares which bear a great likeness to wheat corn. Further, the malignity of the Devil is shown in this, that he sowed when all else was completed, that he might do the greater hurt to the husbandman."

Chrysostom: "In what follows He more particularly draws the picture of an heretic, in the words, When the blade grew, and put forth fruit, then appeared the tares also. For heretics at first keep themselves in the shade; but when they have had long license, and when men have held communication with them in discourse, then they pour forth their venom."

Augustine: "Or otherwise; When a man begins to be spiritual, discerning between things, then he begins to see errors; for he judges concerning whatsoever he hears or reads, whether it departs from the rule of truth; but until he is perfected in the same spiritual things, he might be disturbed at so many false heresies having existed under the Christian name, whence it follows, And the servants of the householder coming to him said unto him, Didst thou not sow good seed in thy field? whence then hath it tares? Are these servants then the same as those whom He afterwards calls reapers? Because in His exposition of the parable, He expounds the reapers to be the Angels, and none would dare to say that the Angels were ignorant who had sowed tares, we should the rather understand that the faithful are here intended by the servants. And no wonder if they are also signified by the good seed; for the same thing admits of different likenesses according to its different significations; as speaking of Himself He says that He is the door, he is the shepherd."

Saint Remigius: "They came to the Lord not with the body, but with the heart and desire of the soul; and from Him they gather that this was done by the craft of the Devil, whence it follows, And he saith unto them, An enemy hath done this."

Jerome: "The Devil is called a man that is an enemy because he has ceased to be God; and in the ninth Psalm it is written of him, Up, Lord, and let not man have the upper hand. Wherefore let not him sleep that is set over the Church, lest through his carelessness the enemy should sow therein tares, that is, the dogmas of the heretics."

Chrysostom: "He is called the enemy on account of the losses he inflicts on men; for the assaults of the Devil are made upon us, though their origin is not in his enmity towards us, but in his enmity towards God."

Augustine: "And when the servants of God knew that it was the Devil who had contrived this fraud, whereby when he found that he had no power in open warfare against a Master of such great name, he had introduced his fallacies under cover of that name itself, the desire might readily arise in them to remove such men from out of human affairs if opportunity should be given them; but they first appeal to God’s justice whether they should so do; The servants said, Wilt thou that we go and gather them out?"

Chrysostom: "Wherein observe the thoughtfulness and affection of the servants; they hasten to root up the tares, thus showing their anxiety about the good seed; for this is all to which they look, not that any should be punished, but that that which is sown should not perish. The Lord’s answer follows, And he saith unto them, Nay."

Jerome: "For room for repentance is left, and we are warned that we should not hastily cut off a brother, since one who is to-day corrupted with an erroneous dogma, may grow wiser tomorrow, and begin to defend the truth; wherefore it is added, Lest in gathering together the tares ye root out the wheat also."

Jerome: "But this seems to contradict that command, Put away the evil from among you. (1 Cor. 5:13) For if the rooting up be forbidden, and we are to abide in patience till the harvest-time, how are we to cast forth any from among us? But between wheat and tares (which in Latin we call ‘lolium’) so long as it is only in blade, before the stalk has put forth an ear, there is very great resemblance, and none or little difference to distinguish them by. The Lord then warns us not to pass a hasty sentence on an ambiguous word, but to reserve it for His judgment, that when the day of judgment shall come, He may cast forth from the assembly of the saints no longer on suspicion but on manifest guilt."

Chrysostom: "This the Lord spake to forbid any putting to death. For we ought not to kill an heretic, seeing that so a never-ending war would be introduced into the world; and therefore He says, Lest ye root out with them the wheat also; that is, if you draw the sword and put the heretic to death, it must needs be that many of the saints will fall with them. Hereby He does not indeed forbid all restraint upon heretics, that their freedom of speech should be cut off, that their synods and their confessions should be broken up—but only forbids that they should be put to death."

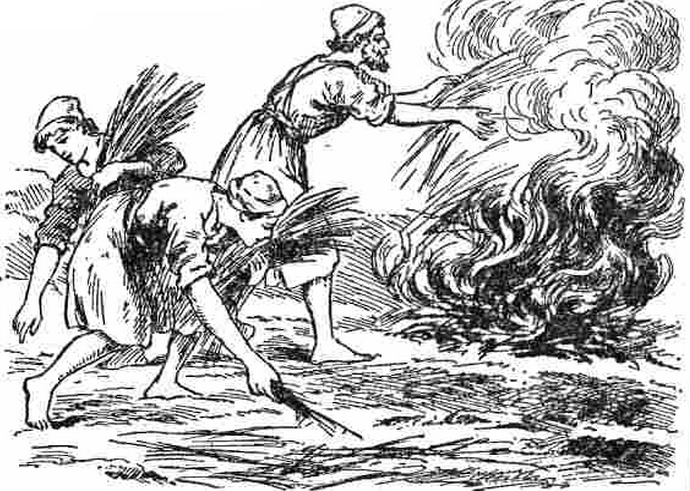
The burning of the tares

Saint Remigius: "It follows, And in the time of harvest I will say to the reapers, Gather together first the tares, and bind them in bundles to burn them. The harvest is the season of reaping which here designates the day of judgment, in which the good are to be separated from the bad."

Chrysostom: "But why does He say, Gather first the tares? That the good should have no fears lest the wheat should be rooted up with them:"

Jerome: "In that He says that the bundles of tares are to be cast into the fire, and the wheat gathered into barns, it is clear that heretics also and hypocrites are to be consumed in the fires of hell, while the saints who are here represented by the wheat are received into the barns, that is into heavenly mansions."

Augustine: "It may be asked why He commands more than one bundle or heap of tares to be formed? Perhaps because of the variety of heretics differing not only from the wheat, but also among themselves, each several heresy, separated from communion with all the others, is designated as a bundle; and perhaps they may even then begin to be bound together for burning, when they first sever themselves from the Catholic communion, and begin to have their independent church, so that it is the burning and not the binding into bundles that will take place at the end of the world. But were this so, there would not be so many who would become wise again, and return from error into the Catholic Church. Wherefore we must understand the binding into bundles to be what shall come to pass in the end, that punishment should fall on them not promiscuously, but in due proportion to the obstinacy and wilfulness of each separate error."

Rabanus Maurus: "when He says, Sowed good seed, He intends that good will which is in the elect; when He adds, An enemy came, He intimates that watch should be kept against him; when as the tares grow up, He suffers it patiently, saying, An enemy hath done this, He recommends to us patience; when He says, Lest haply in gathering the tares, &c. He sets us an example of discretion; when He says, Suffer both to grow together till the harvest, He teaches us long-suffering; and, lastly, He inculcates justice, when He says, Bind them into bundles to burn."

== Depictions ==
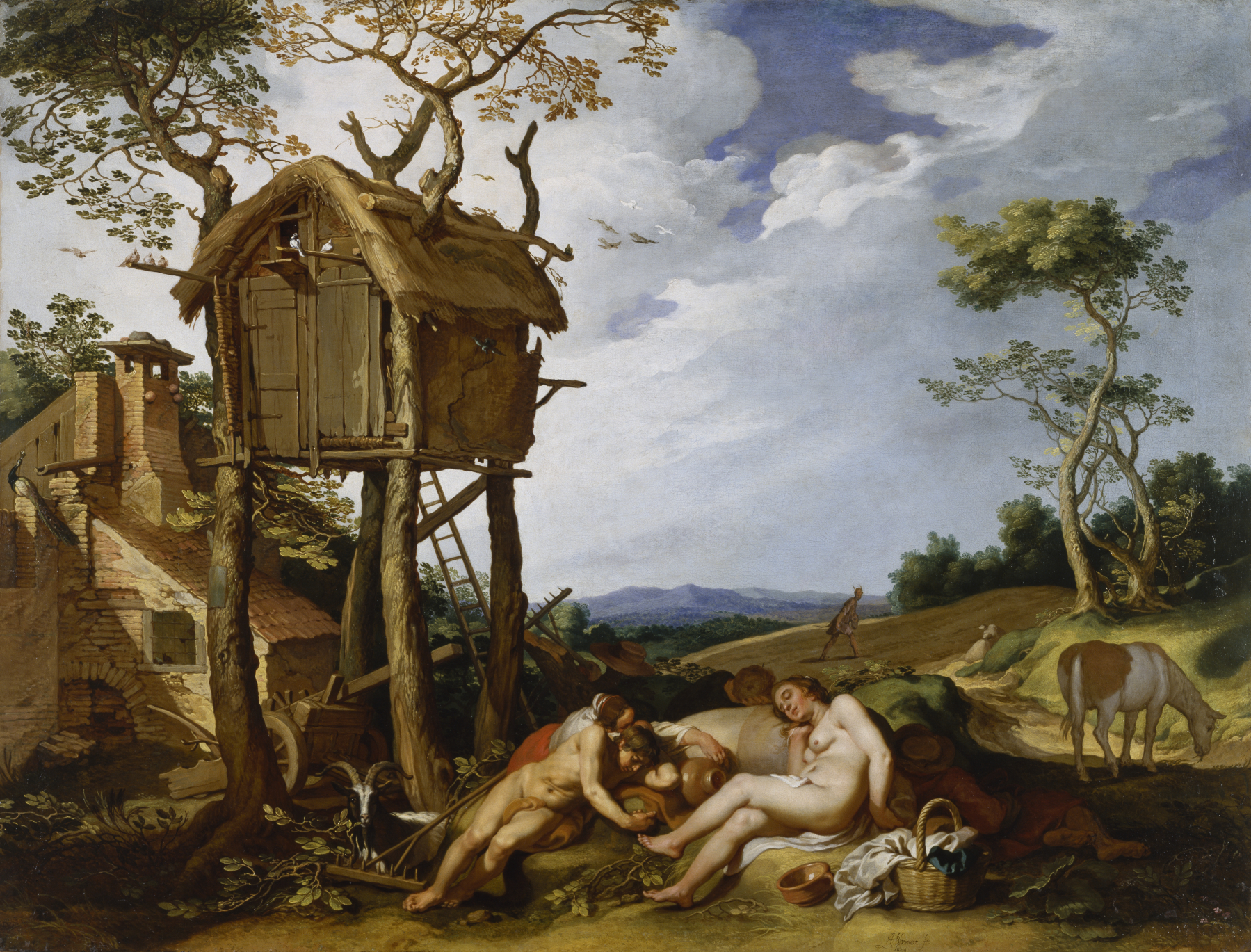
Parable of the Wheat and the Tares by Abraham Bloemaert (1624)

This parable has been depicted by several artists, including William Blake,Lucas van Uden, Abraham Bloemaert, Albin Egger-Lienz, Domenico Fetti, Jan Luyken, John Everett Millais, Félicien Rops, James Tissot, and Roger Wagner.

Henry Alford used the parable as the primary basis for his harvest hymn "Come, Ye Thankful People, Come".

== See also ==
- Five Discourses of Matthew
- Life of Jesus in the New Testament
- Ministry of Jesus
