= Jack Dean Kingsbury =

Jack Dean Kingsbury (born 1934) is the former Aubrey Lee Brooks professor of theology at Union Presbyterian Seminary in Richmond, Virginia, now an emeritus professor.

He is a scholar of the New Testament, specializing in the Book of Matthew and the other Synoptic Gospels. As a biblical scholar, he wrote a number of books on New Testament topics.

== Works ==
=== Books ===
- Kingsbury, Jack Dean (1969). The Parables of Jesus in Matthew 13: a study in redaction-criticism. Richmond, VA: John Knox Press. ISBN 9780804203807. OCLC 12795.
- ——— (1975). Matthew: Structure, Christology, Kingdom. Philadelphia, PA: Fortress Press. ISBN 9780800604349. OCLC 1952998.
- ——— (1977). Matthew by Jack Dean Kingsbury. Philadelphia: Fortress Press. ISBN 9780800605865. OCLC 2986943.
- ——— (1981). Jesus Christ in Matthew, Mark and Luke. Philadelphia, PA: Fortress Press. ISBN 9780800605964. OCLC 7175998.
- ——— (1983). The Christology of Mark's Gospel. Philadelphia, PA: Fortress Press. ISBN 9780800607067. OCLC 9392399.
- ——— (1986). Matthew as Story. Philadelphia, PA: Fortress Press. ISBN 9780800620998. OCLC 17549119.
- ——— (1989). Conflict in Mark: Jesus, Authorities, Disciples. Minneapolis: Fortress Press. ISBN 9780800623364. OCLC 19353490.
- ——— (1991). Conflict in Luke: Jesus, Authorities, Disciples. Minneapolis: Fortress Press. ISBN 9780800624729. OCLC 22664361.
- ——— (1993). Pentecost 1: interpreting the lessons of the church year. Proclamation 5., Ser. A. Vol. 6. Minneapolis: Fortress Press. ISBN 9780800641825. OCLC 27400280.

=== As editor ===
- ———, ed. (1997). Gospel interpretation: narrative-critical & social-scientific approaches. Harrisburg, PA: Trinity Press International. ISBN 9781563382147. OCLC 37246318.

=== Articles and chapters ===
- ——— (1971). "Major Trends in Parable Interpretation". CTM. 42: 579–89.
- ——— (December 1974). "Composition and Christology of Matt 28:16-20". Journal of Biblical Literature. 93 (4): 573–584.
- ——— (June 1975). "Title Kyrios in Matthew's gospel". Journal of Biblical Literature. 94 (2): 246–255.
- ——— (December 1976). "Title "son of David" in Matthew's gospel". Journal of Biblical Literature. 95 (4): 591–602.
- ——— (March 1978). "Verb akolouthein ("to follow") as an index of Matthew's view of his community". Journal of Biblical Literature. 97 (1): 56–73.
- ——— (March 1979). "The figure of Peter in Matthew's Gospel as a theological problem". Journal of Biblical Literature. 98 (1): 67–83.

== Festschrift ==
- Powell, Mark Allan; Bauer, David R. (1999). Who do you say that I am? Essays on Christology: In honor of Jack Dean Kingsbury. Louisville, KY: Westminster John Knox Press. ISBN 9780664257521. OCLC 41039766.
