= Kingdom of heaven (Gospel of Matthew) =

Phrase used in the Gospel of Matthew

Kingdom of heaven (Greek: Βασιλεία τῶν οὐρανῶν) is a phrase used in the Gospel of Matthew. It is generally seen as equivalent to the phrase "kingdom of God" (Greek: βασιλεία τοῦ θεοῦ) in the Gospel of Mark and the Gospel of Luke. Thought to be the main content of Jesus's preaching in the Gospel of Matthew, the "kingdom of heaven" described "a process, a course of events, whereby God begins to govern or to act as king or Lord, an action, therefore, by which God manifests his being-God in the world of men."

== Compared with "kingdom of God" ==
Classical scholar Howard Clarke notes that Matthew 3:2 is the first reference to the "kingdom of heaven" in the Gospel of Matthew. The gospels of Mark, Luke, and John never use this expression, preferring instead in parallel texts the term "kingdom of God". Matthew's use of the word "heaven" is sometimes seen as a reflection of the sensibilities of the Jewish audience this gospel was directed to, and thus tried to avoid the word "God." Most scholars feel the two phrases are theologically identical. Of Matthew's thirty-two uses of this expression, twelve occur in material that is parallel to Mark and/or Luke, which address exactly the same topics but consistently refer to the "kingdom of God", e.g., the first beatitude (Matt 5:3; cf. Luke 6:20) and several remarks about, or included in, parables (Matt 13:11, 31, 33; cf. Mark 4:11, 30; Luke 8:10; 13:18, 20).

Robert Foster rejects this view. He finds the standard explanation hard to believe as Matthew uses the word "God" many other times and even uses the phrase "kingdom of God" four times. Foster argues that, to Matthew, the two concepts were different. For Foster, the word "heaven" had an important role in Matthew's theology and links the phrase especially to "Father in heaven", which Matthew frequently uses to refer to God. Foster argues that the "kingdom of God" represents the earthly domain that Jesus' opponents such as Pharisees thought they resided in, while the "kingdom of heaven" represents the truer spiritual domain of Jesus and his disciples.

Some theological bodies, such as the Jehovah's Witnesses, believe that only a selected minority of people, the 144,000 mentioned in Revelation, will be allowed to enter the Kingdom of Heaven, while all the other righteous men will live on the new earth, which will be governed by God as well. As such the Kingdom of Heaven would be part of the Kingdom of God, but not constitute the entirety of it.

== End times ==
Some scholars believe that when the phrase was first used, it was intended to be eschatological with the kingdom of heaven referring to the end times. However, they say, when the last judgment failed to occur within the era of the early Church, Christian scholars came to understand the term in reference to a spiritual state within (confer with Luke 17:21), or a much delayed end time (confer with Matthew 24:36). There is a difficulty for those believing in a delayed end time, since the phrase "the kingdom of God" is linked with other phrases like "at hand" or "is near," implying an imminent event. To this challenge, Albright and Mann suggest a better translation would state that the kingdom is "fast approaching." R. T. France sees it as even more immediate suggesting that the phrase should be read as referring to "a state of affairs that is already beginning and demands immediate action."

In the New Testament the throne of God is talked about in several forms: Heaven as the throne of God, the throne of David, the throne of Glory, the throne of Grace and many more. The New Testament continues Jewish identification of heaven itself as the "throne of God," but also locates the throne of God as "in heaven" and having a second subordinate seat at the Right Hand of God for the Session of Christ.

== See also ==
- Christ the King
- Son of Man
- New world order (Baháʼí)
