= Luke 13 =

- ← chapter 12 chapter 14 →
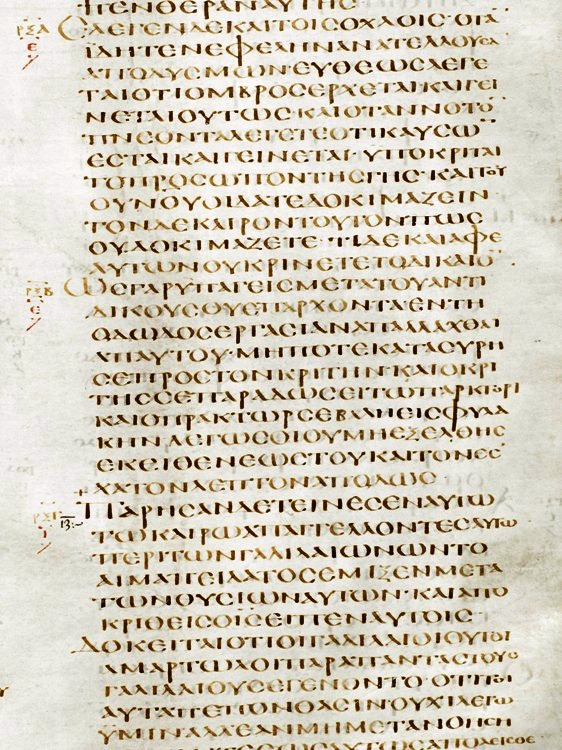
- Luke 12:54–13:4 in Codex Alexandrinus, c. AD 400–440
- Book: Gospel of Luke
- Category: Gospel
- Christian Bible part: New Testament
- Order in the Christian part: 3

Luke 13 is the thirteenth chapter of the Gospel of Luke in the New Testament of the Christian Bible. It records several parables and teachings told by Jesus Christ and his lamentation over the city of Jerusalem. Jesus resumes the journey to Jerusalem which he had embarked upon in Luke 9:51. This chapter, taken with Luke 12:54–59, begins to outline and illustrate "the problem with the Jewish nation" which accounts for the urgency of his journey to Jerusalem. Early Christian tradition generally accepts that Luke the Evangelist composed this Gospel as well as the Acts of the Apostles. Critical opinion on the tradition was evenly divided at the end of the 20th century.

== Text ==
The original text was written in Koine Greek. Some early manuscripts containing the text of this chapter are:

- Papyrus 75 (AD 175–225)
- Papyrus 45 (~250)
- Papyrus 138 (3rd century; extant verses 13–17, 25–30)
- Codex Vaticanus (325–350)
- Codex Sinaiticus (330–360)
- Codex Bezae (~400)
- Codex Washingtonianus (~400)
- Codex Alexandrinus (400–440)

This chapter is divided into 35 verses. The New King James Version organises it as follows (with cross references to other parts of the Bible):

- Luke 13:1–5 = Repent or Perish
- Luke 13:6–9 = The Parable of the Barren Fig Tree (Jeremiah 8:13)
- Luke 13:10–17 = A Spirit of Infirmity
- Luke 13:18–19 = The Parable of the Mustard Seed (Matthew 13:31–32; Mark 4:30–32)
- Luke 13:20–21 = The Parable of the Leaven (Matthew 13:33–35)
- Luke 13:22–33 = The Narrow Way
- Luke 13:34–35 = Jesus Laments over Jerusalem (Matthew 23:37–39; see also Luke 19:41)

== Old Testament references ==
Luke 13:27: Psalm 6:8

== Repent or perish (verses 1–5) ==
Jesus received a report that Pontius Pilate, who was described by Philo of Alexandria as cruel, corrupt, and unnecessarily violent, had killed some Galileans while they were worshiping God by offering sacrifices according to the Jewish religious law. This discussion is only recorded in Luke's gospel, and the incident is not otherwise known to history, although both Heinrich Meyer and Heinrich Ewald recognise a clear "stamp of primitive originality" in this passage.

Apparently those making the report, an identified group of people, were looking for Jesus to offer some explanation of why bad things happen to normal people, in this case even while they were worshiping. They assume that a victim must have done something terrible for God to allow something so tragic to happen to them. Jesus denies that this is the case and answers that, likewise, the calamities suffered by the victims of the falling of the Tower of Siloam were not related to their relative sinfulness; he then diverts the focus onto the interrogators, wanting them to consider their own souls.

Do you think that these Galileans were worse sinners than all the other Galileans, because they suffered in this way? No, I tell you; but unless you repent, you will all likewise perish. Or those eighteen on whom the tower in Siloam fell and killed them: do you think that they were worse offenders than all the others who lived in Jerusalem? No, I tell you; but unless you repent, you will all likewise perish.

His mention of the fall of the Tower of Siloam added a nuance to his previous point: accidents happen. Therefore, even in the absence of persecution, death can come unexpectedly to anyone, irrespective of how righteous or how sinful they are. He may have been emphasizing that the time granted by God for repentance is limited.

== Parable of the barren fig tree (verses 6–9) ==
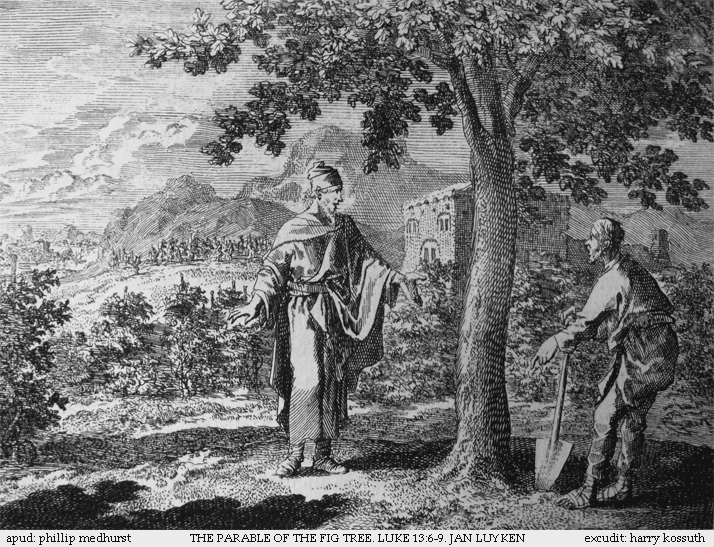
Jan Luyken's etching of the parable of the fig tree, Bowyer Bible

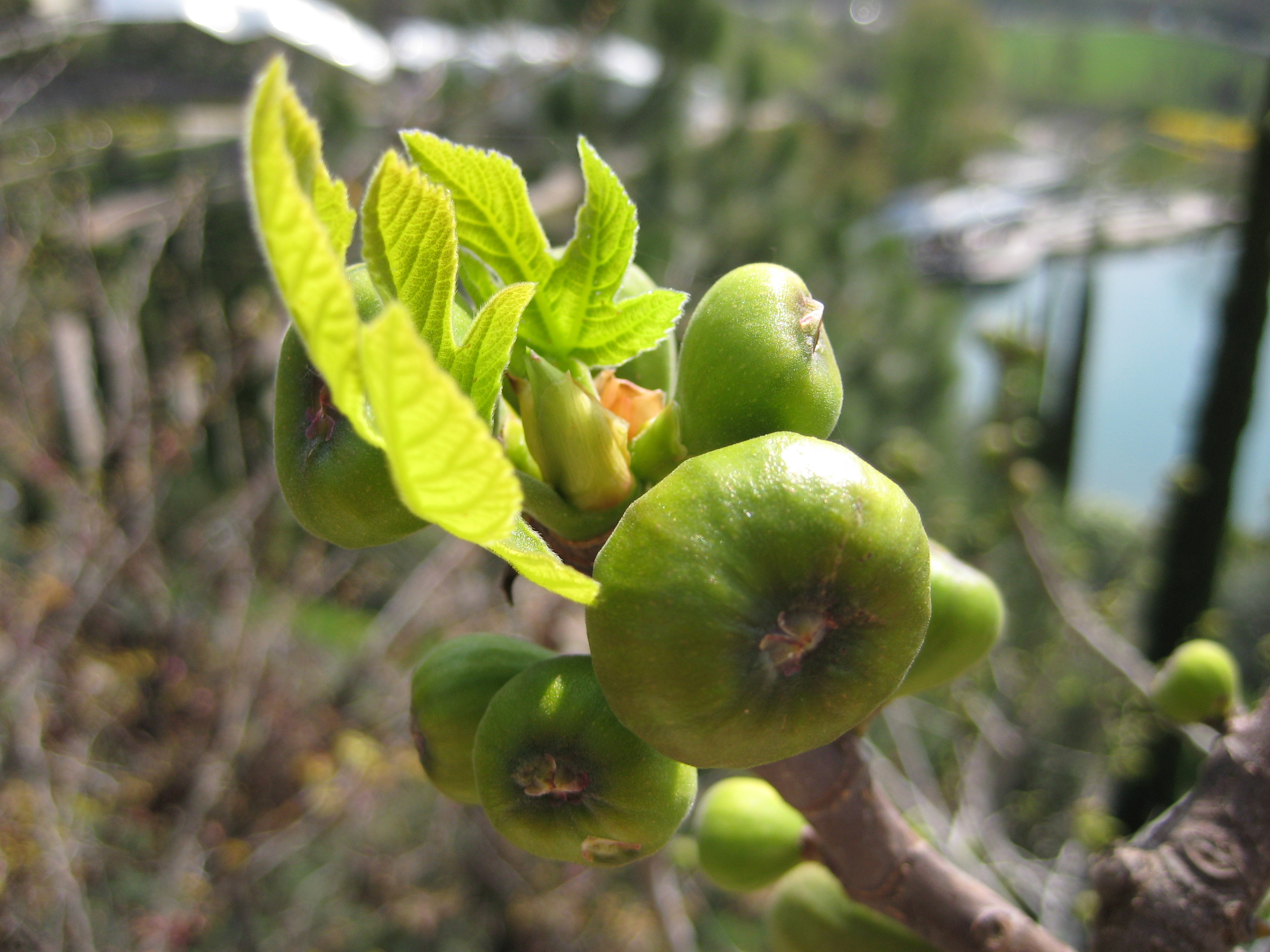
Fig fruit: what the owner expected

This parable, not to be confused with the parable of the budding fig tree, appears only in the Gospel of Luke among the canonical gospels of the New Testament. In this parable, the owner is generally regarded as representing God, who had a fig tree ("tree of knowledge") planted in his vineyard ("the garden of Eden") and came seeking fruit ("righteous works", which in part is a mystery). The gardener (vinedresser) is God and the vine is Jesus ("tree of Life"). Fig trees were often planted in vineyards. The fig tree was a common symbol for Israel, and may also have that meaning here, or the tree in the parable may refer to the religious leadership. In either case, the parable reflects Jesus offering his hearers one last chance for repentance. "These three years" logically refers to the period of Jesus' ministry. The parable has been connected to the miracle of cursing the fig tree. Richard Whately commented that this parable "is one which our Lord may be said to have put before his hearers twice; once in words, once in action".

Although the parable is found only in Luke's gospel, critics consider that there is no strong argument against its authenticity, for example a majority of the members of the Jesus Seminar voted it to be authentic.

== Jesus heals a crippled woman on the Sabbath (verses 10–17) ==
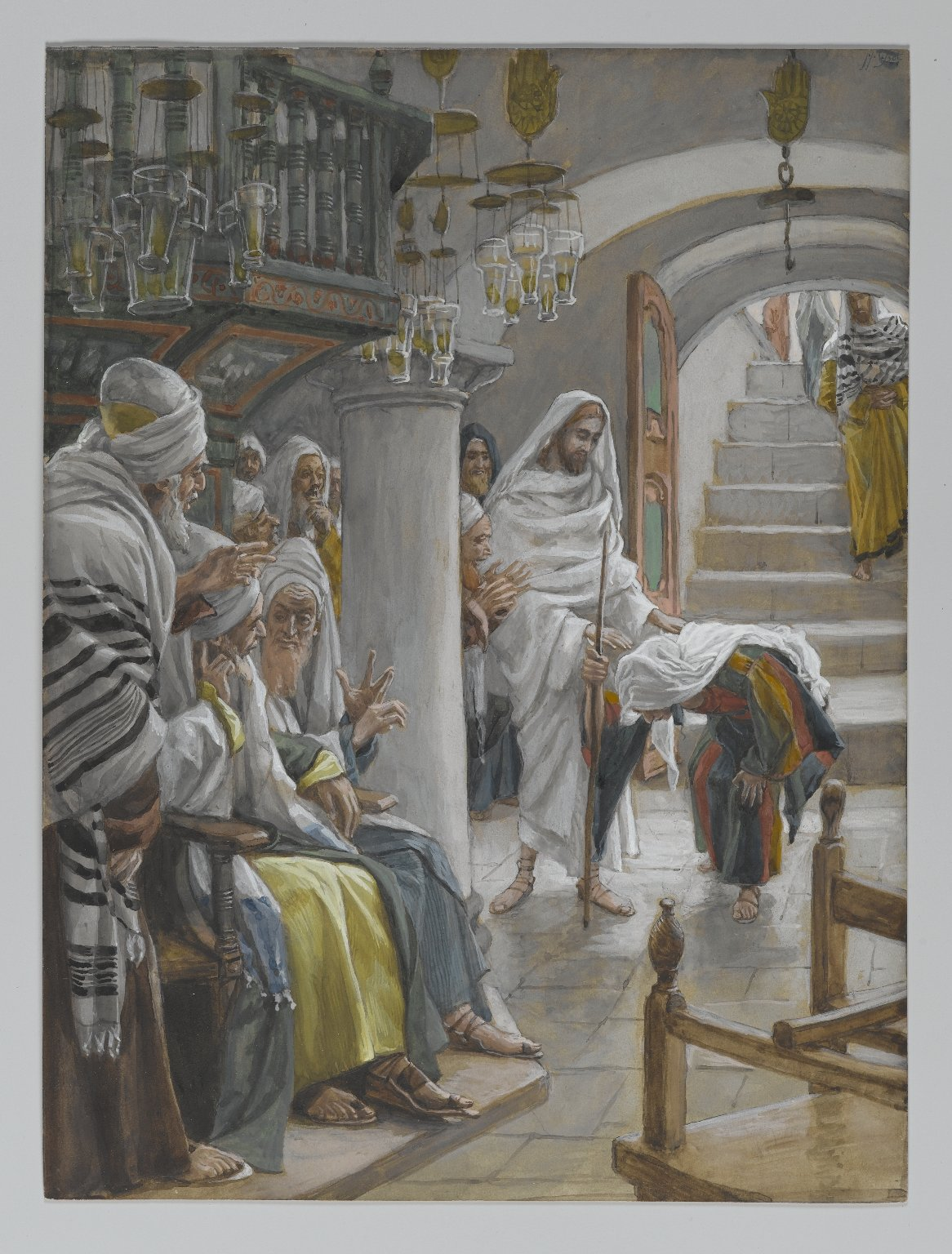
Christ healing an infirm woman by James Tissot, 1886–1896

This healing miracle of Jesus appears only in the Gospel of Luke among the canonical gospels of the New Testament. According to Luke's account, Jesus was teaching in a synagogue on the Sabbath day, when he observed a woman who had been crippled "by a spirit" for eighteen years, and healed her with the words "You have been set free". This might therefore be classified as an exorcism. The gospel account relates the story as another example of Jesus clashing with religious authorities over how the Sabbath should be honoured: when the synagogue ruler tells the woman she should have come to be healed on a different day, Jesus denounces the synagogue leaders as hypocrites because they would release their animals to feed on the Sabbath, so why should this "daughter of Abraham" (verse 16) not be set free on the Sabbath from what is keeping her captive?

Verse 15 has the singular Greek: ὑποκριτά, hypokrita, in the Textus Receptus, but the plural Greek: ὑποκριταί, hypokritai, in critical Greek texts such as the SBL Greek New Testament. Hence the King James Version reads "Thou hypocrite", addressing the synagogue leader only, whereas the New International Version reads "You hypocrites!". Free church minister William Robertson Nicoll suggests that the comment was "directed against the class", i.e. the synagogue leaders collectively.

In verse 17, Luke contrasts the reactions of "his adversaries" and the crowd:

And when He said these things, all His adversaries were put to shame; and all the multitude rejoiced for all the glorious things that were done by Him.

The religious leaders, according to Nicoll, were "ashamed, not as convinced but as confounded". Non-conformist theologian Matthew Poole makes the same point:

It is one thing to be ashamed, another thing to be convinced, so as to confess an error; they were ashamed that they were so put to silence before the people, but we read of no confession of their error and mistake, and begging Christ's pardon.

== Parable of the mustard seed (verses 18–19) ==
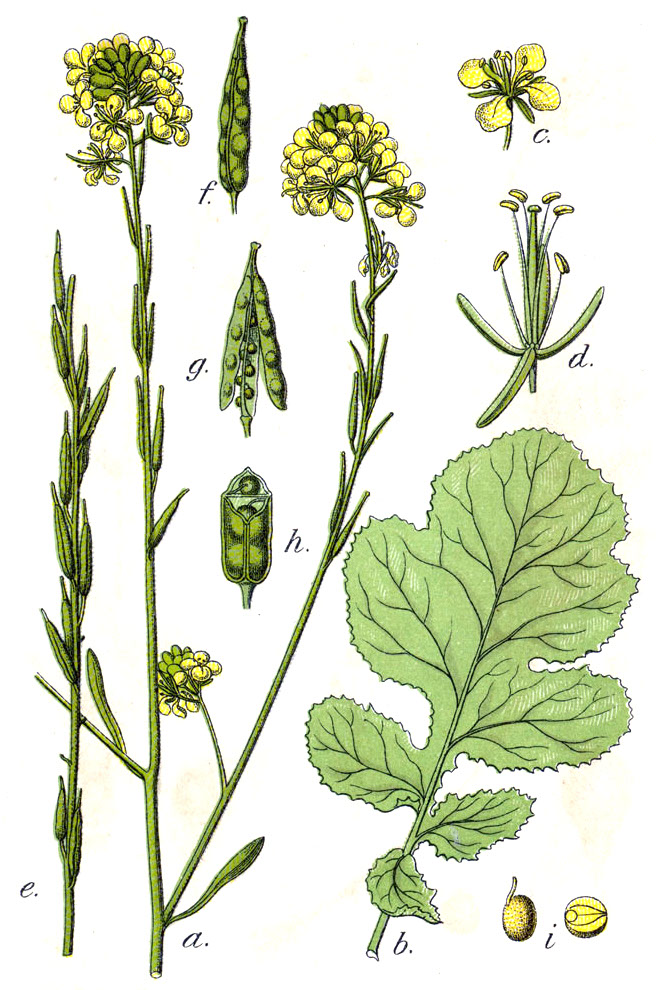
The black mustard plant

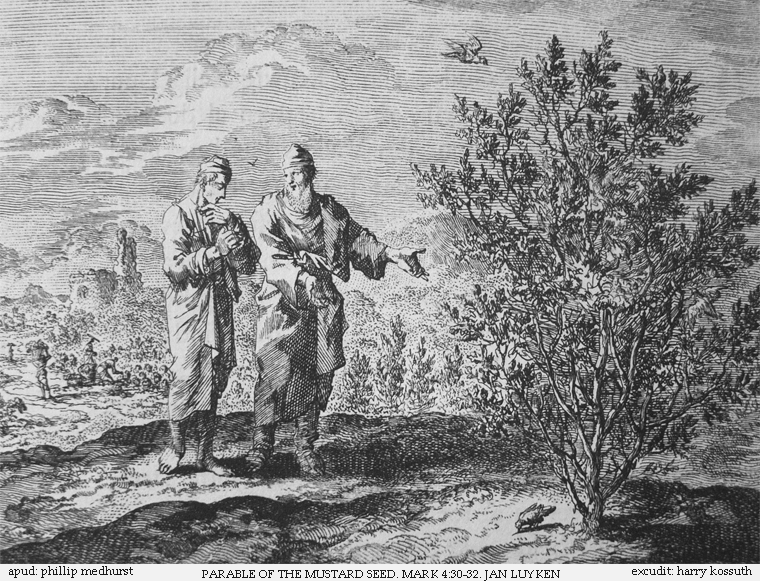
Etching by Jan Luyken illustrating the parable of the mustard seed, from the Bowyer Bible

This parable is one of the shorter parables of Jesus. It appears in all three of the canonical gospels of the New Testament. The differences between Gospels of Matthew (13:31–32), Mark (4:30–32), and Luke (13:18–19), are minor. In the Gospels of Matthew and Luke, it is immediately followed by the parable of the leaven, which shares this parable's theme of the Kingdom of Heaven growing from small beginnings.

A version of the parable also occurs in the non-canonical Gospel of Thomas 20.

The plant referred to here is generally considered to be black mustard, a large annual plant up to 9 feet (2.7 m) tall, but growing from a proverbially small seed: this smallness is also used to refer to faith in Matthew 17:20 and Luke 17:6. According to rabbinical sources, Jews did not grow the plant in gardens, and this is consistent with Matthew's description of it growing in a field. Luke tells the parable with the plant in a garden instead; this is presumably recasting the story for an audience outside Palestine.

== Parable of the leaven (verses 20–21) ==
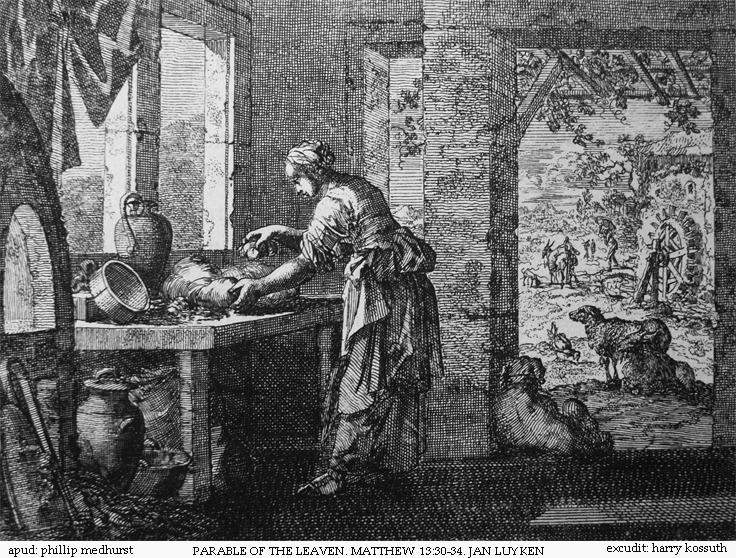
Etching by Jan Luyken illustrating the parable of the leaven, from the Bowyer Bible

The parable of the leaven (also called the parable of the yeast) is one of the shorter parables of Jesus. It appears in two of the canonical gospels of the New Testament and a version of the parable also occurs in the non-canonical Gospel of Thomas (96). The differences between Matthew (Matthew 13:33) and Luke (Luke 13:20–21) are minor. In both places the story immediately follows the Parable of the Mustard Seed, which shares this parable's theme of the Kingdom of Heaven growing from small beginnings.

== The narrow gate (verses 22–30) ==
And He went through the cities and villages, teaching, and journeying toward Jerusalem.

Luke reminds his readers of Jesus' journey, which was last mentioned in Luke 10:38, and "of the urgency it proclaims, and the response it demands". He is asked whether there are only a few who are (or will be) saved, a question "peculiar to Luke", although the answer, that the gate is narrow, and "many, I say to you, will seek to enter and will not be able", is also recorded in Matthew 7:13.

== Jesus laments over Jerusalem (verses 31–35) ==
In his continuing dialogue with the Pharisees, Jesus confirms that he must continue to Jerusalem. The Pharisees here warn Jesus about Herod Antipas: Franklin refers to them as "friendly" on this occasion. Luke outlines the significance of Jesus' journey to Jerusalem (see Luke 9:51) as if it was a journey in three days: "today and tomorrow" are concerned with sowing the seeds of the Kingdom of God, but they will lead on to a "third day", when Jesus will "complete" his course, referring to his passion, crucifixion and resurrection.

Both here, on the journey, and at Luke 19:41 when the city is in sight, Jesus contemplates the significance and fate of Jerusalem, the holy city.

== See also ==
- Sermon on the Mount
- Sermon on the Plain
- Ministry of Jesus
- Parables of Jesus
- Other related Bible parts: Psalm 6, Matthew 13, 23; Mark 4; Luke 19

Preceded by Luke 12	Chapters of the Bible; Gospel of Luke	Succeeded by Luke 14
