= P77 =

P77 may refer to:

- Bell XP-77, an American prototype fighter aircraft
- HMS Vivid (P77), a submarine of the Royal Navy
- INS Kamorta (P77), a corvette of the Indian Navy
- Papyrus 77, a biblical manuscript
- P77, a state regional road in Latvia
- P77 (film), a Filipino psychological horror]film
