= Parable of the empty jar =

Parable attributed to Jesus of Nazareth according to the non-canonical Gospel of Thomas

The Parable of the Empty Jar (also known as the Parable of the Woman with a Jar), is found in the non-canonical Gospel of Thomas. It does not appear in any of the Canonical gospels of the New Testament.

The parable is attributed to Jesus and reads:

The kingdom of the father is like a certain woman who was carrying a jar full of meal. While she was walking on the road, still some distance from home, the handle of the jar broke and the meal emptied out behind her on the road. She did not realize it; she had noticed no accident. When she reached her house, she set the jar down and found it empty.

== Authenticity ==
The scholars of the Jesus Seminar gave the Parable of the Empty Jar a "pink" rating, indicating that it is in their opinion probably, but not certainly, an authentic saying of Jesus. The scholars of the Seminar noted parallels with the parable of the leaven, which immediately precedes the parable of the empty jar in the Gospel of Thomas and the parable of the mustard seed: in all three the kingdom starts with something "unnoticed or unexpected or modest". However, the work of the Jesus Seminar has been criticized by other scholars.

== Interpretation ==
This parable has been given a wide variety of interpretations. It may be a warning against letting the "Kingdom", which according to Thomas 3 is "inside of you and outside of you" slip away like the lost flour: it may also be a simple warning against self-confidence.

The emptiness of the jar may represent an empty life: "people who live their lives in the world [...] carry jars they think are full, but discover, even after much activity, that they are empty". Another interpretation is that the parable refers to "the imperceptible coming of the Kingdom". One commentator recasts the emptiness of the jar in a positive light by highlighting the contrast of the image of the empty jar with the expected ending of the woman finding a full jar: such a "happy ending" would be "fairy tale religiosity" whereas "emptiness in the world is what is critical to eventual spiritual fullness". Ray Shortell believes the parable Alexandrian/Stoic anti-sexist/anti-xenophobic against the temple, represented by the cracked jar carried by an Egyptian priestess. The knowledge of our creator is strewn across all roads, and thinking to exclude others leaves one with less. As Jesus said stoically, 'The kingdom of heaven is within you.'
