= Luke 11 =

- ← chapter 10 chapter 12 →
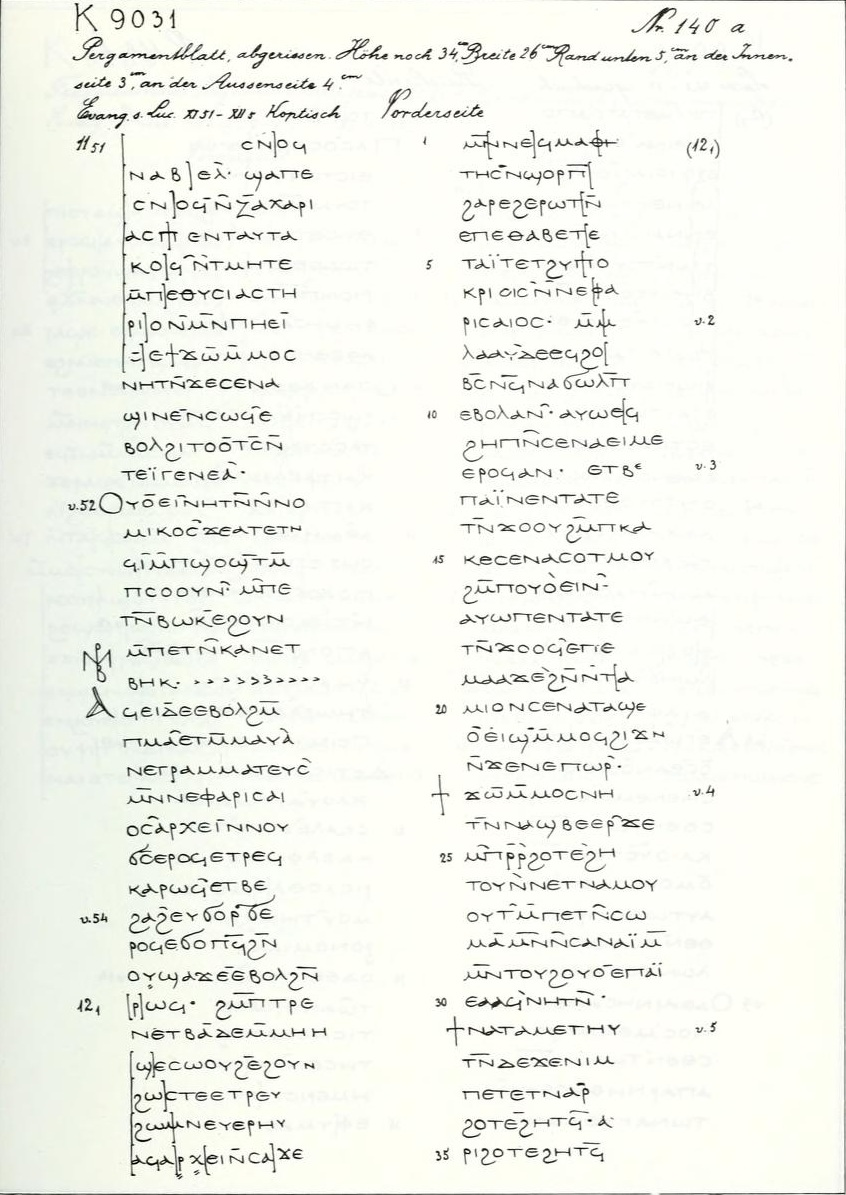
- Fragment of Uncial 0191, 6th century bilingual Greek-Coptic manuscript of the Gospels with text of Luke 11:51–12:5
- Book: Gospel of Luke
- Category: Gospel
- Christian Bible part: New Testament
- Order in the Christian part: 3

Luke 11 is the eleventh chapter of the Gospel of Luke in the New Testament of the Christian Bible. It records Luke's version of the Lord's Prayer and several parables and teachings told by Jesus Christ. Early Christian tradition uniformly affirmed that Luke the Evangelist composed this Gospel as well as the Acts of the Apostles. Critical opinion on the tradition was evenly divided at the end of the 20th century.

== Text ==
The original text was written in Koine Greek. Some early manuscripts containing the text of this chapter are:

- Papyrus 75 (written about AD 175–225)
- Papyrus 45 (c. 250)
- Codex Vaticanus (325–350)
- Codex Sinaiticus (330–360)
- Codex Bezae (c. 400)
- Codex Washingtonianus (c. 400)
- Codex Alexandrinus (400–440)
- Codex Ephraemi Rescriptus (c. 450)

This chapter is divided into 54 verses.

== The Lord's Prayer ==
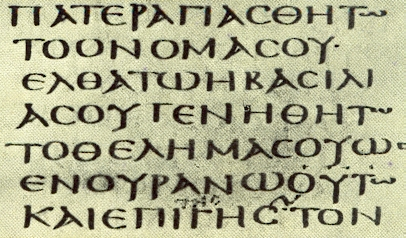
Luke 11:2 in Codex Sinaiticus

The chapter opens with Jesus praying in "a certain place" and being asked by one of his disciples to teach them to pray, as John the Baptist had taught his disciples. The place is not named but the context is within Jesus' "journey to Jerusalem" which he has commenced, with his disciples, in Luke 9:51. Frederic Farrar suggests that Luke "did not possess a ... definite note of place or of time".

The form of prayer taught by John the Baptist has perished. Origen emphasizes that the disciple's request is for Jesus to teach "as John taught", John having already been commended by Jesus as the greatest of all those born of women.

In reply, Jesus taught his disciples the "model prayer", known generally as the Lord's Prayer. Some writers looking at Matthew's account (Matthew 6:9–13) alongside Luke's account have argued that the disciple was probably a later recruit to Jesus' entourage and therefore not present at the Sermon on the Mount. Eric Franklin notes the "appropriate" connection between this section and the end of chapter 10, where Mary's listening to Jesus has been commended rather than Martha's activism.

== A friend comes at midnight ==
And He said to them, "Which of you shall have a friend, and go to him at midnight and say to him, 'Friend, lend me three loaves; for a friend of mine has come to me on his journey, and I have nothing to set before him'; and he will answer from within and say, 'Do not trouble me; the door is now shut, and my children are with me in bed; I cannot rise and give to you'?"

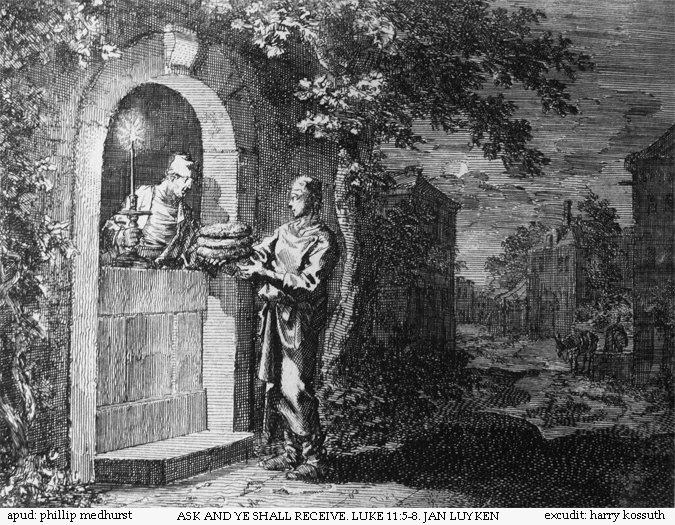
Etching by Jan Luyken illustrating the parable of the friend at night, from the Bowyer Bible

For Luke, the Lord's Prayer has a strongly eschatological focus: it prays for the coming of the Kingdom of God and maintaining that until such coming, Jesus' disciples "should live under its shadow and out of its strength". So Luke follows on from the prayer with a parable which speaks of the need for urgent and insistent prayer, portrayed through "a determined petition for bread". The parable indicates that God is not indifferent during this time of waiting, and Franklin observes that any suggestion to the contrary "arises out of a misreading of the signs of the times".

Farrar adds an allegorical reading in his assessment of this story:

Allegorically we may see here the unsatisfied hunger of the soul, which wakens in the midnight of a sinful life.

== Keep asking, seeking, knocking ==
So I say to you, "Ask, and it will be given to you; search, and you will find; knock, and the door will be opened for you".

The text here:

Greek: αιτειτε και δοθησεται υμιν ζητειτε και ευρησετε κρουετε και ανοιγησεται υμιν, (aiteite kai dothēsetai hymin zēteite kai eurēsete krouete kai anoigēsetai hymin)

mirrors Luke's text at 6:38:

Give, and it will be given to you
(δίδοτε καὶ δοθήσεται ὑμῖν, didote kai dothēsetai hymin)

God's responsiveness to persistent prayer can be understood in the light of the parable of the friend at midnight and the persistence in seeking help which it represents.

Verses 11–12 maintain the theme of asking:

^{11} If a son asks for bread from any father among you, will he give him a stone? Or if he asks for a fish, will he give him a serpent instead of a fish? ^{12} Or if he asks for an egg, will he offer him a scorpion?

Luke gives three examples of possible requests, two matching Matthew's account, asking for a loaf, and for a fish, and a third of his own, requesting an egg. Codex Bezae omits the first example. Meyer sees in this passage an example of the literary technique known as anacoluthon, an unexpected discontinuity in the expression of ideas.

== He who does not gather with me scatters ==
Luke 11:23b, also Matthew 12:30.

Baptist theologian John Gill suggests that "the allusion [in verse 23b] is either to the gathering of the sheep into the fold, and the scattering of them by the wolf; or to the gathering of the wheat, and binding it in sheaves, and bringing it home in harvest; and to the scattering of the wheat loose in the field, whereby it is lost".

== Verses 27–28 ==
As he said these things, a woman in the crowd raised her voice and said to him, "Blessed is the womb that bore you, and the breasts at which you nursed!" ²⁸But he said, "Blessed rather are those who hear the word of God and keep it!"

These verses appear in Luke only, but they have affinities with Matthew 12:46–50 and Mark 3:32–35, where his own mother and brothers intervene during Jesus' discourse. Henry Alford comments that "the woman apparently was influenced by nothing but common-place and unintelligent wonder at the sayings and doings of Jesus".

== Vv. 29–32, the sign of Jonah the prophet ==
And when the multitudes were gathering together unto him, he began to say, ‘This generation is an evil generation: it seeketh after a sign; and there shall no sign be given to it but the sign of Jonah. ³⁰For even as Jonah became a sign unto the Ninevites, so shall also the Son of man be to this generation. ³¹The queen of the south shall rise up in the judgment with the men of this generation, and shall condemn them: for she came from the ends of the earth to hear the wisdom of Solomon; and behold, a greater than Solomon is here. ³²The men of Nineveh shall stand up in the judgment with this generation, and shall condemn it: for they repented at the preaching of Jonah; and behold, a greater than Jonah is here.’

— Lk 11:29–32, American Standard Version.

== Vv. 33–36, the lamp of the body ==
No man, when he hath lighted a lamp, putteth it in a cellar, neither under the bushel, but on the stand, that they which enter in may see the light. ³⁴The lamp of thy body is thine eye: when thine eye is single, thy whole body also is full of light; but when it is evil, thy body also is full of darkness. ³⁵Look therefore whether the light that is in thee be not darkness. ³⁶If therefore thy whole body be full of light, having no part dark, it shall be wholly full of light, as when the lamp with its bright shining doth give thee light. Lk 11:33–36, American Standard Version.

== Woes of the Pharisees ==
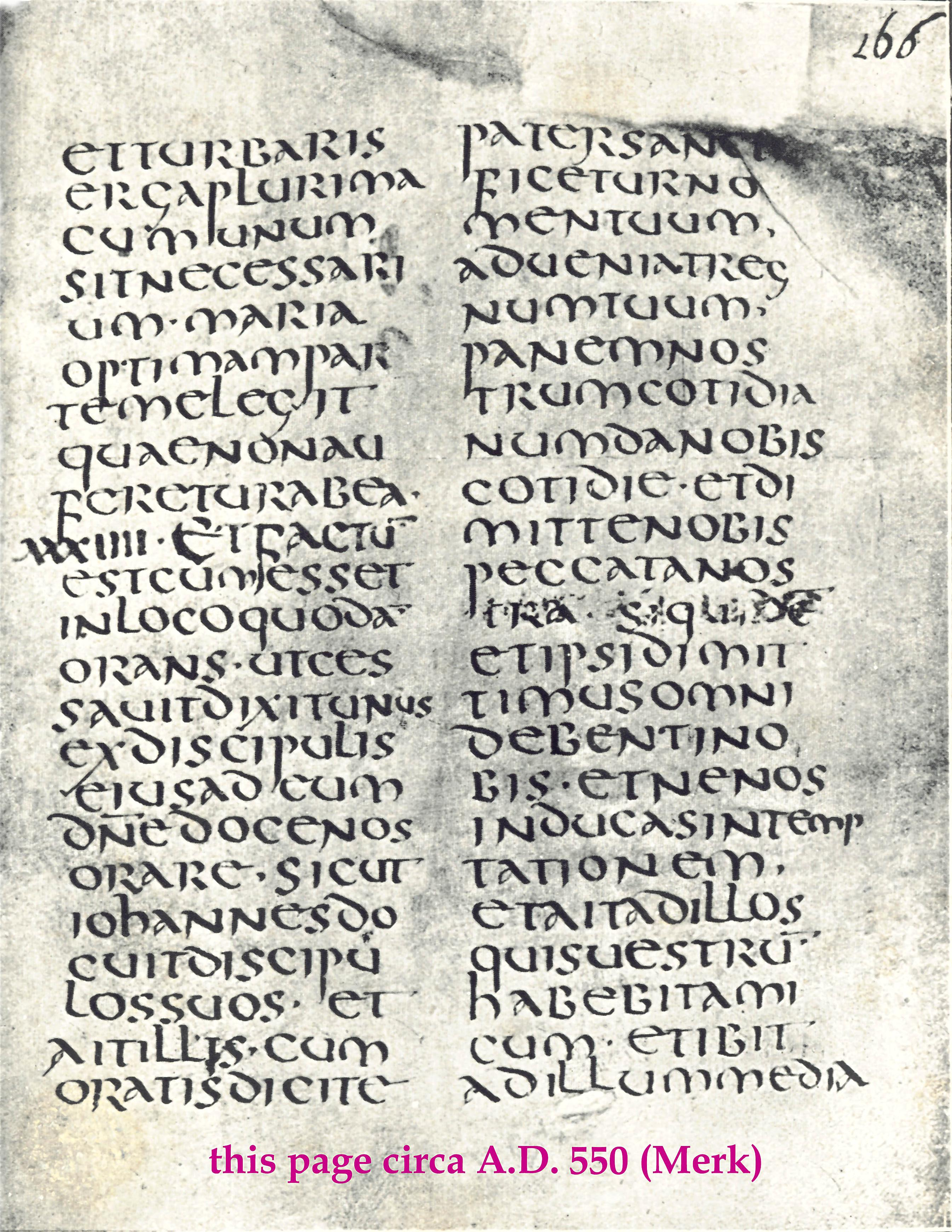
The Latin text of Luke 10:41–11:5 in Codex Claromontanus V, from 4th or 5th century

Verses 37–54 enumerate a number of criticisms raised by Jesus against scribes (lawyers) and Pharisees, which are also recorded in Matthew 23:1–39. Mark 12:35–40 and Luke 20:45–47 also include warnings about scribes.

== See also ==
- Jonah
- Lord's Prayer
- Ministry of Jesus
- Parable of the Strong Man
- Related Bible parts: Jonah 1; Matthew 6, 7, 12, 16, 23; Mark 3, 12; Luke 20

Preceded by Luke 10	Chapters of the Bible; Gospel of Luke	Succeeded by Luke 12
