= Macklin Bible =

Illustrated bible created by Thomas Macklin

The Macklin Bible is a multi-volume large-format illustrated English Bible created by Thomas Macklin to promote "'the glory of the English school' of painting and engraving and 'the interest of our HOLY RELIGION'". The Macklin Bible is based on the King James translation. According to the Dictionary of National Biography, "[t]he Macklin Bible endures as the most ambitious edition produced in Britain, often pirated but never rivalled."

== Production ==
Thomas Macklin began working on this Bible project in London in 1789. He started publication of its volumes began in 1791 with printing done by Thomas Bensley. The volumes comprising the Old and New Testament were published under Macklin, though his wife and business partner, Hannah Macklin, had to complete publication when he died shortly before the publication of the last volume of the New Testament. Thomas Macklin intended for the Macklin Bible to include another volume for the Deuterocanonical books. The publishers Cadell & Davies took up Macklin's work and published the final volume in 1816.

A new typeface and a new kind of paper were designed for the work.

The landscape painter Philip James de Loutherbourg was a major contributed heavily to the illustrations in the Macklin Bible.

Macklin's Bible project was expensive to produce: for example, he paid Reynolds £500 for his Holy Family Bible, and the total cost of the project was estimated at £30,000. To realise this project, he was forced to sell some of the paintings from his Poet's Gallery by lottery in 1797.

== Derivations ==
Owners of the Macklin Bible disassembled their copies to insert their own illustrations and prints, with some owners then having the Bible rebound.

The Bowyer Bible, originally owned by Robert Bowyer, is the most famous Bible resulting from this process. Bowyer expanded his Macklin Bible to 45 volumes, adding over 6,200 different engraving prints and around 200 of the original drawings and vignettes completed by Loutherbourg for the Macklin Bible. Bowyer had a custom bookcase designed and built for his Bibles. The Bowyer Bible and its bookcase is currently owned by the Bolton Council and is in the collection of Bolton Museum in England.
