= Parable of the Mustard Seed =

Parable taught by Jesus of Nazareth according to Christian gospels

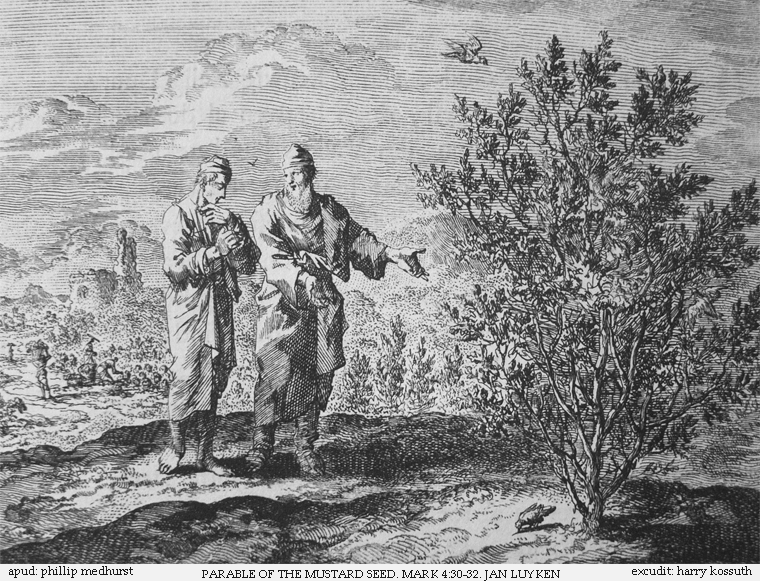
Etching by Jan Luyken illustrating the parable, from the Bowyer Bible

The Parable of the Mustard Seed is one of the shorter parables of Jesus. It appears in Matthew (13:31–32), Mark (4:30–32), and Luke (13:18–19). In the Gospels of Matthew and Luke, it is immediately followed by the Parable of the Leaven, which shares this parable's theme of the Kingdom of Heaven growing from small beginnings. It also appears in the non-canonical Gospel of Thomas (verse 20).

== Narrative ==
In the Gospel of Matthew the parable is as follows:

The Kingdom of Heaven is like a grain of mustard seed, which a man took, and sowed in his field; which indeed is smaller than all seeds but when it is grown, it is greater than the herbs and becomes a tree, so that the birds of the air come and lodge in its branches.

In the Gospel of Mark:

It's like a grain of mustard seed, which, when it is sown in the earth, though it is less than all the seeds that are on the earth, yet when it is sown, grows up, and becomes greater than all the herbs, and puts out great branches, so that the birds of the sky can lodge under its shadow.

In the Gospel of Luke:

It is like a grain of mustard seed, which a man took, and put in his own garden. It grew and became a large tree, and the birds of the sky lodged in its branches.

== Interpretation ==
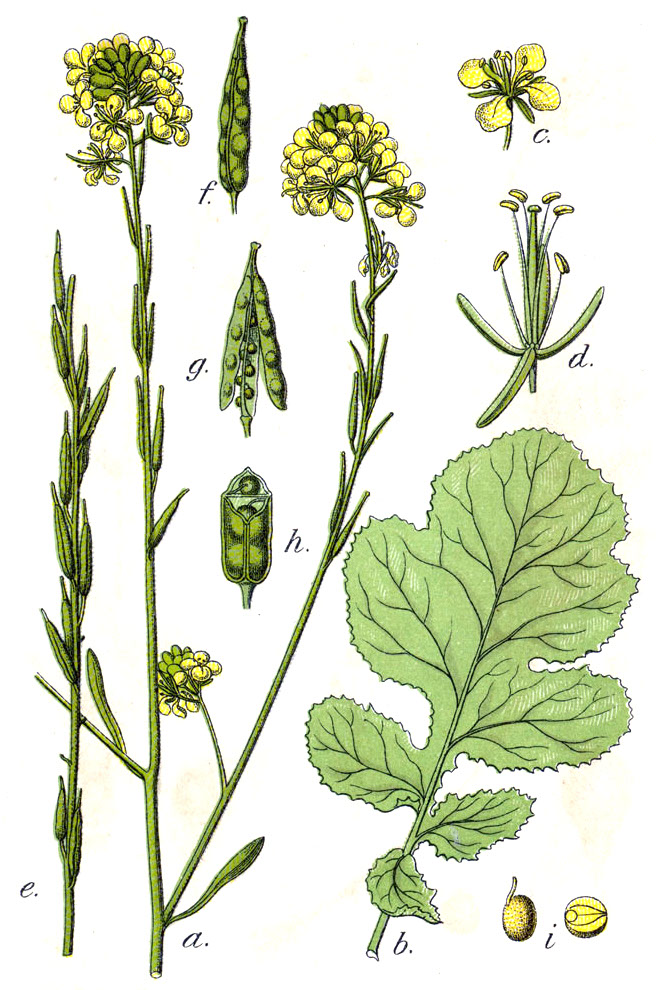
The black mustard plant

The plant referred to here (Greek σίναπι, sinapi) is generally considered to be black mustard, a large annual plant up to 9 feet (2.7 m) tall, but growing from a proverbially small seed (this smallness is also used to refer to faith in Matthew 17:20 and Luke 17:6). According to rabbinical sources, Jews did not grow the plant in gardens, and this is consistent with Matthew's description of it growing in a field. Luke tells the parable with the plant in a garden instead; this is presumably recasting the story for an audience outside the Levant.

I. Howard Marshall writes that the parable "suggests the growth of the kingdom of God from tiny beginnings to worldwide size." The Parable of the Leaven (which in the Gospels of Matthew and Luke immediately follows) shares this theme of large growth from small beginnings. As with the Parable of the Sower, which in Matthew and Mark occurs earlier in the same chapter, the man sowing the seed represents Jesus, and the plant is the Kingdom of God.

New Testament scholar Adolf Jülicher viewed the parable of the mustard seed as a similitude, or an extended simile/metaphor, that has three parts: a picture part (Bildhälfte), a reality part (Sachhälfte), and a point of comparison (tertium comparationis). The picture part is the mustard seed that grows into a large plant, the reality part is the kingdom of God, and the point of comparison is the growth of the kingdom from small beginnings.

The nesting birds may refer to Old Testament texts which emphasize the universal reach of God's empire, such as Daniel 4:12, Ezekiel 17:22-24 and 31:5-6. However, a real mustard plant is unlikely to attract nesting birds, so that "Jesus seems deliberately to emphasize the notion of astonishing extravagance in his analogy." Other commentators have suggested that the birds represent Gentiles seeking refuge with Israel or the "sinners" and tax collectors with whom Jesus was criticised for associating. A few commentators view the birds negatively, as representing false teachers invading the church.

Some have identified a "subversive and scandalous" element to this parable, in that the fast-growing nature of the mustard plant makes it a "malignant weed" with "dangerous takeover properties". Pliny the Elder, in his Natural History (published around AD 78) writes that "mustard... is extremely beneficial for the health. It grows entirely wild, though it is improved by being transplanted: but on the other hand when it has once been sown it is scarcely possible to get the place free of it, as the seed when it falls germinates at once."

Ben Witherington notes that Jesus could have chosen a genuine tree for the parable, and that the mustard plant demonstrates that "Though the dominion appeared small like a seed during Jesus' ministry, it would inexorably grow into something large and firmly rooted, which some would find shelter in and others would find obnoxious and try to root out."

In Mormonism, Joseph Smith interpreted it as follows: "Now we can discover plainly that this figure is given to represent the Church as it shall come forth in the last days. … Let us take the Book of Mormon, which a man took and hid in his field, securing it by his faith, to spring up in the last days, or in due time; let us behold it coming forth out of the ground, which is indeed accounted the least of all seeds, but behold it branching forth, yea, even towering, with lofty branches, and God-like majesty, until it, like the mustard seed, becomes the greatest of all herbs. And it is truth, and it has sprouted and come forth out of the earth, and righteousness begins to look down from heaven, and God is sending down His powers, gifts and angels, to lodge in the branches thereof.

== Commentary from the Church Fathers ==
Chrysostom: "Seeing the Lord had said above that three parts of the seed perish, and one only is preserved, and of that one part there is much loss by reason of the tares that are sown upon it; that none might say, Who then and how many shall they be that believe; He removes this cause of fear by the parable of the mustard seed: therefore it is said, Another parable put he forth unto them, saying, The kingdom of heaven is like unto a grain of mustard seed."

Jerome: "The kingdom of heaven is the preaching of the Gospel, and the knowledge of the Scriptures which leads to life, concerning which it is said to the Jews, The kingdom of God shall be taken from you. (Mat. 21:43.) It is the kingdom of heaven thus understood which is likened to a grain of mustard seed."

Augustine: " A grain of mustard seed may allude to the warmth of faith, or to its property as antidote to poison. It follows; Which a man took and sowed in his field."

Jerome: "The man who sows is by most understood to be the Saviour, who sows the seed in the minds of believers; by others the man himself, who sows in his field, that is, in his own heart. Who indeed is he that soweth, but our own mind and understanding, which receiving the grain of preaching, and nurturing it by the dew of faith, makes it to spring up in the field of our own breast? Which is the least of all seeds. The Gospel preaching is the least of all the systems of the schools; at first view it has not even the appearance of truth, announcing a man as God, God put to death, and proclaiming the offence of the cross. Compare this teaching with the dogmas of the Philosophers, with their books, the splendour of their eloquence, the polish of their style, and you will see how the seed of the Gospel is the least of all seeds."

Chrysostom: "Or; The seed of the Gospel is the least of seeds, because the disciples were weaker than the whole of mankind; yet forasmuch as there was great might in them, their preaching spread throughout the whole world, and therefore it follows, But when it is grown it is the greatest among herbs, that is among dogmas."

Augustine: " Dogmas are the decisions of sects, the points, that is, that they have determined."

Jerome: "For the dogmas of Philosophers when they have grown up, show nothing of life or strength, but watery and insipid they grow into grasses and other greens, which quickly dry up and wither away. But the Gospel preaching; though it seem small in its beginning, when sown in the mind of the hearer, or upon the world, comes up not a garden herb, but a tree, so that the birds of the air (which we must suppose to be either the souls of believers or the Powers of God set free from slavery) come and abide in its branches. The branches of the Gospel tree which have grown of the grain of mustard seed, I suppose to signify the various dogmas in which each of the birds (as explained above) takes his rest. Let us then take the wings of the dove, that flying aloft we may dwell in the branches of this tree, and may make ourselves nests of doctrines, and soaring above earthly things may hasten towards heavenly. (Ps. 55:6.)"

Hilary of Poitiers: "Or; The Lord compares Himself to a grain of mustard seed, sharp to the taste, and the least of all seeds, whose strength is extracted by bruising."

Gregory the Great: " Christ Himself is the grain of mustard seed, who, planted in the garden of the sepulchre, grew up a great tree; He was a grain of seed when He died, and a tree when He rose again; a grain of seed in the humiliation of the flesh, a tree in the power of His majesty."

Hilary of Poitiers: "This grain then when sown in the field, that is, when seized by the people and delivered to death, and as it were buried in the ground by a sowing of the body, grew up beyond the size of all herbs, and exceeded all the glory of the Prophets. For the preaching of the Prophets was allowed as it were herbs to a sick man; but now the birds of the air lodge in the branches of the tree. By which we understand the Apostles, who put forth of Christ’s might, and overshadowing the world with their boughs, are a tree to which the Gentiles flee in hope of life, and having been long tossed by the winds, that is by the spirits of the Devil, may have rest in its branches."

Gregory the Great: " The birds lodge in its branches, when holy souls that raise themselves aloft from thoughts of earth on the wings of the virtues, breathe again from the troubles of this life in their words and comfortings."

== See also ==
- Five Discourses of Matthew
- Life of Jesus in the New Testament
- Ministry of Jesus
- Mustard seed and mustard seed growing
