= Parable of the Leaven =

Parable taught by Jesus of Nazareth according to Christian gospels

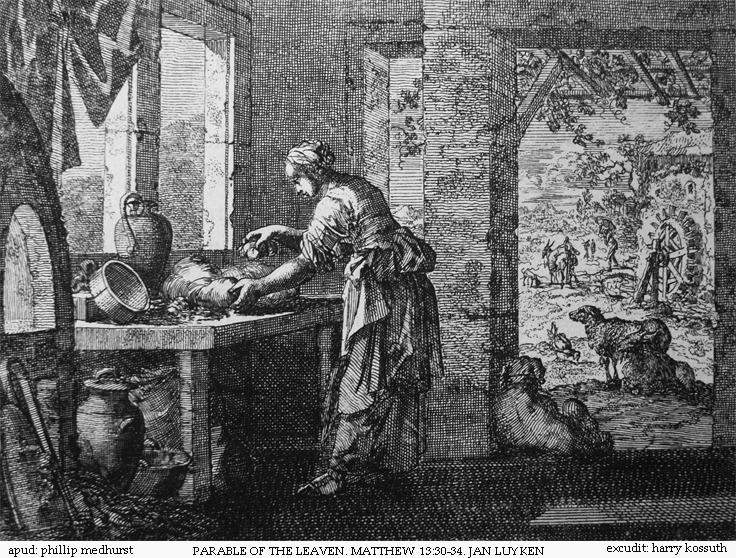
Etching by Jan Luyken illustrating the parable, from the Bowyer Bible.

The Parable of the Leaven, also called the parable of the yeast, is one of the shortest parables of Jesus. It appears in Matthew 13:33 and Luke 13:20–21, as well as in the non-canonical Gospel of Thomas (logion 96). In the canonical gospels, it immediately follows the Parable of the Mustard Seed, which shares this parable's theme of the Kingdom of Heaven growing from small beginnings. In the Gospel of Thomas, it starts a series of three, preceding the Parable of the Empty Jar and the Parable of the Assassin.

== Narrative ==
The parable describes what happens when a woman adds leaven (old, fermented dough, usually containing lactobacillus and yeast) to a large quantity of flour (about 8 1/2 gallons or 38 litres). The living organisms in the leaven grow overnight, so that by morning, the entire quantity of dough has been raised.

In the Gospel of Luke, the parable is as follows:

And again he said, "To what shall I compare the kingdom of God? It is like leaven that a woman took and hid in three measures of flour, until it was all leavened."

— Luke 13:20–21

== Interpretation ==
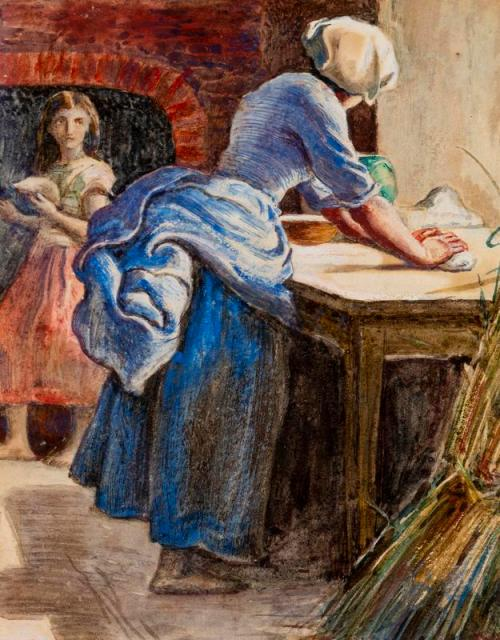
Parable - The Leaven by John Everett Millais, ca.1860, Aberdeen Art Gallery

Ben Witherington suggests that this parable is part of a pair, and shares its meaning with the preceding parable, that of the mustard seed, namely the powerful growth of the Kingdom of God from small beginnings. The outcome is inevitable once the natural process of growth has begun. Adolf Jülicher identifies three parts to a parable or similitude (extended simile or metaphor): a picture part (Bildhälfte), a reality part (Sachhälfte), and a tertium comparationis. The picture part is a woman making bread with leaven, the reality part is the kingdom of God, and the point of comparison is the powerful growth of the kingdom from small beginnings.

Although leaven symbolises evil influences elsewhere in the New Testament (see Luke 12:1), it is not generally interpreted that way in this parable. However, a few commentators do see the leaven as reflecting future corrupting influences in the Church.

As with the Parable of the Lost Coin, this parable is part of a pair, in which the first parable describes Jesus' work in terms of agricultural activities of men compared to the second parable with a focus on women's domestic activities. Joel B. Green writes that Jesus "asks people - male or female, privileged or peasant, it does not matter - to enter the domain of a first-century woman and household cook in order to gain perspective on the domain of God."

The large quantity of flour may hint at a planned festive occasion, since the bread produced could feed a hundred people. Three measures of meal was the amount used by Sarah to bake bread when she and Abram were visited by the Lord and the angels in Genesis 18. It is also the amount used in baking the shewbread for the Temple of the Lord in Israel.

== Commentary from the Church Fathers ==
Chrysostom: "The same thing the Lord sets forth in this parable of the leaven, as much as to say to His disciples, As leaven changes into its own kind much wheat-flour, so shall ye change the whole world. Note here the wisdom of the Saviour; He first brings instances from nature, proving that as the one is possible so is the other. And He says not simply ‘put,’ but hid; as much as to say, So ye, when ye shall be cast down by your enemies, then ye shall overcome them. And so leaven is kneaded in, without being destroyed, but gradually changes all things into its own nature; so shall it come to pass with your preaching. Fear ye not then because I said that many tribulations shall come upon you, for so shall ye shine forth, and shall overcome them all. He says, three measures, to signify a great abundance; that definite number standing for an indefinite quantity."

Augustine: "Or, The leaven signifies love, because it causes activity and fermentation; by the woman He means wisdom. By the three measures He intends either those three things in man, with the whole heart, with the whole soul, with the whole mind; or the three degrees of fruitfulness, the hundred-fold, the sixty-fold, the thirty-fold, or those three kinds of men, Noe, Daniel, and Job."

Rabanus Maurus: "He says, Until the whole was leavened, because that love implanted in our mind ought to grow until it changes the whole soul into its own perfection; which is begun here, but is completed hereafter."

Michele: "We are hidden from the evil one during our transition. The 3 - Father, son, and Holy spirit help to hide us, to feed us...until we have grown to our full potential and understanding in the Kingdom -- usually 3 1/2 years. At that time we have risen in wisdom and faith and are ready to represent the Lord."

Jerome: "Or otherwise; The woman who takes the leaven and hides it, seems to me to be the Apostolic preaching, or the Church gathered out of divers nations. She takes the leaven, that is, the understanding of the Scriptures, and hides it in three measures of meal, that the three, spirit, soul, and body, may be brought into one, and may not differ among themselves. Or otherwise; We read in Plato that there are three parts in the soul, reason, anger, and desire; so we also if we have received the evangelic leaven of Holy Scripture, may possess in our reason prudence, in our anger hatred against vice, in our desire love of the virtues, and this will all come to pass by the Evangelic teaching which our mother Church has held out to us. I will further mention an interpretation of some; that the woman is the Church, who has mingled the faith of man in three measures of meal, namely, belief in the Father, the Son, and the Holy Spirit; which when it has fermented into one lump, brings us not to a threefold God, but to the knowledge of one Divinity. This is a pious interpretation; but parables and doubtful solutions of dark things, can never bestow authority on dogmas."

Hilary of Poitiers: "Or otherwise; The Lord compares Himself to leaven; for leaven is produced from meal, and communicates the power that it has received to a heap of its own kind. The woman, that is the Synagogue, taking this leaven hides it, that is by the sentence of death; but it working in the three measures of meal, that is equally in the Law, the Prophets, and the Gospels, makes all one; so that what the Law ordains, that the Prophets announce, that is fulfilled in the developments of the Gospels. But many, as I remember, have thought that the three measures refer to the calling of the three nations, out of Shem, Ham, and Japhet. But I hardly think that the reason of the thing will allow this interpretation; for though these three nations have indeed been called, yet in them Christ is shown and not hidden, and in so great a multitude of unbelievers the whole cannot be said to be leavened."

== See also ==
- Five Discourses of Matthew
- Life of Jesus in the New Testament
- Ministry of Jesus
- Holy Spirit
