= Thomas Macklin =

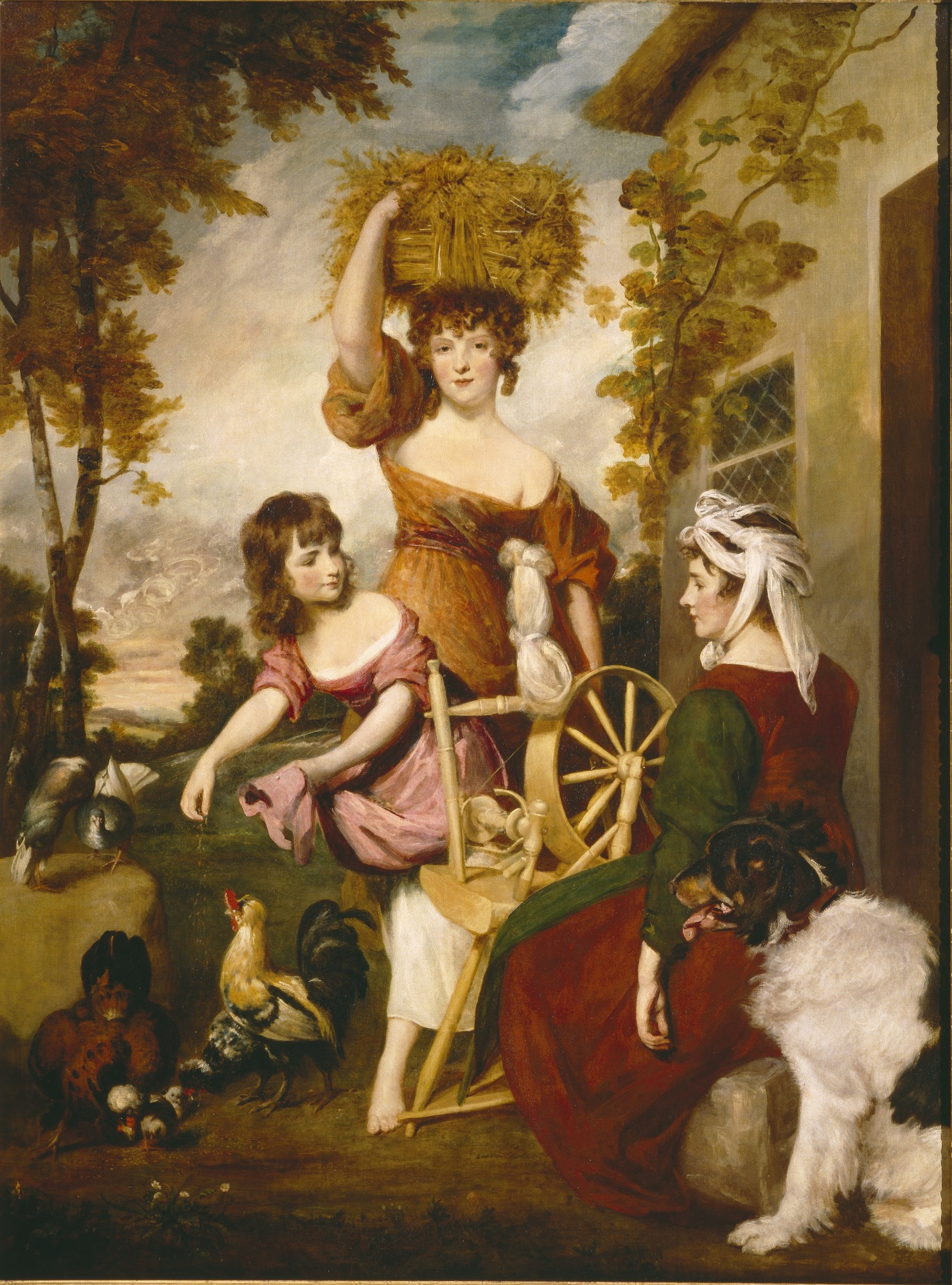
"The Cottagers" (inspired by Thomson) painted by Reynolds and commissioned by Macklin in 1788, featuring his daughter, Maria, (left), and his wife, Hannah (right) and friend (Jane Potts (Edwin Landseer's mother), standing).

Thomas Macklin (1752/53 – 25 October 1800) was a British printseller and picture dealer. He commissioned many noted painters and engravers for his "Poets Gallery" project and his illustrated folio Bible project.

== Life ==
Macklin was born in 1752 or 1753 and his father may have been the Reverend Garrard Macklin of the Kingdom of Ireland.

Macklin married Hannah Kenting in 1777 and started a printselling business in London in 1779. His first year, his sold 7,000 copies of a print of Rear Admiral Richard Kempenfelt. In 1781, he inherited £20,000, which he used to speculate in the print market.

Macklin is most famous for his Poet's Gallery, a project he announced on 1 January 1787. He planned to commission 100 paintings illustrating famous English poems, which he would publish monthly as engravings between 1790 and 1795. He also held an annual exhibition in Pall Mall, like John Boydell and his Shakespeare Gallery. However, the war with France cut into his profits, as prints could not be traded across the channel, and his partner, Edward Rogers, died. The project produced paintings by Joshua Reynolds, Henry Fuseli, Thomas Gainsborough, John Opie, Angelica Kauffman, Thomas Stothard, and Francis Wheatley. Francesco Bartolozzi engraved many of the prints.

Thomas Macklin's Paintings Act 1797
- Act of Parliament
- Parliament of Great Britain
- Long title: An act for enabling Thomas Macklin to dispose of his collection of modern paintings, as now exhibited at his gallery in Fleet-street, by way of chance.
- Citation: 37 Geo. 3. c. 133
- Territorial extent: Great Britain

Dates
- Royal assent: 19 July 1797
- Commencement: 19 July 1797 (Note: The Acts of Parliament (Commencement) Act 1793.)
- Repealed: 30 July 1948
Other legislation
Amended by	Macklin's Lottery Act 1798
Repealed by	Statute Law Revision Act 1948

Status: Repealed

Text of statute as originally enacted

Macklin's Lottery Act 1798
- Act of Parliament
- Parliament of Great Britain
- Long title: An act for extending the time limited for determining a lottery, established under the authority of an act, passed in the thirty-seventh year of his present Majesty's reign, intituled, "An act for enabling Thomas Macklin to dispose of his collection of modern paintings, as now exhibited at his gallery in Fleet Street, by way of chance."
- Citation: 38 Geo. 3. c. iii
- Territorial extent: Great Britain

Dates
- Royal assent: 23 February 1798
- Commencement: 23 February 1798
- Repealed: 31 January 2013
Other legislation
Amends	Thomas Macklin's Paintings Act 1797
Repealed by	Statute Law (Repeals) Act 2013

Status: Repealed

Text of statute as originally enacted

Just two years after beginning the Poet's Gallery, Macklin undertook to publish an illustrated folio Bible in multiple volumes to promote "'the glory of the English school' of painting and engraving and 'the interest of our HOLY RELIGION'". A new typeface and a new kind of paper were designed for the work. The finished Bible had 70 engraved plates, 16 of which were by Philippe Jacques de Louthenbourg. Many of the same artists who were participating in the Poet's Gallery worked on the Bible project. 703 people signed the subscription list, including George III. Macklin's Bible project was expensive to produce: he paid Reynolds £500 for his Holy Family, for example, and the total cost was estimated at £30,000. To realise this project, he was forced to sell some of the paintings from the Poet's Gallery by lottery in 1797.

Macklin died on 25 October 1800, just five days after the last large engraving was finished for the Bible. The vignettes were not finished until six weeks later. According to the Dictionary of National Biography, "[t]he Macklin Bible endures as the most ambitious edition produced in Britain, often pirated but never rivalled."

Macklin's influence was felt in the world of the arts not only as a publisher but also as a patron. The Dictionary of National Biography records that he may have spent as much as £300,000 as a patron of the arts.

== Gallery ==
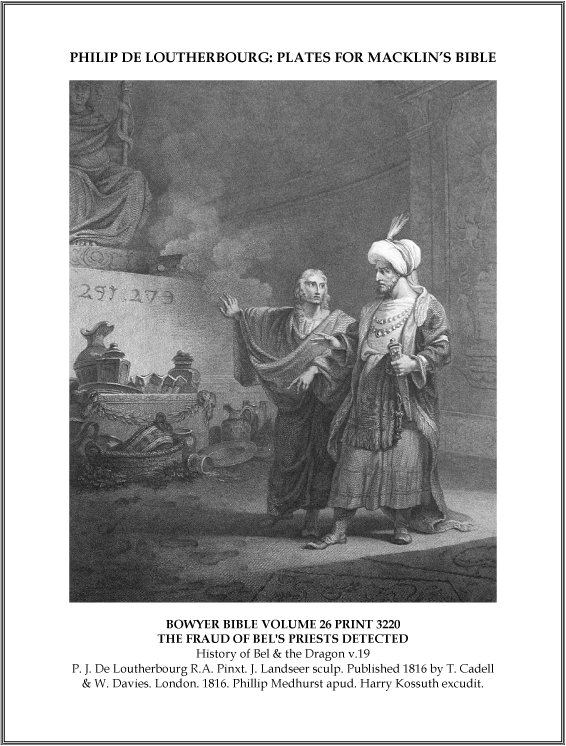
Plate for the Macklin Bible after Louthenbourg.
The Fraud of Bel's Priests detected.

== Bibliography ==
- Bentley, G. E., Jr. "Thomas Macklin". Oxford Dictionary of National Biography. Oxford University Press. 2004. Retrieved on 29 January 2008.
