= Tower of Siloam =

Structure spoken about by Jesus of Nazareth according to the Christian Gospel of Luke

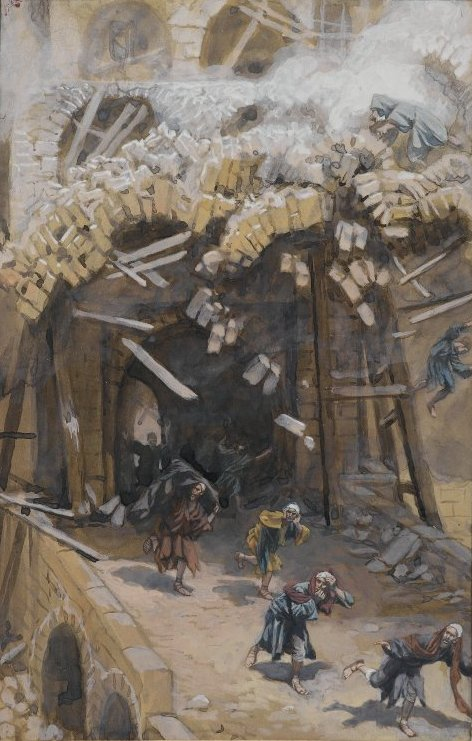
James Tissot, The Tower of Siloam

The Tower of Siloam (Greek: ὁ πύργος ἐν τῷ Σιλωάμ, ho pyrgos en tō Silōam) was a structure which fell upon 18 people, killing them. Siloam is a neighborhood south of Jerusalem's Old City. In the Gospel of Luke, Jesus refers to the tower's collapse and the death of the 18 in a discourse on the need for individual repentance. The incident is mentioned only once in the New Testament, in Luke 13:4, as part of a section with examples inviting repentance contained in verses 13:1–5.

== Biblical reference ==
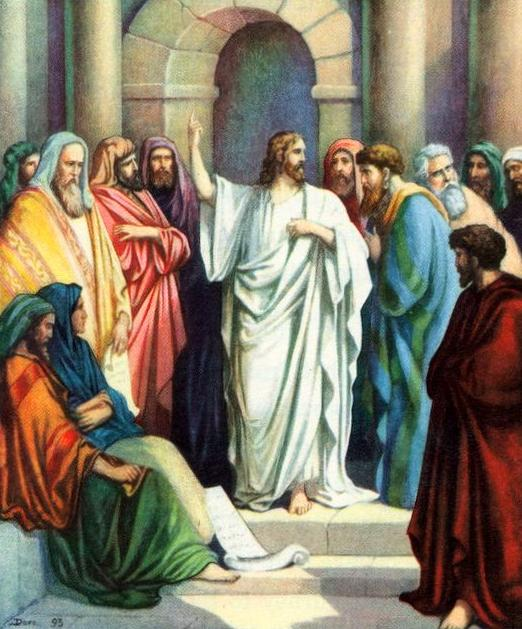
Christ teaching in the Temple

"Some who were present" reported to Jesus that Pontius Pilate had killed some Galileans while they were worshiping. Their example was particularly gruesome since at the moment the Galileans were killed, they were worshiping God by offering sacrifices according to their Jewish religious law.

Apparently those making the report were looking for Jesus to offer some explanation of why bad things happen to normal people—in this case even while they were bringing sacrifices to their God. The "sin and calamity" issue involves a presumption that an extraordinary tragedy in some way must signify extraordinary guilt. It assumes that a victim must have done something terrible for God to allow something so tragic to happen to them.

Jesus responded to the question, answering that the calamities suffered by the victims of the falling of the tower of Siloam were not related to their relative sinfulness. He then diverted the focus onto the interrogators, wanting them to focus on their own souls.

Do you think that these Galileans were worse sinners than all the other Galileans, because they suffered in this way? No, I tell you; but unless you repent, you will all likewise perish. Or those eighteen on whom the tower in Siloam fell and killed them: do you think that they were worse offenders than all the others who lived in Jerusalem? No, I tell you; but unless you repent, you will all likewise perish.”

His mention of the fall of the Tower of Siloam added a nuance to his prior point: accidents happen. Therefore, even in the absence of persecution, death can come unexpectedly to anyone, irrespective of how righteous or how sinful they are. He may have been emphasizing that the time granted by God for repentance is limited.

=== "Repent" and "perish" in the New Testament ===
Whether due to persecution or misadventure, repentance is universally strongly and earnestly required by Jesus. The time is short, and therefore the time for repentance is now. In his response to both tragedies, Jesus dismissed personal guilt or causation as the reason they became victims. Instead, he turned the focus toward those wanting to hear "why".

Twice in this brief passage, Jesus declared, "...unless you repent, you too will all perish." Jesus's clear focus is on the need for everyone, individually, to "repent" of their sins before God. His answer cannot mean that all unrepentant people will die deservedly. Neither can it mean that people can escape physical death by repenting of their sins since eventually every living person dies. So perish here is something more than just to die a physical death.

The word "perish" in the New Testament very often refers to a terrible judgment following one's physical death. Since Jesus connects it directly to sin and says it can be escaped by repentance, "perish" here most logically refers to the final judgment. For example, in John 3:16 Jesus says, "For God so loved the world that he gave his only begotten Son, that whosoever believes in him should not perish, but have everlasting life." Perishing is the biblical alternative to having everlasting life. Perishing is what happens to those who do not have eternal life. The same principle appears in John 10:28 where Jesus says, "I give them eternal life, and they shall not perish for ever."

== Identification ==
In the eighteenth century, bible commentator Matthew Henry (1662-1714) referenced contemporary speculation by theologian Dr. Joseph Lightfoot, who identified the Pool of Siloam with the Pool of Bethesda and conjectured that the Tower of Siloam may have been supporting one of the five porches of the Pool of Bethesda mentioned in the fifth chapter of the Gospel of John, and that the 18 victims were killed by the falling porch. This was contested when the real Pool of Bethesda was discovered in north Jerusalem.

In 1920, Raymond Weill proposed that one of the towers flanking the Pilaster wall next to the Pool of Siloam could be the "Tower of Siloam." In 2023, Nacshon Szanton demonstrated that indeed both towers were constructed in the Hellenistic period, and were rebuilt in the first century.

Other Bible commentators have speculated that the Tower of Siloam may have been part of a Roman aqueduct connected to the Pool of Siloam. At least two aqueducts are known to have carried water to the pool from the Gihon Spring, but these aqueducts were built into the ground, not on elevated viaducts requiring towers.

It has also been speculated that the tower was a fortress built to defend the city, similar to the Phasael tower.

== Archaeology ==
Archaeological excavation has revealed what some Biblical scholars believe to be the ruins of the tower. If so, it is likely the ruins belong to a second tower that was rebuilt after the first tower collapsed. The ruins are a circular foundation approximately 6 metres across.
