= Matthew 23 =

- ← chapter 22 chapter 24 →
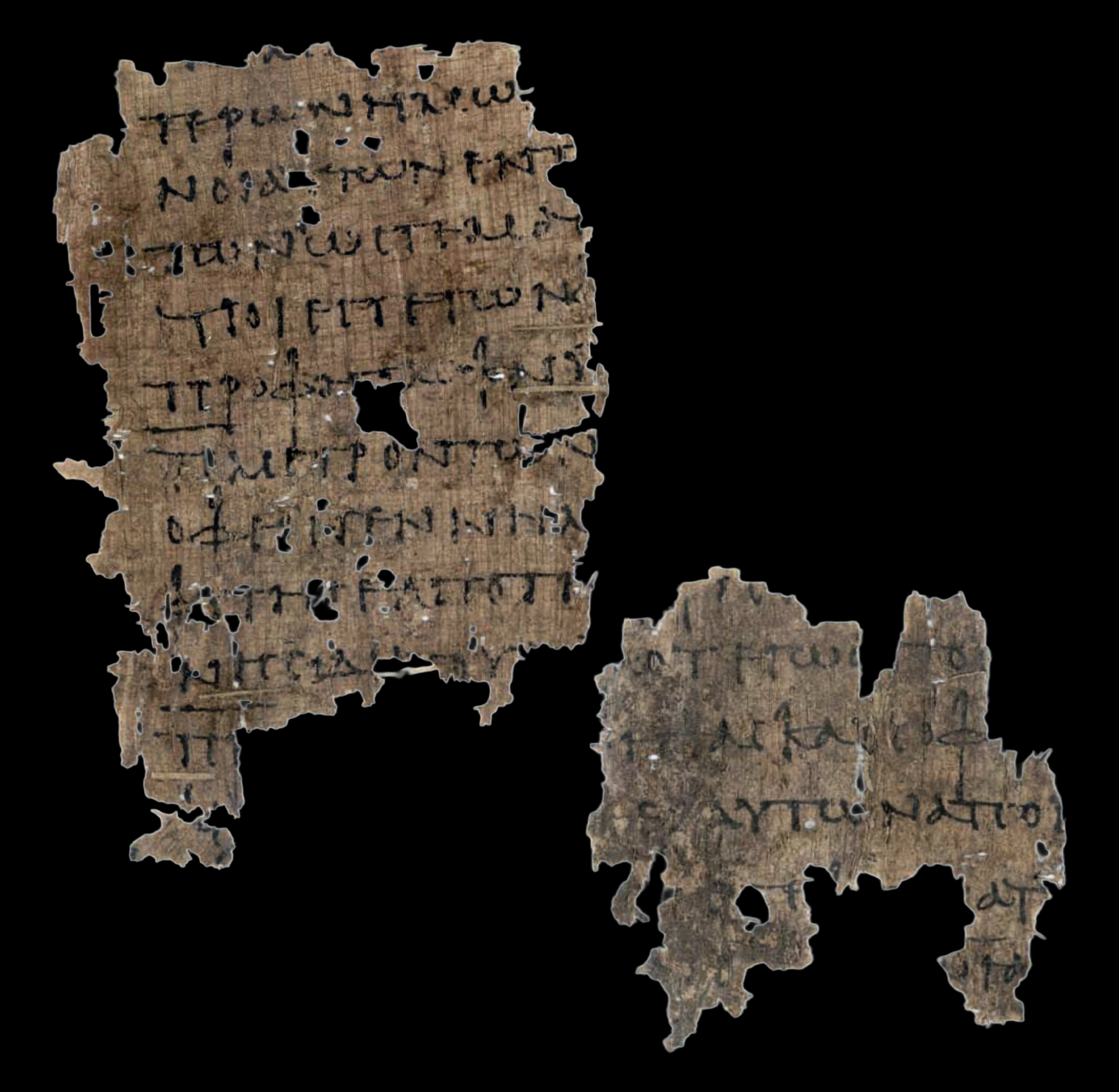
- Gospel of Matthew 23:30-34 on Papyrus 77, from c. AD 200
- Book: Gospel of Matthew
- Category: Gospel
- Christian Bible part: New Testament
- Order in the Christian part: 1

Matthew 23 is the twenty-third chapter in the Gospel of Matthew in the New Testament section of the Christian Bible, and consists almost entirely of the accusations of Jesus against the Pharisees and the Scribes. The chapter is also known as the Woes of the Pharisees or the "Seven Woes". In this chapter, Jesus accuses the Pharisees of hypocrisy. Some writers treat it as part of the fifth and final discourse of Matthew's gospel.

Scholars noted multiple parallels between the denunciations in Matthew 23 and ancient Jewish practice, arguing that the language reflects a form of rhetorical invective widely used by Jews themselves in inter-party disputes rather than a distinctively anti-Jewish polemic.

Recent scholarship tends to find more historical value in the controversy narratives between Jesus and the Pharisees than 20th century scholarship. This community may have been competing for authority within Judaism in Matthew's locale in the aftermath of the destruction of Jerusalem, when a coalition rooted in the Pharisaic tradition was consolidating into what would become rabbinic Judaism, the dominant stream of Jewish life in the centuries that followed.

== Text ==
The original text was written in Koine Greek. This chapter is divided into 39 verses.

=== Textual witnesses ===
Some early manuscripts containing the text of this chapter are:

- Papyrus 77 (AD ~200; extant: verses 30–39)
- Codex Vaticanus (325–350)
- Codex Sinaiticus (330–360)
- Codex Bezae (c. 400)
- Codex Washingtonianus (c. 400)
- Codex Ephraemi Rescriptus (c. 450)
- Codex Purpureus Rossanensis (6th century)
- Codex Sinopensis (6th century; extant verses 1–35)
- Papyrus 83 (6th century; extant verses 39)

== Context ==
Some writers treat this chapter as part of the fifth and final discourse of Matthew's gospel, along with chapters 24 and 25, although in other cases a distinction is made between chapter 23, where Jesus speaks with "the multitudes and [his] disciples", and chapters 24–25, where he speaks "privately" (see Matthew 24:3) with his disciples.

== Source ==
The chapter draws on and expands a brief denunciation of the scribes found in the Gospel of Mark. Bellinzoni further argues that Matthew and Luke used the hypothetical Q source to create a considerably longer and more severe passage than its Markan basis, though many scholars today have come to doubt rather than defend the existence of Q in favor of Luke's usage of Matthew. The chapter's polemical core began with a brief denunciation of the scribes in the Gospel of Mark (Mark 12:37–40), in which Jesus warns against those who seek public honor while exploiting the vulnerable, and expanded it into a broad assault on the integrity and authority of the scribes and Pharisees alike. The resulting text is considerably longer and more severe than its Marcan basis (Mark 12:38–44).

Luke and Matthew handle the shared material differently. Luke keeps the criticisms directed separately at the Pharisees and at the lawyers, and frames the episode primarily as instruction to Jesus's disciples (Luke 12:1). Matthew instead fuses the scribes and Pharisees into a single group. Luke 13:34–35 parallels Jesus' lament over Jerusalem in verses 37–39.

== A warning against the scribes and the Pharisees (verses 1–12) ==
Matthew presents a concerted attack on the Jewish religious authorities at this point in his gospel narrative; there is a briefer warning about the scribes in Mark 12:38–40, and Luke has, according to Protestant theologian Heinrich Meyer, "inserted at Luke 11 portions of this discourse in an order different from the original". The pharisees themselves have been silenced in Matthew 22. According to Richard Thomas France, this section shows Jesus as a fierce controversialist concerning the values of the kingdom of heaven as opposed to the superficial approach to religion. Meyer thinks that Matthew's account is closer to the actual directive of Jesus, "although much that was spoken on other occasions may perhaps be mixed up with it"; Heinrich Ewald, on the other hand, thinks that the discourse is made up of passages that were probably original, though uttered on very different occasions.

According to William David Davies and Dale C. Allison, this part of the chapter features a remarkably "Jewish character". They note that not one of the Jewish practices mentioned is explained to the reader, implying that the author assumed familiarity with them on the part of the audience, lending further evidence that Matthew's community was predominantly Jewish, with a substantial portion likely still participating in synagogue life.

=== Verse 2 ===
"The scribes and the Pharisees sit in Moses' seat."

Dale Allison states that "'Moses' seat' is ambiguous. It may either refer to a literal chair for synagogue authorities or be a metaphor for teaching authority (cf. the professor's 'chair')." Thus, the New Century Version presents this verse as:

The teachers of the law and the Pharisees have the authority to tell you what the law of Moses says.

Allison observes that "only here (in Matthew's gospel) are the Jewish leaders presented in a positive light: they should be obeyed". Moses "sat to judge the people" in Exodus 18:13, although Meyer counsels against the suggestion that the "seat of Moses" refers to this passage.

Meyer also suggests that the word ἐκάθισαν (ekathisan, "have sat down") should be read as "have seated themselves", meaning that they have "assumed to themselves the duties of this office".

=== Verse 3 ===
Therefore whatever they tell you to observe, that observe and do, but do not do according to their works; for they say, and do not do.

The instruction that the disciples should practice whatever the Pharisees tell them, but not what they do, is one of the most disputed verses in the Gospel of Matthew. Read in isolation it appears to commend adherence to the teaching of the scribes and Pharisees while denouncing only their failure to follow that teaching themselves, extending to the rest of Matthew the same reading would require Jesus to endorse Pharisaic positions on the Sabbath (12:1–14), handwashing (15:1–20), sacrifices (15:3–9), and divorce (19:3–9), all of which the Gospel elsewhere rejects.

Rabbinowitz draws on the works of several scholars who hold that Pharisaic halakhah, or rabbinic law, flourished in Judaism during the late Second Temple period, and was spread through the synagogue. As physical evidence he points to the spread of ritual baths (miqva'ot), the use of stone vessels to guard against ritual impurity, and the practice of reburying bones in ossuaries.

=== Verse 5 ===
But all their works they do to be seen by men. They make their phylacteries broad and enlarge the borders of their garments.

Arthur Carr notes that "Jesus does not prohibit the practice of wearing phylacteries, but the ostentatious enlargement of them". He also observes that "it is thought by many that our Saviour Himself wore phylacteries". Their use is prescribed in Exodus 13:9 and Deuteronomy 6:8.

=== Verses 6–7 ===
They love the best places at feasts, the best seats in the synagogues, greetings in the marketplaces, and to be called by men, 'Rabbi, Rabbi.'

Davies and Allison situate these verses within the ancient habit of charging opponents of seeking elevated public status, common in Jewish and Greco-Roman polemics. The desires listed in these passages, prime placement at meals, front seating in synagogues, and public greetings, all share the same logic: the need to have one's standing constantly confirmed by others. The two scholars point to a range of parallels, from the Roman practice of reserving front theatre seats for senators, recorded by Suetonius in his biography of Augustus, to Jewish communal practices attested in both archaeology and rabbinic sources, suggesting that this was a phenomenon that Matthew's audience would have immediately understood.

=== Verse 8 ===
But you, do not be called 'Rabbi'; for One is your Teacher, the Christ, and you are all brethren.

Davies and Allison read this prohibition as a response to the growing formalization of "rabbi" as an official designation in late first-century Judaism. Because in Christianity all genuine teaching authority belongs to the Messiah, any earthly authority is by nature secondary and should produce humility rather than the desire for honorific distinction. Within the community, Davies and Allison note, the proper relationship among members is one of equality, making title seeking out of place.

=== Verse 9 ===
Do not call anyone on earth your father; for One is your Father, He who is in heaven.

Davies and Allison consider several possible targets of this prohibition and settle on the view that it most plausibly addresses a practice of using "father" as an honorific for living religious authorities, whether Jewish or Christian. They rule out the reading that it concerns only dead teachers on the grounds that the surrounding context is preoccupied with humility among the living, not with commemoration.

=== Verses 11–12 ===
But he who is greatest among you shall be your servant. And whoever exalts himself will be humbled, and he who humbles himself will be exalted.

Davies and Allison note that the section's concluding maxim was already a pre-existing proverb in the ancient world, appearing in multiple traditions, but insist that its meaning in verses 11–12 is not merely proverbial but eschatological. The passive constructions point to final judgment, giving the prohibition against titles a significance that extends beyond social etiquette. The section therefore concludes by grounding the call to humility in the prospect of God's verdict.

== The scribes and Pharisees denounced (verses 13–36) ==
While the previous pericope was directed to the crowd and the disciples, this part addresses the scribes and Pharisees, in the form of 'seven woes', a powerful climax to repudiate their leadership.

=== Verse 13 ===
But woe to you, scribes and Pharisees, hypocrites! For you shut the kingdom of heaven in people's faces. For you neither enter yourselves nor allow those who would enter to go in.

Some manuscripts add here (or after verse 12) verse 14: Woe to you, scribes and Pharisees, hypocrites! For you devour widows' houses and for a pretense you make long prayers; therefore you will receive the greater condemnation.

The phrase "enter the kingdom of heaven" appears three other times in the Gospel, at Matthew 5:20, 7:21, and 18:3.

=== Verse 23 ===
Woe to you, scribes and Pharisees, hypocrites! For you pay tithe of mint and anise and cummin, and have neglected the weightier matters of the law: justice and mercy and faith. These you ought to have done, without leaving the others undone.

The "anise" mentioned in some translations is dill (A. graveolens), rather than anise. The Pharisees apparently grew it in order to pay some tithes.

=== Verse 25–26 ===
Woe to you, scribes and Pharisees, hypocrites! For you cleanse the outside of the cup and dish, but inside they are full of extortion and self-indulgence. Blind Pharisee, first cleanse the inside of the cup and dish, that the outside of them may be clean also.

The fifth woe contrasts the clean exterior of the cup and dish with their inward contents of extortion and self-indulgence. The earliest layer of the Mishnah, a collection of Jewish legal traditions compiled in the early third century from material spanning multiple earlier periods, preserves an active dispute between the Schools of Hillel and Shammai, two rival schools of thought, over whether the inside and outside of a vessel can affect each other's ritual status (Mishnah, Kelim 25.1.7–8). Thus, the author engages an existing first-century halakhic controversy rather than simply employing a metaphor.

=== Verse 27–28 ===
Woe to you, scribes and Pharisees, hypocrites! For you are like whitewashed tombs which indeed appear beautiful outwardly, but inside are full of dead men's bones and all uncleanness. Even so you also outwardly appear righteous to men, but inside you are full of hypocrisy and lawlessness.

The sixth woe draws on the contrast between the whitened exterior of tombs and the bones and impurity within. The Mishnah notes that tombs around Jerusalem were marked with whitewash before the pilgrimage festival of Passover, so that pilgrims would not unwittingly contract ritual impurity by walking over them.

=== Verse 29–36 ===
Woe to you, scribes and Pharisees, hypocrites! Because you build the tombs of the prophets and adorn the monuments of the righteous, and say, 'If we had lived in the days of our fathers, we would not have been partakers with them in the blood of the prophets.' Therefore you are witnesses against yourselves that you are sons of those who murdered the prophets. Fill up, then, the measure of your fathers' guilt. Serpents, brood of vipers! How can you escape the condemnation of hell? Therefore, indeed, I send you prophets, wise men, and scribes: some of them you will kill and crucify, and some of them you will scourge in your synagogues and persecute from city to city, that on you may come all the righteous blood shed on the earth, from the blood of righteous Abel to the blood of Zechariah, son of Berechiah, whom you murdered between the temple and the altar. Assuredly, I say to you, all these things will come upon this generation.

The seventh woe accuses the leaders of building tombs for the prophets while bearing the guilt of those who killed them. It ends in a prediction that all righteous blood shed on earth, from Abel to Zechariah son of Berachiah, will fall upon their generation. Abel is the first murder victim in the Hebrew Bible; the identity of Zechariah is disputed. Three candidates have been proposed: Zechariah son of Berachiah, one of the twelve minor prophets, as in the Book of Zechariah; Zechariah son of Jehoiada, the priest who denounced idolatry and was stoned in the temple court on the orders of the king (2 Chronicles 24); and Zechariah son of Baris, recorded by Josephus in The Jewish War (4.334–344), who was killed by Zealots during the First Jewish Revolt.

The scourging in the synagogues and persecutions mentioned in verse 34 reflect ordinary first-century synagogue discipline, of which Paul's report of having received thirty-nine lashes (2 Corinthians 11:24) is an example; flogging in the synagogue is also mentioned in Matthew 10:17.

"These things" in verse 36 renders ταῦτα πάντα (tauta panta) in both the Textus Receptus and critical Westcott-Hort text, but Meyer points out that the reversed reading, πάντα ταῦτα (panta tauta), is also "well attested".

== The fate of Jerusalem (verses 37–39) ==
This final section of this chapter acts as the inevitable conclusion on the hypocrisy of the leaders to the total guilt of Israel in its rejection of God's messenger: Jerusalem has rejected the call of God's last and greatest messenger and will receive judgment for it. Jesus departs from the city, anticipating both that he will return, and that calamities will befall it. Applying the term "Jerusalem" to the Jewish people, Methodist writer Joseph Benson suggests that Jesus "would have taken the whole body of them, if they would have consented to be so taken, into his church, and have gathered them all".

=== Verse 39 ===
For I say to you, you shall see Me no more till you say, 'Blessed is He who comes in the name of the Lord!'

Citing Psalm 118:26, and echoing Matthew 21:19, Let no fruit grow on you ever again, these words are addressed to "the Jews in general, [the] men of Jerusalem in particular".

== Historicity and interpretation ==
The question whether the polemics presented in Chapter 23 derive from the historical Jesus has been raised by several scholars. Recent scholarship tends to find more historical value in the controversy narratives between Jesus and the Pharisees than 20th century scholarship. In his work Jesus and Judaism, biblical scholar E. P. Sanders argued that "the Jesus of Matthew 23:5–7 and 23:23–26 is not the historical Jesus" but reflects Matthean church material. On Sanders's account, while someone "accused the Pharisees of hypocrisy and legalism", the wording and themes of this material tie it closely to passages such as Matthew 6:2, 5, 16 and 5:46–47, which call Jesus's followers to outdo both hypocrites and tax collectors; Sanders locates the resulting Sitz im Leben in "at least one section" of the church that "urged the disciples of Christ to obey the letter of the law in all particulars" while still distinguishing itself from Pharisaic tradition. Sanders also argued that the standard Christian portrait of Pharisaic legalism functions as theology dressed up as history. Once the gospel is defined as "renouncing achievement", and Jesus is supposed to have preached that gospel, the historical conclusion that he must have attacked legalism follows from the dogma rather than from the texts.

Historian Joseph Klausner, in his work Jesus of Nazareth, regarded Matthew 23 as authentic. He considered its accusations only partly justified and applicable to only some Pharisees. Nevertheless, he identified one Pharisaic tendency that, in his view, merited criticism: the inclination to assign nearly equal weight to commandments governing relations between human beings and God and those governing relations between people. According to Sanders, Klausner's interpretation reflected the intellectual climate of his own time, in which many scholars held that ethical obligations between people should take precedence over ritual and ceremonial observance.

Scholar of early Judaism and Christianity Anthony J. Saldarini argued that Matthew 23 is sectarian polemic promoting Matthew's own Christ-following Jewish community against contending Jewish leaders. Matthew's goal, in this reading, is to delegitimize those leaders in order to establish his group as "the true leaders of Israel, accurate interpreters of scripture, and authentic messengers of God's will". The location of Matthew's community remains uncertain; one leading proposal, defended by scholars such as John P. Meier, places it in Antioch, though a town in Galilee or neighboring regions is also plausible. The community was active in the aftermath of the destruction of Jerusalem in 70 CE, which left a leadership vacuum among the Jewish population of Judaea. Into this vacuum moved a coalition of Pharisees, priests, and other groups, working to reconstitute Judaism for a reality no longer centered on the Temple; the resulting rabbinic coalition would become the dominant form of Judaism in the centuries that followed. Matthew's community, in Saldarini's reading, constituted a "rival reform movement" competing for influence within this landscape, but ultimately failed: "increasingly being perceived as deviant" by other Jews, it found its Jesus-centered form of Judaism rejected by the broader Jewish community.

According to William David Davies and Dale C. Allison, "[Matthew's] community thought of itself as competing with the heirs of Pharisaism, who thus became polemical objects."

New Testament scholar Luke Timothy Johnson argued that Matthew 23 should be understood as a rhetorical exercise. In his reading, it follows a well-established topos (a standardized treatment of a subject) in Hellenistic philosophical polemic, where rivals were often accused of preaching without practicing, loving honor and wealth, and being outwardly virtuous but inwardly corrupt, the same charges Dio Chrysostom, Aelius Aristides, and Epictetus hurled at competing schools. Johnson contended that the passage functions as a protreptic text (an exhortation urging a way of life), directing its rhetoric inward; the Pharisees serve as a negative foil to instruct Matthew's community's own disciples in how not to behave, rather than to describe Jewish leaders literally.

== See also ==
- Jerusalem
- Pharisees
- Tefillin
- Tzitzit
- Related Bible parts: Exodus 13, Numbers 15, Deuteronomy 6, Deuteronomy 11, Deuteronomy 22, Mark 12, Luke 11, Luke 13, Luke 20.
