= Luke 12 =

- ← chapter 11 chapter 13 →
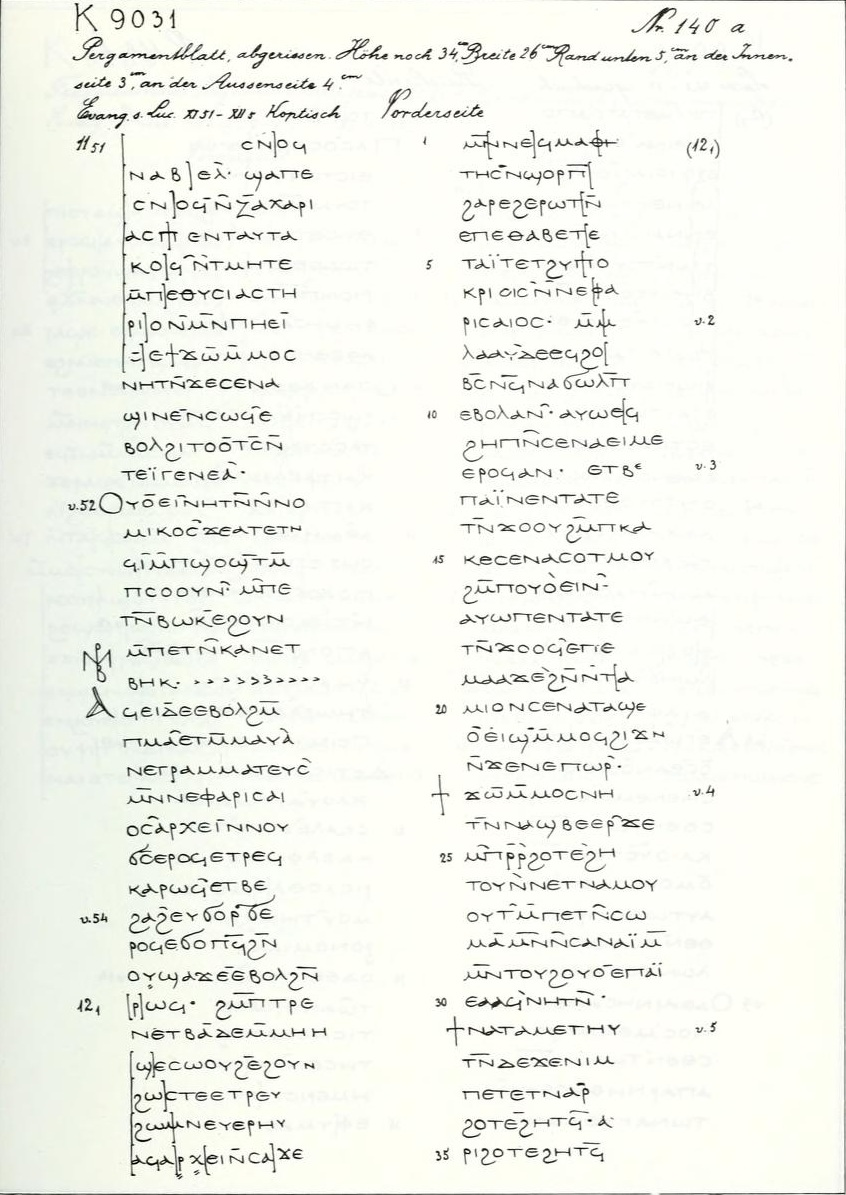
- Fragment of Uncial 0191, 6th century bilingual Greek-Coptic manuscript of the Gospels with text of Luke 11:51–12:5
- Book: Gospel of Luke
- Category: Gospel
- Christian Bible part: New Testament
- Order in the Christian part: 3

Luke 12 is the 12th chapter of the Gospel of Luke in the New Testament of the Christian Bible. It records a number of teachings and parables told by Jesus Christ when "an innumerable multitude of people had gathered together", but addressed "first of all" to his disciples. Early Christian tradition uniformly affirmed that Luke the Evangelist composed this Gospel as well as the Acts of the Apostles. Critical opinion on the tradition was evenly divided at the end of the 20th century.

== Text ==
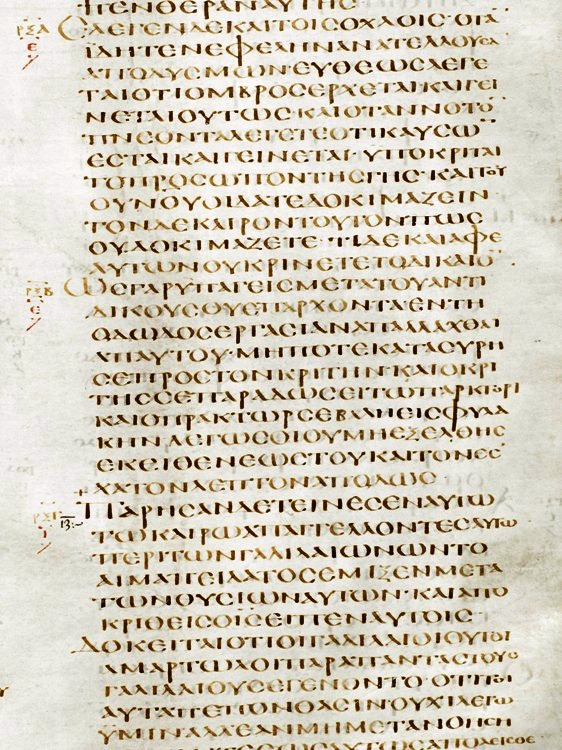
Codex Alexandrinus (c. AD 400–440), Luke 12:54–13:4

The original text was written in Koine Greek. Some early manuscripts containing the text of this chapter are:

- Papyrus 75 (AD 175–225)
- Papyrus 45 (~250)
- Codex Vaticanus (325–350)
- Codex Sinaiticus (330–360)
- Codex Bezae (~400)
- Codex Washingtonianus (~400)
- Codex Alexandrinus (400–440)
- Codex Ephraemi Rescriptus (~450; extant verses 1–3)

This chapter is divided into 59 verses.

== Hypocrisy and the fear of God ==
Scottish minister William Robertson Nicoll calls this passage (verses 1–12) an "exhortation to fearless utterance". Henry Alford suggests that this discourse consists "for the most part of sayings repeated from other occasions".

=== An innumerable multitude ===
In the meantime, when an innumerable multitude of people had gathered together so that they trampled one another, He began to say to His disciples first of all, "Beware of the leaven of the Pharisees, which is hypocrisy".

Nicoll suggests that this is "the largest crowd mentioned anywhere in the Gospels" but Jesus speaks "first of all" to his disciples, only turning to the multitude in verses 14–21, in response to a question from someone in the crowd, and again in verses 54–59. Peter asks (at verse 41) whether the parable of the faithful servant is addressed solely to the disciples or to the wider multitude (παντας, pantas: 'everyone').

The Jerusalem Bible notes that an alternative reading would connect the word "first" with the succeeding statement: First of all, be on your guard ... (Greek: πρωτον προσεχετε εαυτοις, proton prosechete eautois). Protestant commentator Heinrich Meyer likewise argues that "πρῶτον, before all, is to be taken with προσέχετε"; it does not belong to what precedes". The Matthew Bible (1537) and Ruth Magnusson Davis' New Matthew Bible translation (2016) pick up this reading:

... he began and said to his disciples, "First of all, beware of the leaven of the Pharisees, which is hypocrisy".

=== Verse 2 ===
For there is nothing covered that will not be revealed, nor hidden that will not be known.

This verse matches Luke 8:17:

For nothing is secret that will not be revealed, nor anything hidden that will not be known and come to light.

Eric Franklin suggests that, in particular, it is Pharisaic hypocrisy which will be revealed, while David Robert Palmer translates the initial words of this verse, οὐδὲν δέ, ouden de, as "But there is nothing ...", arguing that "the particle δέ is meant to make a contrast here, between hypocrisy, in verse 1, and the disclosure of verse 2".

=== Verse 3 ===
Therefore whatever you have spoken in the dark will be heard in the light, and what you have spoken in the ear in inner rooms will be proclaimed on the housetops.

In Matthew's wording, Jesus speaks in the darkness and exhorts his disciples subsequently to reveal what he has said (Matthew 10:27). Luke's version has the disciples speaking in the darkness. Nicoll compares these versions:

In the one representation the whispering stage has its place in the history of the kingdom; in the latter it is conceived as illegitimate and futile. What you whisper will become known to all, therefore whisper not but speak from the housetop.

== Parable of the Rich Fool ==
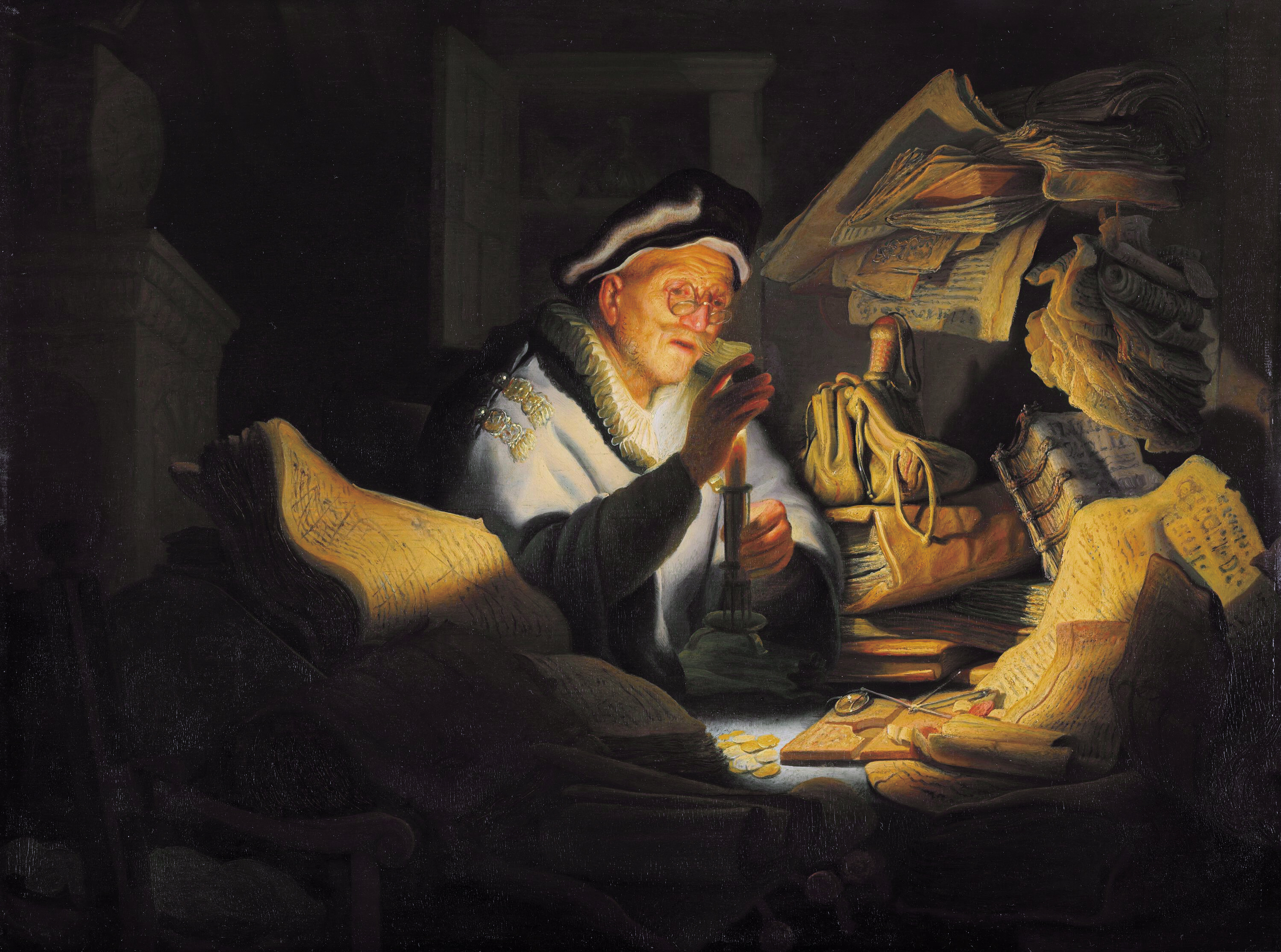
The Parable of the Rich Fool by Rembrandt, 1627

Among the canonical gospels of the New Testament, this parable of Jesus appears only in Luke's Gospel. The parable reflects the foolishness of attaching too much importance to wealth. It is introduced by a member of the crowd listening to Jesus, who tries to enlist Jesus' help in a family financial dispute:

One of the multitude said to him, "Teacher, tell my brother to divide the inheritance with me.

J. B. Lightfoot, Kuinoel, and others note and emphasise that he was "certainly no attendant of Jesus". Meyer observes that he was "a Jew on whom the endowments and authority of Jesus produced such an impression that he thought he might be able to make use of Him in the matter of his inheritance", but considers that "whether he was a younger brother who grudged to the first-born his double share of the inheritance... must be left in doubt".

An abbreviated version of the parable appears in the non-canonical Gospel of Thomas (Saying 63) with a longer version similar to Luke's in Papyrus Oxyrhynchus 5575.

The parable has been depicted by artists such as Rembrandt (illustrated), Jan Luyken, James Tissot, and David Teniers the Younger.

== Do not worry ==
=== Verse 29 ===
And seek not ye what ye shall eat, or what ye shall drink, neither be ye of doubtful mind.

== Seek the kingdom of God ==
=== Verse 31 ===
But rather seek ye the kingdom of God; and all these things shall be added unto you.

Similarly in Matthew 6:33, with a slightly longer text: Seek ye first the kingdom of God, and his righteousness; and all these things shall be added unto you.

=== Verse 33 ===
Sell your possessions, and give to the needy. Provide yourselves with moneybags that do not grow old, with a treasure in the heavens that does not fail, where no thief approaches and no moth destroys.

This is one of several occasions in Luke's gospel where Jesus encourages almsgiving.

=== Verse 34 ===
For where your treasure is, there will your heart be also.

== Parable of the faithful servant ==
A series of exhortations to watchfulness and Luke's version of the parable of the faithful servant are contained in verses 35–48. The "master" (ὁ κύριος) is portrayed as being "away at a wedding", but "the main thought here only is that he is away at a feast, and will return".

== I came to bring fire to the earth ==
=== Verse 49 ===
"I came to bring fire to the earth, and how I wish it were already kindled!"

F. W. Farrar, in the Cambridge Bible for Schools and Colleges, makes reference to an ‘unwritten saying’ of Christ, He who is near me is near the fire, which is recorded by Ignatius, Origen and Didymus.

== Make peace with your adversary ==
The final verses of the chapter (verses 57–59) make use of an illustration based on a pecuniary claim heard before the magistrates' bench (Greek: ἄρχοντα, archonta, a Lukan word also appearing four times in the Acts of the Apostles):

=== Verse 57 ===
Even of yourselves, do you not judge what is right?

== See also ==
- Sermon on the Mount
- Sermon on the Plain
- Ministry of Jesus
- Parables of Jesus
- Related Bible parts: Matthew 5, 6, 10, 24

Preceded by Luke 11	Chapters of the Bible; Gospel of Luke	Succeeded by Luke 13
