= Papyrus 103 =

- New Testament manuscript
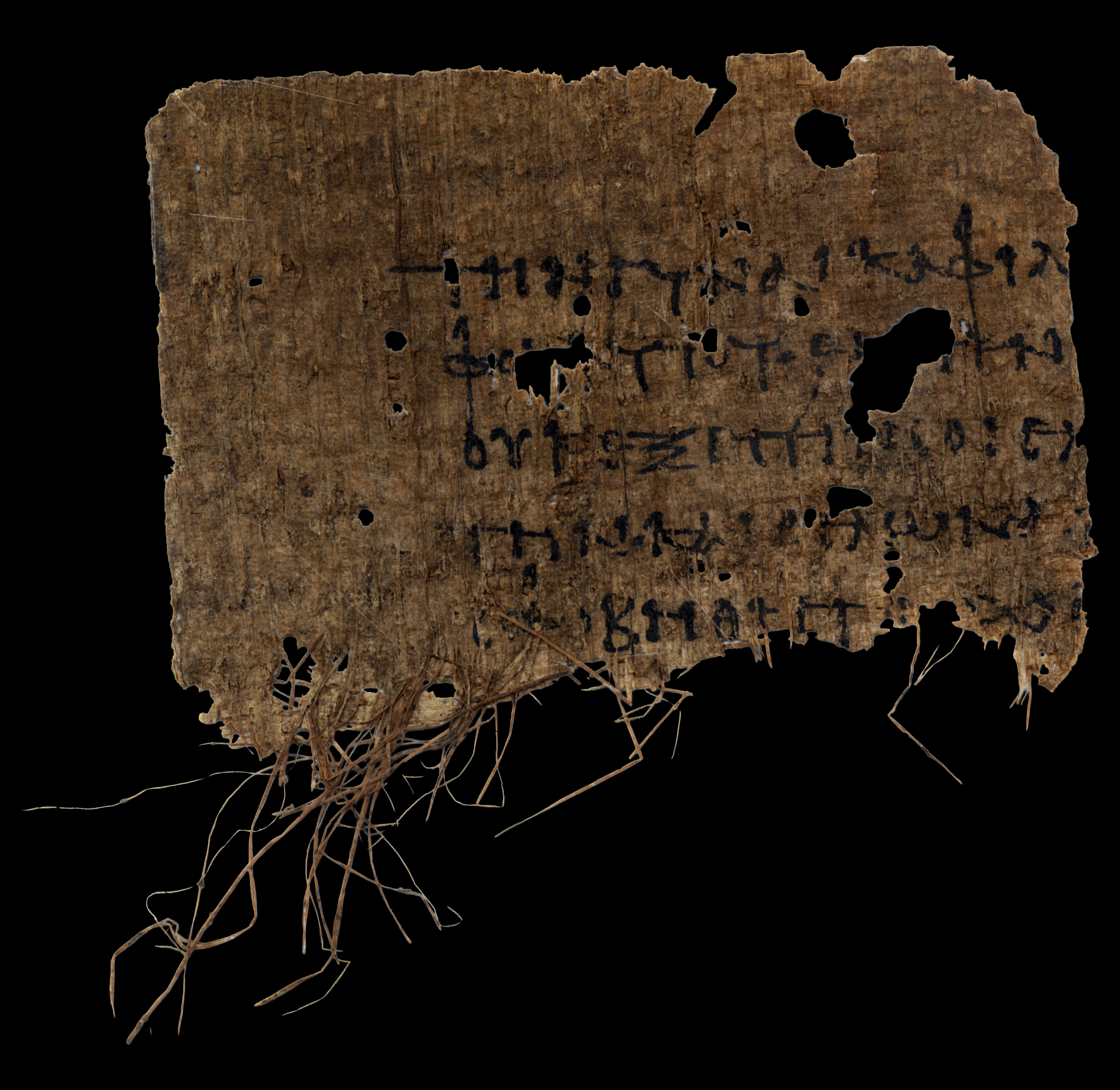
- Recto, Matthew 13:55-56
- Name: P. Oxy. 4403
- Sign: 𝔓^{103}
- Text: Gospel of Matthew 13:55-56; 14:3-5
- Date: c. 150-235
- Script: Greek
- Found: Oxyrhynchus, Egypt
- Now at: Sackler Library
- Cite: J. D. Thomas, OP LXIV (1997), pp. 5-7
- Size: [16] x [11] cm
- Type: Alexandrian text-type
- Category: I

Papyrus 103 (in the Gregory-Aland numbering), designated by 𝔓^{103}, is a copy of part of the New Testament in Greek. It is a papyrus manuscript of the Gospel of Matthew.

== Description ==
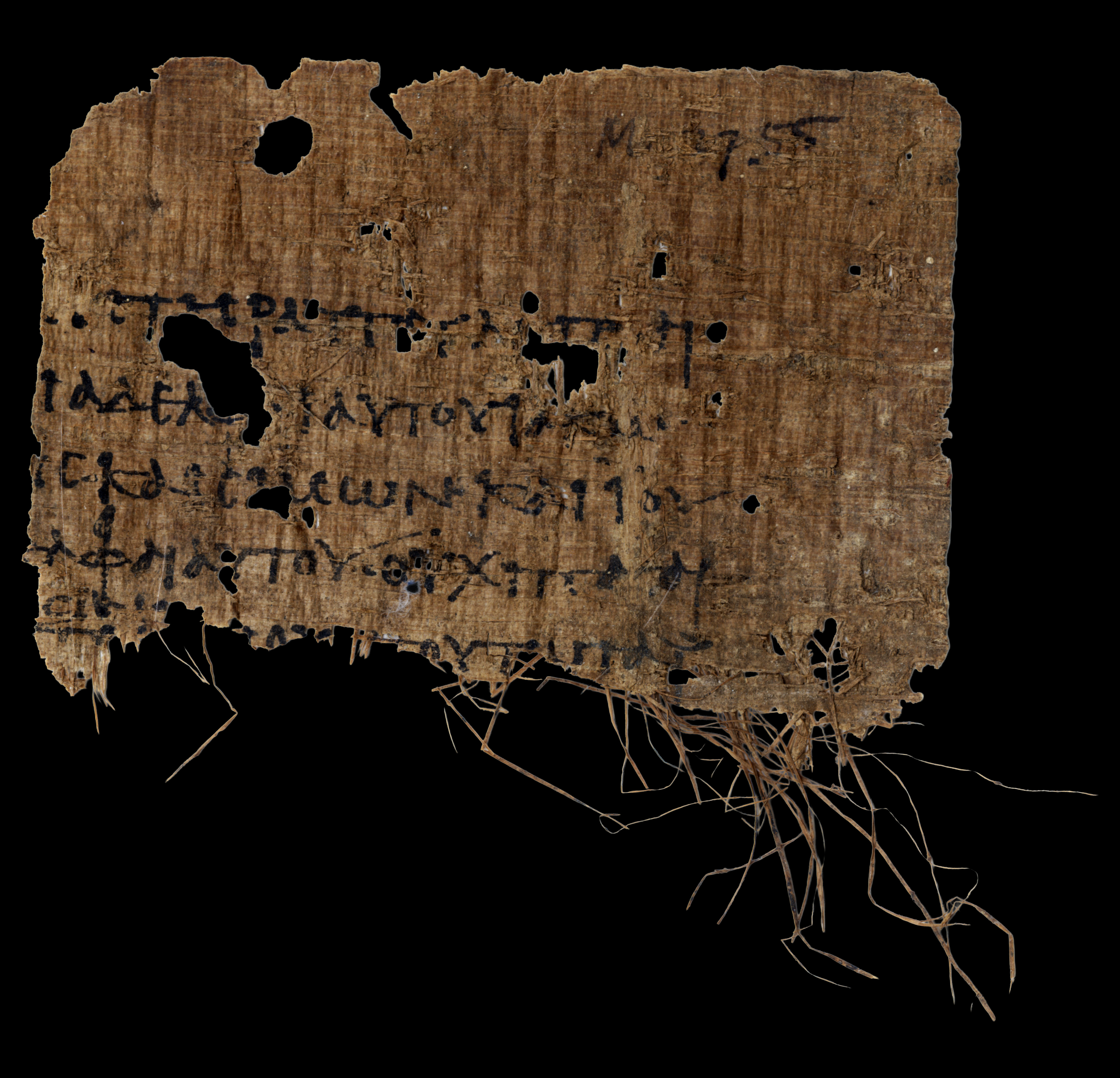
Verso, Matthew 14:3-5

The surviving texts of Matthew are verses 13:55-56 and 14:3-5: they are in a fragmentary condition. The manuscript has been assigned palaeographically to the late 2nd or early 3rd century.

Probably together with Papyrus 77 it belonged to the same codex.

Text

The Greek text of the codex is a representative of the Alexandrian text-type. According to Comfort it is proto-Alexandrian text.

In Matthew 13:55, the name of Jesus' second brother reads [...]ης so that either Ἰωάννης (John) and Ἰωσῆς (Joses) are possible original readings.

Ἰωάννης (John) א* D M U Γ 2 28 579 1424 Byz^{mss} vg^{mss} Origen^{pt}
Ἰωσῆς (Joses) K L W Δ Π 0106 f^{13} 22 565 1241 1582^{mg} Byz^{mss} it^{k,q^{c}} co^{sa,bo^{mss}} Basil of Caesarea
Ἰωσῆ (Joses) 118 157 700* 1071 syr^{h} co^{bo^{mss}}
Ἰωσὴφ (Joseph) א^{2} B C N Θ f^{1} 33 700^{c} 892 lat syr^{s,c,h^{mg}} mae-1 Codex Schøyen co^{bo^{mss}} Origen^{pt}

Location

The manuscript is currently housed at the Sackler Library (Papyrology Rooms, P. Oxy. 4403) in Oxford.

== See also ==
- List of New Testament papyri
- Oxyrhynchus Papyri
