= Papyrus 77 =

Papyrus 𝔓^{77}
- New Testament manuscript
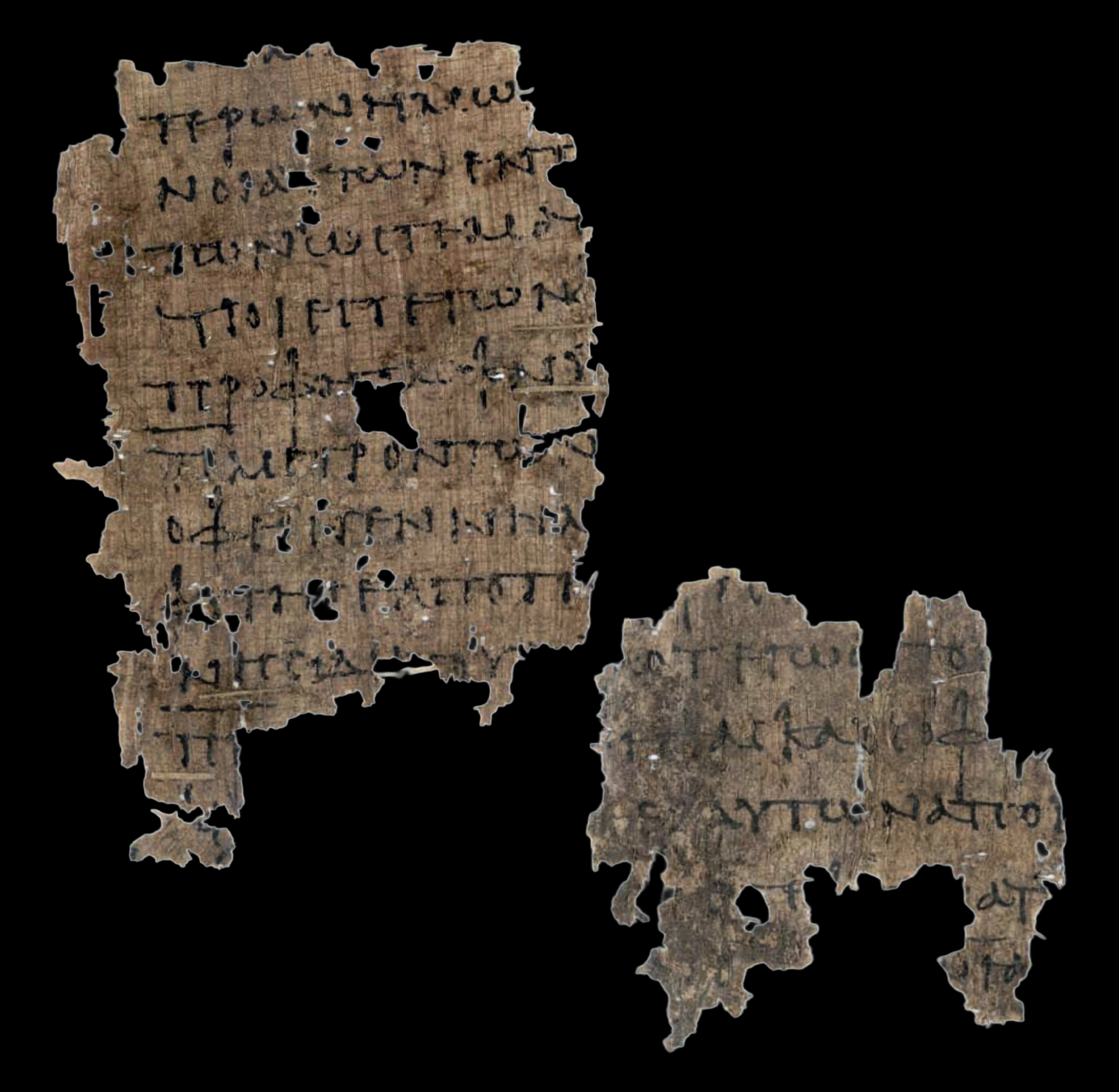
- Recto, Matt 22:30-34
- Name: P. Oxy. 2683 and 4405
- Text: Matthew 23 †
- Date: c. 150-225
- Script: Greek
- Found: Egypt
- Now at: Bodleian Art, Archaeology and Ancient World Library
- Cite: L. Ingrams, P. Kingston, P. Parsons, and J. Rea, OP XXXIV (1968), pp. 4-6.
- Size: 4.6 cm x 7 cm
- Type: Alexandrian text-type
- Category: I

Papyrus 77 (in the Gregory-Aland numbering), designated by 𝔓^{77}, is a papyrus manuscript of the Gospel of Matthew verses 23:30-39. It is written in Greek and has palaeographically been assigned a date anywhere from the middle 2nd century to the early 3rd century.

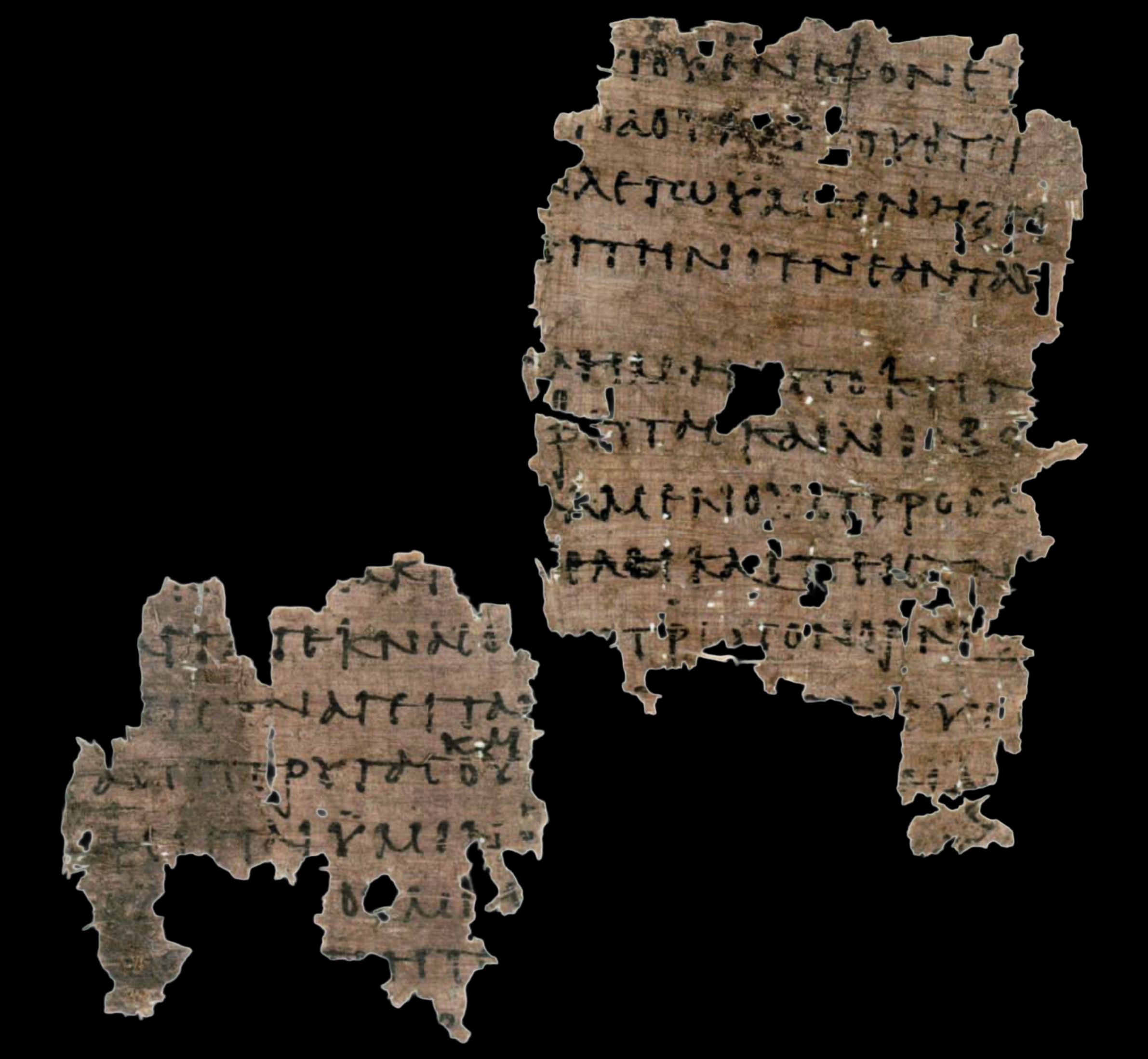
Verso, Matthew 22:35-39

According to Comfort, Papyrus 77 together with Papyrus 103 probably belong to the same codex.

The Greek text of this codex is a representative of the Alexandrian text-type. Aland ascribed it as an “at least normal text”, and placed it in Category I. 𝔓^{77} has the closest affinity with Codex Sinaiticus.

It is currently housed at the Bodleian Art, Archaeology and Ancient World Library (P. Oxy. 2683) in Oxford.

== Textual Variants ==
- 23:30: Rearranges the words αυτων κοινωνοι (their partners) to κοινωνοι αυτων ('partners of them').
- 23:37: Has variant spelling ορνιξ for ορνις (hen).
- 23:37: Originally omitted και from the text. Scribe added it later superlinearly between πτερυγας and ουκ.
- 23:38: According to the transcription from the University of Münster Institute for New Testament Textual Research, the scribe omitted ερημος (desolate). According to the transcription of Philip Comfort and David Barrett however, the scribe included it.

== See also ==
- List of New Testament papyri
- Matthew 23

== Images ==
- P.Oxy.LXVI 2683 from Papyrology at Oxford's "POxy: Oxyrhynchus Online"
- Papyrus 77 recto
- Papyrus 77 verso
