= Bowyer Bible =

Robert Bowyer's forty-five volume edition of the Macklin Bible

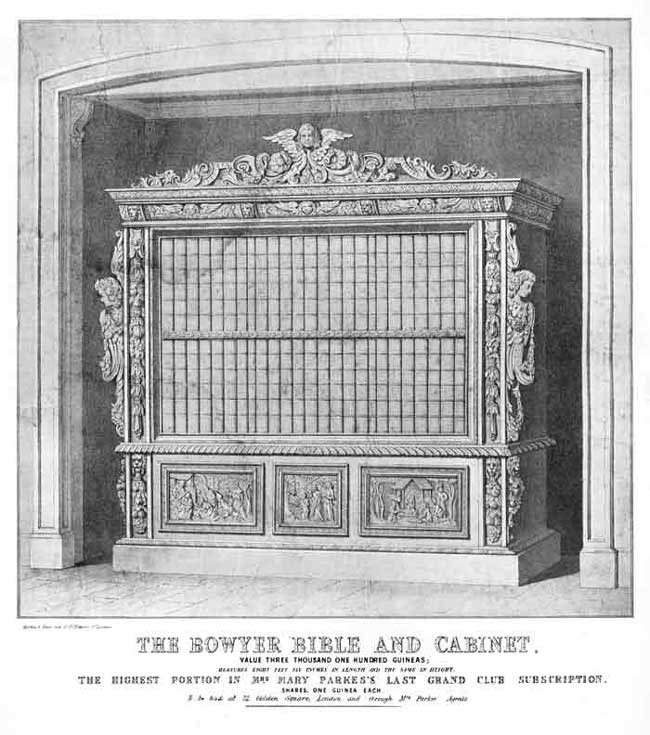
The "Bowyer Bible"

The Bowyer Bible is an extra-illustrated 45-volume edition of the Macklin Bible created by Robert Bowyer between 1800 and 1834. Only a single copy of the Bowyer Bible exists. Robert Bowyer created this Bible by disassembling his own copy of the Macklin Bible and adding additional prints and drawings to it before having it rebound. Bowyer also had a bookcase designed and made special to house the 45 volumes of his Macklin Bible.

The Bible and its bookcase is owned by the Bolton Council and is in the collection of Bolton Museum in England.

== Background and description ==
As did other owners of the Macklin Bible, Bowyer disassembled his copy and inserted additional illustrations and prints before having the Bible rebound. The Bowyer Bible is the most famous Bible resulting from this process.

Bowyer worked on his Bible for upwards of 30 years, adding more than 6,000 additional different prints and around 200 of the original drawings and vignettes completed by Philip James de Loutherbourg created for the Macklin Bible. Among the over 6,000 prints are works of other master artists including Rembrandt, Rubens, Titian, Albert Durer, Raffaelle, Marc Antonio and Callot.

According to a mid-October 1840, London newspaper posting labelled CURIOUS BIBLE, Bowyer's version of the Macklin Bible was insured at the Albion Insurance Office for £3000, and contained representation of nearly every fact, circumstance, and object mention in the Holy Scriptures, including illustrations of plants and living creatures included as proof of the universal deluge.

== Provenance and restoration ==
After Robert Bowyer's death in 1834, the collector John Albinson of Bolton purchased Bowyer's Bible. In 1853 or 1854, the Mayor of Bolton, Robert Heywood, purchased the Bible from Albinson's estate for £550. After Heywood's death in 1868, the Bible passed to his descendants. In 1917, Heywood's descendants loaned the Bible to Bolton Libraries. In 1948, the Bible was donated to the people of Bolton.

In 2002, Bolton librarian Ken Bell pushed to make the Bible accessible to the public. In furtherance of this goal, archivist Sam Collenette obtained from the Heritage Lottery Fund and The Pilgrim Trust the £31,000 needed to restore the bible. The Heritage Lottery Fund granted £26,000 towards the project. Restoration was completed by Greater Manchester County Records Office's Nic Rayner who completed the task within eight months.
