= Eternal Father, Strong to Save =

British hymn associated with seafarers

- Service hymn of the Royal Navy
- Also known as: "Melita" (music)
- Lyrics: William Whiting, 1860
- Music: John Bacchus Dykes, 1861

Audio sample
- Sung by the US Navy Band's "Sea Chanters" ensemble: file; help

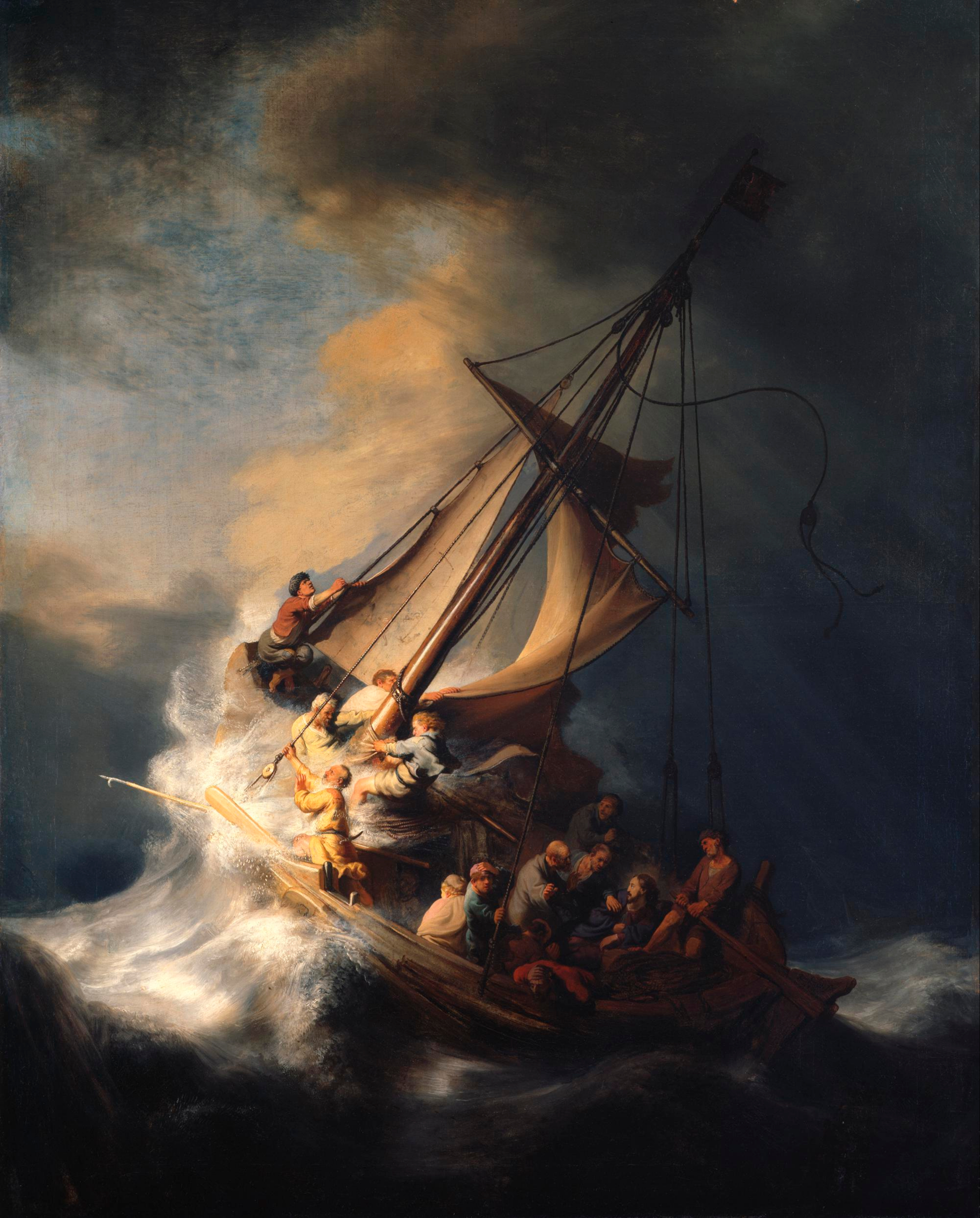
The Storm on the Sea of Galilee by Rembrandt van Rijn

"Melita"
Instrumental performance by the United States Marine Band in 1992.

"Eternal Father, Strong to Save" is a British hymn traditionally associated with seafarers, particularly in the maritime armed services. Written in 1860, its author, William Whiting, was inspired by the dangers of the sea described in Psalm 107. It was popularised by the Royal Navy and the United States Navy in the late 19th century, and variations of it were soon adopted by many branches of the armed services in the United Kingdom, the United States and Australia. Services who have adapted the hymn include the Royal Marines, Royal Air Force, the British Army, the Royal Australian Navy, the United States Coast Guard, United States Marine Corps and the United States Space Force, as well as the navies of many other Commonwealth realms. Accordingly, it is known by many names, variously referred to as the Hymn of His Majesty's Armed Forces, the Royal Navy Hymn, the United States Navy Hymn (or simply The Navy Hymn), and sometimes by the last line of its first verse, "For Those in Peril on the Sea". The hymn has a long tradition in civilian maritime contexts as well, being regularly invoked by ship's chaplains and sung during services on ocean crossings.

== Origin ==
The original hymn was written in 1860 by William Whiting, an Anglican churchman from Winchester, United Kingdom. Whiting grew up near the ocean on the coasts of England and at the age of thirty-five had felt his life spared by God when a violent storm nearly claimed the ship he was travelling on, instilling a belief in God's command over the rage and calm of the sea. As headmaster of the Winchester College Choristers' School some years later, he was approached by a student about to travel to the United States, who confided in Whiting an overwhelming fear of the ocean voyage. Whiting shared his experiences of the ocean and wrote the hymn to "anchor his faith". In writing it, Whiting is generally thought to have been inspired by Psalm 107, which describes the power and fury of the seas in great detail:

23 They that go down to the sea in ships,
that do business in great waters;
24 These see the works of the Lord,
and his wonders in the deep.
25 For he commandeth, and raiseth the stormy wind,
which lifteth up the waves thereof.
26 They mount up to the heaven, they go down again to the depths:
their soul is melted because of trouble.
27 They reel to and fro, and stagger like a drunken man, and are at their wits' end.
28 Then they cry unto the Lord in their trouble,
and he bringeth them out of their distresses.
29 He maketh the storm a calm, so that the waves thereof are still.
30 Then are they glad because they be quiet;
so he bringeth them unto their desired haven.
31 Oh that men would praise the Lord for his goodness,
and for his wonderful works to the children of men!

Psalm 107: 23–31

Within a year the text appeared in the influential first edition of Hymns Ancient and Modern (HA&M) in 1861 (the setting is reproduced below) and its circulation became widespread throughout England. The text was substantially revised by the compilers of that edition. In response Whiting continued to revise his own text, releasing another version in 1869 and a third in 1874, the last one incorporating most of the suggested changes by HA&M.

Meanwhile, John B. Dykes, an Anglican clergyman, composed the tune "Melita", in 88 88 88 iambic meter, to accompany the HA&M version of 1861. Dykes was a well-known composer of nearly three hundred hymn tunes, many of which are still in use today. "Melita" is an archaic term for Malta, an ancient seafaring nation which was then a colony of the British Empire, and is now a member of the Commonwealth of Nations. It was the site of a shipwreck, mentioned in Acts of the Apostles (chapters 27–28), involving the Apostle Paul.

The original words of the 1861 version are:

Eternal Father, strong to save,
Whose arm hath bound the restless wave,
Who bid'st the mighty ocean deep
Its own appointed limits keep;
O hear us when we cry to Thee,
For those in peril on the sea.

O Christ, Whose voice the waters heard
And hushed their raging at Thy word,
Who walkedst on the foaming deep,
And calm amidst its rage didst sleep;
O hear us when we cry to Thee,
For those in peril on the sea.

Most Holy Spirit, Who didst brood
Upon the chaos dark and rude,
And bid its angry tumult cease,
And give, for wild confusion, peace;
O hear us when we cry to Thee,
For those in peril on the sea!

O Trinity of love and power,
Our brethren shield in danger's hour;
From rock and tempest, fire and foe,
Protect them wheresoe'er they go;
Thus evermore shall rise to Thee
Glad hymns of praise from land and sea.

Amen.

The first verse refers to God the Father fixing limits for the sea as described in Job 38:8-11 and Psalm 104:6-9. The second verse refers to Jesus' miracles of calming the storm in Matthew 8:23-27, Mark 4:35:41, and Luke 8:22-25 and walking on the waters of the Sea of Galilee in Mark 6:45-53, Matthew 14:22-34, and John 6:15-21. The third verse references the Holy Spirit's moving over the face of the waters in the Book of Genesis 1:2, while the final verse petitions the Holy Trinity to protect all people wherever they go.

== Navy use ==
Burial at sea aboard USS Ronald Reagan (30 September 2024) (14:14)
"Eternal Father, Strong to Save" performed at a burial at sea for a naval officer aboard USS Ronald Reagan in September 2024

The adoption of the hymn for devotional use and benedictions in the armed services was first recorded in 1879. In that year, Lieutenant Commander Charles Jackson Train was a navigation instructor at the United States Naval Academy at Annapolis and the master of the Midshipman Choir. Train began the practice of concluding Divine Services with the 1861 version of the hymn every Sunday, whereby it eventually became an academy, and then a service-wide tradition, becoming known as the Navy Hymn. The lyrics were altered to suit changes in the culture and technology of the navy. Additional variants have been written, often to specifically represent a particular branch of naval service.

Adoption of the hymn by the Royal Navy may have occurred earlier than its use in the United States. Although no clear records exist for its first use, the hymn was in widespread use by the 1890s in the Royal Navy. An extra verse was added during World War I to reflect the introduction of the Royal Naval Air Service. The result today is a hymn somewhat different from its American counterpart, with the optional verse for specific service branches being sung between the second and third verses.

== Multiservice rewording ==
In 1940, the US Episcopal Church altered three verses of the hymn to include travel on the land in the second verse (referencing Psalm 50) and in the air in the third verse (again referencing Genesis). This was published as Hymn No. 513 while the original lyrics were also published as Hymn No. 512 in The Hymnal 1940. The Hymnal 1982, which is in current use by most Episcopal congregations in the US, has further revised this version (as Hymn #579) with opening line "Almighty Father, strong to save..." by adding the word "space" to the final verse, so it ends "Glad praise from space, air, land, and sea", acknowledging the possibility of space travel. The Hymnal also has a more traditional water-only version (as Hymn #608) with opening line "Eternal Father, strong to save..." The 1940 version—incorporating sea, land, and air is:

Almighty Father, strong to save,
Whose arm hath bound the restless wave,
Who bidd'st the mighty ocean deep
Its own appointed limits keep:
O hear us when we cry to thee
For those in peril on the sea.

O Christ, the Lord of hill and plain
O'er which our traffic runs amain
By mountain pass or valley low;
Wherever, Lord, thy brethren go,
Protect them by thy guarding hand
From every peril on the land.

O Spirit, whom the Father sent
To spread abroad the firmament;
O Wind of heaven, by thy might
Save all who dare the eagle's flight,
And keep them by thy watchful care
From every peril in the air.

O Trinity of love and power,
Our brethren shield in danger's hour;
From rock and tempest, fire and foe,
Protect them wheresoe'er they go,
Thus evermore shall rise to thee
Glad praise from air and land and sea.

== Other variants ==
Several additional or variant verses are in use in the US military services, including the US Marines, US Navy Seabees, submariners and US Coast Guard.

== Notable uses ==
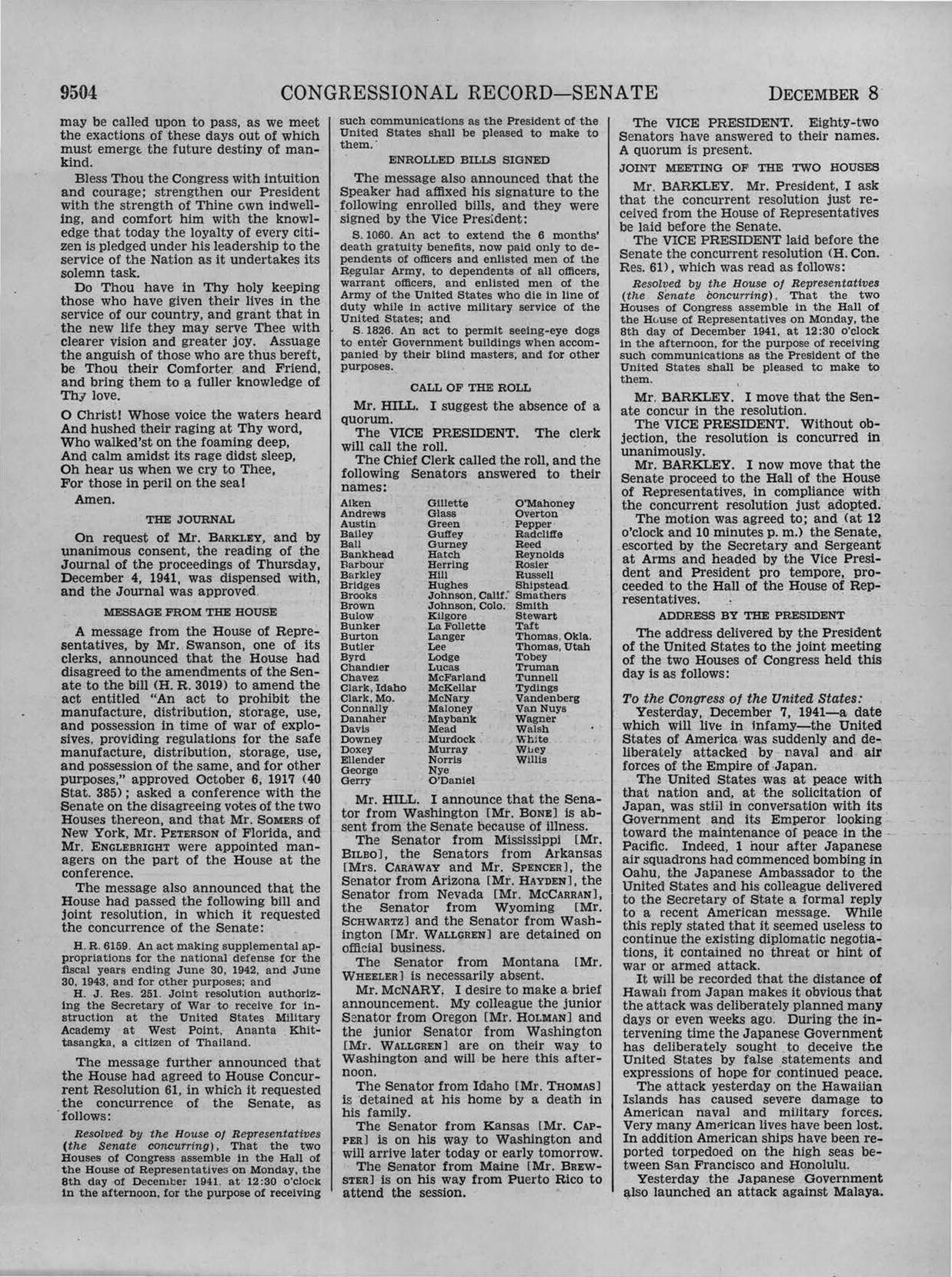
Proceedings of the United States Senate on December 8, 1941, the day after the attack on Pearl Harbor. Eternal Father, Strong to Save is sung in prayer.

- The hymn appears in many hymnals, including the Army and Navy Hymnal (1921), which was used by American forces during World War II, and The New English Hymnal (1986). The tune is also sometimes used for the text "Lord God of Hosts, within whose hand", written by Laurence Housman for the 1906 English Hymnal.
- It was among the songs sung on 9 August 1941 at a church service aboard the Royal Navy battleship HMS Prince of Wales attended by Winston Churchill (who requested it be sung) and Franklin D. Roosevelt at the conference creating the Atlantic Charter.
- It was spoken in the Congressional Record the day after the attack on Pearl Harbor.
- It features as the climax of Benjamin Britten's staged cantata for church performance, Noye's Fludde (1958). At the height of the storm, accompanied by the same ostinato in the bass that has built up to this point, the cast sings the first verse in unison (Noye an octave lower). They are joined by the audience/congregation in the second verse. The third verse is accompanied by an organ instead of the orchestra, the boys of the cast singing a descant while everyone else sings in unison.
- Owing to its nautical theme, this hymn has been played or sung at a number of funerals for those who have served in or been associated with the Royal Navy or US Navy. Most notably, it was sung at the funerals of the Earl Mountbatten of Burma (1979), Prince Philip, Duke of Edinburgh (2021), and of multiple US presidents, including Roosevelt, John F. Kennedy (1963), Richard Nixon (1994), George H. W. Bush (2018), and Jimmy Carter (2025).
- The hymn features in the 1995 film, Crimson Tide, adapted by composer Hans Zimmer.
- In the 1997 film Titanic the hymn is sung in the last service in the First Class Dining Saloon, just hours before the RMS Titanic sank. However, there is no indication that it was sung at that service in real life, with some passengers later noting they had been struck by its absence. It was sung later that day by second-class passengers in a musical prayer service.
