= Mark 3 =

- ← chapter 2 chapter 4 →
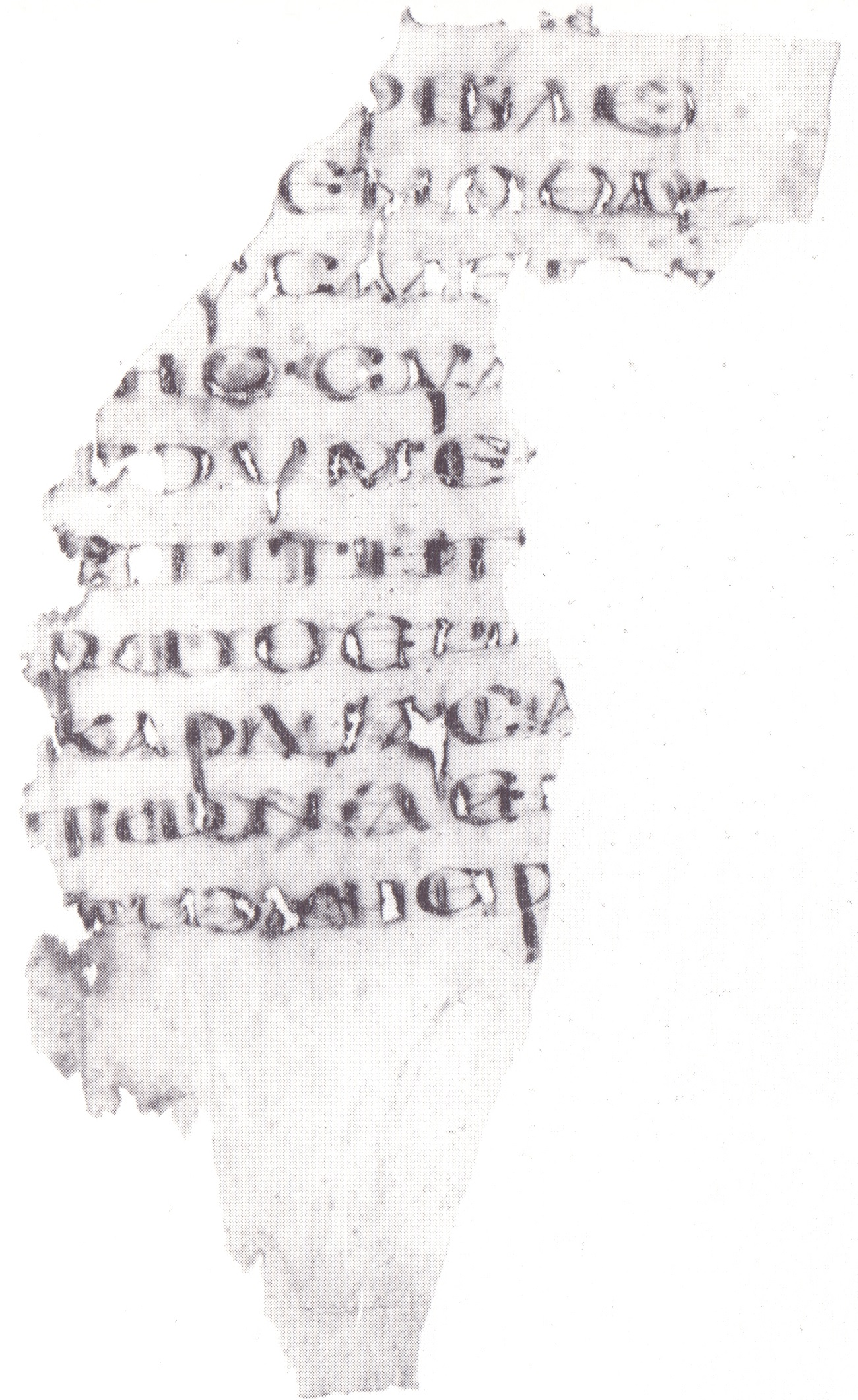
- Mark 3:2–3 from Uncial 0213 (5th/6th century)
- Book: Gospel of Mark
- Category: Gospel
- Christian Bible part: New Testament
- Order in the Christian part: 2

Mark 3 is the third chapter of the Gospel of Mark in the New Testament of the Christian Bible. It relates a conflict over healing on the Sabbath, the commissioning of the Twelve Apostles, a conflict with the Jerusalem scribes and a meeting of Jesus with his own family.

== Text ==
The original text was written in Koine Greek. This chapter is divided into 35 verses.

=== Textual witnesses ===
Some early manuscripts containing the text of this chapter are:

- Codex Vaticanus (325–350; complete)
- Codex Sinaiticus (330–360; complete)
- Codex Bezae (~400; complete)
- Codex Alexandrinus (400–440; complete)
- Codex Ephraemi Rescriptus (~450; complete).

== Healing on the Sabbath ==
Continuing the theme of the Sabbath from the previous chapter, Mark 3 opens with Jesus healing a man with a shriveled or withered hand on the Sabbath in the Synagogue. The word ἐξηραμμένην (exērammenēn) is translated as 'paralyzed' in the International Standard Version. Mark uses the adverb πάλιν (palin, again), indicating this is the synagogue in Capernaum, the same as the one in Mark 1:21–28, although the New American Standard Bible reads "a synagogue". The event took place on a subsequent Sabbath to the one mentioned in Mark 2:23–28, possibly the next Sabbath: the American Bible Society's Contemporary English Version interprets the passage this way: The next time Jesus went into the synagogue ..., as does the biblical commentator George Maclear.

"Some people", probably the Pharisees, who were mentioned in Mark 2:24, 27, were there specifically waiting to see if Jesus would heal someone on the Sabbath, so that they could accuse him of breaking it. Rabbis of the time would allow healing on the Sabbath only if the person was in great danger, a situation his hand would not qualify for. The Jewish Encyclopedia article on Jesus notes: "... stricter rabbis allowed only the saving of life to excuse the slightest curtailment of the Sabbath rest (Shab. xxii. 6)". In Luke's parallel account, it is "the scribes and Pharisees" who "watch Him closely".

Jesus asks the people "Which is lawful on the Sabbath: to do good or to do evil, to save life or to kill?" (3:4) They do not answer and he angrily looks around at the crowd and is "distressed at their stubborn hearts" (3:5). Methodist founder John Wesley suggested that his adversaries were already seeking occasion to kill him. Jesus tells the man to stretch out his hand, which he does and then, seemingly instantaneously, it is healed. Many other stories of healing at the time involved the healer doing work in some way to effect a cure as compared to this quick almost effortless action here. Mark could be highlighting how great he viewed Jesus' powers as being. Jesus also equates not doing good with doing evil and says it is more important, even or perhaps especially, to not let evil and suffering occur through inaction.

According to Mark, this miracle is the spur which sets the Pharisees, as well as the Herodians, against Jesus, having them go out after this and plot to kill him. Thus the reaction of a substantial number of Jews has gone from being amazed to one of outright opposition. Mark has already begun to foreshadow Jesus' death, with this as well as the saying about the bridegroom and fasting in Mark 2:19–20. Some find it improbable these two groups worked together, as the Pharisees opposed Rome and Herod was backed by and supported Rome, see also Iudaea Province. The Herodian party was not a religious grouping, but according to Maclear it did hold Sadducean opinions. Christopher Tuckett observes that a partnership between the Pharisees and the supporters of Herod Antipas would have been historically "implausible". Mark, however, may have been highlighting the dual nature and seriousness of the opposition to Jesus.

This event is also reported in Matthew 12:9–14, although Jesus asks there about how one would save a sheep on the Sabbath and how helping a person is more important than helping a sheep. Luke 6:6–11 is almost the same as this section of Mark, although Luke does not state that they planned to kill him, only that they were "furious" and talked about "what they might do to Jesus".

== Movement of the crowd ==
Jesus then "withdraws", ἀνεχώρησεν (anechōrēsen), and goes down by a lake, presumably the Sea of Galilee, and people follow him there. Some writers, such as the American commentator Albert Barnes, see the word as meaning flight, as it comes after Mark talks about the plot against Jesus, "... to the lonely regions which surrounded the sea, where he might be in obscurity, and avoid their designs against his life", but it could just as easily mean leaving Capernaum to go to the nearby sea. Mark says the people had come from "... Judea, Jerusalem, Idumea, and the regions across the Jordan and around Tyre and Sidon". (3:8) Mark thus shows that people are coming from many areas, not just Galilee. Whether these people were non-Jews is unclear as the non-Jewish areas listed also contained Jewish populations. Another group of the time to consider is the Jewish proselytes.

Protestant commentator Heinrich Meyer divides the movement of the crowds into two sections:

- verse 7b: a great multitude from Galilee followed him (from Capernaum to the sea);
- verses 7c and 8: a great multitude from Judea ^{8} and Jerusalem and Idumea and beyond the Jordan, and those (the Jews) about Tyre and Sidon, heard how many things He was doing, and came to him.

Jesus has the disciples prepare a boat for him to avoid "crowding", because "... he had healed many, so that those with diseases were pushing forward to touch him" (3:10) and then he heals many of the sick. Evil (or unclean) spirits in the people brought before him fall down whenever they see him, or as soon as ever they catch sight of him, and call him the Son of God, but he tells them not to tell people who he is, continuing the theme of the Messianic Secret.

== Choosing of the Twelve Apostles ==
After highlighting the growing crowd following Jesus, Mark says Jesus went up a mountain and called twelve, whom he appointed Apostles, with the power to preach and "drive out demons". Some manuscripts of Mark do not have Jesus call them Apostles in verse 3:14. Verse 6:30 may be the only time he uses the word, which is most frequently (68 out of 79) used by Luke the Evangelist and Paul of Tarsus, see Strong's G652. It is perhaps symbolic that this occurs on a mountain, a height where people can be met by God in the Jewish tradition, such as Moses talking to God on Mount Sinai, see also the Sermon on the Mount. Mark pictures Jesus as drawing large multitudes to his teaching, and shifts from mountains to lakes to houses at will, creating an evocative landscape that some find lacking plausibility, although the area contains such geographic features.

=== Verse 16 ===
And Simon he surnamed Peter;

He appoints Simon, called Peter, James, John, Andrew, Philip, Bartholomew, Matthew, Thomas, a second James, Thaddaeus, Simon whom Mark calls a Zealot, and lastly Judas Iscariot.

Luke's lists in Luke 6:12–16 and Acts 1:13 do not include a Thaddaeus, but instead list "Judas, son of James" or "Judas the brother of James" in the KJV, which some have asserted are two names for the same person, Jude Thaddaeus. Luke also has the story of the Seventy Disciples. Matthew's list is the same as Mark in 10:1–4, although a few western manuscripts of Matthew have a Lebbaeus. This might also indicate that by the time of the writing of the Gospels the exact recollection of the "minor" Apostles had become uncertain, and that there is no "Jude Thaddaeus", a creation of later hagiography. John's Gospel lists no Bartholomew, although John's Nathanael is usually equated with him.

Mark says that the brothers James and John were given the title Boanerges, which Mark tells us means "Sons of Thunder", although many modern scholars disagree with this translation. Many explanations have been given for this title but none commands a consensus. Mark does not explain why Jesus gave Simon the name Peter, meaning rock. Matthew 16:18 has his naming in connection with the church and John 1:42 has it relate to his character. It could also have an ironic meaning, as even Peter denies Jesus in the end.

Philip and Andrew are both Greek names, also Thaddaeus and Lebbaeus. Some Jews, especially from places like Galilee where there were substantial non-Jewish populations, did have a Greek name as well as a Jewish name.

The second Simon is called a kananaios, probably derived from the Aramaic word qan'ānā, meaning a Zealot, which might mean he belonged to a political movement in rebellion against Rome, but might also mean he was religiously zealous. Luke uses the Greek term zēlōtēs.

Iscariot might be Judas' last name or might be a reference to where he came from, meaning "man of Kerioth" It may also be derived from sicarii. The fact that there are twelve Apostles is seen as being related to the Twelve tribes of Israel.

Jesus will "send them out", the Greek verb apostolien (Strong's G649) meaning to send out, to do the work he has been doing but without him being present. Many churches interpret this as his founding of the church, as he creates a special group to work in his name without him. See also the Great Commission.

== A house divided ==
Jesus goes to someone's house (or "the house", possibly Peter's house, verse 19 in some versions, verse 20 in others), and a large crowd follows him there. According to Mark, this prevented Jesus and his disciples from being able to eat. "When his family (hoi par' autou) heard about this, they went to take charge of him, for they said, 'He is out of his mind.'" (3:21), or "beside himself", exestē (Strong's G1839), which could be read as Jesus' family accusing him of being crazy or describing what others had said about Jesus. Either way they go to assert their control over him, perhaps to stop him from embarrassing the family. Hearing Jesus is being followed by so many people does not seem to accord with their view of him. Whether it was Jesus teaching and attracting large crowds or not eating that disturbs them so much is not clear. A few early manuscripts have "the scribes and the others" instead of his family, but these are usually seen as alterations perhaps designed to tone down the impression of Jesus' own family toward him.

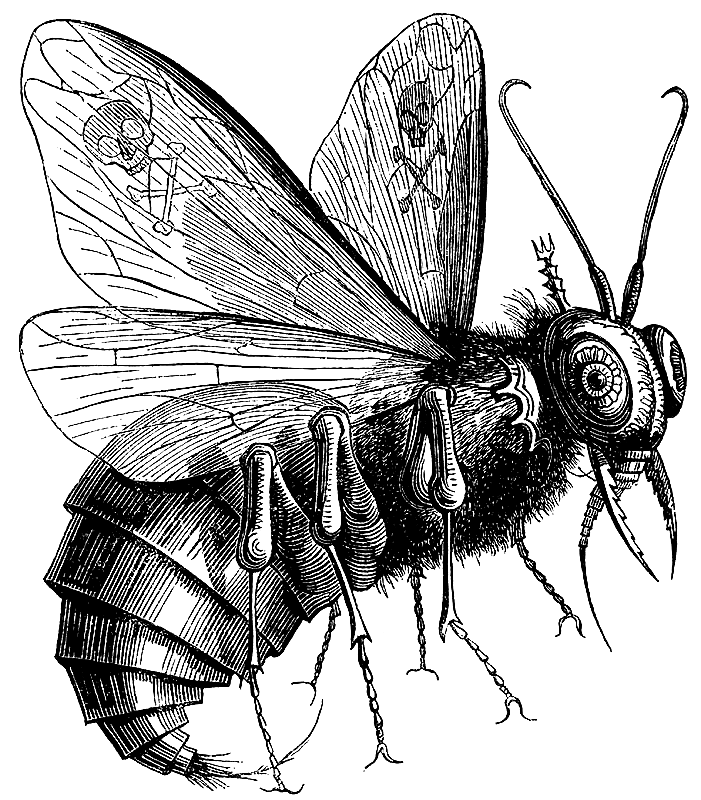
Beelzebub as depicted in Jacques Collin de Plancy's Dictionnaire Infernal (Paris, 1863)

Scribes from Jerusalem, who Matthew says were Pharisees, come and accuse him of something worse than being crazy, using Beelzebub, and/or the "prince of demons" to drive out demons. His power over the demons, they assert, comes from evil power itself. Beelzebub is thought to mean perhaps "lord of the flies" or "lord of dung" or "lord of the height or dwelling", but no certainty exists as to its exact meaning. They do not dispute that he did in fact drive out the demons. They seem to believe Jesus' power is beyond human capabilities and must be supernatural in origin. The charge of Jesus using evil powers was probably made against him to his followers for quite some time after his death. The Jesus Seminar feels the version in Luke 11:15–17 is "red" ("authentic") and calls it "the Beelzebul controversy". Mark 3:20–21 is determined to be "pink" ("a close approximation of what Jesus did") and is called "Jesus' relatives come to get him" as are Mark 3:31–35, Matt 12:46–50, and the Gospel of Thomas 99:1–3 where they are called "True relatives".

Mark often has Jesus using analogies, metaphors or riddles, called parables by Mark. Jesus replies:

How can Satan cast out Satan? And if a kingdom be divided against itself, that kingdom cannot stand. And if a house be divided against itself, that house cannot stand. And if Satan rise up against himself, and be divided, he cannot stand, but hath an end.

No man can enter into a strong man's house, and spoil his goods, except he will first bind the strong man; and then he will spoil his house.

Verily I say unto you, All sins shall be forgiven unto the sons of men, and blasphemies wherewith soever they shall blaspheme: But he that shall blaspheme against the Holy Ghost hath never forgiveness, but is in danger of eternal damnation. (3:23–29)

If Jesus is working against what is evil, such as the demons, then this cannot be the work of Satan, as Satan would be working against himself. Jesus then compares himself to a thief going into a "strong man's house", and binding him to "spoil his house", i.e. to rob him. The “strong man” is Satan. Satan, says Jesus, is strong and must be restrained in order to be robbed. He is robbing Satan of the possession of the people, or the house could be seen as the world itself. The New Living Translation adds the interpretation that there is "someone even stronger". Maclear asserts that "the Stronger than the Strong is Christ".

Jesus thus implies what he has been doing is directly against Satan and that his motives are Satan's utmost ruin. His power, he asserts, is good and so must also come from a good source, God.

Jesus also makes the claim that all sins can be forgiven, except for an eternal sin, such as blasphemy against the Holy Spirit (3:28–29). Mark inserts his own explanation as to why Jesus said this, stating "He said this because they were saying, "He has an evil spirit." (3:30), thus Jesus according to Mark is saying that accusing him of using Satan for his power is in effect calling the work of God evil and failing to see the work of God in Jesus' actions. The parallels in Matthew 12:31–32 and Luke 12:10 and the Gospel of Thomas 44 call this the unforgivable sin. Unforgivable sins are also listed in Hebrews 6:4–6 and 10:26 as well as 1 John 5:16–17. There is also a possible link with 1 Corinthians 12:2–3. His first answer to the charge, that a "house divided" cannot stand, has become a common piece of wisdom, the most famous modern example is Lincoln's use of this phrase during the 1858 senatorial election campaign against Stephen Douglas. Lincoln used the metaphor of a "house divided" to describe the situation of the United States on the eve of the Civil War.

== Jesus' family ==
Jesus' mother and brothers arrive. Remaining outside, they "send someone" inside to ask Jesus to come out. Jesus replies, speaking to the crowd around him, "Here are my mother and my brothers! Whoever does God's will is my brother and sister and mother" (3:34–35).

Bede draws attention to Jesus' priorities here: "He declines [to come out], not as though He refused the dutiful service of His mother, but to shew that He owes more to His Father’s mysteries than to His mother’s feelings." Jesus' answer to his family, that those who follow him are his family is, according to Kilgallen, Jesus' way of underlining "... the fact that his life has been changed to such a degree that family ties no longer come before those whom he teaches about the kingdom of God". Jesus puts loyalty to God above loyalty to family. Family ties were considered very important in the society of the time, and some people even today are troubled by this seeming conflict between Jesus and his family. Jesus however states that his ties, and his respect and love due to his family, will go to those who obey God. Jesus' family is mentioned again in Mark 6:3. The story of Jesus and his family is also found in the Gospel of Thomas as saying 99. In Mark 10:28–31, Peter says they have left everything to follow Jesus and he lists the great rewards as well as persecutions they will secure through following him.

These incidents occur in all the Synoptic Gospels. In Matthew they occur in 12:22–50, and in Luke they are split up between 8:19–21 and 11:14–28. Neither Matthew nor Luke though state that Jesus' family thought he was "... out of his mind". John, while mentioning none of these incidents, relates in chapter 7 how "... even his own brothers did not believe in him" because he would not go to the Feast of Tabernacles with them and perform miracles, although he later goes there in secret. John 6:66 says "many of his disciples turned back and no longer followed him". The negative view of Jesus' family may be related to the conflict between Paul and Jewish Christians.

There is much disagreement over whether these "brothers" referred to here are Jesus' actual brothers or merely stepbrothers or cousins. The official Roman Catholic and Eastern Orthodox doctrine is that Mary was a perpetual virgin, and so could not have had any other children besides Jesus, thus making these Jesus' half brothers, sons of Joseph from another, unrecorded, marriage, or cousins. Only Tertullian seems to have questioned this in the early Church. Islam also holds that Mary was a perpetual virgin, as did many of the early Protestants, although many Protestants today do not hold to the doctrine of perpetual virginity, and would thus believe that these are Jesus' full brothers. A few early manuscripts also have "and your sisters" in verse 3:32.

This section gives a clear example of Mark's sandwich technique, where one story is woven into the center of another. Mark has highlighted two reactions to Jesus and his teaching and acts: one of faith, such as that of his followers, and one of disbelief and hostility. Jesus explains the nature of the effect of his teachings on others in the Parable of the Sower in Mark 4.

== See also ==
- John the Baptist
- Mary the mother of Jesus

== Sources ==
- Brown, Raymond E., An Introduction to the New Testament, Doubleday 1997 ISBN 0-385-24767-2
- Brown, Raymond E. et al., The New Jerome Biblical Commentary, Prentice Hall 1990 ISBN 0-13-614934-0
- Kilgallen, John J., A Brief Commentary on the Gospel of Mark, Paulist Press 1989 ISBN 0-8091-3059-9
- Miller, Robert J. (Editor), The Complete Gospels, Polebridge Press 1994 ISBN 0-06-065587-9

Preceded by Mark 2	Chapters of the Bible; Gospel of Mark	Succeeded by Mark 4
