= Lamp under a bushel =

Parable taught by Jesus of Nazareth according to Christian gospels

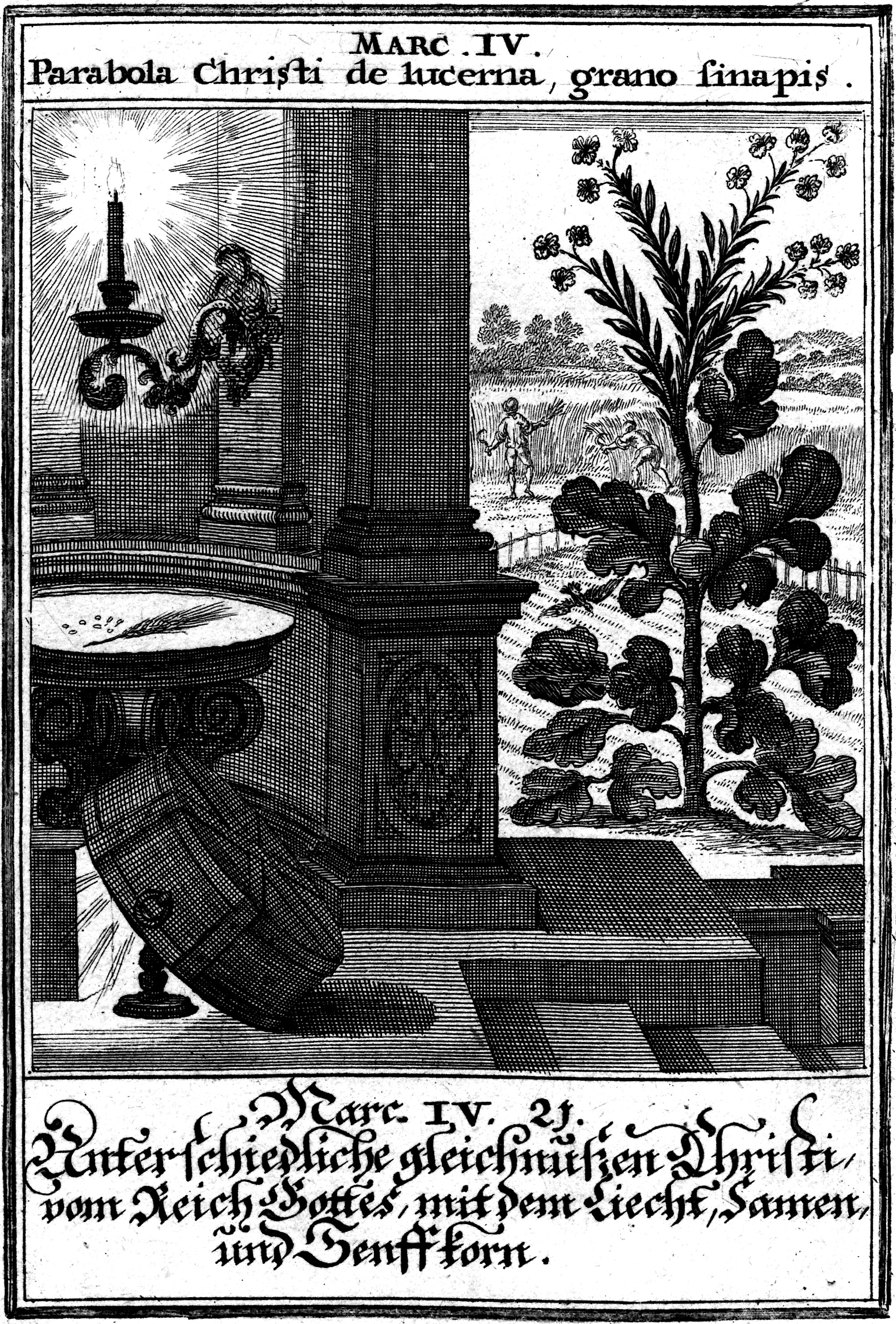
An illustration of the parable, together with the parable of the Growing Seed, which follows it in Mark chapter 4

The parable of the lamp under a bushel (also known as the lamp under a bowl) is one of the parables of Jesus. It appears in Matthew 5:14–15, Mark 4:21–25 and Luke 8:16–18. In Matthew, the parable is a continuation of the discourse on salt and light in Jesus' Sermon on the Mount, whereas in Mark and Luke, it is connected with Jesus' explanation of the Parable of the Sower. The parable also appears in the non-canonical Gospel of Thomas as saying 33.

== Passage ==
"And no man, when he hath lighted a lamp, covereth it with a vessel, or putteth it under a bed; but putteth it on a stand, that they that enter in may see the light. For nothing is hid, that shall not be made manifest; nor [anything] secret, that shall not be known and come to light. Take heed therefore how ye hear: for whosoever hath, to him shall be given; and whosoever hath not, from him shall be taken away even that which he thinketh he hath."

— Luke 8:16–18, King James Version

== Related passages ==
In the Gospel of Luke, Jesus says:

"No one, when he has lit a lamp, puts it in a cellar or under a basket, but on a stand, that those who come in may see the light. The lamp of the body is the eye. Therefore when your eye is good, your whole body is also full of light; but when it is evil, your body also is full of darkness. Therefore see whether the light that is in you isn't darkness. If therefore your whole body is full of light, having no part dark, it will be wholly full of light, as when the lamp with its bright shining gives you light."

— Luke 11:33–36, World English Bible

In the Gospel of Matthew, Jesus says:

"Nor do they light a lamp and then put it under a bushel basket; it is set on a lampstand, where it gives light to all in the house. Just so, your light must shine before others, that they may see your good deeds and glorify your heavenly Father."

— Matthew 5:15–16, New American Bible Revised Edition

In the Gospel of Mark, Jesus says:

"Is a lamp brought in to be placed under a bushel basket or under a bed, and not to be placed on a lampstand? For there is nothing hidden except to be made visible; nothing is secret except to come to light. "

— Mark 4:21–22, New American Bible Revised Edition

== Interpretation ==
The key idea of the parable is that "Light is to be revealed, not concealed." The light here has been interpreted as referring to Jesus, or to His message, or to the believer's response to that message.

Jesus quotes a pessimistic proverb on how the rich get richer and the poor keep losing even the little they have. He later denounces the saying in the next parable in Mark, which alludes to Joel 3:13 in assuring that God's judgment on the ruling powers will come and holds out revolutionary hope to those resigned to thinking that nothing will ever change.

Cornelius a Lapide, commenting on this parable, writes that allegorically, "saints Hilary, Ambrose, and Bede say, that it is here meant that the light of the Gospel was not to be shut up within the narrow confines of Judæa, but to be placed upon the height of Rome, that it might illuminate all the subject nations".

John McEvilly writes that "These words have the same object as the preceding, to stimulate the Apostles to shine as lights before the world, to enlighten the surrounding darkness, and impart to all the world the light of a holy, spotless life, and of pure teaching. As a city on a hill cannot be hid, so neither can the Apostles, from their exalted position, be concealed from the eyes of men; and, hence, their duty, to live so as to edify men. As no one lights a candle for the purpose of concealing its light, so neither did God constitute the Apostles as the lights of the world, in order to hide their light and detain the truth of God in injustice. Their duty is quite plain, viz., to diffuse this light far and near; to be deterred by no obstacles, in the free exercise of the exalted commission confided to them by God Himself, and to show forth the brilliancy of their virtues, and by their example to allure others to God."

Heinrich Meyer states that the connection between the sayings and Jesus' explanation of the parable of the sower is substantially the same in Mark and Luke:

"But if by such explanations as I have now given upon your question ... I kindle a light for you, you must also let the same shine further, ... and thence follows your obligation ... to listen aright to my teaching."

== Proverb ==
The parable is the source of the proverb "to hide one's light under a bushel", the use of the word "bushel", an obsolete word for bowl (now relegated to usage as a unit of measure), appearing in William Tyndale's translation of the New Testament: "Neither do men light a candle, and put it under a bushel, but on a candlestick, and it lighteth all them which are in the house." The original Greek is μόδιος (modios), usually translated as "basket".

== See also ==
- Life of Jesus
- Ministry of Jesus
- Parable of the Ten Virgins
