= George Huntington (disambiguation) =

George Huntington (1850–1916) was a physician, the namesake of Huntington's disease.

George Huntington may also refer to:

- George Huntington (politician, born 1770) (1770–1841), member of the 34th New York State Legislature
- George Huntington (politician, born 1796) (1796–1866), New York politician
- George Sumner Huntington (1861–1927), physician
- George Huntington (priest) (1825–1905), English clergyman

== See also ==
- George Huntingford (1748–1832), English bishop
- George Huntingdon (disambiguation)
- Huntington (disambiguation)
- George Huntington Hartford (1833–1917), American businessman
