= Mark 4 =

- ← chapter 3 chapter 5 →
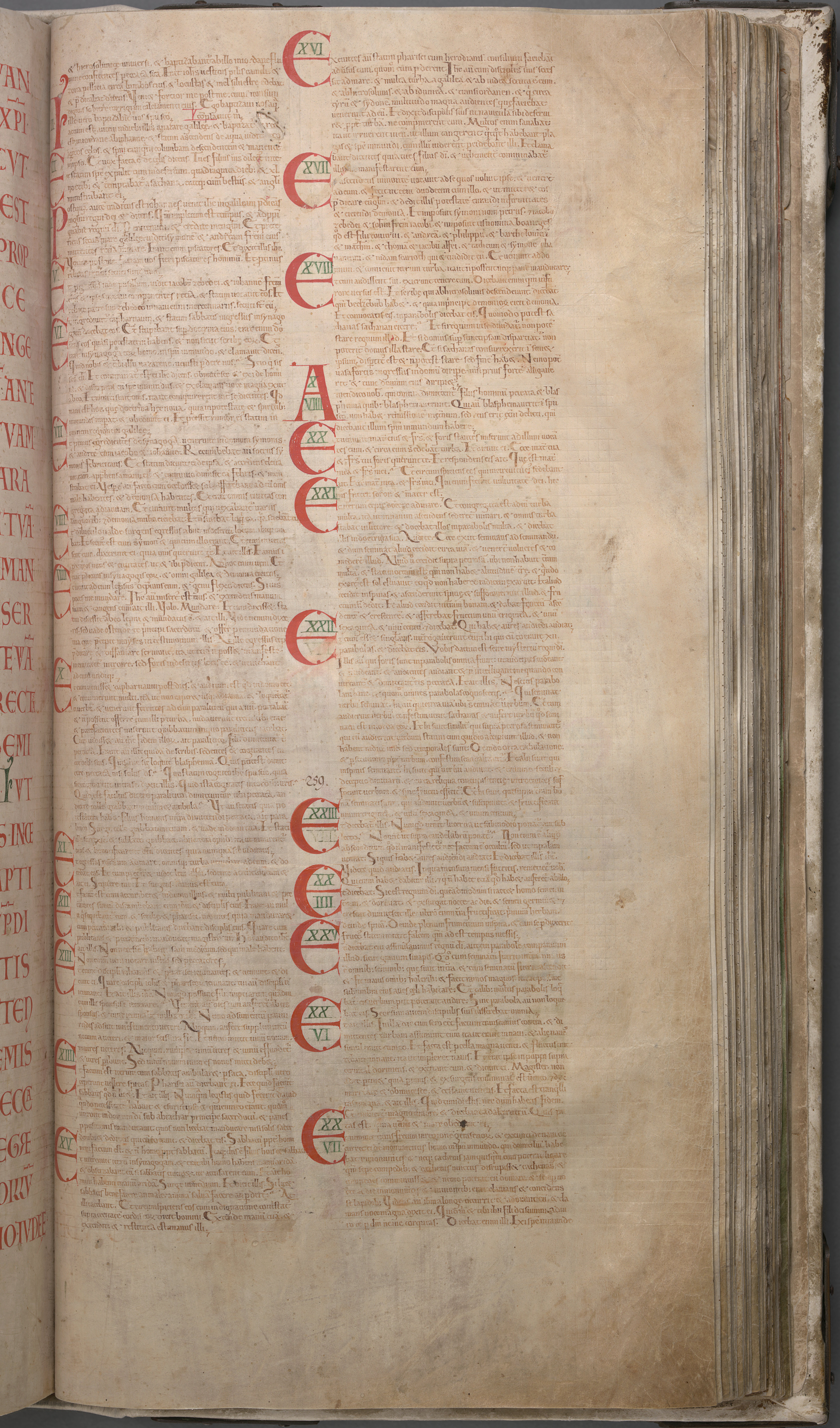
- The Latin text of Mark 1:5–5:8 in Codex Gigas (13th century)
- Book: Gospel of Mark
- Category: Gospel
- Christian Bible part: New Testament
- Order in the Christian part: 2

Mark 4 is the fourth chapter of the Gospel of Mark in the New Testament of the Christian Bible. It tells the parable of the Sower, with its explanation, and the parable of the Mustard Seed. Both of these parables are paralleled in Matthew and Luke, but this chapter also has a parable unique to Mark, the Seed Growing Secretly. The chapter ends with Jesus calming the storm.

== Text ==
The original text was written in Koine Greek. This chapter is divided into 41 verses.

=== Textual witnesses ===
Some early manuscripts containing the text of this chapter are:

- Codex Vaticanus (AD 325–350; complete)
- Codex Sinaiticus (AD 330–360; complete)
- Codex Bezae (c. AD 400; complete)
- Codex Washingtonianus (c. AD 400; complete)
- Codex Alexandrinus (AD 400–440; complete)
- Codex Ephraemi Rescriptus (c. AD 450; complete)

== Parables ==
Jesus goes again (see Mark 3:7–9) to the lake (the Sea of Galilee). He begins to teach by the sea or "on the shore", and then sits in a boat, and speaks to "a great multitude" (Mark 4:1). The Pulpit Commentary notes that "the Greek adjective, according to the most approved reading, is πλεῖστος, pleistos, the superlative of πολὺς, polus, and should be rendered 'a very great' multitude. The room and the little courtyard no longer sufficed for the multitudes that came to him." From there the text suggests that "he spoke many things in parables"; from the many, Heinrich Meyer argues that Mark presents "a selection".

=== The Sower ===
The first parable Mark relates is the parable of the sower, with Jesus perhaps speaking of himself as a sower or farmer, and the seed as his word. Johann Bengel refers to Christ as the sower, along with others who proclaim the gospel, but the Jamieson, Fausset and Brown commentary notes that the question, "who is the sower?" is not answered here, "because if 'the word of God' be the seed, every scatterer of that precious seed must be regarded as a sower".

Much of the seed comes to no account but "[some] seed fell on good soil. It came up, grew and produced a crop, multiplying thirty, sixty, or even a hundred times." (4:8) His disciples do not understand why he is teaching in parables or even what the meaning of the parables are. Later, after the crowds have left and Jesus tells them "The secret of the kingdom of God has been given to you. But to those on the outside everything is said in parables so that, 'they may be ever seeing but never perceiving, and ever hearing but never understanding; otherwise they might turn and be forgiven!'" (4:11–12), with Jesus quoting Isaiah 6:9–10. Early Christians used this passage from Isaiah "...to explain the lack of a positive response to Jesus and his followers from their fellow Jews" (Miller 21). He rebukes the twelve and "those around him", in many translations, based on the Greek and Syriac texts, but "the twelve who were with him" in the Vulgate, for not understanding him, and explains his meaning, and that those who accept his word, i.e. his teaching, are the ones who will produce the large "crop".

This parable is also found in Luke 8:4–15 and Matthew 13:1–23, and it forms Saying 9 of the Gospel of Thomas.

=== Lamp on a Stand ===
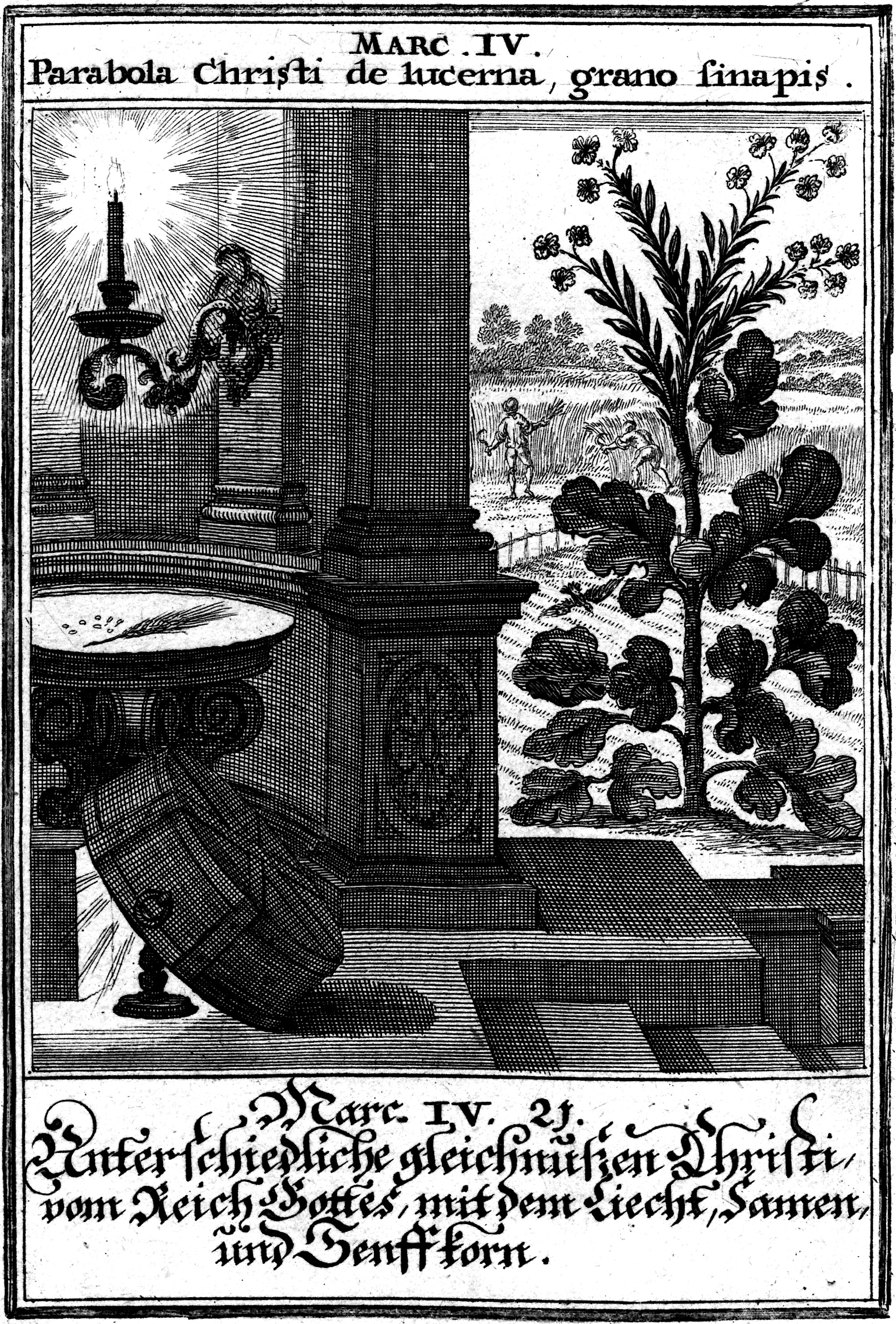
An illustration of the parable of "a lamp on a stand", together with the parable of the Growing Seed, in Mark 4

Jesus then speaks of a lamp on a stand, that one does not hide it, but allows it to shine (Mark 4:21). He says, "For whatever is hidden is meant to be disclosed, and whatever is concealed is meant to be brought out into the open. If anyone has ears to hear, let him hear," (4:22–23) the last sentence being, judging from all available texts, a favorite saying of Jesus. This is also in Luke 11:33 and perhaps in Matthew 10:26–27. "'Consider carefully what you hear,' he continued. 'With the measure you use, it will be measured to you—and even more. Whoever has will be given more; whoever does not have, even what he has will be taken from him.'" (4:24–25) The Scholars Version translates these verses like such: "...The standard you apply will be the standard applied to you, and then some. In fact, to those who have, more will be given, and from those who don't have, even what they do have will be taken away!" Mark 4:25 also occurs in the Parable of the Talents (Matt 25:29, Luke 19:26) and Matt 13:12, Luke 8:18, Thomas 41. Mark 4:24 also occurs in Matt 7:2 and Luke 6:38.

=== The Growing Seed ===
The parable of the Growing Seed (verses 26–29) and the parable of the Mustard Seed (verses 30–32) follow, each showing analogies with nature and small beginnings yielding much more in the end. They are both illustrations of the growth of the kingdom of God. In the Seed Growing Secretly Jesus used the metaphor of a man planting a seed and then paying it no attention until "As soon as the grain is ripe, he puts the sickle to it, because the harvest has come." (29) This is partially replicated in Thomas 21 The mustard seed, says Jesus, is like the kingdom of God because it starts out as the smallest seed and yet "...becomes the largest of all garden plants, with such big branches that the birds of the air can perch in its shade." (32) This is in Matthew 13:31–32 and Luke 13:18-19. It is also saying 20 of Thomas.

== Great Miracles ==
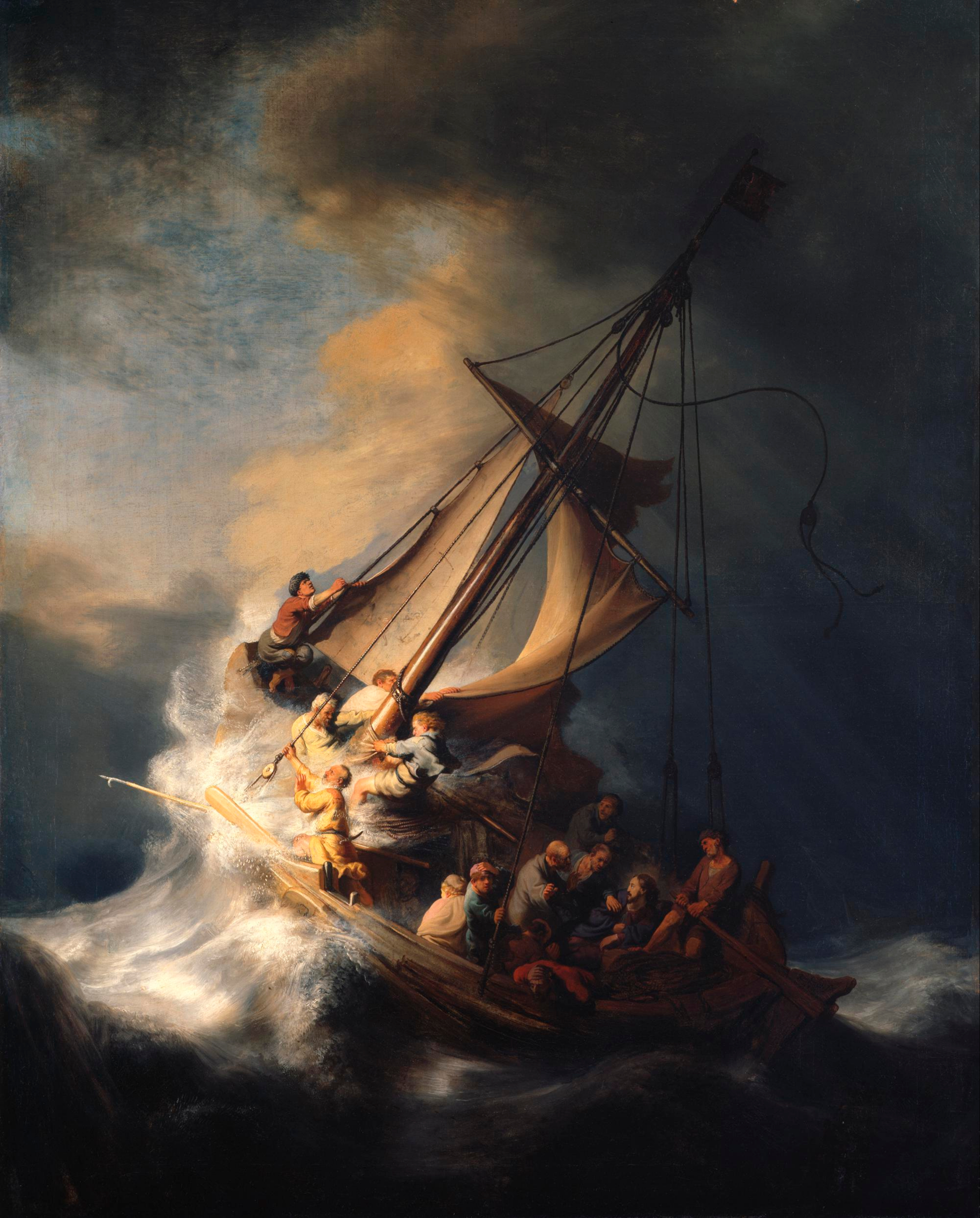
Rembrandt's The Storm on the Sea of Galilee, 1633

From Mark 4:35 to the end of chapter 5, "four striking works follow each other without a break". These accounts of miracles raise the stakes over miracles which have been reported before. Mark probably intends to demonstrate the greatness of Jesus' authority (ἐξουσíα, exousia). Chapter 4 ends with an account of Jesus calming the storm at sea. He is sleeping while crossing the lake in a boat with his disciples. Mark notes that they left a large crowd, that they took Him "just as He was", and that other boats were with Him. A storm comes up and they frantically wake him:

"He woke up and rebuked the wind, and said to the sea, `Peace! Be still!`. Then the wind ceased and there was a dead calm...And they were filled with great awe and said to one another `Who then is this, that even the wind and the sea obey him?" (Mark 4:39–41, NRSV)

The Greek: Σιώπα (siōpa) in verse 39 means "silence", and is so translated in the New Living Translation and the Holman Christian Standard Bible.

Dr. R. A. Cole, author of the commentary on Mark in the Tyndale New Testament Commentary series, writes:

"We must remember that miracles are not meaningless magic but designed to show us who Jesus was."

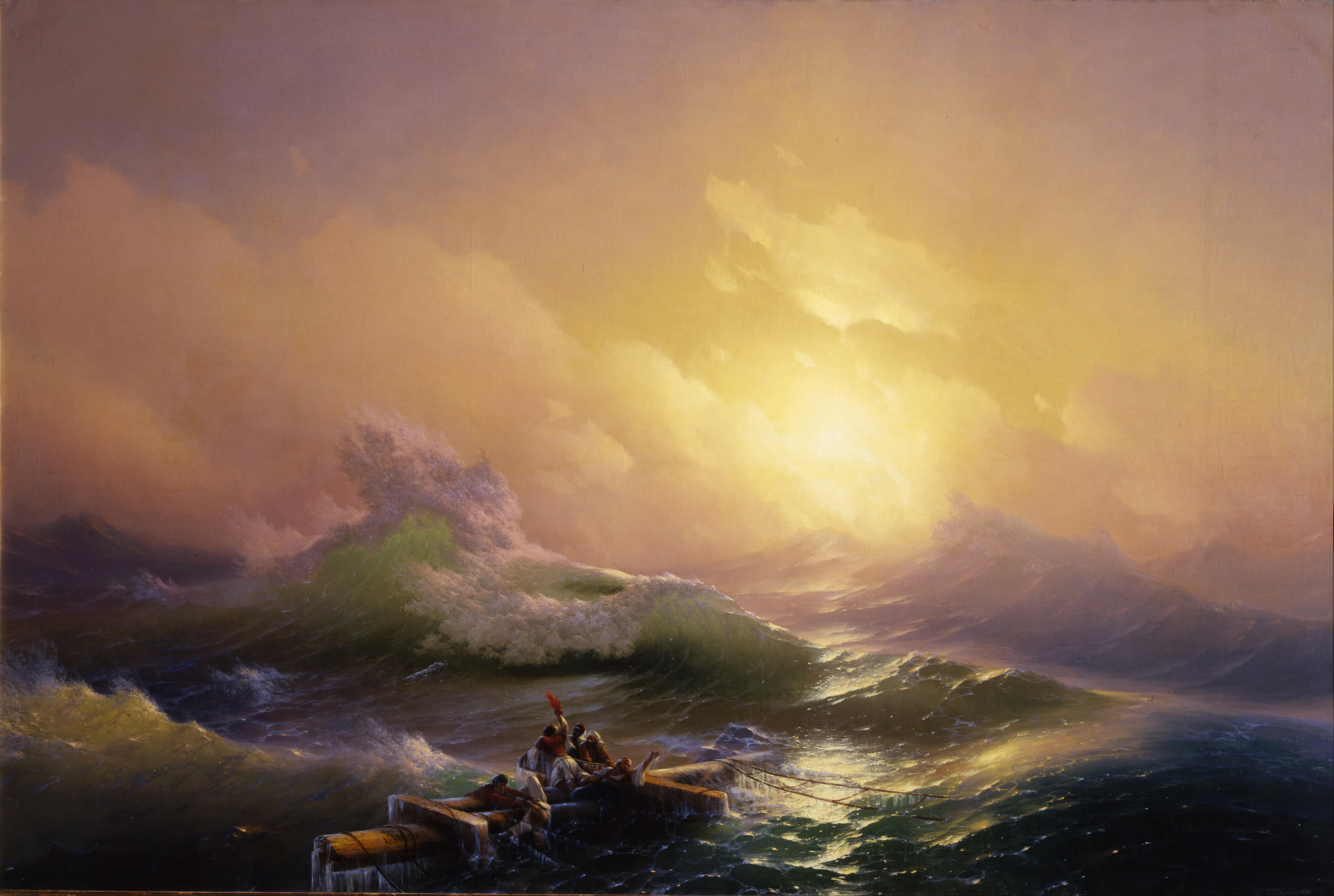
The Ninth Wave by Ivan Constantinovich Aivazovsky 1817–1900

The story of the calming of the sea and the miracles which follow demonstrate Jesus' authority over nature. Jesus has authority over not only men but even an untamable man, delivering the demoniac from not merely one demon but a whole army of demons (see Mark 5). At the climax of these miracle accounts, Jesus does not merely heal the sick, but he raises the dead girl, all of which sets the reader up for a greater contrast when Jesus is rejected in his home town of Nazareth (6:1–6) in Mark 6 (see France for an extended discussion).

Preceded by Mark 3	Chapters of the Bible; Gospel of Mark	Succeeded by Mark 5
