= John Bacchus Dykes =

English clergyman and hymnwriter (1823–1876)

John Bacchus Dykes M.A., D.C.L.
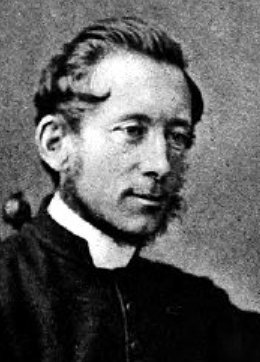
- Born: 10 March 1823; Kingston upon Hull, Yorkshire, England
- Died: 22 January 1876 (aged 52); Ticehurst, Sussex, England
- Education: Katharine Hall (later St Catharine's College), Cambridge
- Occupation: Vicar of St Oswald's Church, Durham
- Spouse: Susannah Thomlinson Kingston (m. 1850)
- Parent(s): William Hey Dykes (1792–1864) and Elizabeth Huntington (1792–1867)

Ecclesiastical career
- Church: Church of England
- Title: The Rev. Dr.

John Bacchus Dykes (10 March 1823 – 22 January 1876) was an English clergyman and hymnwriter.

== Early life ==
He was born in Hull, England, the fifth child and third son of William Hey Dikes or Dykes, a ship builder, and Elizabeth, daughter of Bacchus Huntington, a surgeon of Sculcoates, Yorkshire, and granddaughter of the Rev. William Huntington, Vicar of Kirk Ella. His paternal grandparents were the Rev. Thomas Dykes of Hull, and Mary, daughter of William Hey. He was also a cousin of the Rev. George Huntington. Dykes was a younger brother of the poet and hymnwriter Eliza Alderson, and wrote tunes for at least four of her hymns.

William Hey Dikes in 1812 entered a shipbuilding partnership with William Barnes of Hull, Barnes, Dikes & King. They launched the Ferraby at their yard at Wincolmlee on the River Hull in 1815. Dikes, King & Co. launched the Zoroaster at Hull in 1818.

By the age of 10, John Bacchus Dikes played the organ at St John's Church in Myton, Hull, where his paternal grandfather (who had built the church) was vicar and his uncle (also Thomas) was organist. He was taught by the Hull organist George Skelton. He also played the violin and the piano. He studied first at Kingston College, Hull.

William Hey Dikes was manager of a branch of the Yorkshire Bank opened in Hull in 1834. He was later a banker in Wakefield, from November 1841 at the Wakefield and Barnsley Union Bank, 65 Westgate. The family moved there at the end of 1841; it was mentioned at the time that John was an organist at his grandfather's church. John attended the West Riding Proprietary School in Wakefield, to 1843.

== Cambridge and first clerical appointments ==
Dykes matriculated in 1843 (with surname Dikes) at Katharine Hall, Cambridge. There he was the second Dykes Scholar: the second beneficiary after his elder brother, Thomas, of an endowment established in 1840 in honour of his grandfather. As an extra-curricular subject, he studied music under Thomas Attwood Walmisley, whose madrigal society he joined. He also joined the Peterhouse Musical Society (later renamed the Cambridge University Musical Society), becoming its fourth President, immediately following his friend, William Thomson. His diaries and correspondence, the work of Joseph Thomas Fowler and press reports show that a number of his part-songs were performed by the CUMS. He graduated B.A. in 1847 as a senior optime as Dykes, and M.A. in 1851.

Dykes was appointed to the curacy of Malton, North Yorkshire, in 1847. He was ordained deacon at York Minster in January 1848. He was awarded the Mus.Doc. degree by Cambridge in 1849.

== Durham ==
In 1849 Dykes was appointed a minor canon of Durham Cathedral (an appointment which he held until his death), and shortly thereafter to the office of precentor. Between 1850 and 1852 he lived at Hollingside House, now the official residence of the Vice Chancellor of the University of Durham. In 1862 he relinquished the precentorship (to the dismay of Sir Frederick Ouseley) on his appointment to the living of St Oswald's, Durham, situated almost in the shadow of the cathedral, where he remained until his death in 1876.

=== Anglo-Catholic views ===
Dykes was from an evangelical family background. He moved to an Anglo-Catholic position in the Church of England during his Cambridge years, and ultimately became a ritualist. He was in sympathy with the Oxford Movement. He was a member of the Society of the Holy Cross.

At this period, antagonism between the evangelical and Anglo-Catholic wings of the Church of England was sharp. A test case concerned the Brighton-based Rev. John Purchas (1823–72) who, as a consequence of a Privy Council judgment which bore his name, was compelled to desist from such practices as facing east during the celebration of Holy Communion, using wafer bread, and wearing vestments other than cassock and surplice. The London-based Alexander Mackonochie saw his worship style characterised by Lord Shaftesbury as "in outward form and ritual…the worship of Jupiter or Juno"). He was pursued through the courts, until he resigned his living in 1882.

Dykes's treatment at the hands of the evangelical party, which included Bishop Charles Baring, was largely played out locally. Archdeacon Edward Prest held strongly to anti-ritualist views. The situation in County Durham in 1851 was that Wesleyan Methodist congregations outnumbered the Anglicans. Something on which Baring and Dykes agreed was that the strength of nonconformity reflected on failures of the Church of England. The Dean of Durham, from 1869 William Charles Lake, was on the other hand a High Churchman, and not an opponent of ritualism, who put his views on the issue on record in a letter to The Times in 1880. He took on Baring over restoration of the cathedral, and succeeded shortly after Dykes had died.

Dykes wish to recruit George Peake as a curate, for his expanding parish. Peake was an Oxford graduate, ordained priest in 1872, who had been a curate in Hull and then had moved to Houghton le Spring. Dykes had a positive recommendation for Peake from the Rev. Francis Richard Grey. Grey, Rector of Morpeth, Northumberland, signed the 1873 "Declaration on Confession and Absolution", put together by Edward Bouverie Pusey. Baring refused to license Peake: while St Oswald's was a parish that required two curates, Baring asked for a pledge they would not use ritualist practices.

Dykes then sought from the Court of Queen's Bench a writ of mandamus, requiring the Bishop to do so. He retained both John Coleridge and Archibald John Stephens Q.C. Stephens had defended W. J. E. Bennett in 1872 in the doctrinal case brought to the Privy Council by Thomas Byard Sheppard (see Sheppard family (clothiers)). But the judge Sir Colin Blackburn refused to interfere in what he saw to be a matter of the Bishop's sole discretion. In 1874 Dykes published an open letter, criticising Baring's campaign against ritualistic practices.

== Later life and death ==
Dykes's failure to change Baring's stance was followed by a gradual deterioration in his physical and mental health. It necessitated absence (which was to prove permanent) from St Oswald's from March 1875. Rest and the bracing Swiss air proving unavailing, Dykes went to recover on the south coast of England.

Dykes was admitted to a lunatic asylum, Ticehurst House in East Sussex, and died on 22 January 1876, aged 52. Fowler's assertion that he died at St Leonards on Sea, some 18 miles from Ticehurst, may well be correct since Ticehurst House made periodic use of a guest house at St Leonards for holidays for some patients. Fowler's view that Dykes's ill-health was a consequence of overwork, exacerbated by his clash with Bishop Baring, has, however, recently been questioned; one scholar suggests that the medical evidence points to his having succumbed to tertiary syphilis, and speculates that Dykes may have contracted the disease during his undergraduate years.

He is buried in the ‘overflow’ churchyard of St Oswald's, a piece of land for whose acquisition and consecration he had been responsible a few years earlier. He shares a grave with his youngest daughter, Mabel, who died, aged 10, of scarlet fever in 1870. Dykes's grave is now the only marked grave in what, in recent years, has been transformed into a children's playground.

== Works and influence ==
Dykes has been called "perhaps the most significant High Church composer in the Victorian Church of England". This standing was despite his main efforts being as a parish priest in the Tractarian tradition, rather than as a musician. He is best known for over 300 hymn tunes he composed. Of these, many were commissioned from him.

Tractarian leaders of the 1830s, influenced by the Roman Breviary and its medieval hymns in Latin, argued that hymns were just as characteristic of the Catholic tradition as of the evangelical. Up to the middle of the 19th century, words of hymns and the tunes to which they were sung were not necessarily closely identified: the words might be taken from one book, and the tune from another.

=== Composer of hymn tunes ===
Dykes stated that he composed a number of tunes specially for use in Durham Cathedral's Galilee Chapel; but the first of his tunes to have been published appeared in John Grey's Manual of Psalm and Hymn Tunes (Cleaver: London, 1857). This was a hymnal with a local circulation; the Rev. John Grey (1812–1895) was a canon of Durham Cathedral, and brother of the Rev. Francis Richard Grey.

More significant was his speculative submission in 1860 of tunes to the music editor William Henry Monk of a new venture, Hymns Ancient and Modern. They were:

- His first (of three) tunes entitled "Dies Irae" (set to the words Day of wrath O day of mourning, now almost certainly never sung);
- "Hollingside": Jesu, lover of my soul by Charles Wesley, and used also for "Saviour when in dust to Thee" by Robert Grant.;
- "Horbury": Nearer, my God, to Thee;
- "Melita": Eternal Father, strong to save, William Whiting, noted as used "at the funerals of dignitaries and at the launching of ships";
- "Nicaea": Holy, Holy, Holy! Lord God Almighty written by Reginald Heber. The tune is similar to "Trinity" by John Hopkins, in 1850 used likewise for Heber's hymn.;
- "St. Cross" (O come and mourn with me awhile); and
- "St. Cuthbert" (Our blest Redeemer, ere He breathed).

Other tunes which achieved acclaim include:

- "Gerontius" (Praise to the Holiest in the height, taken from Cardinal Newman's poem The Dream of Gerontius, and sung at the funeral of W. E. Gladstone);
- "Lux Benigna": composed for John Henry Newman's poem Lead, Kindly Light, also known as "St Oswald", it was published in 1867 in David Thomas Barry's Psalms and hymns for the church, school, and home;
- "Strength and Stay": O strength and stay, upholding all creation. It was written for the translation of Rerum, Deus, tenax vigor, attributed to Ambrose of Milan, by John Ellerton and Fenton J. A. Hort. The author Dorothy Gurney of the hymn O perfect love, all human thoughts transcending was inspired to write it by Dykes's tune;
- "Dominus Regit Me": The King of Love my shepherd is, the words written by his friend Henry Williams Baker.
- "Pax Dei": Saviour again to Thy dear Name we raise by John Ellerton, a very popular tune (following one by Edward John Hopkins). In 1904 Hymns Ancient & Modern omitted the harmony in the first three bars of "Pax Dei"; lifted from Mendelssohn's Sonntagsmorgen (Op. 77 No. 1).

"St Alban", based on the slow movement of Symphony No. 53 by Haydn, was the original setting for Onward, Christian Soldiers by Sabine Baring-Gould.

The Hymnal published by authority of the General Assembly of the Presbyterian Church of America (1895) contained 43 tunes by Dykes.

=== Other compositions ===
Numerous harmonisations of existing tunes were made by Dykes. They include:

- "Stockton" by Thomas Wright (1763–1829);
- "Wir Pflügen" (We plough the fields, and scatter);
- "Miles Lane" (All hail the power of Jesu’s name), by William Shrubsole; and
- "O Quanta Qualia" (O, what their joy and their glory must be).

Dykes wrote two major anthems — These are they that came out of great tribulation and The Lord is my shepherd — numerous small scale anthems and motets; Communion, Morning and Evening Services; and a setting of the words of the Burial Service. These work are now rarely played. He also wrote a single piece — Andantino — for organ solo.

Dykes also published sermons, book reviews and articles on theology and church music, many of them in the Ecclesiastic and Theologian. These cover the topics of the Apocalypse, the Psalms, Biblical numerology and the function of music and ritual in church services.

In 2017 a plaque commemorating Dykes was installed in the antechapel of St Catharine's College, Cambridge, where he had been an undergraduate in the 1840s.

== Critical views ==
In editing The English Hymnal (1906), Ralph Vaughan Williams "was ruthless in his treatment of Dykes", whose tunes included in the work amounted to six, with some that were popular consigned to an appendix.

Later Dykes's music was condemned for its alleged over-chromaticism (even though some 92% of his hymn tunes are either entirely, or almost entirely diatonic) and for sentimentality. Erik Routley was disparaging, and Kenneth Long in The Music of the English Church (1971) classed as providers of a "glow of spurious religiosity" Dykes with Joseph Barnby, Henry Gauntlett, John Stainer and Arthur Sullivan. More recent views are from Arthur Hutchings, Nicholas Temperley and Jeremy Dibble, seeing Dykes's work in from the baseline of Nahum Tate and Nicholas Brady's New Version of the Psalms published at the end of the 17th century, and its four-square long metre tunes. Hutchings felt that "Victorian sentimentality" as applied to Dykes's tunes would be better described by adjectives such as "stodgy", "dramatic" and "vulgar". According to Dibble:

"A … characteristic element of [Dykes’s] style is his use of imaginative diatonic and chromatic harmony. Dykes was thoroughly aware of the rich reservoir of continental harmonic innovation in the music of Schubert, Mendelssohn, Weber, Spohr, Schumann, Chopin, Liszt and early Wagner and he had absolutely no compunction in using this developed harmonic vocabulary in his tunes both as a colourful expressive tool and as a further means of musical integration."

== Family ==
On 25 July 1850, Dykes married Susannah (1827–1902), daughter of George Kingston, by whom he had three sons and five daughters:

- Ernest Huntington (“Erny”) Dykes (14 August 1851 – 11 October 1924),
- Mary Evelyn Dykes (5 October 1852 – 1921),
- Gertrude Kingston (“Gertie”) Dykes (1854 – 16 December 1942),
- Caroline Sybil (“Carrie”) Dykes (25 February 1856 – 6 April 1943),
- George Lionel Andrew Dykes, 1 November 1857 – February 1858),
- Ethel Susan Dykes (1859 – 21 March 1936),
- Mabel Hey (“Mab”) Dykes (14 May 1860 – 1 September 1870), and
- John Arthur St. Oswald Dykes (27 October 1863 – 31 January 1948).
