= George Huntingdon =

George Huntingdon may refer to:

- George Hastings, 1st Earl of Huntingdon (1488–1544), English peer, close friend of Henry VIII and the husband of the King's mistress, Anne Stafford
- George Hastings, 4th Earl of Huntingdon (1540–1604), English nobleman, grandson of the above
- George Hastings, 8th Earl of Huntingdon, (died 1705), English nobleman, son of the 7th Earl of Huntingdon

== See also ==
- George Huntington (disambiguation)
