= Mark 5 =

- ← chapter 4 chapter 6 →
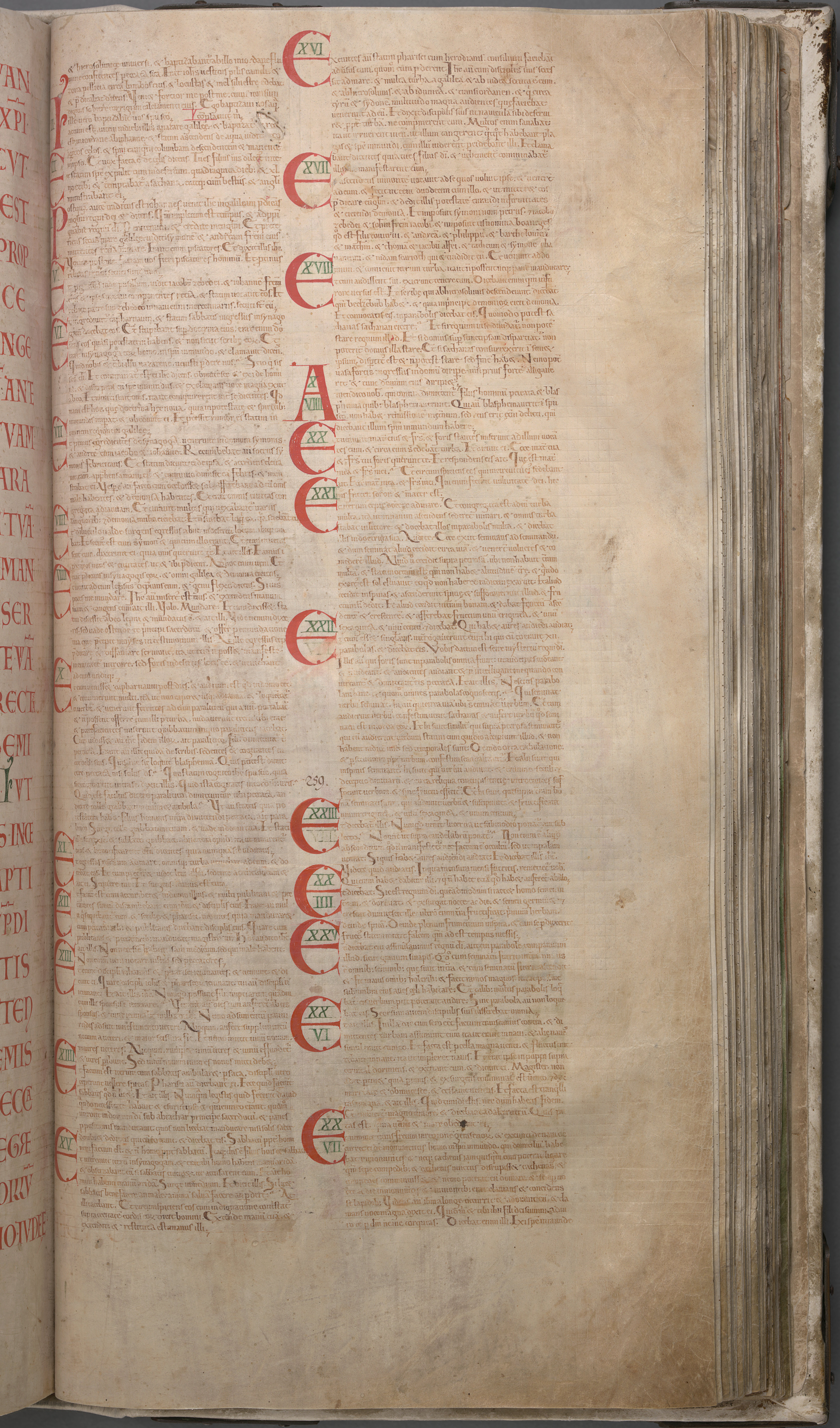
- The Latin text of Mark 1:5–5:8 in Codex Gigas (13th century)
- Book: Gospel of Mark
- Category: Gospel
- Christian Bible part: New Testament
- Order in the Christian part: 2

Mark 5 is the fifth chapter of the Gospel of Mark in the New Testament of the Christian Bible. Taken with the calming of the sea in Mark 4:35–41, there are "four striking works [which] follow each other without a break": an exorcism, a healing, and the raising of Jairus' daughter.

== Text ==
The original text was written in Koine Greek. This chapter is divided into 43 verses.

=== Textual witnesses ===
Some early manuscripts containing the text of this chapter are:

- Codex Vaticanus (325–350; complete)
- Codex Sinaiticus (330–360; complete)
- Codex Bezae (~400; complete)
- Codex Alexandrinus (400–440; complete)
- Codex Ephraemi Rescriptus (~450; complete)

== Healing of the Gerasene demoniac ==
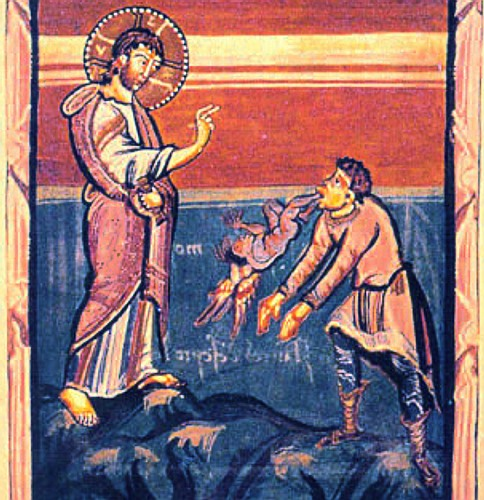
Jesus healing the possessed Gerasene

Jesus and his disciples travel across the Sea of Galilee by boat to the non-Jewish country of the Gerasenes (some manuscripts have "Gadarenes", others "Gergesenes"), a region now in modern-day Jordan. Tom Wright notes that "why Jesus went to that bit of territory we'll never know", although Johann Bengel infers that many Jews dwelt there.

A a man with an unclean spirit, or a possessed, man comes to meet them. (Note: The words ανθρωπος εν πνευματι ακαθαρτω are the same as in Mark 1:23.) Mark relates the story "with a wealth of circumstantial detail": the man had lived among the nearby tombs, and had fought off all attempts to chain him up: the Greek text has a complex string of negatives: οὐδὲ ἁλύσει οὐκέτι οὐδεὶς, oude halysei ouketi oudeis, no one, no longer, not even with chains. He now roamed the tombs and hills screaming.

The man falls at Jesus' feet and begs Jesus not to harm him. Jesus asks him what his name is and he replies "My name is Legion, ... for we are many". Legion may be a reference to the Roman army. They see some nearby pigs and the demons ask if they can be put in the pigs, to which Jesus consents. The pigs, about 2000 of them (only Mark's account estimates the numbers), then rush into the lake and are drowned.

The people tending the pigs run off to town telling everyone what has happened, and some townspeople come to see for themselves. When they arrive the man is sitting dressed and sane. They are disturbed and ask Jesus to leave the area, and he complies. Out of "grateful love", the man asks Jesus to let him be with him (Greek: ινα μετ αυτου η, hina met autou e), translated as "stay with him" in the Jerusalem Bible, but Jesus tells him to go home to his "family" (Amplified Bible) or to his "people" (New International Version) and tell them what God has done for him. The man then travels over the Decapolis telling people the story. Protestant theologian Heinrich Meyer suggests that "he was to abide in his native place as a witness and proclaimer of the marvellous deliverance, that he had experienced from God through Jesus, and in this way to serve the work of Christ".

Anglican biblical scholar Christopher Tuckett argues that "a number of details and inconsistencies within the present narrative suggest that Mark may be combining more than one tradition here into a single story":

- verse 2 has the man "immediately" meet him as Jesus has come out of the boat, whereas verse 6 says that "when he saw Jesus from afar, he ran and worshiped Him"
- verse 8 interrupts a dialogue which otherwise appears to flow from verse 7 to verse 9
- verse 15 seems odd after verse 14, since the latter presupposes a considerable time lapse.

This story also occurs in Matthew 8:28–34, where there are two possessed men, and in Luke 8:26–39. The use of the word "Gadarenes" in some manuscripts may be an attempt to harmonize Mark with Matthew 8:28.

== Jairus' daughter and the woman who touched Jesus' garment ==
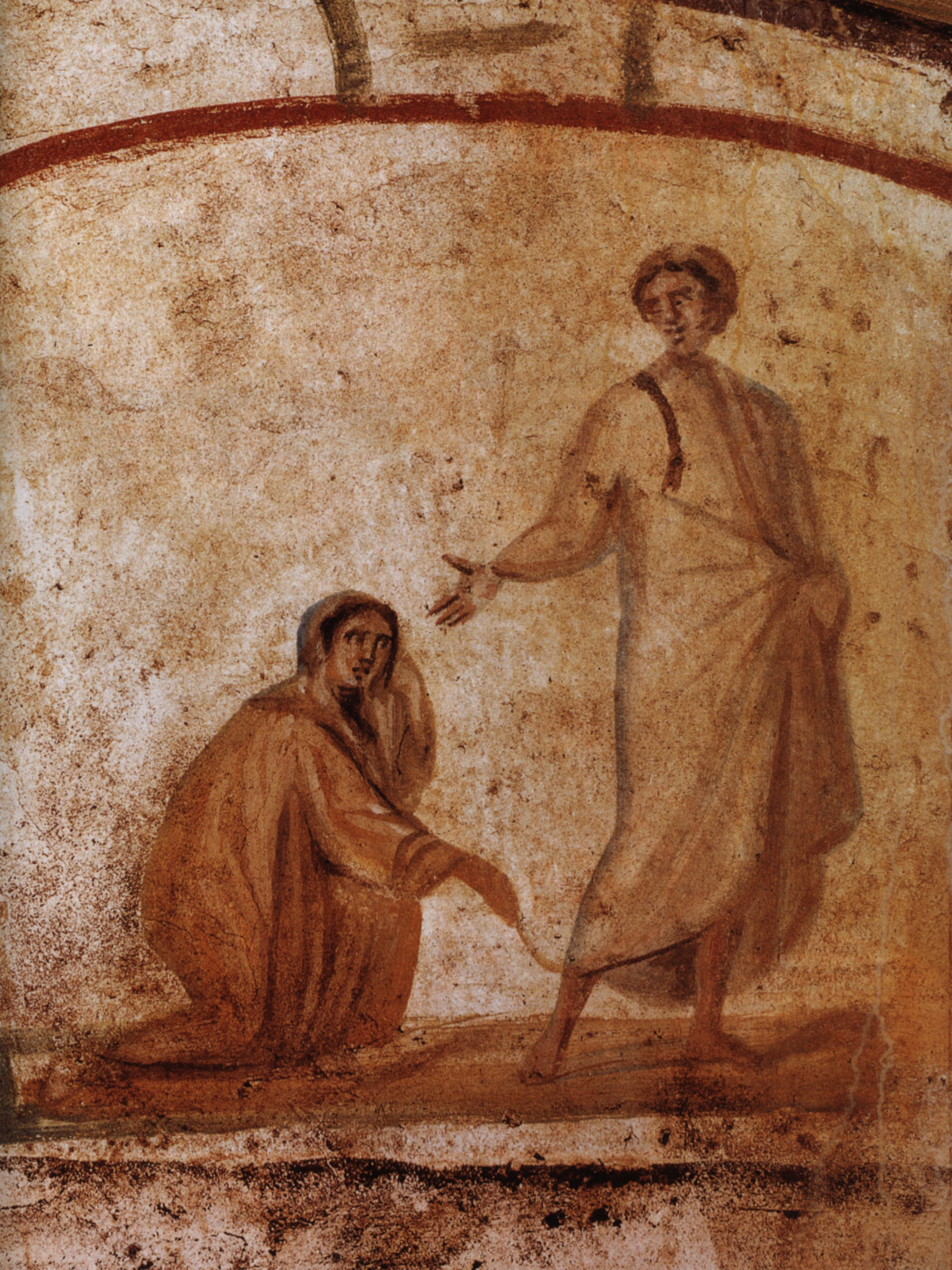
Illustration from the Catacombs of Marcellinus and Peter of Jesus healing the bleeding woman

On the other side of the lake Jesus is met by a man named Jairus, a Synagogue Ruler (a rich patron of the local house of worship), who begs Jesus to heal his sick, twelve-year-old daughter. Jesus takes only Peter, James, and John. This story does not occur in the Gospel of John. On the way there, a woman who suffers from chronic "bleeding", perhaps menorrhagia or bleeding from fibroids. She sneaks up to Jesus and touches his garment, according to Matt 9:20–22 and Luke 8:43–48 (see also Mark 6:53–56, Mark 6#Healing of the sick of Gennesaret) the "fringe of his cloak" (Matt 9:20 – NRSV), by which she is healed. He turns to see who and she fearfully confesses. He says "Daughter, your faith has healed you. Go in peace and be freed from your suffering."

Men arrive and tell Jairus that his daughter is dead. Jesus brushes them off and says "Don't be afraid; just believe." They arrive at the house and everyone is crying loudly. Jesus assures everyone she is not dead, just asleep, goes inside and says to her Talitha kum, telling her to get up, and she does. Unlike his advice about the demon-possessed man, he tells them not to tell people of these events.

This account also appears in the book of Matthew 9:18–26 and Luke 8:40–56. Luke keeps the stories of the possessed man and the two women together, but Matthew inserts the story of the paralyzed man, the calling of Matthew, and the parable of the wineskins found in Mark 2 between these two stories.

== Sources ==
- Brown, Raymond E. et al., The New Jerome Biblical Commentary, Prentice Hall, 1990 ISBN 0-13-614934-0
- Miller, Robert J.-Editor, The Complete Gospels Polebridge Press 1994. ISBN 0-06-065587-9

Preceded by Mark 4	Chapters of the Bible; Gospel of Mark	Succeeded by Mark 6
