= Parable of the Growing Seed =

Parable taught by Jesus of Nazareth according to the Christian Gospel of Mark

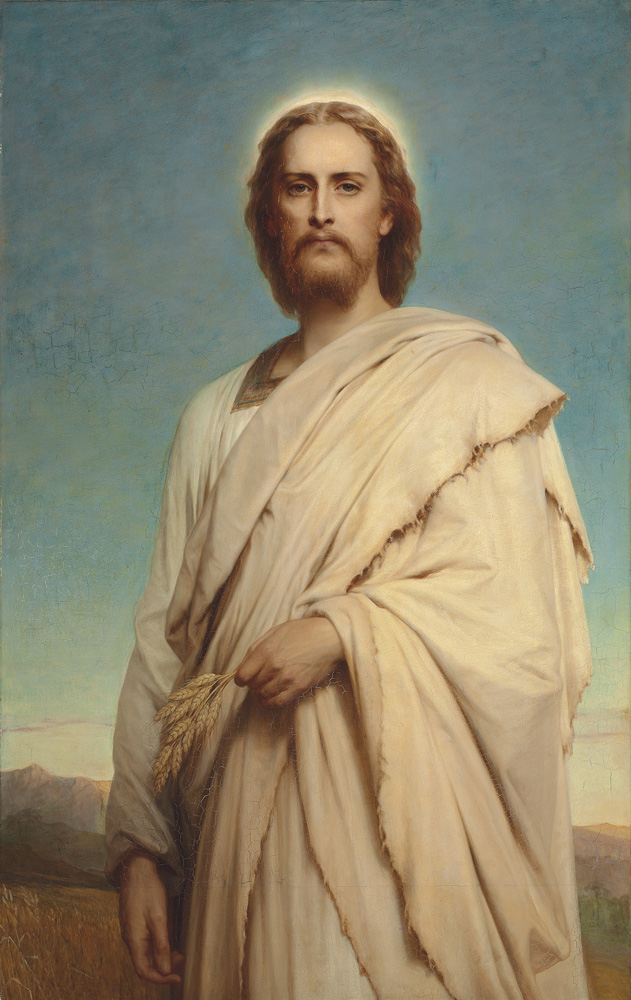
Christ of the Cornfield, Frank Dicksee

The Parable of the Growing Seed (also called the Seed Growing Secretly) is a parable of Jesus which appears only in Mark 4:26–29. It is a parable about growth in the Kingdom of God. It follows the Parable of the Sower and the Lamp under a bushel, and precedes the Parable of the Mustard Seed.

== Narrative ==
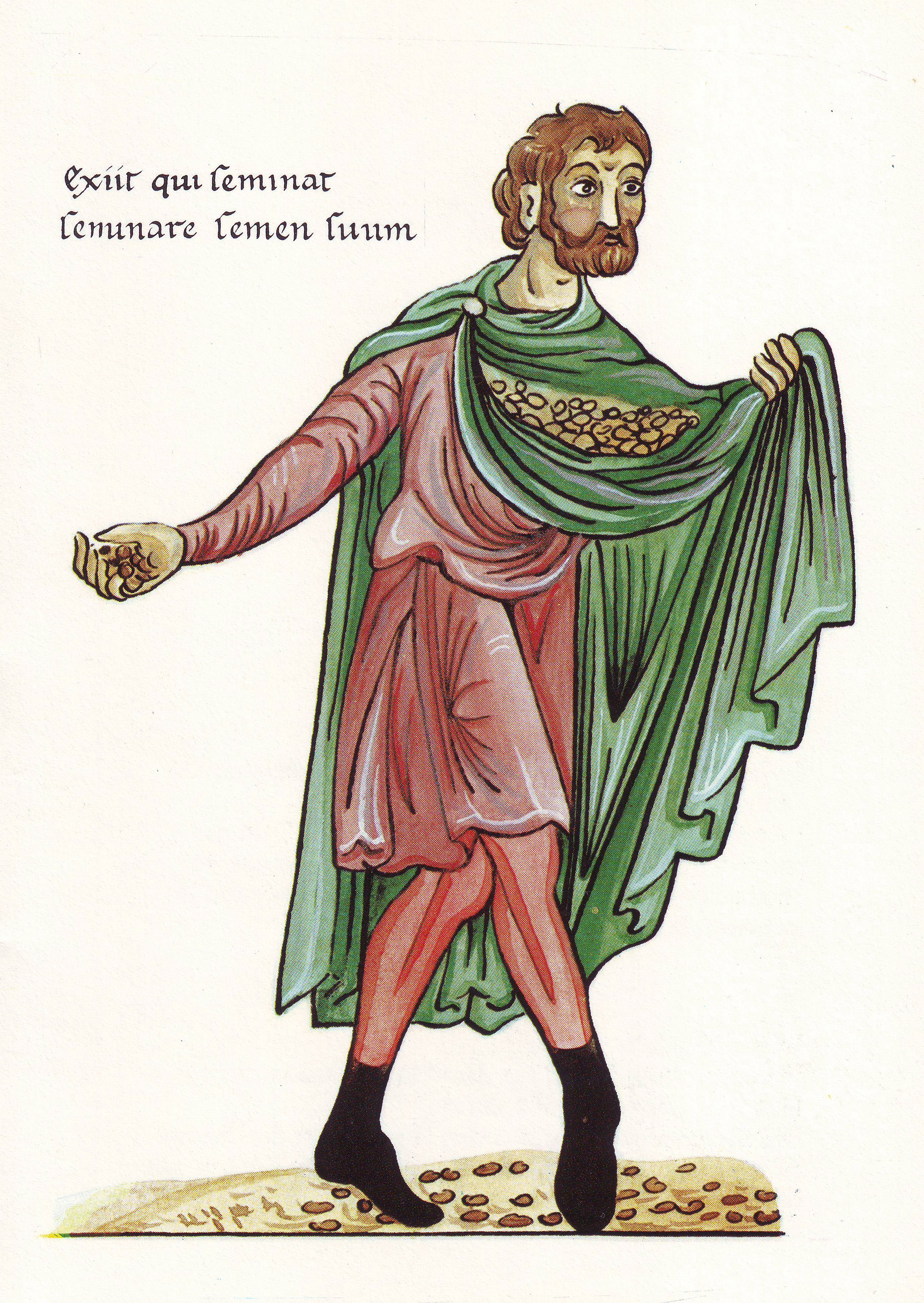
The sower as illustrated in Hortus deliciarum compiled by Herrad of Landsberg at the Hohenburg Abbey in Alsace (12th century)

The parable is as follows:

And he said, "The kingdom of God is as if a man should scatter seed on the ground. He sleeps and rises night and day, and the seed sprouts and grows; he knows not how. The earth produces by itself, first the blade, then the ear, then the full grain in the ear. But when the grain is ripe, at once he puts in the sickle, because the harvest has come."

— Mark 4:26-29, English Standard Version

== Interpretation ==
This parable can be seen as related to the parable of the Sower, although it does not follow that parable immediately. Seventh-day Adventist writer George Knight suggests that it serves as a "correction provided for any ancient or modern disciples who might be feeling discouraged with the amount of fruitless labor they had extended toward those" who failed to hear the message of which the parable of the Sower spoke. Even when the farmer sleeps, the Kingdom of God is still growing. Its growth is due to God, not man, and follows its own timetable.

Paul the Apostle describes the growth of the church in Corinth in a similar way:

I planted the seed, Apollos watered it, but God has been making it grow.

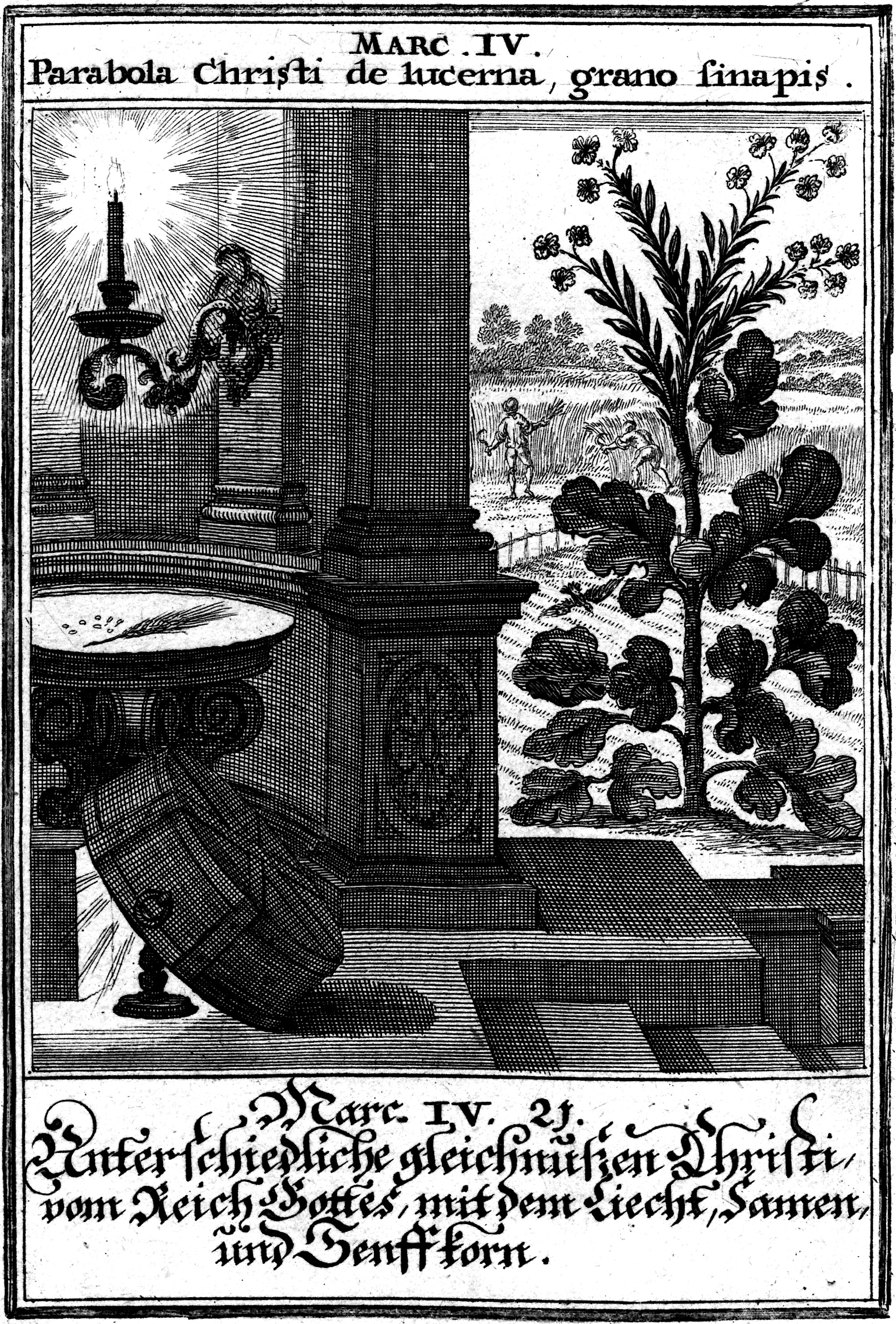
Illustration together with the preceding parable of the lamp under a bushel

Unlike the parable of the Sower, the seed here seems to represent the Kingdom of God itself. Differences in interpretation result from emphasizing different aspects of the parable, such as the seed, the sower, or the earth.

Leonard Goffiné answers the question of "why the word of God is compared to seed," writing, "Because as good fruits spring from good seed, so do good works from the word of God; and as it is impossible for any soil not sown to produce good fruits, so neither can men produce the fruits of the Spirit without the seed of the divine Word."

Roger Baxter in his Meditations writes, "Christ our Lord is both the sower and the seed itself. He intrusts the soil of our souls with His own precious body and blood. He wishes this divine grain to yield a harvest, not of temporal and corruptible, but of eternal and incorruptible, increase. For " he who soweth in the spirit shall reap life everlasting." (Gal. 6:8)

== See also ==
- Life of Jesus in the New Testament
- Ministry of Jesus
- Parable of the Sower
