= George Huntington (priest) =

English high-church Anglican priest (1825–1905)

George Huntington (25 August 1825 – 8 April 1905) was an English high-church Anglican priest who was Rector of Tenby between 1867 and 1905.

== Life ==
Born at Elloughton near Hull, on 25 August 1825, he was youngest of the family of four sons and three daughters of Charles William Huntington of Elloughton by his wife Harriet, daughter of the Rev. William Mantle, curate in charge of Syderstone, Norfolk. He was a cousin of the Rev. John Bacchus Dykes. After education at home he studied from 1846 to 1848 at St. Bees Theological College (closed in 1896). Ordained deacon in 1848 and priest in 1849 by the Bishop of Manchester, he first served as curate at St. Stephen's, Salford. In 1850 he removed to Wigan, where his work among the Lancashire colliers came to the notice of the Earl of Crawford and Balcarres, who made him his domestic chaplain.

After acting as clerk in orders of Manchester Cathedral from 1855 to 1863, and receiving the Lambeth degree of M.A. in 1855, he became rector of St. Stephen's, Salford, in 1863. Huntington was active in Manchester during the cotton famine, and his 'Church's Work in our Large Towns' (1863) gave him a high reputation. On 6 January 1867 he was inducted into the crown rectory of Tenby, in Pembrokeshire, where he remained until his death at Bath on 8 April 1905. He was buried at Tenby.

Huntington was an earnest high churchman, and at first came into conflict with evangelical sentiment in Tenby. A mission conducted there in 1877 by ritualist clergy under Huntington's auspices led to controversy in which William Basil Jones, Bishop of St. David's, took part (cf. Three Letters on the Subject of the Late Tenby Mission 1877). But the hostility gradually disappeared, and Huntington was able to restore and beautify his church, with the active support of his parishioners. He was an impressive preacher, at once practical and somewhat mystical. He was also a governor of the county school, chairman of the managers of the parish schools, and an energetic freemason.

Besides the work mentioned, Huntington published sermons, addresses, articles in magazines, and three volumes exhibiting some power in describing character, viz. 'Autobiography of John Brown, Cordwainer' (1867), of which he represented himself as editor and which went into five editions; the 'Autobiography of an Alms-Bag' (1885) which depicts some local figures, and his 'Random Recollections' (1895) which contains attractive sketches of friends and neighbours.

== Family ==
Huntington married on 26 April 1849 Charlotte Elizabeth, daughter of John Henry Garton of Hull, who survived him. By her he had issue, five daughters and two sons.
