= Parable of the Sower =

Parable taught by Jesus of Nazareth according to Christian gospels

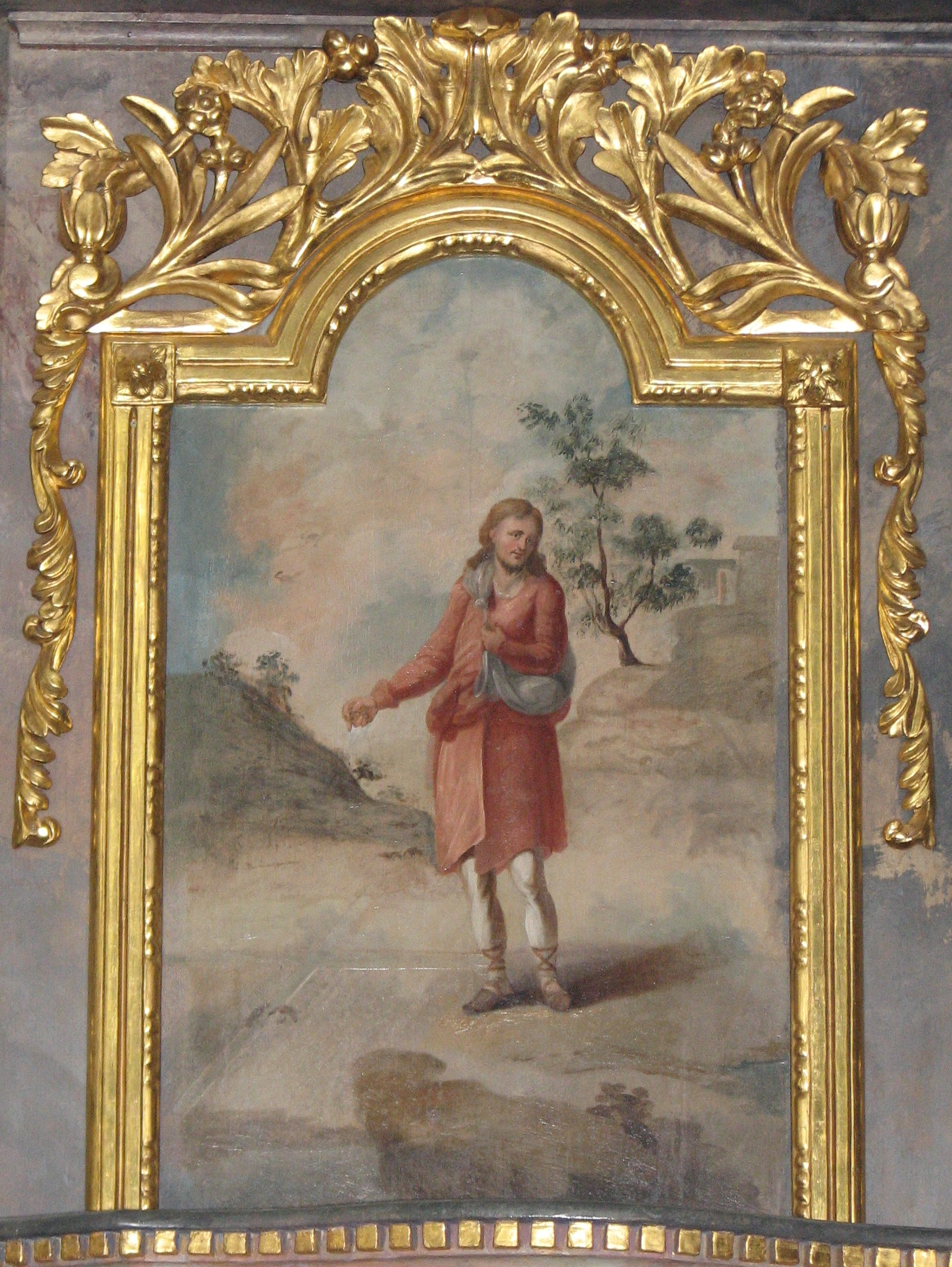
'Sowing the Seed' (Cathedral of Hajdúdorog, Hungary)

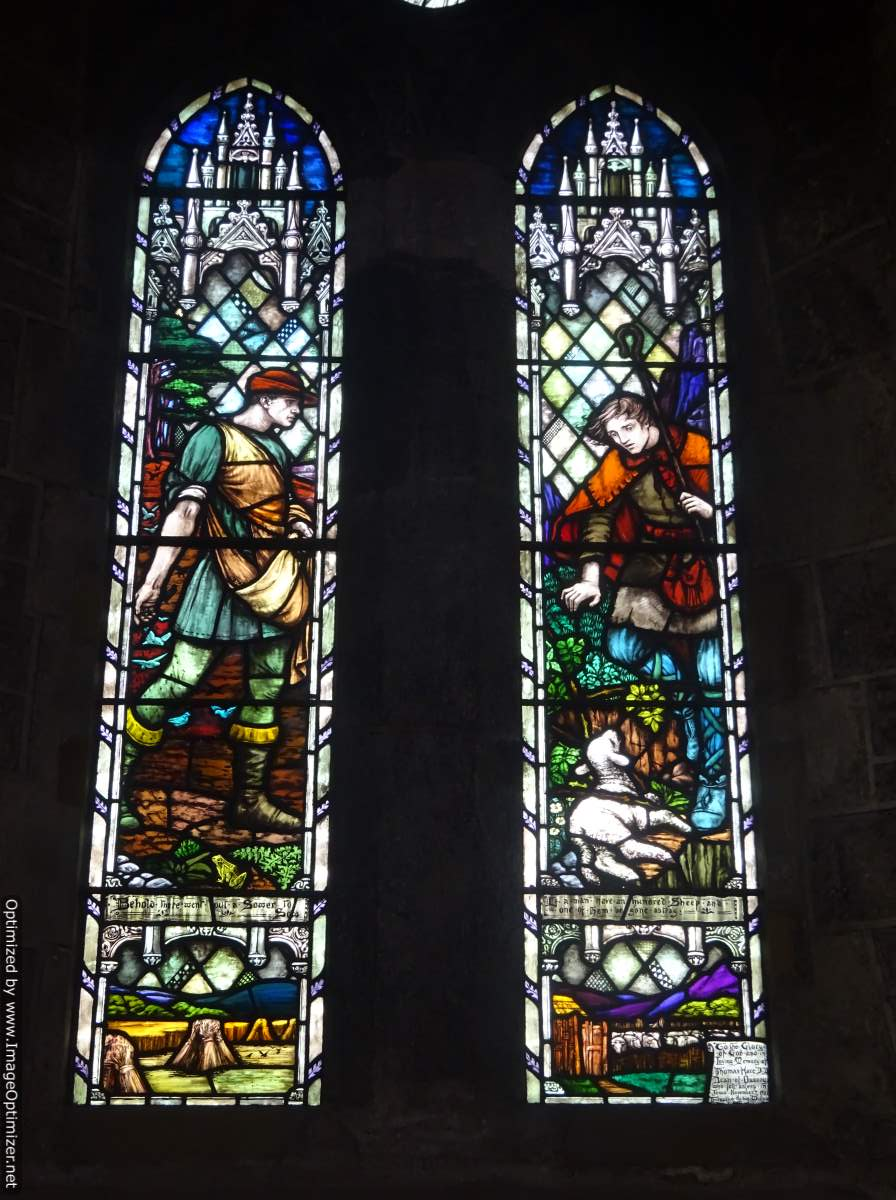
Parable of the Sower (left) in St Mary's Cathedral, Kilkenny, Ireland

The Parable of the Sower (sometimes called the Parable of the Soils) is a parable of Jesus found in Matthew 13 (Matthew 13:1–23), Mark 4 (Mark 4:1–20), Luke 8 (Luke 8:4–15) and the extra-canonical Gospel of Thomas.

Jesus tells of a farmer who sows seed indiscriminately. Some seed falls on the path with no soil, some on rocky ground with little soil, some on soil which contains thorns, and some on good soil. In the first case, the seed is taken away; in the second and third soils, the seed fails to produce a crop; but when it falls on good soil, it grows and yields thirty-, sixty-, or a hundred-fold.

Jesus later explains to his disciples that the seed represents the Gospel, the sower represents anyone who proclaims it, and the various soils represent people's responses to it.

== Text ==
"Listen! Behold, a sower went out to sow. And as he sowed, some seed fell along the path, and the birds came and devoured it. Other seed fell on rocky ground, where it did not have much soil, and immediately it sprang up, since it had no depth of soil. And when the sun rose, it was scorched, and since it had no root, it withered away. Other seed fell among thorns, and the thorns grew up and choked it, and it yielded no grain. And other seeds fell into good soil and produced grain, growing up and increasing and yielding thirtyfold and sixtyfold and a hundredfold." And he said, "He who has ears to hear, let him hear."

— Mark 4:3–9 (ESV)

The explanation given by Jesus.

And when he was alone, those around him with the twelve asked him about the parables. And he said to them, "To you has been given the secret of the kingdom of God, but for those outside everything is in parable, so that
'they may indeed see but not perceive,
and may indeed hear but not understand,
lest they should turn and be forgiven.'"
And he said to them, "Do you not understand this parable? How then will you understand all the parables? The sower sows the word. And
are the ones along the path, where the word is sown: when they hear, Satan immediately comes and takes away the word that is sown in them. And these are the ones sown on rocky ground: the ones who, when they hear the word, immediately receive it with joy. And they have no root in themselves, but endure for a while; then, when tribulation or persecution arises on account of the word, immediately they fall away. And others are the ones sown among thorns. They are those who hear the word, but the cares of the world and the deceitfulness of riches and the desires for other things enter in and choke the word, and it proves unfruitful. But those that were sown on the good soil are the ones who hear the word and accept it and bear fruit, thirtyfold and sixtyfold and a hundredfold."

— Mark 4:10–20 (ESV)

== Context ==
In Mark's Gospel and Matthew's Gospel, this parable, the explanation of the purpose of parables, and the explanation of the parable itself form part of Jesus' third or "Parabolic" discourse, delivered from a boat on the Sea of Galilee. In each narrative, Jesus used the boat as a means of being able to address the huge crowd gathered on the lake shore. Luke's Gospel does not use a boat for the delivery of the sermon, but still has Jesus presenting the parable to a large crowd gathered from 'every city' and follows the parable with a question on the purpose of parables and an explanation of the parable of the sower itself.

While the parable was told to the multitude, the explanations were only given to the disciples.

== Interpretations ==
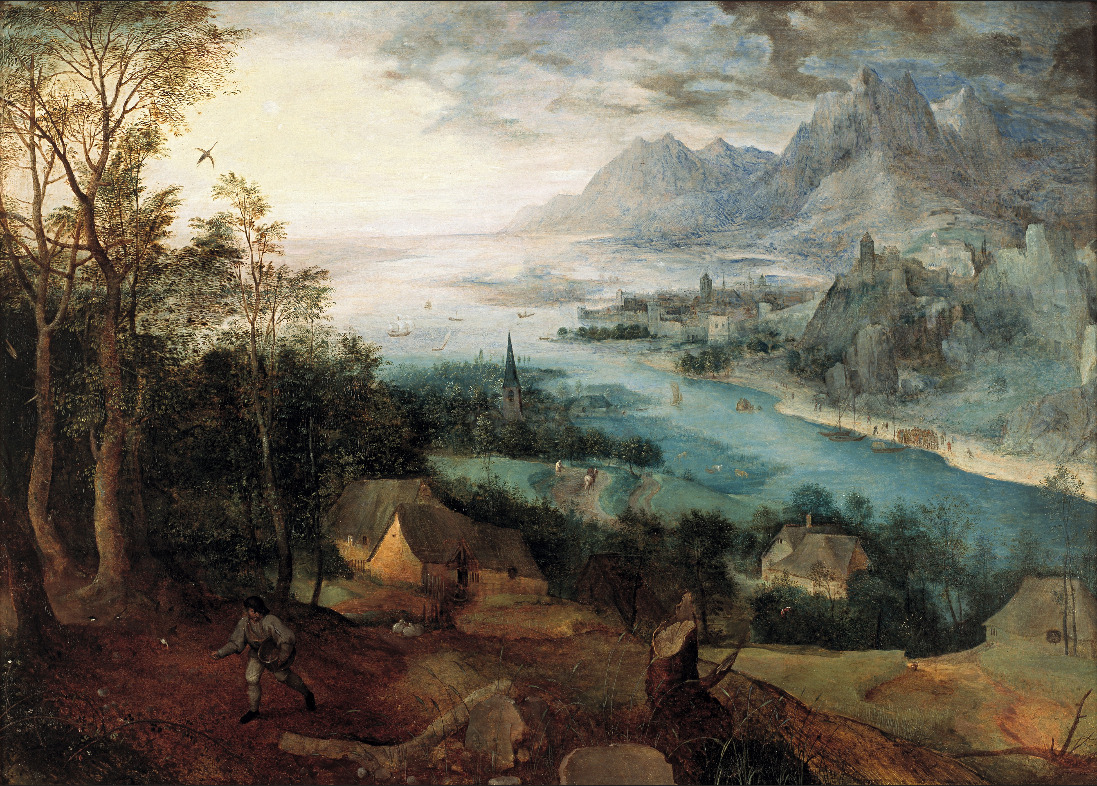
Pieter Bruegel the Elder, Parable of the Sower, 1557.

Jesus says that he teaches in parables because many are opposed to his direct teachings. He quotes Isaiah 6:9–10, who preached to Israel knowing that his message would go unheeded and not understood, with the result that the Israelites' sins would not be forgiven and they would be punished by God for them. This parable seems to be essential for understanding all the rest of Jesus' parables, as it makes clear that what is necessary to understand Jesus is faith in him, and that Jesus will not enlighten those who refuse to believe in him.

The parable recorded in Mark comes just after a description in the previous chapter of a developing hostility toward Jesus and his ministry. The Pharisees accused him of not holding to a strict observance of the Sabbath by performing various healings. Some schools of thought found such actions permissible only if the person treated was in danger of death. Some of the Jerusalem scribes contended that Jesus derived his power from demonic sources.

This is then followed in Mark by the Parable of the Growing Seed and that of Mustard Seed. Together, they indicate that it is not about the individual's response to his message, or even the apparent failure of it to take root, but that "in spite of the opposition of enemies of the Kingdom and in spite of the moral and intellectual failings of the Kingdom’s putative friends, the Kingdom will succeed immensely in the end." Mark uses it to highlight the effect that Christ's previous teachings have had on people, as well as the effect that the Christian message has had on the world over the three decades between Christ's ministry and the writing of the Gospel.

According to Genesis 26:12–13, Isaac sowed seed and "reaped a hundredfold; and the Lord blessed him. The man began to prosper, and continued prospering until he became very prosperous". Anglican bishop Charles Ellicott thought that "the hundredfold return was, perhaps, a somewhat uncommon increase, but the narrative of Isaac’s tillage in Genesis 26:12 shows that it was not unheard of, and had probably helped to make it the standard of a more than usually prosperous harvest"; however, Protestant theologian Heinrich Meyer argued that "such points of detail ... should not be pressed, serving as they do merely to enliven and fill out the picture".

Roger Baxter, in his Meditations, comments on the type of soil, writing, "although this divine seed be in itself most fruitful, it requires, nevertheless, the concurrence of a good soil to produce a harvest. Hence, if it fall on the highway, it will be immediately trampled down; if among thorns, it will be choked up. Examine, then, whether your soul be a proper soil for this seed; whether it be trampled upon continually by distractions and idle thoughts; and whether it be stony and full of the cares and occupations of this life, and consequently not susceptible of the divine influence of heavenly grace."

== Commentary from the Church Fathers ==
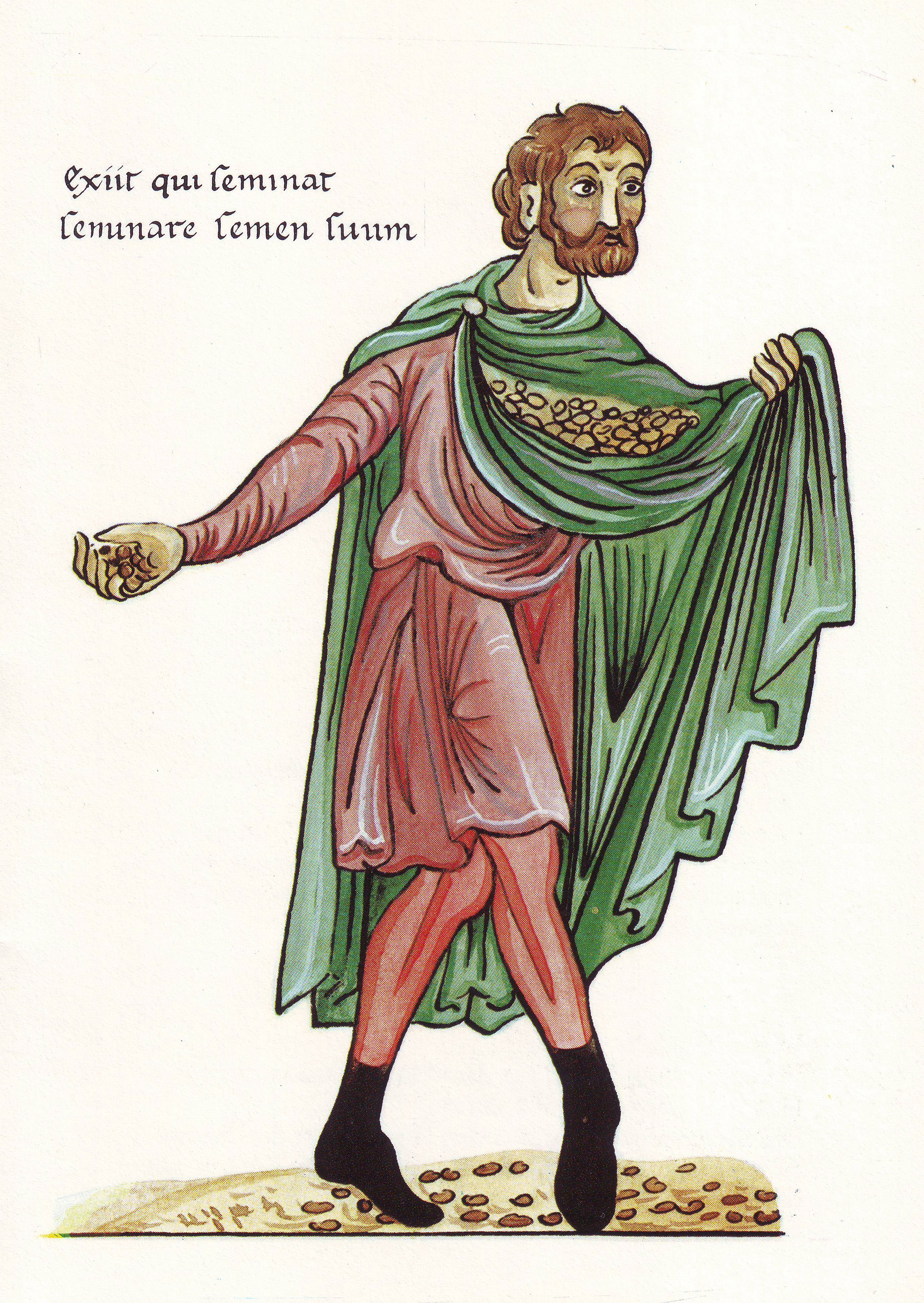
The Sower of good seed, 1180.

Jerome: "By this sower is typified the Son of God, who sows among the people the word of the Father."

Chrysostom: "Whence then went out He who is every where present, and how went He out? Not in place; but by His incarnation being brought nearer to us by the garb of the flesh. Forasmuch as we because of our sins could not enter in unto Him, He therefore came forth to us."

Rabanus Maurus: "Or, He went forth, when having left Judea, He passed by the Apostles to the Gentiles."

Jerome: "Or, He was within while He was yet in the house, and spake sacraments to His disciples. He went therefore forth from the house, that He might sow seed among the multitudes."

Chrysostom: "When you hear the words, the sower went out to sow, do not suppose that is a tautology. For the sower goes out oftentimes for other ends; as, to break up the ground, to pluck up noxious weeds, to root up thorns, or perform any other species of industry, but this man went forth to sow. What then becomes of that seed? three parts of it perish, and one is preserved; but not all in the same manner, but with a certain difference, as it follows, And as he sowed, some fell by the wayside."

Jerome: "This parable Valentinus lays hold of to establish his heresy, bringing in three different natures; the spiritual, the natural or the animal, and the earthly. But there are here four named, one by the wayside, one stony, one thorny, and a fourth the good ground."

Chrysostom: "Next, how is it according to reason to sow seed among thorns, or on stony ground, or by the wayside? Indeed in the material seed and soil of this world it would not be reasonable; for it is impossible that rock should become soil, or that the way should not be the way, or that thorns should not be thorns. But with minds and doctrines it is otherwise; there it is possible that the rock be made rich soil, that the way should be no more trodden upon, and that the thorns should be extirpated. That the most part of the seed then perished, came not of him that sowed, but of the soil that received it, that is the mind. For He that sowed put no difference between rich and poor, wise or foolish, but spoke to all alike."

Jerome: "Note that this is the first parable that has been given with its interpretation, and we must beware where the Lord expounds His own teachings, that we do not presume to understand any thing either more or less, or any way otherwise than as so expounded by Him."

Rabanus Maurus: "But those things which He silently left to our understanding, should be shortly noticed. The wayside is the mind trodden and hardened by the continual passage of evil thoughts; the rock, the hardness of the self-willed mind; the good soil, the gentleness of the obedient mind, the sun, the heat of a raging persecution. The depth of soil, is the honesty of a mind trained by heavenly discipline. But in thus expounding them we should add, that the same things are not always put in one and the same allegorical signification."

Jerome: "And we are excited to the understanding of His words, by the advice which follows, He that hath ears to hear, let him hear."

Saint Remigius: "These ears to hear, are ears of the mind, to understand namely and do those things which are commanded."

== Depictions in the arts ==
- The Tiny Seed, a picture book by Eric Carle published in 1970, is a loose retelling of the parable.
- Parable of the Sower is a science fiction novel, published in 1993, written by Octavia E. Butler.

== See also ==
- Five Discourses of Matthew
- Life of Jesus in the New Testament
- Ministry of Jesus
