= William Whiting (poet) =

English poet and hymnwriter

William Whiting (1 November 1825 – 3 May 1878) was an English writer and hymnist, best known for his 1860 hymn "Eternal Father, Strong to Save".

== Life ==
He was born in Kensington, England, and educated at Clapham and Winchester College. Because of his musical ability, he became master of the Winchester College Chapel Choir's Quiristers.

He died on College Street, Winchester.

== Works ==
Whiting is best known for "Eternal Father, Strong to Save". It is used by the Royal Navy for church services and was adopted by the United States Naval Academy, and so is often called "The Navy Hymn". He also published two poetry collections:

- Rural Thoughts (1851)
- Edgar Thorpe, or the Warfare of Life (1867)

He had hymns published in the 1869 appendix of Psalms and Hymns for Public Worship (SPCK), one in an 1868 appendix to Hymns Ancient and Modern, and hymns in The Hymnary (1872).
