= Roger Baxter =

English Jesuit Catholic missionary to the United States

Roger Baxter (1784–1827) was an English Jesuit who traveled to the United States in 1817 to serve as a Catholic missionary in Maryland, Virginia and Pennsylvania. From 1819 to 1824, he served as Prefect of Studies at the newly founded Georgetown College (now Georgetown University). After a year in Europe in 1825, he left the Society of Jesus but returned to the US and continued to serve missions in the mid-Atlantic. He died in Philadelphia.

== Life ==
Baxter was a native of Walton-le-Dale, near Preston, in Lancashire. He studied at Stonyhurst College. He entered the Society of Jesus in 1810. In 1816, in response to a letter of Rev. T. C. Holland, Baxter wrote a letter printed in the Preston Chronicle in defense of the Trinity.

Baxter arrived in Georgetown in early 1817 bearing a letter of introduction from Charles Plowden, Rector of Stonyhurst and head of the English province of Jesuits, to Giovanni Antonio Grassi, superior of the Jesuits' Maryland mission and the president of Georgetown College. He was ordained shortly after his arrival by Archbishop Neale on 31 May 1817.

Between 9 May and 1 December 1817, a theological controversy was carried on between Baxter and W. H. Wilmer, Episcopal minister of St. Paul's church, Alexandria, Virginia regarding the tenets of Catholicism. Baxter's letters were published in the Alexandria Gazette, and Wilmer's in the Alexandria Herald. Baxter is described as "a man conspicuous for his learning, eloquence, and zeal in defense of the faith".

After occasionally visiting Richmond, Virginia in 1818, Baxter became the resident priest there the following year. Most of the congregation were Irish immigrants who had come to work on the James River and Kanawha Canal. Known as an effective preacher, Baxter gave the address at the dedication of the Cathedral of the Assumption in Baltimore on 31 May 1821.

After October 1819, Baxter served at Georgetown College until 1824, where he was Prefect of Studies and a philosophy professor. Baxter went to Europe for a year. Afterwards he severed ties with the Society and stayed some time in England before returning to the United States.

He continued to serve the missions of Maryland and Pennsylvania, and died at St. Joseph's Residence in Philadelphia on 24 May 1827 at the age of forty-three. He was buried in "The Bishop's Ground". In 1841 his remains were moved to Holy Cross Cemetery.

== Works ==
- "Remarks on a Sermon preached by the Rev. J. Le Mesurier, B.D., in which the invocation of saints and angels, as now practised in the church of Rome, is attempted to be shown as idolatrous", London 1816.
- "The most important Tenets of Roman Catholics fairly explained", Washington, 1819, Philadelphia, 1845, often reprinted.
- Meditations For Every Day In The Year, (Roger Baxter S.J. ed.) New York, Benziger Brothers, 1823.
