= Matthew 10:26 =

- ← 10:25 10:27 →
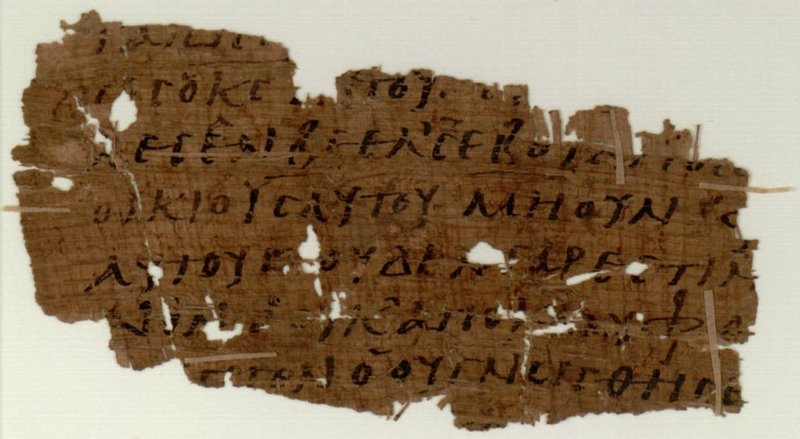
- Matthew 10:25–27 on Papyrus 110 (3rd/4th century), verso side.
- Book: Gospel of Matthew
- Christian Bible part: New Testament

Matthew 10:26 is the 26th verse in the ninth chapter of the Gospel of Matthew in the New Testament.

== Content ==
In the original Greek according to Westcott-Hort for this verse is:

Μὴ οὖν φοβηθῆτε αὐτούς· οὐδὲν γάρ ἐστι κεκαλυμμένον ὃ οὐκ ἀποκαλυφθήσεται, καὶ κρυπτὸν ὃ οὐ γνωσθήσεται.

In the King James Version of the Bible the text reads:

Fear them not therefore: for there is nothing covered, that shall not be revealed; and hid, that shall not be known.

The New International Version translates the passage as:

"So do not be afraid of them. There is nothing concealed that will not be disclosed, or hidden that will not be made known.

== Analysis ==
MacEvilly comments on the latter part of this passage saying it is meant to console the Apostles, and the words may mean that, even though the private virtues of the apostles and their well-intended motives are now be hidden and unknown, in the Day of Judgment, and perhaps even in this life, those hidden virtues will be made known. While by contrast, the hypocrisy and spite of their persecutors will be publicly exposed. Or it may mean that the Gospel which is now regarded by men as hidden and obscure, will be announced and believed all over the earth.

== Commentary from the Church Fathers ==
Saint Remigius: " To the foregoing consolation He adds another no less, saying, Fear ye not them, namely, the persecutors. And why they were not to fear, He adds, For there is nothing hid which shall not be revealed, nothing secret which shall not be known."

Jerome: " How is it then that in the present world, the sins of so many are unknown? It is of the time to come that this is said; the time when God shall judge the hidden things of men, shall enlighten the hidden places of darkness, and shall make manifest the secrets of hearts. The sense is, Fear not the cruelty of the persecutor, or the rage of the blasphemer, for there shall come a day of judgment in which your virtue and their wickedness will be made known."

Hilary of Poitiers: " Therefore neither threatening, nor evil speaking, nor power of their enemies should move them, seeing the judgment-day will disclose how empty, how nought all these were."

Chrysostom: " Otherwise; It might seem that what is here said should be applied generally; but it is by no means intended as a general maxim, but is spoken solely with reference to what had gone before with this meaning; If you are grieved when men revile you, think that in a little time you will be delivered from this evil. They call you indeed impostors, sorcerers, seducers, but have a little patience, and all men shall call you the saviours of the world, when in the course of things you shall be found to have been their benefactors, for men will not judge by their words but by the truth of things."

Saint Remigius: " Some indeed think that these words convey a promise from our Lord to His disciples, that through them all hidden mysteries should be revealed, which lay beneath the veil of the letter of the Law; whence the Apostle speaks, When they have turned to Christ, then the veil shall be taken away. (2 Cor 3:16.) So the sense would be, Ought you to fear your persecutors, when you are thought worthy that by you the hidden mysteries of the Law and the Prophets should be made manifest?"

Preceded by Matthew 10:25	Gospel of Matthew; Chapter 10	Succeeded by Matthew 10:27
