= Matthew 10:27 =

- ← 10:26 10:28 →
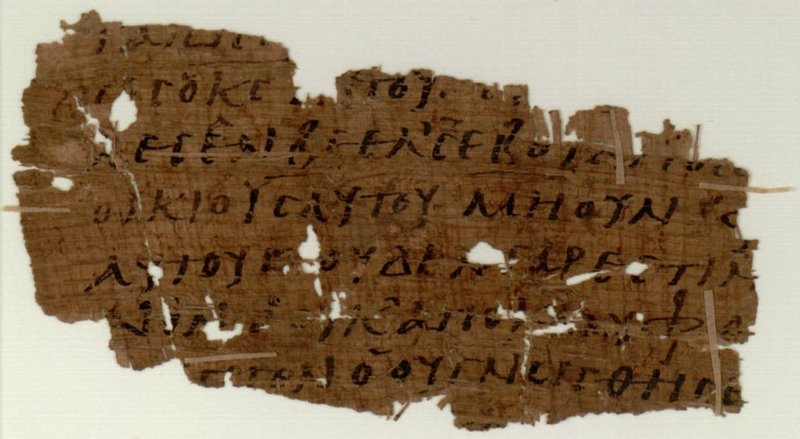
- Matthew 10:25–27 on Papyrus 110 (3rd/4th century), verso side.
- Book: Gospel of Matthew
- Christian Bible part: New Testament

Matthew 10:27 is the 27th verse in the tenth chapter of the Gospel of Matthew in the New Testament.

== Content ==
In the original Greek according to Westcott-Hort, this verse is:

Ὃ λέγω ὑμῖν ἐν τῇ σκοτίᾳ, εἴπατε ἐν τῷ φωτί· καὶ ὃ εἰς τὸ οὖς ἀκούετε, κηρύξατε ἐπὶ τῶν δωμάτων.

In the King James Version of the Bible the text reads:

What I tell you in darkness, that speak ye in light: and what ye hear in the ear, that preach ye upon the housetops.

The New International Version translates the passage as:

What I tell you in the dark, speak in the daylight; what is whispered in your ear, proclaim from the roofs.

== Analysis ==
Since the roofs of the houses in Judea were flat, the apostles could preach from them. According to Lapide, Jesus seems to be saying, "What I say in darkness, i.e., in fear, preach ye in the light, i.e., in the confidence of the truth."

== Commentary from the church fathers ==
Chrysostom: "Then having delivered them from all fear, and set them above all calumny, He follows this up appropriately with commanding that their preaching should be free and unreserved; What I say to you in darkness, that speak ye in the light; what ye hear in the ear, that preach ye upon the housetops."

Jerome: "We do not read that the Lord was wont to discourse to them by night, or to deliver his doctrine in the dark; but He said this because all His discourse is dark to the carnal, and His word night to the unbelieving. What had been spoken by Him they were to deliver again with the confidence of faith and confession."

Saint Remigius: "The meaning therefore is, What I say to you in darkness, that is, among the unbelieving Jews, that speak ye in the light, that is, preach it to the believing; what ye hear in the ear, that is, what I say unto you secretly, that preach ye upon the housetops, that is, openly before all men. It is a common phrase, To speak in one’s ear, that is, to speak to him privately."

Rabanus Maurus: "And what He says, Preach ye upon the housetops, is spoken after the manner of the province of Palestine, where they use to sit upon the roofs of the houses, which are not pointed but flat. That then may be said to be preached upon the housetops which is spoken in the hearing of all men."

Glossa Ordinaria: "Otherwise; What I say unto you while you are yet held under carnal fear, that speak ye in the confidence of truth, after ye shall be enlightened by the Holy Spirit; what you have only heard, that preach by doing the same, being raised above your bodies, which are the dwellings of your souls."

Jerome: "Otherwise; What you hear in mystery, that teach in plainness of speech; what I have taught you in a corner of Judæa, that proclaim boldly in all quarters of the world."

Chrysostom: "As He said, He that believeth on me, the works that I do he shall do also, and greater things than these shall he do; (John 14:12.) so here He shows that He works all things through them more than through Himself; as though He had said, I have made a beginning, but what is beyond, that I will to complete through your means. So that this is not a command but a prediction, showing them that they shall overcome all things."

== See also ==
- Luke 12:3

Preceded by Matthew 10:26	Gospel of Matthew; Chapter 10	Succeeded by Matthew 10:28
