= Matthew 10:13 =

- ← 10:12 10:14 →
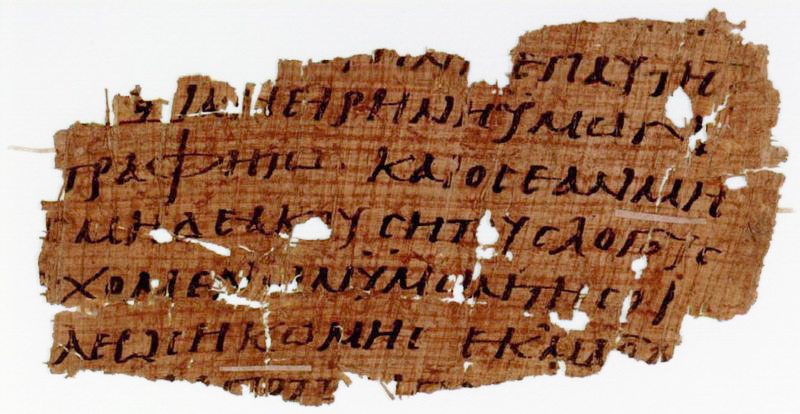
- Matthew 10:13–15 on Papyrus 110 (3rd/4th century), recto side.
- Book: Gospel of Matthew
- Christian Bible part: New Testament

Matthew 10:13 is the thirteenth verse in the tenth chapter of the Gospel of Matthew in the New Testament.

== Content ==
In the original Greek according to Westcott-Hort, this verse is:

Καὶ ἐὰν μὲν ᾖ ἡ οἰκία ἀξία, ἐλθέτω ἡ εἰρήνη ὑμῶν ἐπ᾿ αὐτήν· ἐὰν δὲ μὴ ᾖ ἀξία, ἡ εἰρήνη ὑμῶν πρὸς ὑμᾶς ἐπιστραφήτω.

In the King James Version of the Bible the text reads:

And if the house be worthy, let your peace come upon it: but if it be not worthy, let your peace return to you.

The New International Version translates the passage as:

If the home is deserving, let your peace rest on it; if it is not, let your peace return to you.

== Analysis ==
This is the seventh precept that Jesus gave to his disciples, "that they should pray for peace for their host." If the house is deserving the peace prayed for will come to the house. Lapide notes that peace is personified in this verse, as if the person of peace were rejected by the house and so left, taking the apostles with him. Nevertheless, the passage does not say that the apostles are to pray for peace, but to let their peace rest upon the house. It is still a custom for Jews to greet one another with 'Shalom', a blessing of peace.

Commentator Dale Allison suggests that "your peace" refers to the peace promised "for the eschatological age" (e.g. Isaiah 52:7): How beautiful upon the mountains are the feet of him who brings good news, who proclaims peace. "The gift of peace is not just a social convention: the apostolic greeting should be understood as a sign of the inbreaking of the kingdom."

== Commentary from the Church Fathers ==
Chrysostom: " Also observe that He has not yet endowed them with all gifts; for He has not given them power to discern who is worthy, but bids them seek out; and not only to find out who is worthy, but also not to pass from house to house, saying, And there remain until ye depart out of that city; so they would neither make their entertainer sorrowful, nor themselves incur suspicion of lightness or gluttony."

Ambrose: " (in Luc. 9:5.) The Apostles are not to choose carelessly the house into which they enter, that they may have no cause for changing their lodging; the same caution is not enforced upon the entertainer, lest in choosing his guests, his hospitality should be diminished. When ye enter a house, salute it, saying, Peace be to this house."

Glossa Ordinaria: "As much as to say, Pray ye for peace upon the master of the house, that all resistance to the truth may be pacified."

Jerome: " Here is a latent allusion to the form of salutation in Hebrew and Syriac; they say Salemalach or Salamalach, for the Greek χαῖρε, or Latin Ave; that is, ‘Peace be with you.’ The command then is, that on entering any house they should pray for peace for their host; and, as far as they may be able, to still all discords, so that if any quarrel should arise, they, who had prayed for peace should have it—others should have the discord; as it follows, And if that house be worthy, your peace shall rest upon it; but if it be not worthy, your peace shall return to you again."

Saint Remigius: "Thus either the hearer, being predestined to eternal life, will follow the heavenly word when he hears it; or if there be none who will hear it, the preacher himself shall not be without fruit; for his peace returns to him when he receives of the Lord recompense for all his labour."

Chrysostom: " The Lord instructs them, that though they were teachers, yet they should not look to be first saluted by others; but that they should honour others by first saluting them. And then He shows them that they should give not a salutation only, but a benediction, when He says, If that house be worthy, your peace shall rest upon it."

Saint Remigius: " The Lord therefore taught his disciples to offer peace on their entering into a house, that by means of their salutation their choice might be directed to a worthy house and host. As though He had said, Offer peace to all, they will show themselves either worthy by accepting, or unworthy by not accepting it; for though you have chosen a host that is worthy by the character he bears among his neighbours, yet ought you to salute him, that the preacher may seem rather to enter by invitation, than to intrude himself. This salutation of peace in few words may indeed be referred to the trial of the worthiness of the house or master."

Preceded by Matthew 10:12	Gospel of Matthew; Chapter 10	Succeeded by Matthew 10:14
