= Matthew 10:15 =

- ← 10:14 10:16 →
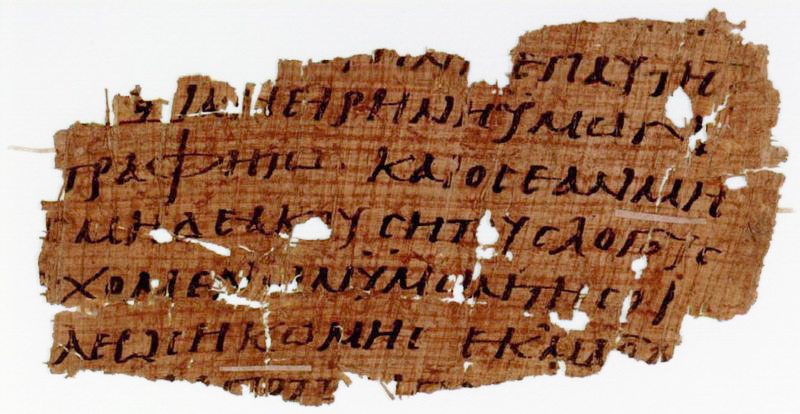
- Matthew 10:13–15 on Papyrus 110 (3rd/4th century), recto side.
- Book: Gospel of Matthew
- Christian Bible part: New Testament

Matthew 10:15 is the fifteenth verse in the tenth chapter of the Gospel of Matthew in the New Testament.

== Content ==
In the original Greek according to Westcott-Hort for this verse is:

Ἀμὴν λέγω ὑμῖν, ἀνεκτότερον ἔσται γῇ Σοδόμων καὶ Γομόρρων ἐν ἡμέρᾳ κρίσεως, ἢ τῇ πόλει ἐκείνῃ.

In the King James Version of the Bible the text reads:

Verily I say unto you, It shall be more tolerable for the land of Sodom and Gomorrha in the day of judgment, than for that city.

The New International Version translates the passage as:

I tell you the truth, it will be more bearable for Sodom and Gomorrah on the day of judgment than for that town.

== Analysis ==
Witham notes the heavy condemnation for the city that rejects the apostles since the Sodomites were destroyed with fire from heaven, which also destroyed the entire region. Lapide points out that Jerome, "proves from this passage that the punishments of the damned are not all equal, nor, by consequence, their faults." He also compares the Sodomites to those who reject the gospel since Lot admonished the people just like the apostles, and in both cases, they were guilty of unseemly behaviour towards guests.

== Commentary from the Church Fathers ==
Jerome: "Because to the men of Sodom and Gomorrah no man had ever preached; but this city had been preached to and had rejected the Gospel."

Saint Remigius: "Or because the men of Sodom and Gomorrah were hospitable among their sensuality, but they had never entertained such strangers as the Apostles."

Jerome: "But if it shall be more tolerable for the land of Sodom than for that city, hence we may learn that there is difference of degree in the punishment of sinners."

Saint Remigius: "Sodom and Gomorrah are especially mentioned, to show that those sins which are against nature are particularly hateful to God, for which the world was drowned with the waters of the deluge, four towns were overthrown, and the world is daily afflicted with manifold evils."

Hilary of Poitiers: "Figuratively, The Lord teaches us not to enter the houses or to mix in the acquaintance of those who persecute Christ, or who are ignorant of Him; and in each town to enquire who among them is worthy, i. e. where there is a Church wherein Christ dwells; and not to pass to another, because this house is worthy, this host is our right host. But there would be many of the Jews who would be so well disposed to the Law, that though they believed in Christ because they admired His works, yet they would abide in the works of the Law; and others again who, desiring to make trial of that liberty which is in Christ, would feign themselves ready to forsake the Law for the Gospel; many also would be drawn aside into heresy by perverse understanding. And since all these would falsely maintain that with them only was Catholic verity, therefore we must with great caution seek out the house, i. e. the Church."

Preceded by Matthew 10:14	Gospel of Matthew; Chapter 10	Succeeded by Matthew 10:16
