= Matthew 10:20 =

- ← 10:19 10:21 →
- Book: Gospel of Matthew
- Christian Bible part: New Testament

Matthew 10:20 is a verse in the tenth chapter of the Gospel of Matthew in the New Testament.

== Content ==
In the original Greek according to Westcott-Hort this verse is:

οὐ γὰρ ὑμεῖς ἐστὲ οἱ λαλοῦντες, ἀλλὰ τὸ πνεῦμα τοῦ πατρὸς ὑμῶν τὸ λαλοῦν ἐν ὑμῖν.

In the King James Version of the Bible the text reads:

For it is not ye that speak, but the Spirit of your Father which speaketh in you.

The New International Version translates the passage as:

for it will not be you speaking, but the Spirit of your Father speaking through you.

== Analysis ==
In Luke 21:15, Jesus also says He will supply them with eloquence. According to MacEvilly the idea is that the apostles would be mere instruments, but Jesus will be the principal-agent. (See Rom 9:16) So while they should do their part, and be diligent, the Holy Spirit will do the rest. From the Old Testament we see this in Num 22:28 when the Angel spoke through the mule, and as the Holy Spirit spoke through Peter in presence of the Jewish leaders. (Acts 4:29)

== Commentary from the Church Fathers ==
Jerome: "When then we are brought before judges for Christ’s sake, we ought to offer only our will for Christ. But Christ who dwelleth in us speaks for Himself, and the grace of the Holy Spirit will minister in our answer."

Hilary of Poitiers: "For our faith, observing all the precepts of the Divine will, will be instructed with an answer according to knowledge, after the example of Abraham, to whom when he had given up Isaac, there was not wanting a ram for a victim. For it is not ye who speak, but the Spirit of your Father that speaketh in you."

Saint Remigius: "Meaning, Ye indeed go out to the battle, but it is I who fight; you utter the words, but it is I who speak. Hence Paul speaks, Seek ye a proof of Christ who speaketh in me? (2 Cor. 13:3.)"

Chrysostom: "Thus He raises them to the dignity of the Prophets, who have spoken by the Spirit of God. He who says here, Take no thought what ye shall speak, (1 Pet. 3:15.) has said in another place, Be ye always ready to give an answer to him that demandeth a reason of the hope that is in you. When it is a dispute among friends, we are commanded to be ready; but before the awful judgment, and the raging people, aid is ministered by Christ, that they may speak boldly and not be dismayed."

Preceded by Matthew 10:19	Gospel of Matthew; Chapter 10	Succeeded by Matthew 10:21
