= Matthew 10:25 =

- ← 10:24 10:26 →
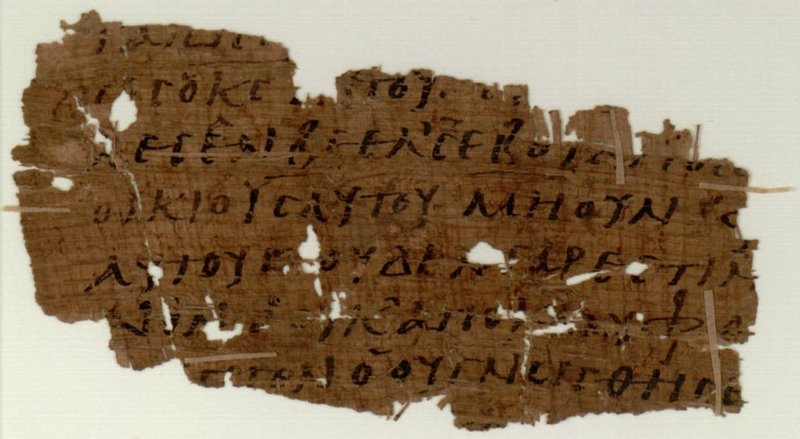
- Matthew 10:25–27 on Papyrus 110 (3rd/4th century), verso side.
- Book: Gospel of Matthew
- Christian Bible part: New Testament

Matthew 10:25 is the 25th verse in the tenth chapter of the Gospel of Matthew in the New Testament.

== Content ==
In the original Greek according to Westcott-Hort for this verse is:

Ἀρκετὸν τῷ μαθητῇ ἵνα γένηται ὡς ὁ διδάσκαλος αὐτοῦ, καὶ ὁ δοῦλος ὡς ὁ κύριος αὐτοῦ. Εἰ τὸν οἰκοδεσπότην Βεελζεβοὺλ ἐκάλεσαν, πόσῳ μᾶλλον τοὺς οἰκιακοὺς αὐτοῦ;

In the King James Version of the Bible the text reads:

It is enough for the disciple that he be as his master, and the servant as his lord. If they have called the master of the house Beelzebub, how much more shall they call them of his household?

The New International Version translates the passage as:

It is enough for the student to be like his teacher, and the servant like his master. If the head of the house has been called Beelzebub, how much more the members of his household!

In Hebrew Gospels Delitzsch Hebrew translation the text reads: It is enough for a disciple to be like his Rav and for a servant to be like his master. If they have called the owner of the house Ba’al Zevul, the same will be for the people of his house.

== Analysis ==
Beelzebub was an idol god of the Ekronites (See 2 Kings 1). The name means the lord of the flies, or having flies, since he was invoked against flies. The Roman god Jupiter had the title of ἀπόμυος, or averter of flies, because of this.

Lapide remarks on Jesus' statement, saying that if Jewish authorities calumniated Him, and called Him Beelzebub, which is to say, a friend of Beelzebub, and He is the head of the family who had proved Himself by so many miracles, "how much more will they dare to do like things to the apostles, the disciples and servants!"

== Commentary from the Church Fathers ==
Glossa Ordinaria: "As much as to say, Be not indignant that ye suffer things, which I also suffer, because I am your lord, who do what I will, and your master, who teach you what I know to be profitable for you."

Saint Remigius: " And because this sentence seemed not to agree with the foregoing words, He shows what they mean by adding, If they have called the master of the house Beelzebub, how much more they of his household?"

Chrysostom: " He said not here ‘slaves,’ but those of his household, to show how dear they were to Him; as elsewhere He said, I will not call you slaves, but my friends. (John 15:15.)"

Saint Remigius: " As much as to say, Ye therefore will not seek worldly honours and human glory, while you see me pursuing the redemption of mankind through mocking and contumely."

Chrysostom: " And He says not only, If they have reviled the master of the house, but expresses the very words of railing, for they had called Him Beelzebub."

Jerome: " Beelzebub is the idol of Accaron who is called in the book of Kings, the God of flies; ‘Bel,’ signifying idol; (2 Kings 1:3.) ‘zebub,’ a fly. The Prince of the dæmons He calls by the name of the foulest of idols, which is so-called because of the uncleanness of the fly, which destroys the sweetness of ointment."

| Preceded by Matthew 10:24 | Gospel of Matthew; Chapter 10 | Succeeded by Matthew 10:26 |
