= Matthew 10:23 =

- ← 10:22 10:24 →
- Book: Gospel of Matthew
- Christian Bible part: New Testament

Matthew 10:23 is a verse in the tenth chapter of the Gospel of Matthew in the New Testament.

== Content ==
In the original Greek according to Westcott-Hort for this verse is:

Ὅταν δὲ διώκωσιν ὑμᾶς ἐν τῇ πόλει ταύτῃ, φεύγετε εἰς τὴν ἄλλην· ἀμὴν γὰρ λέγω ὑμῖν, οὐ μὴ τελέσητε τὰς πόλεις τοῦ Ἰσραήλ, ἕως ἂν ἔλθῃ ὁ υἱὸς τοῦ ἀνθρώπου.

The New International Version translates the passage as:

When you are persecuted in one place, flee to another. I tell you the truth, you will not finish going through the cities of Israel before the Son of Man comes.

== Analysis ==
Bede states that this fleeing was not to be on account of fear but rather to scatter the seed of their doctrine. Athanasius was known to have taken flight numerous times to evade capture by the Arian sect. This stand in contrast to Tertullian who states that to take flight is unlawful.

The final saying "before the Son of Man comes," is interpreted in a number of different ways, which Lapide summarizes as, 1) after the apostles finish preaching they will return to Jesus, 2) you will not finish preaching among the Jews before Jesus' resurrection, after which they will be sent to the Gentiles, 3) you will not, by travelling and preaching, make perfect the faith of the Gospel among the people of Israel, before the second advent of the Son of Man.

== Commentary from the Church Fathers ==
Chrysostom: "Having foretold the fearful things which should come upon them after His Cross, resurrection, and ascension, He leads them to gentler prospects; He does not bid them presumptuously to offer themselves for persecution, but to fly from it; When they persecute you in this city, flee ye to another. For because this was the first beginning of their conversion, He adapts His words to their state."

Jerome: " This must be referred to the time when the Apostles were sent to preach, when it was said to them, Go not into the way of the Gentiles; they should not fear, but may shun persecution. This we see the believers did in the beginning, when on a persecution arising in Jerusalem they were scattered throughout all Judea, and thus the season of tribulation was made the seedtime of the Gospel."

Augustine: "Not that the Saviour was unable to protect His disciples, does He here bid them fly, and Himself give them an example of it, but He instructed man’s weakness, that he should not presume to tempt God, when he has any thing that he can do for himself, but should shun all evils."

Augustine: "He might have suffered them to lay violent hands upon themselves, that they might not fall into the hands of their persecutors. Therefore if He neither commanded nor allowed this mode of departure from this world to His own, for whom He Himself had promised that He would prepare an eternal mansion; whatever instances may be brought by the Gentiles who know not God, it is clear that this is not lawful for those who believe one true God."

Chrysostom: " But that they should not say, What then if we fly from persecution, and again they cast us out thence whither we have fled? To remove this fear, He says, Verily I say unto you, ye shall not have completed, &c. that is, ye shall not have made the circuit of Palestine and return to Me, before I shall take you to Me."

Rabanus Maurus: " Or; He foretels that they shall not have brought all the cities of Israel to the faith by their preaching, before the Lord’s resurrection be accomplished, and a commission given them to preach the Gospel throughout the world."

Hilary of Poitiers: " Otherwise; He exhorts to fly from place to place; for His preaching driven from Judæa, first passed into Greece; then, wearied with divers sufferings of the Apostles up and down the cities of Greece, it takes an abiding refuge in the rest of the Gentile world. But to show that the Gentiles would believe the preaching of the Apostles, but that the remnant of Israel should only believe at His second coming, He adds, Ye shall not have completed the cities of Israel; i. e. After the fulness of the Gentiles is brought in, that which remains of Israel to fill up the number of the Saints shall be called into the Church in Christ’s future coming to glory."

Augustine: "Let the servants of Christ then do as He commanded, or permitted them; as He fled into Egypt, let them fly from city to city, whenever any one of them is marked out for persecution; that the Church be not deserted, it will be filled by those who are not so sought after; and let these give sustenance to their fellow-servants whom they know cannot live by any other means. But when the threatening danger is common to all, Bishops, clergy, and laity, let not those who have need of aid be deserted by those whose aid they require. Either therefore let them all pass to some stronghold, or let those who are obliged to remain, not be deserted by those whose province it is to supply their ecclesiastical needs; that they may either all live, or all suffer whatever their Master will have them to suffer."

Saint Remigius: " Be it known moreover, that as this precept respecting endurance under persecution specially belongs to the Apostles and their successors, men of fortitude, so the permission to fly is sufficiently proper for the weak in the faith, to whom the tender Master condescends, lest if they should offer themselves for martyrdom, under the pain they should deny the faith; and the sin of flight is lighter than that of denial. But though by their flight they showed that they had not the constancy of perfect faith, yet their desert was great, seeing they were ready to leave all for Christ. So that if He had not given them permission to fly, some would have said that they were aliens from the glory of the heavenly kingdom."

Jerome: " Spiritually we may say; When they shall persecute you in one book or one passage of Scripture, let us flee to other volumes, for however contentious the adversary may be, protection will come from the Saviour before the victory is yielded to the enemy."

Preceded by Matthew 10:22	Gospel of Matthew; Chapter 10	Succeeded by Matthew 10:24
