= Matthew 10:16 =

- ← 10:15 10:17 →
- Book: Gospel of Matthew
- Christian Bible part: New Testament

Matthew 10:16 is a verse in the tenth chapter of the Gospel of Matthew in the New Testament.

== Content ==
In the original Greek according to Westcott-Hort for this verse is:

Ἰδού, ἐγὼ ἀποστέλλω ὑμᾶς ὡς πρόβατα ἐν μέσῳ λύκων· γίνεσθε οὖν φρόνιμοι ὡς οἱ ὄφεις, καὶ ἀκέραιοι ὡς αἱ περιστεραί.

In the King James Version of the Bible the text reads:

Behold, I send you forth as sheep in the midst of wolves: be ye therefore wise as serpents, and harmless as doves.

The New International Version translates the passage as:

I am sending you out like sheep among wolves. Therefore be as shrewd as snakes and as innocent as doves.

== Analysis ==
Lapide notes that the wolves are usually interpreted as either the Scribes and Pharisees, or any enemies and persecutors. This is said to show the power of Christ since in this way innumerable wolves are overcome by very few sheep (the twelve apostles), which are the most defenceless of all animals. St. Jerome comments that by being wise the apostles are to avoid snares, and by being harmlessness and simple they are not to do evil.

The Greek word for harmless ἀκέραιοι, which St. Basil says comes from ἀ (not), and κεράννυμι (to mix), i.e. to be unmixed, that is, pure, sincere, being someone who expresses with their mouths what they think in their hearts.

== Commentary from the Church Fathers ==
Chrysostom: "Having removed all care and anxiety from the Apostles, and armed them with the miraculous powers, He proceeds to foretell the evils which should befall them. First, that they might know his knowledge of the future; secondly, that they should not think that these things befel them because of the want of power in their Master; thirdly, that they might not be amazed if these things had come upon them unexpectedly; fourthly, that after hearing these things, they might not be dismayed in the season of His cross; and lastly, that they might learn a new method of warfare. He sends them unprovided, bidding them look to those who should receive them for support; but rests not in that, but shows his power still further, Lo, I send you as sheep in the midst of wolves. Where observe that He does not say merely ‘to wolves,’ but in the midst of wolves, to show His excellent might therein, that the sheep would overcome the wolves though they were in the midst of them; and though they received many bites from them, yet were they not destroyed, but rather convert them. And it is a much greater and a more wonderful power that can change their hearts than that can kill them. Among wolves He teaches them to show the meekness of sheep."

Gregory the Great: "For he who undertakes the office of preacher ought not to do evil, but to suffer it, and by his meekness to mollify the wrath of the angry, and by his wounds to heal the wounds of sinners in their affliction. And even should the zeal of right-doing ever require that He should be severe to those that are placed under Him, His very severity will be of love and not of cruelty, outwardly maintaining the rights of discipline, and inwardly loving those whom He corrects. Too many, when they are entrusted with the reins of government, burn to make the subjects feel them, display the terrors of authority, and forgetting that they are fathers, rather desire to be thought lords, changing a station of lowliness into that of lofty dominion, if they ever seem outwardly to fawn on any one, they inwardly hate him; of such He spoke above; They come to you in sheep’s clothing, but inwardly they are ravening wolves. (Mat. 7:15.) For prevention whereof we ought to consider that we are sent as sheep among wolves, whose innocence we ought to preserve, not having the tooth of malice."

Jerome: " He calls the Scribes and Pharisees who are the clergy of the Jews, wolves."

Hilary of Poitiers: " The wolves indeed are all such as should pursue the Apostles with mad fury."

Chrysostom: " Their consolation under their hardships was the excellent power of Him who sent them; wherefore He puts that before all, Lo, I send you. Be not dismayed, though you be sent into the midst of wolves; for I am able to bring it to pass that you suffer no hurt, and that ye should not only prevail over the wolves, but be made more terrible than lions. But it is good that it should be thus; hereby your virtue is made brighter, and My power is more manifested. Also that somewhat should proceed from themselves, that they should not think themselves to be crowned without reason, He adds, Be ye therefore wise as serpents, simple as doves."

Jerome: " Wise, that they might escape snares; simple, that they might not do evil to others. The craft of the serpent is set before them as an example, for he hides his head with all the rest of his body, that he may protect the part in which life is. So ought we to expose our whole body, that we may guard our head which is Christ; that is, that we study to keep the faith whole and uncorrupt."

Rabanus Maurus: " The serpent moreover seeks out narrow chinks through which it crawls to draw off its old skin; so the preacher passing through the narrow way lays aside the old man."

Saint Remigius: " Beautifully the Lord bids the preacher have the wisdom of the serpent; because the first man was beguiled by a serpent; as though He had said, The foe is subtle to deceive, be ye therefore wise to rescue; he commended the tree, do ye also commend the tree of the Cross."

Hilary of Poitiers: " He first attempted the softer sex, allured her by hope, and promised a share of immortality. Do you in like manner seize every opportunity, look well into each man’s nature and inclination, use wisdom of speech, reveal hope of good things to come; that what he promised falsely we may preach truly according to God’s promise, that they that believe shall be like to the Angels."

Chrysostom: " But as we ought to have the wisdom of the serpent, that we should not be hurt in any deadly part, so also we should have the simplicity of the dove, not to retaliate when we are hurt, nor to avenge ourselves on those who have designed aught against us."

Saint Remigius: " The Lord unites these two things; because simplicity without wisdom might be easily deceived, and wisdom is dangerous unless it be tempered with simplicity that does no man hurt."

Jerome: " The harmlessness of doves is shown by the assumption of that form by the Holy Spirit; as the Apostle speaks, In malice be ye children."

Chrysostom: " What is harder than these commands? It is not enough that we suffer ill, but we must not be angry thereat, as is the dove’s nature, for anger is extinguished not by anger, but by meekness."

Rabanus Maurus: " That by the wolves above He intended men, He shows when He adds, Take heed of men."

| Preceded by Matthew 10:15 | Gospel of Matthew; Chapter 10 | Succeeded by Matthew 10:17 |
