= Matthew 10:24 =

- ← 10:23 10:25 →
- Book: Gospel of Matthew
- Christian Bible part: New Testament

Matthew 10:24 is a verse in the tenth chapter of the Gospel of Matthew in the New Testament.

== Content ==
In the original Greek according to Westcott-Hort this verse is:

Οὐκ ἔστι μαθητὴς ὑπὲρ τὸν διδάσκαλον, οὐδὲ δοῦλος ὑπὲρ τὸν κύριον αὐτοῦ.

In the King James Version of the Bible the text reads:

The disciple is not above his master, nor the servant above his lord.

The New International Version translates the passage as:

"A student is not above his teacher, nor a servant above his master.

== Analysis ==
John MacEvilly points out that with this verse Christ encourages His disciples to endure persecutions, with His own example. And as disciples and servants, the apostles were not "to seek for greater honour and applause than the Master has."

== Commentary from the Church Fathers ==
Chrysostom: " Because it should come to pass that His disciples among their other persecutions should suffer loss of character, which to many is the most grievous of all calamities, He consoles them from His own example, and those things that were spoken of Him; a comfort to which no other can be compared."

Hilary of Poitiers: " For the Lord, the Light eternal, the Captain of the faithful, the Parent of immortality, set before His disciples this solace of the sufferings that should come upon them, that we should embrace it as our glory when we are made like to our Lord in suffering; whence He says, The disciple is not above his master, nor the slave above his lord."

Chrysostom: "Understand, so long as he is a disciple or servant, he is not above his master or lord by the nature of honour. And do not here object to me such cases as rarely happen, but receive this according to the common course of things."

Saint Remigius: " He calls Himself master and lord; by disciple and servant He denotes His Apostles."

Preceded by Matthew 10:23	Gospel of Matthew; Chapter 10	Succeeded by Matthew 10:25
