= Matthew 10:28 =

- ← 10:27 10:29 →
- Book: Gospel of Matthew
- Christian Bible part: New Testament

Matthew 10:28 is a verse in the ninth chapter of the Gospel of Matthew in the New Testament.

== Content ==
In the original Greek according to Westcott-Hort this verse is:

Καὶ μὴ φοβηθῆτε ἀπὸ τῶν ἀποκτεινόντων τὸ σῶμα, τὴν δὲ ψυχὴν μὴ δυναμένων ἀποκτεῖναι· φοβήθητε δὲ μᾶλλον τὸν δυνάμενον καὶ ψυχὴν καὶ σῶμα ἀπολέσαι ἐν γεέννῃ.

In the King James Version of the Bible the text reads:

And fear not them which kill the body, but are not able to kill the soul: but rather fear him which is able to destroy both soul and body in hell.

The New International Version translates the passage as:

Do not be afraid of those who kill the body but cannot kill the soul. Rather, be afraid of the one who can destroy both soul and body in hell.

== Analysis ==
It is pointed out by Robert Witham and others that people, in general, are afraid of prison, "but they are not afraid of hell fire. Most people fear temporal punishments, but do not think twice of the torments of eternal fire," that never dies (cf. Isaiah 66:24. This follows up the previous verses where Jesus bids his disciples not to fear calumnies, and here not even to fear death.

== Commentary from the Church Fathers ==
Hilary of Poitiers: " Therefore they ought to inculcate constantly the knowledge of God, and the profound secret of evangelic doctrine, to be revealed by the light of preaching; having no fear of those who have power only over the body, but cannot reach the soul; Fear not those that kill the body, but cannot kill the soul."

Chrysostom: " Observe how He sets them above all others, encouraging them to set at nought cares, reproaches, perils, yea even the most terrible of all things, death itself, in comparison of the fear of God. But rather fear him, who can destroy both soul and body in hell."

Jerome: " This word is not found in the Old Scriptures, but it is first used by the Saviour. Let us enquire then into its origin. We read in more than one place that the idol Baal was near Jerusalem, at the foot of Mount Moriah, by which the brook Siloc flows. This valley and a small level plain was watered and woody, a delightful spot, and a grove in it was consecrated to the idol. To so great folly and madness had the people of Israel come, that, forsaking the neighbourhood of the Temple, they offered their sacrifices there, and concealing an austere ritual under a voluptuous life, they burned their sons in honour of a dæmon. This place was called Gehennom, that is, The valley of the children of Hinnom. These things are fully described in Kings and Chronicles, and the Prophet Jeremiah. (2 Kings 23:10. 2 Chron. 28:3. Jer. 7:32; 32:35.) God threatens that He will fill the place with the carcases of the dead, that it be no more called Tophet and Baal, but Polyandrion, i. e. The tomb of the dead. Hence the torments and eternal pains with which sinners shall be punished are signified by this word."

Augustine: "This cannot be before the soul is so joined to the body, that nothing may sever them. Yet it is rightly called the death of the soul, because it does not live of God; and the death of the body, because though man does not cease to feel, yet because this his feeling has neither pleasure, nor health, but is a pain and a punishment, it is better named death than life."

Chrysostom: " Note also, that He does not hold out to them deliverance from death, but encourages them to despise it; which is a much greater thing than to be rescued from death; also this discourse aids in fixing in their minds the doctrine of immortality."

Preceded by Matthew 10:27	Gospel of Matthew; Chapter 10	Succeeded by Matthew 10:29
