= Matthew 10:14 =

- ← 10:13 10:15 →
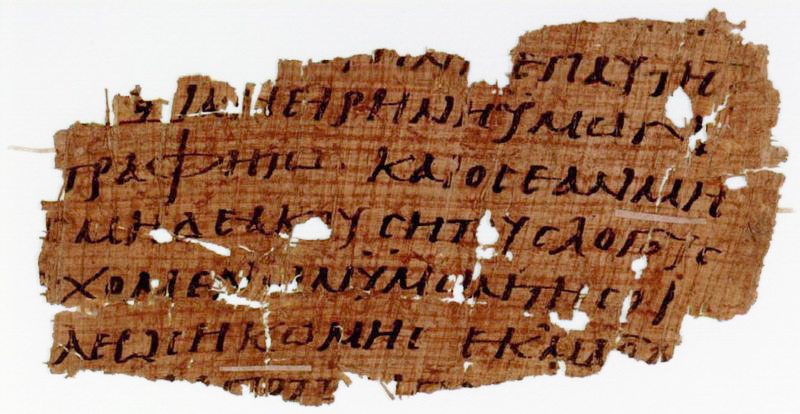
- Matthew 10:13–15 on Papyrus 110 (3rd/4th century), recto side.
- Book: Gospel of Matthew
- Christian Bible part: New Testament

Matthew 10:14 is the fourteenth verse in the tenth chapter of the Gospel of Matthew in the New Testament.

== Content ==
In the original Greek according to Westcott-Hort, this verse is:

Καὶ ὃς ἐὰν μὴ δέξηται ὑμᾶς μηδὲ ἀκούσῃ τοὺς λόγους ὑμῶν, ἐξερχόμενοι τῆς οἰκίας ἢ τῆς πόλεως ἐκείνης, ἐκτινάξατε τὸν κονιορτὸν τῶν ποδῶν ὑμῶν.

In the King James Version of the Bible the text reads:

And whosoever shall not receive you, nor hear your words, when ye depart out of that house or city, shake off the dust of your feet.

The New International Version translates the passage as:

If anyone will not welcome you or listen to your words, shake the dust off your feet when you leave that home or town.

== Analysis ==
Both Luke and Mark add, "for a testimony against them". Lapide puts forth three possible reasons for shaking off of the dust: 1) To show their labour in reaching the city, and yet that "it had profited them nothing." 2) To declare even the dust, as impious, because of the unworthy inhabitants, and so "signifying a curse on them", wanting nothing to do with them. 3) As a witness "for the day of judgment against their unbelief and wickedness."

== Commentary from the Church Fathers ==
Hilary of Poitiers: "The Apostles salute the house with the prayer of peace; yet so as that peace seems rather spoken than given. For their own peace which was the bowels of their pity ought not to rest upon the house if it were not worthy; then the sacrament of heavenly peace could be kept within the Apostles own bosom. Upon such as rejected the precepts of the heavenly kingdom an eternal curse is left by the departure of the Apostles, and the dust shaken from their feet; And whosoever shall not receive you, nor hear your words, when ye go out of that house, or that town, cast the dust off your feet. For he that lives in any place seems to have a kind of fellowship with that place. By the casting the dust off the feet therefore all that belonged to that house is left behind, and nothing of healing or soundness is borrowed from the footsteps of the Apostles having trod their soil."

Rabanus Maurus: "Otherwise; The feet of the disciples signify the labour and progress of preaching. The dust which covers them is the lightness of earthly thoughts, from which even the greatest doctors cannot be free; their anxiety for their hearers involves them in cares for their prosperity, and in passing through the ways of this world, they gather the dust of the earth they tread upon. They then who have despised the teaching of these doctors, turn upon themselves all the toils and dangers and anxieties of the Apostles as a witness to their damnation. And lest it should seem a slight thing not to receive the Apostles, He adds, Verily I say unto you, it shall be more tolerable for Sodom and Gomorrah in the day of judgment, than for that city."

Jerome: "Also they shake off the dust as a testimony of the Apostles’ toil, that in preaching the Gospel they had come even so far, or as a token that from those that rejected the Gospel they would accept nothing, not even the necessaries of life."

== See also ==
- Unique readings in Papyrus 110

Preceded by Matthew 10:13	Gospel of Matthew; Chapter 10	Succeeded by Matthew 10:15
