= Wer bis an das Ende beharrt =

1847 motet by Felix Mendelssohn

- Motet by Felix Mendelssohn
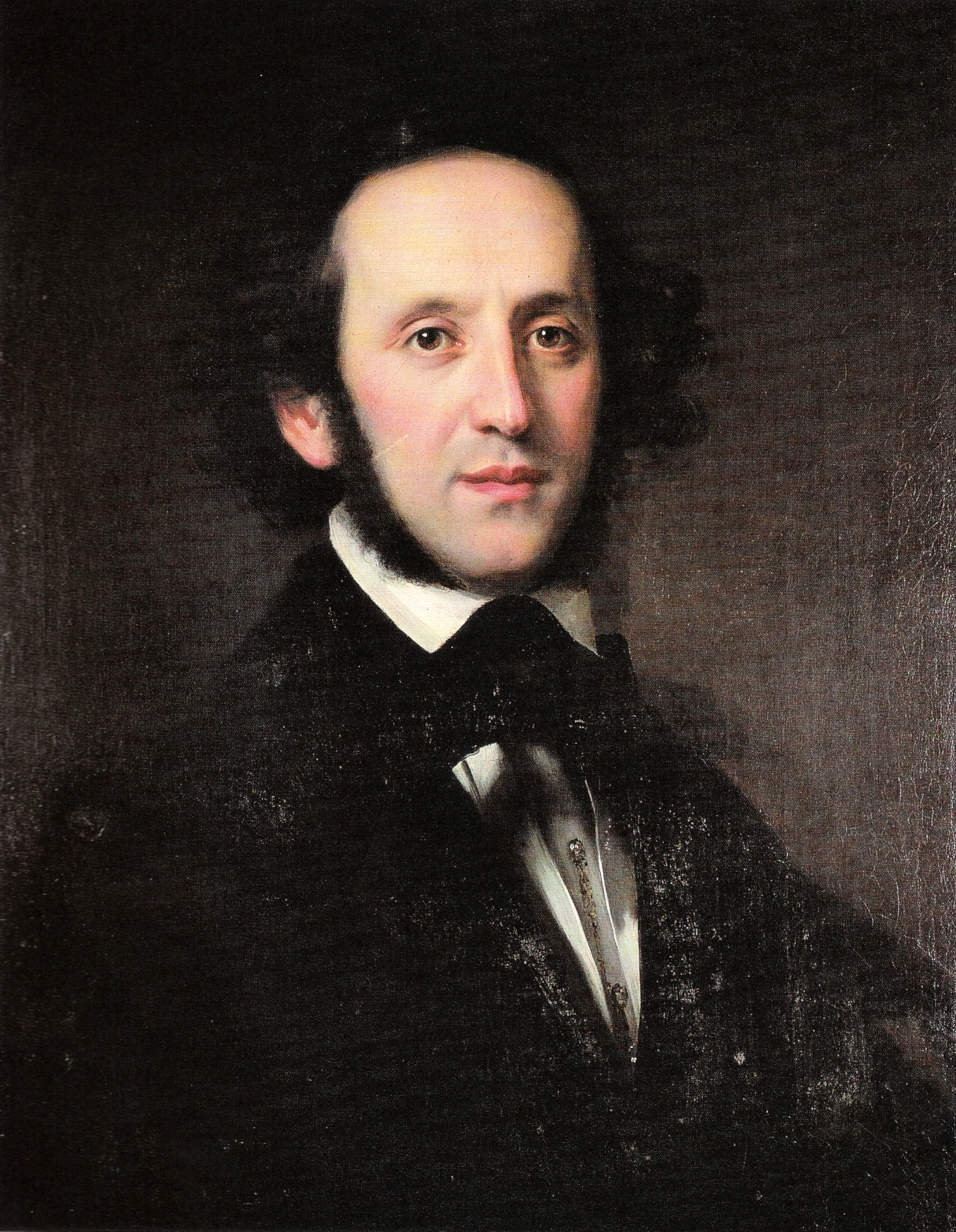
- The composer in 1846, portrait by Eduard Magnus
- English: He that shall endure to the end
- Key: F major
- Text: Matthew 10:22
- Language: German / English
- Published: 1847
- Scoring: SATB four-part choir; orchestra

Wer bis an das Ende beharrt (He that shall endure to the end), is a motet for a four-part choir by Felix Mendelssohn. He wrote it as part of his oratorio Elijah, published in 1847.

== History ==
Mendelssohn composed the motet with orchestral accompaniment as part of his oratorio Elijah, as movement 32, published in 1847. It was published in a critical edition by Carus-Verlag.

== Text and music ==
In the oratorio, the motet is placed like a chorale as a point of rest and reflection. Elijah is in the desert and has given up, reviewing his mission as a failure, but an angel requests him to arise. The text of the motet occurs twice in the Gospel of Matthew, in Matthew 10:22 and Matthew 24:13. Mendelssohn used the translation by Martin Luther. The English translation is from the King James Version of the Bible.

German

Wer bis an das Ende beharrt,
der wird selig.

English

He that shall endure to the end,
shall be saved.

The music is in one movement in F major and common time, marked Andante sostenuto. The instruments play colla parte with the voices. It has been described as "delicate".
