= Matthew 10:29 =

- ← 10:28 10:30 →
- Book: Gospel of Matthew
- Christian Bible part: New Testament

Matthew 10:29 is a verse in the tenth chapter of the Gospel of Matthew in the New Testament.

== Content ==
In the original Greek according to Westcott-Hort for this verse is:

Οὐχὶ δύο στρουθία ἀσσαρίου πωλεῖται; Καὶ ἓν ἐξ αὐτῶν οὐ πεσεῖται ἐπὶ τὴν γῆν ἄνευ τοῦ πατρὸς ὑμῶν·

In the King James Version of the Bible the text reads:

Are not two sparrows sold for a farthing? and one of them shall not fall on the ground without your Father.

The New International Version translates the passage as:

Are not two sparrows sold for a penny? Yet not one of them will fall to the ground apart from the will of your Father.

== Analysis ==
An "ἀσσαρίου" is a diminutive according to Lapide and of very small value. He also notes that birds are normally in the air flying and when they perish they fall to the ground.

== Commentary from the Church Fathers ==
Chrysostom: " Having set aside fear of death, that the Apostles should not think that if they were put to death they were deserted by God, He passes to discourse of God’s providence, saying, Are not two sparrows sold for a farthing, and one of them does not fall to the ground without your Father?"

Jerome: " If these little creations fall not without God’s superintendence and providence, and if things made to perish, perish not without God’s will, you who are immortal ought not to fear that you live without His providence."

Jerome: " This expresses still more clearly the sense as it was above explained, that they should not fear those who can kill the body, for if the least animal falls not without God’s knowledge, how much less a man who is dignified with the Apostolic rank?"

Hilary of Poitiers: " Figuratively; That which is sold is our soul and body, and that to which it is sold, is sin. They then who sell two sparrows for a farthing, are they who sell themselves for the smallest sin, born for flight, and for reaching heaven with spiritual wings. (vid. Ps. 124:7.) Caught by the bait of present pleasures, and sold to the enjoyment of the world, they barter away their whole selves in such a market. It is of the will of God that one of them rather soar aloft; but the law proceeding according to God’s appointment decrees that one of them should fall. In like manner as, if they soared aloft they would become one spiritual body; so, when sold under sin, the soul gathers earthly matter from the pollution of vice, and there is made of them one body which is committed to earth."

Preceded by Matthew 10:28	Gospel of Matthew; Chapter 10	Succeeded by Matthew 10:30
