= Matthew 10:21 =

- ← 10:20 10:22 →
- Book: Gospel of Matthew
- Christian Bible part: New Testament

Matthew 10:21 is a verse in the tenth chapter of the Gospel of Matthew in the New Testament.

== Content ==
In the original Greek according to Westcott-Hort this verse reads:

Παραδώσει δὲ ἀδελφὸς ἀδελφὸν εἰς θάνατον, καὶ πατὴρ τέκνον· καὶ ἐπαναστήσονται τέκνα ἐπὶ γονεῖς, καὶ θανατώσουσιν αὐτούς.

In the King James Version of the Bible the text reads:

And the brother shall deliver up the brother to death, and the father the child: and the children shall rise up against their parents, and cause them to be put to death.

The New International Version translates the passage as:

"Brother will betray brother to death, and a father his child; children will rebel against their parents and have them put to death.

== Analysis ==
This prophecy of family strife is based upon Micah 7:6, which was thought to describe the discord of the latter days. The conviction that the great tribulation would turn those of the same household against one another was widespread.

Bede comments on why Jesus foretold their coming persecution saying, "He foretold the future trouble, in order that being known beforehand, they might more easily bear it." Hilary of Poitiers adds, "For the darts which are seen coming are less likely to strike." There are a number of stories of saints that were put to death by their family members, including Saint Barbara who was killed by her father for her faith. However such activity was never recorded among the disciples.

== Commentary from the Church Fathers ==
Glossa Ordinaria: "Having placed the comfort first, He adds the more alarming perils; Brother shall deliver up brother to death, and the father the son; children shall rise against parents, to put them to death."

Gregory the Great: "Wrongs which we suffer from strangers, pain us less than those we suffer from men on whose affections we had counted; for besides the bodily affliction, there is then the pain of lost affection."

Jerome: "This we see often happen in persecutions, nor is there any true affection between those whose faith is different."

Preceded by Matthew 10:20	Gospel of Matthew; Chapter 10	Succeeded by Matthew 10:22
