= Matthew 10:18 =

- ← 10:17 10:19 →
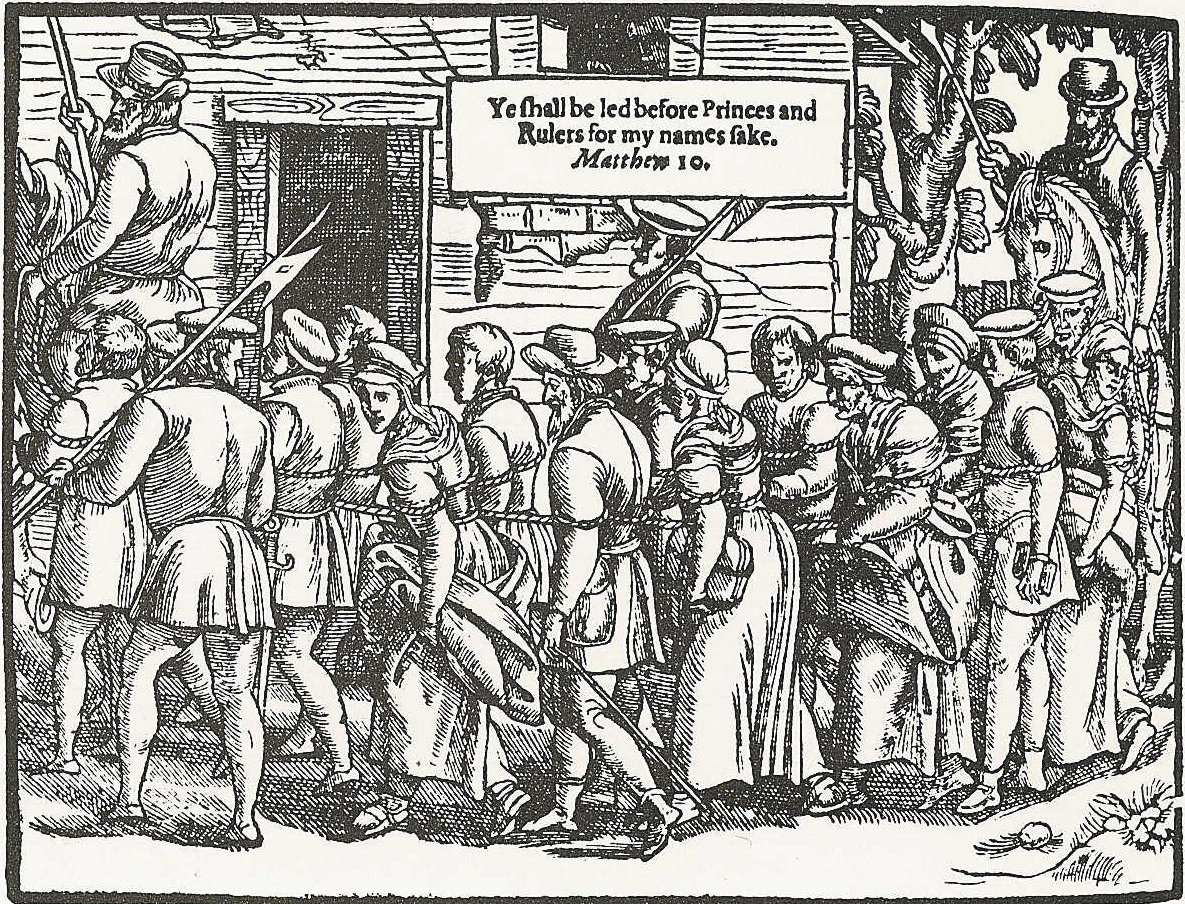
- Peasants bound by ropes and being taken to London for trial. The inscription says "You will be led before Princes and Rulers for my names sake. Matthew 10". John Foxe's Book of Martyrs (1563).
- Book: Gospel of Matthew
- Christian Bible part: New Testament

Matthew 10:18 is the 18th verse in the ninth chapter of the Gospel of Matthew in the New Testament.

== Content ==
In the original Greek according to Westcott-Hort for this verse is:

καὶ ἐπὶ ἡγεμόνας δὲ καὶ βασιλεῖς ἀχθήσεσθε ἕνεκεν ἐμοῦ, εἰς μαρτύριον αὐτοῖς καὶ τοῖς ἔθνεσιν.

In the King James Version of the Bible the text reads:

And ye shall be brought before governors and kings for my sake, for a testimony against them and the Gentiles.

The New International Version translates the passage as:

On my account you will be brought before governors and kings as witnesses to them and to the Gentiles.

== New Testament References ==
Matthew 27:2

== Analysis ==
The Bible and church tradition both relate how this did indeed happen, although after Jesus' ascension. The following cases are well documented: 1) Paul was led as a captive before Felix and Festus, governors of Judea; 2) James the Less was led before Ananias, the High Priest, by whom he was ordered to be slain; 3) Peter and James the Great before Agrippa, who beheaded James; 4) Peter and Paul were brought to Nero who had them both killed; 5) St. Andrew was led to Ægeus, the pro-consul of Achaia, who crucified him; 6) St. John was brought before the Emperor Domitian, who had him placed in a cask of boiling oil, although he is said not to have died.

== Commentary from the Church Fathers ==
Glossa Ordinaria: "Ye have indeed need to be wise as serpents, for, as they are wont to do, they will deliver you to councils, forbidding you to preach in My name; then if ye be not corrected, they will scourge you, and at length ye shall be brought before kings and governors."

Hilary of Poitiers: " Who will endeavour to extort from you either to be silent or to temporize."

Chrysostom: " How wonderful that men who had never been beyond the lake in which they fished, did not straightway depart from Him on hearing these things. It was not only of their goodness, but of the wisdom of their Teacher. For to each evil He attaches somewhat of alleviation; as here He adds, for my sake; for it is no light consolation to suffer for Christ’s sake, for they did not suffer as evil or wrong doers. Again He adds, for a testimony against them."

Gregory the Great: "Either that they had persecuted to the death, or that they had seen and were not changed. For the death of the saints is to the good an aid, to the bad a testimony; that thus the wicked may perish without excuse in that from which the elect take example and live."

Chrysostom: " This was matter of consolation to them, not that they sought the punishment of others, but that they were confident that in all things they had One present with them, and all-knowing."

Hilary of Poitiers: " And by this their testimony not only was all excuse of ignorance of His divinity taken away from their persecutors, but also to the Gentiles was opened the way of believing on Christ, who was thus devotedly preached by the voices of the confessors among the flames of persecution; and this is that He adds, and the Gentiles."

Preceded by Matthew 10:17	Gospel of Matthew; Chapter 10	Succeeded by Matthew 10:19
