= Matthew 10:30 =

- ← 10:29 10:31 →
- Book: Gospel of Matthew
- Christian Bible part: New Testament

Matthew 10:30 is a verse in the ninth chapter of the Gospel of Matthew in the New Testament.

== Content ==
According to Westcott-Hort, the verse in its original Greek is:

ὑμῶν δὲ καὶ αἱ τρίχες τῆς κεφαλῆς πᾶσαι ἠριθμημέναι εἰσί.

In the King James Version of the Bible, the text reads:

But the very hairs of your head are all numbered.

The New International Version translates the passage as:

And even the very hairs of your head are all numbered.

== Analysis ==
Lapide says in a symbolic sense, "the hairs of Christ are all the elect and those who shall be saved, for these adorn Christ as hair does the head." He goes on to say that "the hairs are all the thoughts, words, and deeds of the faithful."

== Commentary from the Church Fathers ==
Jerome: " That He says, The hairs of your head are all numbered, shows the boundless providence of God towards man, and a care unspeakable that nothing of ours is hid from God."

Hilary of Poitiers: " For when any thing is numbered it is carefully watched over."

Chrysostom: " Not that God reckons our hairs, but to show His diligent knowledge, and great carefulness over us."

Jerome: " Those who deny the resurrection of the flesh ridicule the sense of the Church on this place, as if we affirmed that every hair that has ever been cut off by the razor rises again, when the Saviour says, Every hair of your head—not is saved, but—is numbered. Where there is number, knowledge of that number is implied, but not preservation of the same hairs."

Augustine: "Though we may fairly enquire concerning our hair, whether all that has ever been shorn from us will return; for who would not dread such disfigurement. When it is once understood that nothing of our body shall be lost, so as that the form and perfectness of all the parts should be preserved, we at the same time understand that all that would have disfigured our body is to be united or taken up by the whole mass, not affixed to particular parts so as to destroy the frame of the limbs; just as a vessel made of clay, and again reduced to clay, is once more reformed into a vessel, it needs not that that portion of clay which had formed the handle should again form it, or that which had composed the bottom, should again go to the bottom, so long as the whole was remoulded into the whole, the whole clay into the whole vessel, no part being lost. Wherefore if the hair so often shorn away would be a deformity if restored to the place it had been taken from, it will not be restored to that place, but all the materials of the old body will be revived in the new, whatever place they may occupy so as to preserve the mutual fitness of parts. Though what is said in Luke, Not a hair of your head shall fall to the ground, (Luke 21:18.) may be taken of the number, not the length of the hairs, as here also it is said, The hairs of your head are all numbered."

Preceded by Matthew 10:29	Gospel of Matthew; Chapter 10	Succeeded by Matthew 10:31
