= Matthew 10:19 =

- ← 10:18 10:20 →
- Book: Gospel of Matthew
- Christian Bible part: New Testament

Matthew 10:19 is a verse in the tenth chapter of the Gospel of Matthew in the New Testament.

== Content ==
In the original Greek according to Westcott-Hort, this verse is:

Ὅταν δὲ παραδιδῶσιν ὑμᾶς, μὴ μεριμνήσητε πῶς ἢ τί λαλήσητε· δοθήσεται γὰρ ὑμῖν ἐν ἐκείνῃ τῇ ὥρᾳ τί λαλήσετε·

In the King James Version of the Bible the text reads:

But when they deliver you up, take no thought how or what ye shall speak: for it shall be given you in that same hour what ye shall speak.

The New International Version translates the passage as:

But when they arrest you, do not worry about what to say or how to say it. At that time you will be given what to say,

== Analysis ==
This is the eleventh ordinance of Christ to his apostles in which he forbids them being anxious about their answers. This was also promised by Christ in Luke's gospel: "I will give you a mouth and wisdom which none of your adversaries shall be able to gainsay or resist." So with St. Stephen it was said, "They were not able to resist the wisdom and spirit with which he spoke."

== Commentary from the Church Fathers ==
Chrysostom: " To the foregoing topics of consolation, He adds another not a little one; that they should not say, How shall we be able to persuade such men as these, when they shall persecute us? He bids them be of good courage respecting their answer, saying, When they shall deliver you up, take no thought how or what ye shall speak."

Saint Remigius: " How or what, one refers to the substance, the other to the expression in words. And because both of these would be supplied by Him, there was no need for the holy preachers to be anxious about either."

Preceded by Matthew 10:18	Gospel of Matthew; Chapter 10	Succeeded by Matthew 10:20
