= Coming Persecutions =

Jesus talked to his disciples of forthcoming persecutions

The Coming Persecutions, Matthew 10:16-23, is part of Jesus' speech of commission to his disciples. Immediately preceding these verses, he had commissioned them to evangelize the Israelites with his authority. As soon as he did this, he moved to telling them of the persecutions they will be subjected to for him, before moving to a description of the world in light of their teaching.

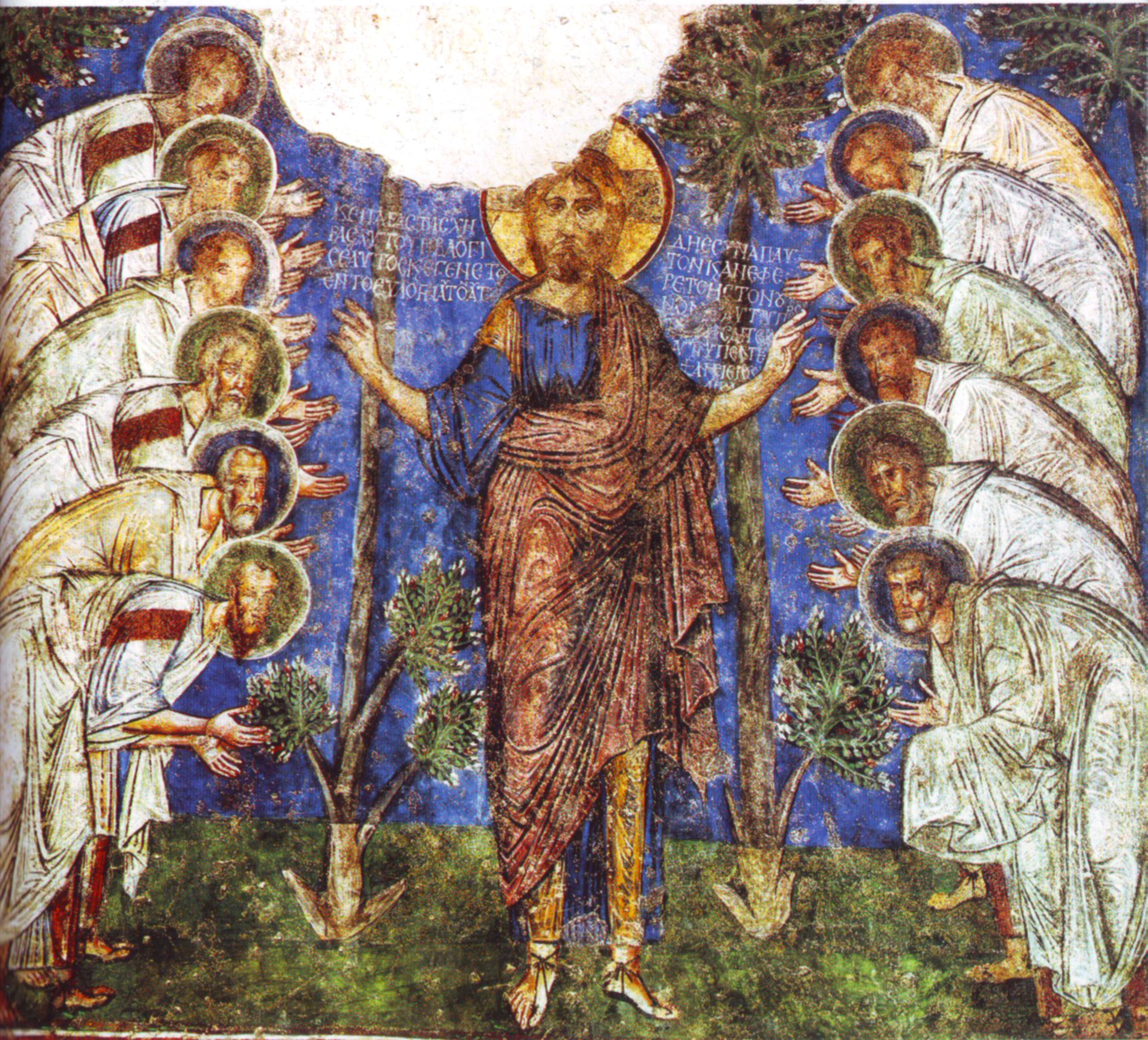
Jesus with the twelve apostles

== 10:16 Necessity of cunning and innocence ==
Behold, I send you out as sheep in the midst of wolves; so be wise as serpents and innocent as doves.

Inserting 'behold' into the midst of his commission of the Twelve Apostles draws attention to what Jesus begins to say here. It marks off this section as distinct from the preceding part of his instruction to the disciples. After drawing the attention of the disciples with 'behold', Jesus says, literally, 'I, even I, send you...'. Though in a different tense, this is a quotation of the Septuagint reading of Exodus 3:12, where God commissioned Moses to bring the Israelites out of Egypt. This would have brought to the disciples' attention that they were being commissioned to be the leaders of God's people, as was Moses.

He sends them as sheep among wolves, which brings to mind the messianic time envisioned at Isaiah 11:6, which says that the 'wolf shall dwell with the lamb'. Referring to them as sheep also highlights the danger they will face in their mission. It draws attention to Jesus' community as the true Israel, because Jewish literature had traditionally used sheep and wolf imagery of Israel and the nations. Because this verse follows on Jesus sending the twelve to the Israelites exclusively, the Jews hostile to his kingdom are now implicitly cast as wolves.

When he tells them to be as wise as serpents, this refers back to the Genesis story of Eden, where the serpent is called 'subtle', but the Greek is the same both here and there (at Gen 3:1). This wisdom entails avoiding danger, but only in ways consistent with their mission. Their wisdom is to be for self-preservation, rather than doing harm to others as did the serpent of Genesis. Augustine of Hippo saw this as an analogy in which Jesus was calling Christians to offer their whole body to persecutors rather than their head, as serpents do (they curl up their body around their head to protect it). This is emphasized by pairing the commandment to be like serpents with a commandment to be like doves.

Commanding them to be innocent as doves tells the disciples to have pure intentions—elsewhere it is a characteristic of those with integrity. The literal meaning of the Greek word translated 'innocent' is 'unmixed'. Elsewhere in the New Testament it is used in a meaning related to the simplicity of children, and it is meant to instruct the twelve that they are to set themselves wholly upon the mission entrusted to them by Jesus. This further shows that the wisdom of snakes, and the innocence of doves, while different, are not at odds. Because doves were used at the time to symbolize Israel, the text further points to the twelve as the centre of the true Israel.

Pairing the statement on snakes with one about doves seems to have been a trope in Jesus' time. Though the wisdom of the serpent has a positive connotation, it is also meant to contrast with the innocence of doves.

== 10:17 Persecution by Jews ==
Beware of men; for they will deliver you up to councils, and flog you in their synagogues

In this verse the wolves are seen in a vague way as 'men', or 'people'. However, it seems to point to persecution from Jewish officials, because the rest of the verse refers to judicial sentences carried out in the Jewish world of the day.

Some commentators see this as a redaction in which Matthew is writing in light of a 'serious cleavage' between Judaism and Christianity, because the twelve will be flogged in 'their' synagogues (presumably in opposition to the idea of synagogues of Jewish Christians or synagogues shared by both groups). Hagner further sees it as a redaction because the sentence continues in v. 18 in reference to witnessing to the nations, which would have been the case in the later Church, but not at the time of this speech of Jesus. In contrast, R. T. France sees that Jesus did speak these words here, and that he was looking to the future of the community's life from this early point. Similarly, Davies and Allison see this as evidence that Matthew's community continued to be close to the Jewish communities, because this verse indicates that they were submitting to the authority of the (Jewish) synagogues. Overall, Matthew's gospel is suited to a community closely related to Judaism, because of its messianism and emphasis on the covenant of Abraham.

'Councils' is literally 'sanhedrins', and necessarily refers to local governing bodies rather than to the national Sanhedrin in Jerusalem, because here the Greek is in plural form.

'Synagogues' is translated as 'assemblies' by France because he sees a difference in their function from the earlier uses of the word in Matthew, as meaning a location of worship and teaching. This points to the idea that 'synagogue' might refer to a grouping of the community, rather than a building used for worship. Leon Morris points out that synagogues were places not only of worship and teaching, but also of trials and the administration of justice.

That "synagogue" could refer to an assembly rather than a building, there may be a connection between being delivered up to councils and being flogged in the synagogues, as seen in the case of the apostles in Acts 5: being set before the Sanhedrin (v. 27) and then beaten (v. 40). This flogging was the well-known 39 lashes given for transgressions, in the eyes of the sanhedrin, of the Mosaic law. Nolland's belief lends itself to this connection, in that his causative translation of the verb linking councils and synagogues ('councils, and will have you flogged in...') makes a clearer connection between the action in each group. Also, Davies and Allison see that 'in' their synagogues could be translated 'by' or 'through' their synagogues. These points strengthen the idea that the synagogue could refer to an official gathering of the community, similar to the Sanhedrin, that would have exercised the authority of Deuteronomistic punishments.

== 10:18 The apostles' mission to the Gentile rulers ==
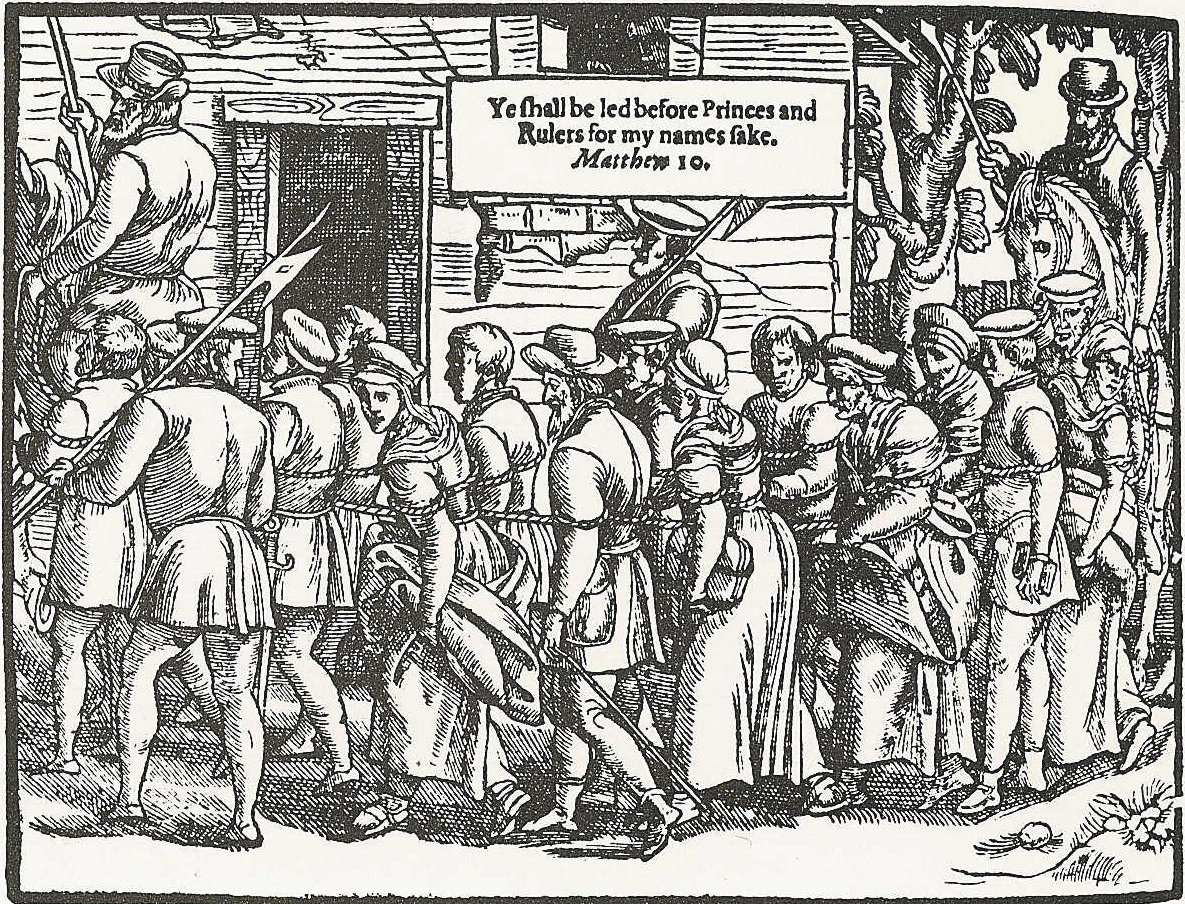
"Ye shall be led before Princes and Rulers for my names sake." From Foxe's Book of Martyrs, depicting arrested peasants who are tied up with rope and being led to London for trial.

and you will be dragged before governors and kings for my sake, to bear testimony before them and the Gentiles.

This verse moves the Twelve Apostles' mission from being restricted to the Jews, and points toward their mission to the Gentiles. Until this point in Matthew's gospel Jesus' ministry had been in Galilee. But at the time, Galilee had no Roman governor or king. (R.T. France distinguishes between kings and tetrarchs, which was the title of the region's Herod Antipas.) On this basis, commentators see v. 18 as a great leap from the following verse. However, something that France notes but does not seem interested in, is that four chapters later, Matthew refers to Herod as 'king'. This suggests that we should say that at the time Galilee did in fact have a king; and if Galilee had a king at the time Jesus said this, this verse is not so revolutionary as some make it out to be. Davies and Allison read the verse so that it does not need to envision action of the Twelve outside Palestine, because there were plenty of Roman officials in the land to whom they could witness.

The term translated "governors" is ἡγεμόνας (hēgemonas), simply meaning "leaders", while "kings" is βασιλεῖς (basileis).

Therefore, it does stand in marked contrast to the beginning of Jesus' commission, telling the twelve not to approach the Samaritans, much less the nations. The plurality of governors and kings suggests the situation of the Church after Peter's vision in Acts. Morris believes that this shows a shift in Jesus' meaning, from talking earlier about the immediate mission he was sending His twelve out for in Galilee, to now and following talking about their later missions to the Gentiles. This is because their restricted mission to the people of Israel would not have brought them into contact with the governors and kings of whom he spoke.

'To bear testimony before them' is problematic because it is unclear from the Greek syntax to whom 'them' refers. It could refer to the kings and governors, to the councils and synagogues, or to both. This passage is 'taken primarily from Mk 13.9-13', and in that version, 'and the Gentiles' does not follow, 'before them'. However, it is also unclear to whom 'them' refers in that passage. This fact, coupled with the fact that bearing witness to governors and kings would have been simultaneously bearing witness to the Gentiles over whom they ruled, suggests that 'them' refers to the councils and synagogues. It would have been redundant for Matthew the Evangelist to add on 'and the Gentiles' to his source-text, if he felt that 'them' referred in any way to the kings and governors.

The fact that the twelve will be 'dragged' before the nations' rulers reminds the reader of how the twelve will be as sheep among wolves.

== 10:19-20 Providence of words ==
When they deliver you up, do not be anxious about how you are to speak or what you are to say; for what you are to say will be given to you in that hour; for it is not you who speak, but the Spirit of your Father speaking through you.

Verse 19 connects explicitly to verse 17; the verb in the Greek for 'deliver you up' is the same in both (as well as in verse 21). This returns attention to the twelve in front of the Jewish officials, because this verb is not used of the twelve being brought before the Gentile officials. Had Matthew wanted it to refer to the twelve before the Gentile officials as well, he could have used the verb there as well, instead of 'dragged'.

'Do not be anxious' is the same language as is used in 6:25-34. The attitude of trust the twelve have when they are delivered up is to be the same attitude of trust they have in God in relation to bodily provision.

Matthew makes his version of this speech more intimate than that of his source, the Gospel of Mark, by saying that who will speak is 'the Spirit of your Father' (τὸ Πνεῦμα τοῦ Πατρὸς ὑμῶν, to Pneuma tou Patros hymōn) rather than 'the Holy Spirit.' Referring to God as Father of the listeners provides an additional connection between this passage and 6:25-34. It also reminds the twelve that their true family is not their earthly family, which they soon are to hear will deliver them up.

The outpouring of the Spirit on the disciples associates their ministry with that of Jesus, as an extension of it, because in Matthew's gospel references to the Spirit are only in relation to his operation in Jesus' ministry.

Davies and Allison suggest that the image of the Spirit speaking through the twelve is an eschatological marker, a marker of the end-times, because Jews expected a special outpouring of God's Spirit in the latter days.

== 10:21 Persecution by one's own family ==
Brother will deliver up brother to death, and the father his child, and children will rise against parents and have them put to death

Jesus' view of the situation to come for the Church is worse than at the beginning of this passage. Now when the twelve are delivered up it will be by their own kinsmen, and the penalty is to be capital punishment rather than flogging. The escalation of response to the mission of the twelve again suggests a larger audience than merely Galilee, and Davies and Allison say that it is clearly an expression of the post-Easter situation of the twelve.

The sense of eschatology is heightened because this verse alludes to Micah 7:6, which is eschatological in theme. Such conflict within families was seen as 'a sign of the End' in Jewish apocrypha.

The 'deliver[ing] up' and being put to death point to execution by authorities. This is in continuity with the echo of verses 17 and 19, which dealt with being accused before the sanhedrins. The same word is used in 10:4 of Judas Iscariot's betrayal of Jesus.

== 10:22 Necessity of endurance ==
and you will be hated by all for my name's sake. But he who endures to the end will be saved.

This verse is the climax of the increasingly bleak-looking picture of the persecutions to be endured by the twelve. 'For my name's sake' echoes 'for my sake' in verse 18.

The second half of this verse is unclear. Both 'to the end' and 'saved' can have multiple meanings. Elsewhere in Matthew 'to the end' can refer to the destruction of the Temple in 70, the Second Coming of Jesus, the end of persecution, the close of the age, or the end of an individual's life. France notes that there is no context to say for certain to what it refers here, and opts to view it as being as long as necessary to be saved, with reference to the rest of the verse. Thus he does not believe it to refer to any particular historical or eschatological event. Hill rejects this, saying that 'to the end' refers not to death by martyrdom, nor to the close of the age, but asserts, with no apparent reason, that it refers to the end of persecution. Davies and Allison examine the possible meanings, and how they are expressed elsewhere in Scripture, and believe that 'to the end' refers to the parousia (Second Coming).

France notes that 'saved' is used several different ways in Matthew: being saved from physical death or disease, corporate salvation from sins, a disciple's life being saved by losing his life, or it can be co-identified with entering the kingdom of God. Because he had already as much as told them they would be martyred (verse 20), Jesus would not be speaking here of salvation from death or disease. His meaning had to lie among the more spiritual meanings of the word. Hagner says that to be saved is to 'enter finally into the blessed peace promised to the participants in the kingdom.' The Catechism of the Catholic Church uses this verse to orient Catholics towards the hope of obtaining salvation.

== 10:23 The apostles are to go from town to town ==
When they persecute you in one town, flee to the next; for truly, I say to you, you will not have gone through all the towns of Israel, before the Son of man comes.

Going through all the towns of Israel may refer either to the twelve running out of cities to which they can flee, or to the completion of Israel's evangelization. However, because the two are so closely aligned—one will occur when the other does—it is little matter which one is read.

The Son of man is a figure borrowed from Daniel 7, and its use by Jesus is self-referential. Daniel 7:13 says, '...there came one like a son of man, and he came to the Ancient of Days and was presented before him.' The coming of the Son of man has been taken to refer to the parousia, the destruction of the Temple in Jerusalem, or some great event of early Christian history (e.g., the Resurrection, the Ascension, or Pentecost).

The parousia is rejected as too far removed from the Galilean setting of Jesus' public ministry, where he spoke these words to the twelve. Hagner rejects the early defining moments of Christianity as being too early for the persecution of the preceding verses to have developed. Working from the background of 'Son of man' in Daniel 7, where the figure approaches God, Morris does look to either the Resurrection or Ascension as the meaning of the mysterious phrase. He notes that at the time there was still work to be done in Israel. This is less natural than Hagner's interpretation, because it was not until after Pentecost that the twelve were persecuted as described in verses 17–22. Morris seems to have forgotten that he made this same point—just a few verses earlier, Jesus had shifted into speaking about the situation of the Church after he was to leave. There seems to be nothing here to indicate that Jesus has reverted to talking about the mission of the disciple while they were still accompanied by himself.

Hagner interprets the coming of the Son of man as referring to the destruction of the Temple—the coming of the Son of man as his judgement upon Israel. This time frame allowed for a development of the kind of persecution described in the earlier verses. Thus Hagner reads the verses as meaning that the twelve's exclusive mission to Israel will not end before 70, when the focus of salvation history would shift from the Jews to the Gentiles.

Giblin moves away from seeing the coming of the Son of man in temporal terms. Rather than reading the verse to mean that the coming of the Son of man stops short the mission of going through the towns of Israel, he translates it as meaning that the Son of man's coming completes and fulfills this mission. 'What the text has in view is not a single historical event as such but a theological understanding of the mission of the Church.' The sayings are addressed to the whole church, because it is apostolic.

France reaches a similar conclusion to that of Giblin. He notes that in Daniel 7, the coming of the Son of man is to God, and there is no indication of a coming to earth. The verb used in the LXX Daniel 7 and in allusions to it is distinct from parousia, so Matthew does not seem to want to convey parousia when speaking of the coming of the Son of man. France reads the coming of the Son of man as not a particular historical event, but as Jesus' enthronement, vindication, and empowering. This seems to lead the reader towards the Resurrection or Ascension, but he had earlier said that we are not to think of it as a particular point in time. It was begun at the resurrection, but continues throughout the Church's history until the Last Judgment.

Just as inserting 'behold' at verse 16 to mark the beginning of the section, so Matthew marks the end of the section with 'truly, I say to you'—this is parallel to the end of the prior section, at 10:15. The parallel here with verse 15, and at 16 with verses 5-6 (sheep), draws a strong connection between the two passages. Ulrich Luz identifies 'deliver up' as the theme of this passage, which serves to distinguish it from the mission section of verses 5-15.
