= Elijah (oratorio) =

Oratorio by Felix Mendelssohn

Elijah Elias
- Oratorio by Felix Mendelssohn
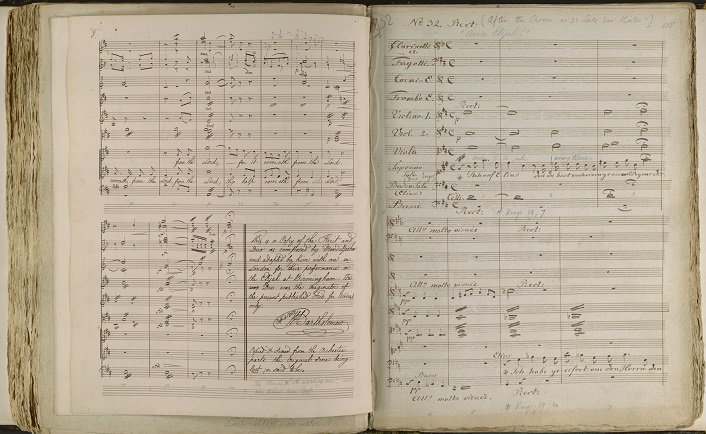
- The manuscript used for the premiere, by a copyist with notes by Mendelssohn, now in the collection of the Library of Birmingham
- Catalogue: MWV A 25
- Opus: 70
- Text: Julius Schubring
- Language: English, German
- Based on: Life of Elijah in biblical narration
- Performed: August 26, 1846
- Movements: 42
- Scoring: Bass-baritone, soprano, alto, tenor soloists; SATB choir; orchestra

Elijah (German: Elias), Op. 70, MWV A 25, is an oratorio by Felix Mendelssohn depicting events in the life of the Prophet Elijah as told in the books 1 Kings and 2 Kings of the Old Testament. It premiered on 26 August 1846.

== Music and its style ==
This piece was composed in the spirit of Mendelssohn's Baroque predecessors Bach and Handel, whose music he greatly admired. In 1829 Mendelssohn had organized the first performance of Bach's St Matthew Passion since the composer's death and was instrumental in bringing this and other Bach works to widespread popularity. By contrast, Handel's oratorios never went out of fashion in England. Mendelssohn prepared a scholarly edition of some of Handel's oratorios for publication in London. Elijah is modelled on the oratorios of these two Baroque masters; however, in its lyricism and use of orchestral and choral colour the style clearly reflects Mendelssohn's own skill as an early Romantic composer.

The work is scored for eight vocal soloists (two each of bass, tenor, alto, soprano), full symphony orchestra including 2 flutes, 2 oboes, 2 clarinets, 2 bassoons, 4 horns, 2 trumpets, 3 trombones, ophicleide, timpani, organ and strings and a large chorus usually singing in four, but occasionally eight parts. The title role was sung at the premiere by the Austrian bass Josef Staudigl.

Mendelssohn had discussed an oratorio based on Elijah in the late 1830s with his friend Karl Klingemann, who had provided him with the libretto for his comic operetta Die Heimkehr aus der Fremde, which resulted in a partial text that Klingemann was unable to finish. Mendelssohn then turned to Julius Schubring, the librettist for his earlier oratorio St. Paul, who quickly abandoned Klingemann's work and produced his own text that combined the story of Elijah as told in the Book of Kings with psalms. In 1845, the Birmingham Festival commissioned an oratorio from Mendelssohn, who worked with Schubring to put the text in final form and in 1845 and 1846 composed his oratorio to the German and English texts in parallel, taking care to change musical phrases to suit the rhythms and stresses of the translation by William Bartholomew, a chemist who was also an experienced amateur poet and composer.

The oratorio was first performed on 26 August 1846 at Birmingham Town Hall in its English version, conducted by the composer, and it was immediately acclaimed a classic of the genre. As The Times critic wrote: 'Never was there a more complete triumph – never a more thorough and speedy recognition of a great work of art'. Notwithstanding the work's triumph, Mendelssohn revised his oratorio wholesale before another group of performances in London in April 1847 – one (23 April) in the presence of Queen Victoria and Prince Albert. The German version was first performed on the composer's birthday, 3 February 1848, in Leipzig, a few months after Mendelssohn's death, under the baton of the composer Niels Gade.

== Biblical narrative ==
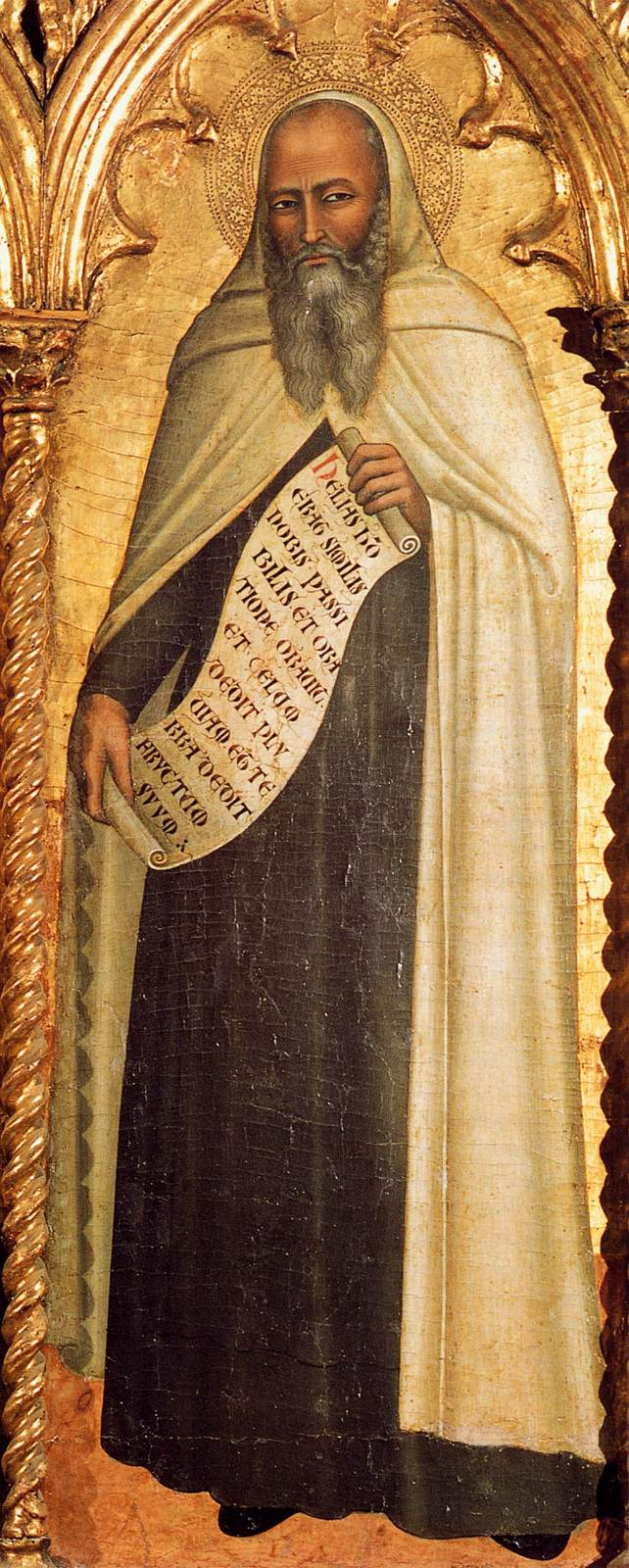
The oratorio depicts events in the life of the prophet Elijah

Mendelssohn uses biblical episodes relating to Elijah, which in the original, 1 Kings 17:19 and 2 Kings 2:1, are narrated in rather laconic form, to produce intensely dramatic scenes, while adding several related biblical texts, mostly taken from the Old Testament. These were doubtless well fitted to the taste of Mendelssohn's time, and a Victorian sentimentality also seems detectable in places.

Among the episodes is the resurrection of a dead youth. A dramatic episode is the contest of the gods, in which Jehovah consumes an offered sacrifice in a column of fire, while a sequence of increasingly frantic prayers by the prophets of the god Baal failed. Part I is concluded by the bringing of rain to parched Israel through Elijah's prayers. Part II depicts the persecution of Elijah by Queen Jezebel, his retirement to the desert, his vision of God appearing, his return to his work, and his ascension on a fiery chariot into heaven. The work ends with prophecies and praise.

=== Structure ===
The work in two parts opens with a declamation by Elijah, after which the overture is played. The sections are listed in the following table, with the text in both German and English, a biblical source for the passage (the dramatic action highlighted by a background colour), and the voices. The choir is mostly four-part SATB, but up to eight parts. The soloists are Elijah (baritone); soprano (S), singing the Widow, the Youth (sometimes taken by a boy treble) and Angel II; alto (A), singing Angel I and the Queen; and tenor (T), singing the parts of Obadiah and Ahab. The work is often performed with four soloists.

Some movements are simple oratorio forms such as recitative and aria, others explore hybrid combinations, such as recitative with choir, for dramatic effect. The fugal overture leads attacca to the first choral movement. The choir acts as the people ("Das Volk"), but also comments, like the choir in Greek drama. The narrative passages from the books of Kings are highlighted by green background.

Movements of Part I of Mendelssohn's Elijah
No.	Description	Incipit	Translation	Text source	Voices
	Introduction	So wahr der Herr, der Gott Israels lebet	As God the Lord of Israel liveth	1 Kings 17:1	Elijah
	Overture				
1	Chorus	Hilf, Herr!	Help, Lord!	Jeremiah 8:20 & Lamentations 4:4	SATB
2	Duet with choir	Herr, höre unser Gebet!	Lord! bow thine ear to our prayer!	2 Kings 19:16 & Lamentations 1:17	S S SATB
3	Recitative	Zerreißet eure Herzen	Ye people, rend your hearts	Joel 2:12-13	Obadiah
4	Aria	So ihr mich von ganzem Herzen suchet	If with all your hearts	Deuteronomy 4:29 & Job 23:3	Obadiah
5	Chorus	Aber der Herr sieht es nicht	Yet doth the Lord see it not	Exodus 20:5-6	SATB
6	Recitative	Elias, gehe von hinnen	Elijah! get thee hence	1 Kings 17:3-4	Angel I
7	Octet	Denn er hat seinen Engeln befohlen	For he shall give his angels	Psalm 91:11-12	Angels: SSAATTBB
7	Recitative	Nun auch der Bach vertrocknet ist	Now Cherith's brook is dried up	1 Kings 17:7, 1 Kings 17:9, & 1 Kings 17:14	Angel I
8	Recitative, aria and duet	Was hast du mir getan	What have I to do with thee?	1 Kings 17:17-24, Psalm 38:6, Psalm 86:15, Psalm 88:10 & Psalm 128:1	Widow, Elijah
9	Chorus	Wohl dem, der den Herrn fürchtet	Blessed are the men who fear him	Psalm 128:1, Psalm 112:1,4	SATB
10	Recitative with choir	So wahr der Herr Zebaoth lebet	As God the Lord of Sabaoth liveth	1 Kings 18:15, 1 Kings 18:17-19, & 1 Kings 18:23-25	Elijah, Ahab, SATB
11	Chorus	Baal erhöre uns!	Baal, we cry to thee; hear and answer us!	1 Kings 18:26	SSAATTBB
12	Recitative with choir	Rufet lauter! Denn er ist ja Gott!	Call him louder, for he is a god!	1 Kings 18:27	Elijah, SATB
13	Recitative with choir	Rufet lauter! Er hört euch nicht.	Call him louder! he heareth not!	1 Kings 18:28	Elijah, SATB
14	Aria	Herr, Gott Abrahams, Isaaks und Israels	Lord God of Abraham, Isaac and Israel!	1 Kings 18:36-37	Elijah, SATB
15	Quartet	Wirf dein Anliegen auf den Herrn	Cast thy burden upon the Lord	Psalm 55:22, Psalm 16:8, Psalm 108:5, & Psalm 25:3	S A T B
16	Recitative with choir	Der du deine Diener machst zu Geistern	O thou, who makest thine angels spirits (The fire descends)	1 Kings 18:38-40, Deuteronomy 6:4	Elijah, SATB
17	Aria	Ist nicht des Herrn Wort wie ein Feuer	Is not his word like a fire?	Jeremiah 23:29 & Psalm 7:11-12	Elijah
18	Arioso	Weh ihnen, dass sie von mir weichen!	Woe unto them who forsake him!	Hosea 7:13	A
19	Recitative with choir	Hilf deinem Volk, du Mann Gottes!	O man of God, help thy people!	1 Kings 18:43-45, Jeremiah 14:22, 2 Chronicles 6:19, Deuteronomy 28:23, & Psalm 28:1	Obadiah, Elijah, SATB, Youth
20	Chorus	Dank sei dir, Gott	Thanks be to God	Psalm 93:3-4	SATB

Movements of Part II of Mendelssohn's Elijah
No.	Description	Incipit	Translation	Source	Voices
21	Aria	Höre, Israel	Hear ye, Israel!	Deuteronomy 6:4, Isaiah 41:10, Isaiah 48:1,18, Isaiah 49:7, Isaiah 51:12-13, & Isaiah 53:1	S
22	Chorus	Fürchte dich nicht, spricht unser Gott	Be not afraid, saith God the Lord	Isaiah 41:10 & Psalm 91:7	SATB
23	Recitative with choir	Der Herr hat dich erhoben	The Lord hath exalted thee	1 Kings 14:7, 1 Kings 14:9, 1 Kings 14:15, & 1 Kings 16:30-33	Elijah, Queen, SATB
24	Chorus	Wehe ihm, er muss sterben!	Woe to him, he shall perish	1 Kings 19:2, 1 Kings 21:7, Jeremiah 26:9,11, & Ecclesiasticus 48:2-3	SATB
25	Recitative	Du Mann Gottes, laß meine Rede	Man of God, now let my words	2 Kings 1:13, Jeremiah 5:3, Jeremiah 26:11, Psalm 59:3, 1 Kings 19:4, Deuteronomy 31:6, Exodus 12:32, & 1 Samuel 17:37	Obadiah, Elijah
26	Aria	Es ist genug, so nimm nun, Herr, meine Seele	It is enough, O Lord now take away my life	1 Kings 19:4, 1 Kings 19:10, & Job 7:16	Elijah
27	Recitative	Siehe, er schläft	See, now he sleepeth	1 Kings 19:5 & Psalm 34:7	Unnamed Tenor
28	Trio	Hebe deine Augen auf zu den Bergen	Lift thine eyes	Psalm 121:1-3	Angels: S S A
29	Chorus	Siehe, der Hüter Israels schläft noch schlummert nicht	He, watching over Israel, slumbers not	Psalm 121:4 & Psalm 138:7	SATB
30	Recitative	Stehe auf, Elias, denn du hast einen großen Weg vor dir	Arise, Elijah, for thou hast a long journey	1 Kings 19:7-8, Isaiah 49:4, & Isaiah 64:1-2	Angel I, Elijah
31	Aria	Sei stille dem Herrn	O rest in the Lord	Psalm 37:1,7	Angel I: Alto
32	Chorus	Wer bis an das Ende beharrt, der wird selig.	He that shall endure to the end, shall be saved.	Matthew 10:22 Matthew 24:13	SATB
33	Recitative	Herr, es wird Nacht um mich	Night falleth round me, O Lord!	1 Kings 19:11-25 & 1 Kings 19:11	Elijah, Angel II
34	Chorus	Der Herr ging vorüber	Behold! God the Lord passeth by!	1 Kings 19:11-12	SATB
35	Quartet with choir	Seraphim standen über ihm; Heilig ist Gott der Herr	Above him stood the Seraphim; Holy is God the Lord	Isaiah 6:2-3	A; S S A A SATB
36	Choir and recitative	Gehe wiederum hinab! Ich gehe hinab	Go, return upon thy way! I go on my way	1 Kings 19:15-18, Psalm 71:16, Psalm 16:2,9	SSATTBB, Elijah
37	Arioso	Ja, es sollen wohl die Berge weichen	For the mountains shall depart	Isaiah 54:10	Elijah
38	Chorus	Und der Prophet Elias brach hervor	Then did Elijah the prophet break forth	2 Kings 2:1, 2 Kings 2:11, Ecclesiasticus 48:1, & Ecclesiasticus 48:6-7	SATB
39	Aria	Dann werden die Gerechten leuchten	Then shall the righteous shine forth	Matthew 13:43 & Isaiah 51:11	T
40	Recitative	Darum ward gesendet der Prophet Elias	Behold, God hath sent Elijah	Malachi 4:5-6	S
41	Chorus	Aber einer erwacht von Mitternacht	But the Lord, from the north hath raised one	Isaiah 41:25, Isaiah 42:1, Isaiah 11:2, Isaiah 41:25, Isaiah 42:1, & Isaiah 11:2	SSAATTBB
	Quartet	Wohlan, alle, die ihr durstig seid	O come evr'y one that thirsteth	Isaiah 55:1	S A T B
42	Chorus	Alsdann wird euer Licht hervorbrechen	And then shall your light break forth	Isaiah 58:8 Isaiah 63:8	SATB
42	Chorus	Herr, unser Herrscher	Lord, our Creator	Psalm 8:1	SATB

== Reception ==
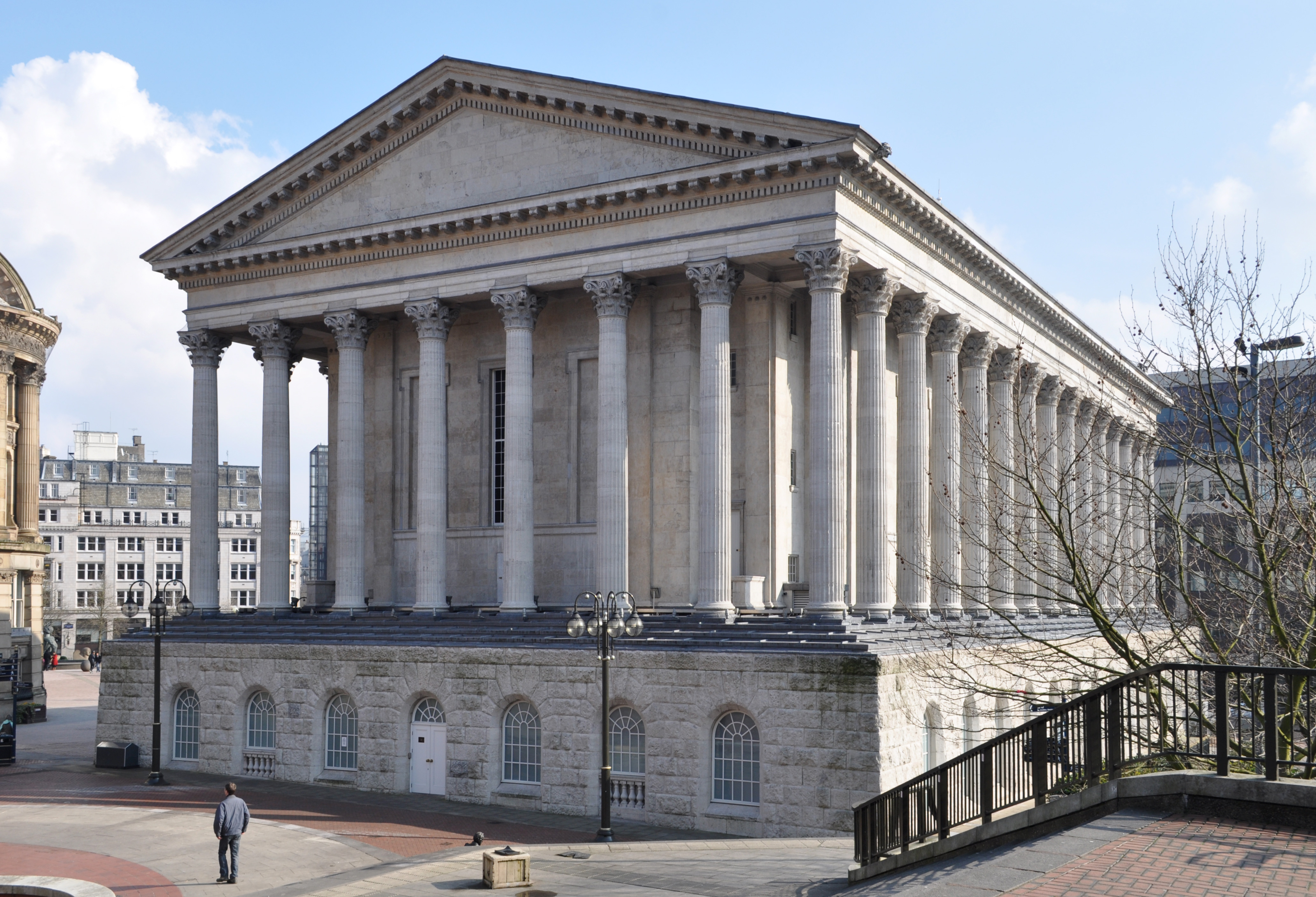
Birmingham Town Hall, where Elijah premiered

Elijah was popular at its premiere and has been frequently performed, particularly in English-speaking countries, ever since. It is a particular favourite of amateur choral societies. Its melodrama, easy appeal and stirring choruses have provided the basis for countless successful performances. Prince Albert inscribed a libretto for the oratorio Elijah in 1847: "To the noble artist who, surrounded by the Baal-worship of false art, has been able, like a second Elijah, through genius and study, to remain true to the service of true art." A number of critics later treated the work harshly, however, emphasizing its conventional outlook and undaring musical style. Bernard Shaw wrote in 1892:

I sat out the performance on Wednesday to the last note, an act of professional devotion which was no part of my plan for the evening ... You have only to think of Parsifal, of the Ninth Symphony, of Die Zauberflöte, of the inspired moments of Bach and Handel, to see the great gulf that lies between the true religious sentiment and our delight in Mendelssohn's exquisite prettiness.

Similarly, after Boston's Handel and Haydn Society presented the work for the first time in February 1848, its success resulted in eight more performances that spring. In the mid-1920s, however, H.T. Parker, the city's principal music critic, described how members of the audience gazed upward at a recent performance: "How many of those eyes were there in rapture, or were counting the four dead lights in the central sunburst of the ceiling?.... Elijah is hopelessly, awfully, irremediably mid-Victorian.

However, with the widespread re-evaluation of Mendelssohn’s work in the late 20th and early 21st centuries, these critical opinions have largely changed. In his definitive biography of the composer, the musicologist R. Larry Todd wrote that “the oratorio was the crowning achievement of Felix’s career”. And in 2005 critic and musicologist Michael Steinberg described Elijah as “thrilling to sing” and noted that it “includes some of Mendelssohn’s finest music”.

Mendelssohn wrote the soprano part in Elijah for the 'Swedish Nightingale', Jenny Lind, although she was unavailable to sing the Birmingham premiere. In her place, the part was created by Maria Caterina Rosalbina Caradori-Allan. Lind was devastated by the composer's premature death in 1847. She did not feel able to sing the part for a year afterwards. She resumed singing the piece at Exeter Hall in London in late 1848, raising £1,000 to fund a scholarship in his name. After Arthur Sullivan became the first recipient of the Mendelssohn Scholarship, she encouraged him in his career.

Charles Salaman adapted "He that Shall Endure to the End" from Elijah as a setting for Psalm 93 (Adonai Malakh), sung on most Friday nights at the sabbath-eve service of the London Spanish & Portuguese Jewish community.
