= Matthew 10:22 =

- ← 10:21 10:23 →
- Book: Gospel of Matthew
- Christian Bible part: New Testament

Matthew 10:22 is a verse in the tenth chapter of the Gospel of Matthew in the New Testament.

== Content ==
In the original Greek according to Westcott-Hort for this verse is:

Καὶ ἔσεσθε μισούμενοι ὑπὸ πάντων διὰ τὸ ὄνομά μου· ὁ δὲ ὑπομείνας εἰς τέλος, οὗτος σωθήσεται.

In the King James Version of the Bible the text reads:

And ye shall be hated of all men for my name’s sake: but he that endureth to the end shall be saved.

The New International Version translates the passage as:

All men will hate you because of me, but he who stands firm to the end will be saved.

== Analysis ==
Lapide points out the source of hatred would come both from the ruling Jews (who were accustomed to Moses) and the governing Gentiles (who were attached to their gods), being disturbed by the new doctrine. MacEvilly notes that Jesus commands that his followers must endure until the end, not just win once or twice. The same is said in Revelation, "be faithful unto death, and I will give you the crown of life."

== Commentary from the Church Fathers ==
Chrysostom: " What follows is yet more dreadful, Ye shall be hated of all men; they sought to exterminate them as common enemies of all the world. To this again is added the consolation, For my name’s sake; and yet further to cheer them, Whosoever shall endure to the end, he shall be saved. For many are hot and zealous in the beginning, but afterwards grow cool, for these, He says, I look at the end. For where is the profit of seeds that only sprout at first? wherefore He requires a sufficient endurance from them."

Jerome: " For virtue is not to begin but to complete."

Saint Remigius: " And the reward is not for those that begin, but for those that bring to an end."

Chrysostom: " But that no man should say, that Christ wrought all things in His Apostles, and therefore it is nothing wonderful that they were made such as they were, since they did not bear the burden of these things, therefore He says, that perseverance was their work. For though they were rescued from their first perils; they are preserved for still harder trials, which again shall be followed by others, and they shall be in danger of snares as long as they live. This He covertly intimates when he says, Whosoever shall endure to the end, he shall be saved."

Saint Remigius: " That is, He who shall not let go the commands of the faith, nor fall away in persecution, shall be saved; he shall receive the reward of the heavenly kingdom for his earthly persecutions. And note that ‘the end’ does not always mean destruction, but sometimes perfection, as in that, Christ is the end of the Law. (Rom. 10:4.) So the sense here may be, Whosoever shall endure to the end, that is, in Christ."

Augustine: "To endure in Christ, is to abide in His faith which worketh by love."

Preceded by Matthew 10:21	Gospel of Matthew; Chapter 10	Succeeded by Matthew 10:23
