= Uncial 0171 =

- New Testament manuscript
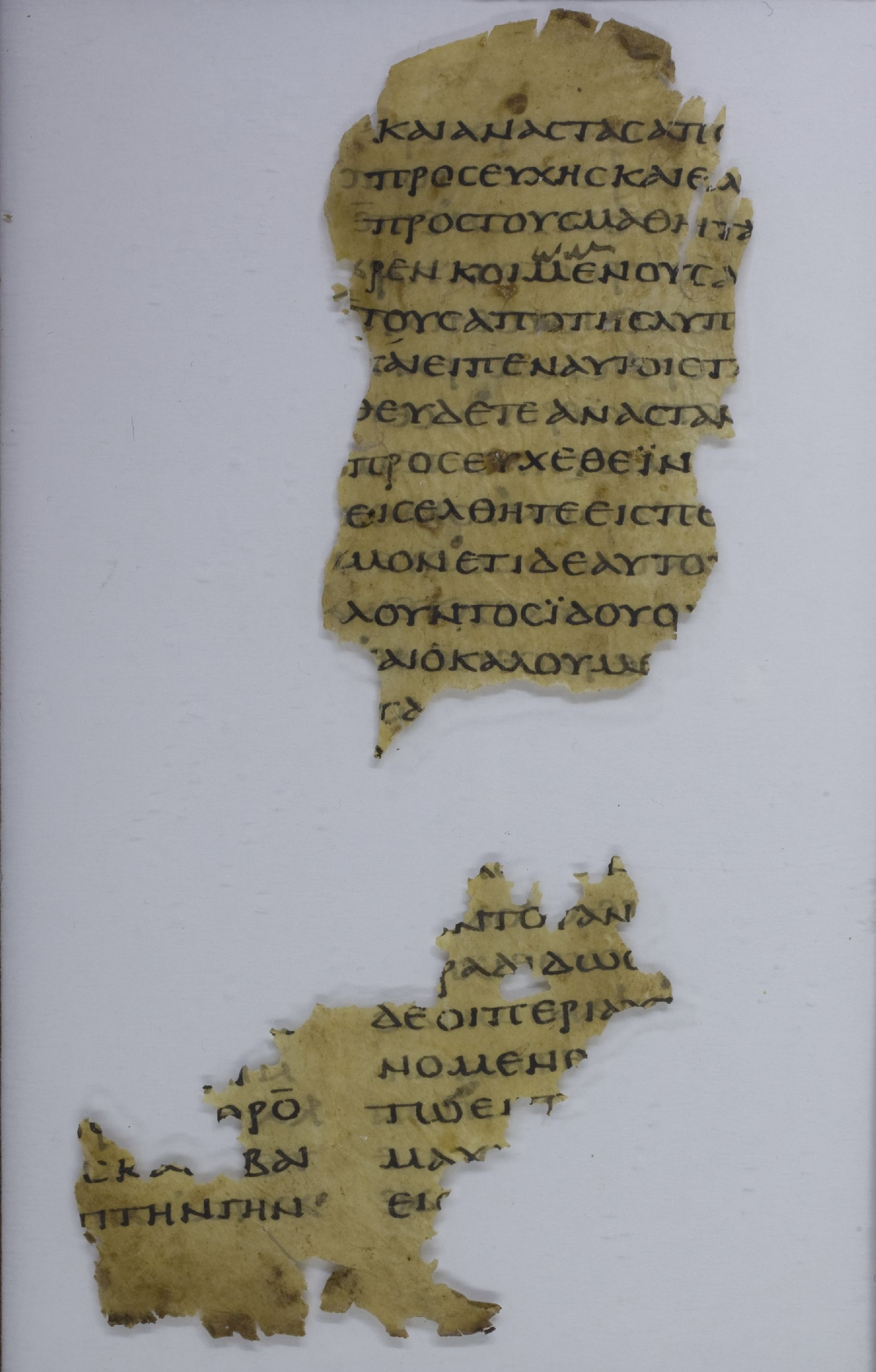
- Text: Matthew 10:17-23,25-32; Luke 22:44-50,52-56,61,63-64
- Date: c. 300
- Script: Greek
- Found: Hermopolis Magna, Egypt
- Now at: Medici Library; Berlin State Museums
- Cite: Papiri greci e latini della Società Italiana, (Florence, 1912—), 1:2-4; 2:22-25
- Size: 2 vellum leaves; 5.7 x 9.2 cm; 2 columns, 23 lines/page
- Type: Western
- Category: IV
- Hand: reformed documentary
- Note: witness to Western text in Egypt

Uncial 0171 (in the Gregory-Aland numbering), ε 07 (Soden) are two vellum leaves of a late third century (or beginning of the fourth) Greek uncial Bible codex containing fragments of the Gospel of Matthew and the Gospel of Luke. The Luke fragment, in two parts, is preserved in the Laurentian Library collection in Florence (PSI 1.2 + PSI 2.124), and the Matthew fragment is in the Berlin State Museum (P. 11863).

== Description ==
Uncial 0171 measures 5.7 cm by 9.2 cm from a page of two columns of 23 lines. The scribe wrote in a reformed documentary hand. It has errors of itacism, the nomina sacra are contracted (Κ̅Σ̅, Ι̅Η̅Σ̅). ανθρωπος is uncontracted. Luke 22:51 and 22:62 are omitted.

The Alands describe the text as "an early (secondary?) form of the D [Codex Bezae] text" and "paraphrastic". Uncial 0171 is an important witness to the existence of the Western text-type in Egypt. Aland placed it in Category IV. It is the earliest Greek witness with text of Luke 22:43–44.

It is classed as a "consistently cited witness of the first order" in Nestle-Aland's Novum Testamentum Graece. Its 27th edition (NA27) considers it even more highly than other witnesses of this type. It provides an exclamation mark (!) for "papyri and uncial manuscripts of particular significance because of their age."

The manuscript was found in 1903–1905 in Hermopolis Magna. The text was first published by the Società Italiana in Florence in 1912. Hermann von Soden knew the first fragment only in time to include it in the list of addenda in 1913. He classified it within his Ια text. Marie-Joseph Lagrange gave a collation, he classifies the fragment in his "recension D", and argues that the divergences of the fragment from the Codex Bezae are due to idiosyncrasies either of that manuscript or of the fragment itself. Kurt Treu identified the Matthew and Luke portions as the work of the same scribe on the same codex. Later again, Neville Birdsall observed that a lower portion of the manuscript had been overlooked in the editio princeps.

== Text ==
Fragment (a) + (b): Recto (Luke 22:44-50)

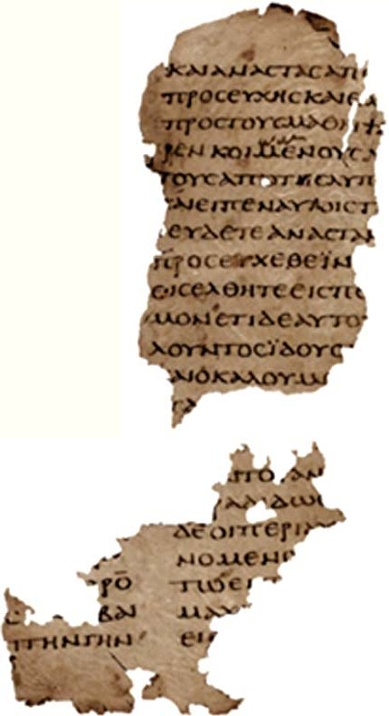

| Col. I — — — — — — — — [ . . . . . . . ] [ . . . . . . . ] [ αυ]το[υ ως] θρο(μ)- [βοι αιματο]ς καταβαι- [νοντες ε]πι την γην | Col. II και αναστας απο [της] προσευχης και ελ[θων] προς τους μαθητα[ς ευ-] ωμ ρεν κοιμενους α[υ-] τους απο της λυπ[ης] και ειπεν αυτοις τ[ι κα-] θευδετε ανασταν[τες] προσευχεθε ιν[α μη] εισελθητε εις πε[ιρασ-] μον ετι δε αυτου [λα] λουντος ιδου οχ[λος] και ο καλουμε[νος Ι-] [ο]υδ[ας Ισκαριωθ εις] — — — — — — — — — — — — — — — — [ . . . ] . [ . . . . ] . [ . . . . . ] [υι]ον του αν[θρωπου] [πα]ραδιδως [ιδοντες] δε οι περι αυ[τον το γε-] νομενο[ν ειπαν αυ- τω ει π[αταξομεν εν] μαχα[ιρη και επαταξεν] εις [τις εξ αυτων τον] |

Fragment (a) + (b): Verso (Luke 22:50-56.61-64)

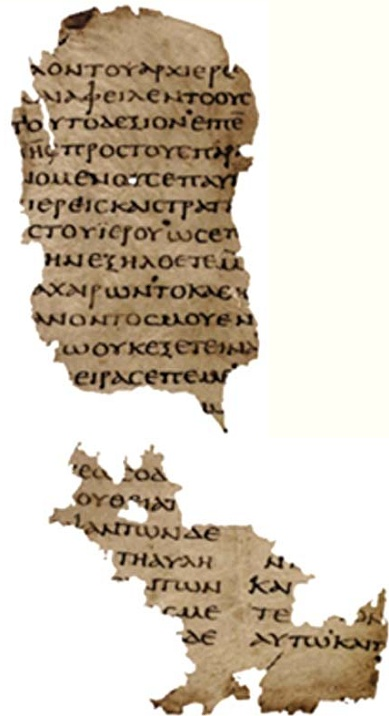

| Col. I [δου]λον του αρχιερε- [ως] και αφειλεν το ους [αυ]του δο δεξιον ειπε(ν) [δε] ιης προς τους παρα- [γε]νομενους επ αυτο(ν) [αρ]χιερεις και στρατη- [γο]υς του ιερου ως επ[ι] [ληστ]ην εξηλθετε με- [τα μ]αχαιρων το καθ η- [με]ραν οντος μου εν [τω ι]ερω ουκ εξετεινα- [τε] χειρας επ εμε [αλλα] [αυτη εστιν υμων η] ω[ρα] — — — — — — — — — — — — — — — — [ . . . . ] . . [ . . ] . . . [του αρχιε]ρεως ο δε [Πε-] [τρος ηκο]λουθει απ[ο] [μακροθεν] αψαντων δε [πυρ εν μεσ]η τη αυλη [και περικαθι]σαντων [εκαυθητο ο Πετρ]ος με- [σος αυτων ιδουσα] δε | Col. II — — — — — — — —. [ απαρ-] νησ[η ] και ο[ι ανδ]ρε[ς οι συνεχον-] τες [α]υτον [ενεπαιζον] αυτω και π[ερικαλυψαν-] [τες ] |

Fragment (c): Recto (hair side) (Matthew 10:17-23)

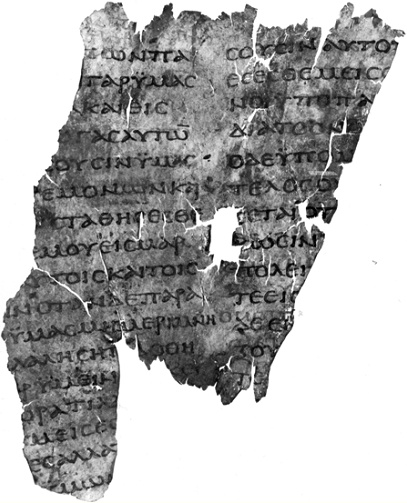

| Col. I [ ανθρω]πων πα- [ραδωσουσιν] γαρ υμας [εις συνεδρι]α και εις [τας συναγ]ωγας αυτω [μαστιγω]σουσιν υμας [και επι η]γεμονων και [βασιλεω]ν σταθησεσθε [ενεκεν] εμου εις μαρ- [τυριον] αυτοις και τοις [εθνεσ]ιν οταν δε παρα- [δωσιν] υμας μη μεριμνη- [σητε τι] λαλησητε[ε] δοθη- [σεται γ]αρ υμειν [εν ε]κει- [νη τη] ωρα τι λα[λησητε] [ου γαρ υ]μεις εσ[τε οι λα-] [λουντ]ες αλλα τ[ο π̅ν̅α̅] [του π̅ρ̅ς̅] υμων [ ] — — — — — — — — | Col. II σουσιν αυτου[ς και] εσεσθε μεισο[υμε-] νοι υπο πα[ντων] δια το ονο[μα μου] ο δε υπομ[εινας εις] τελος ου[τος σωθη-] σεται οτ[αν δε διω-] κωσιν [υμας εν τη] πολει [ταυτη φευγε-] τε εις [την αλλην εαν] δε εν [τη αλλη εκδιω-] ξου[σιν υμας φευγε-] τε [ ] — — — — — — — — |

Fragment (c): Verso (flesh side) (Matthew 10:25-32)

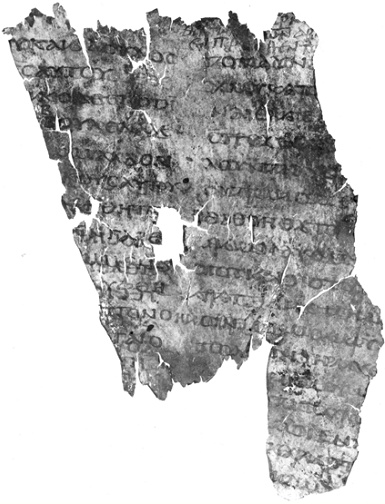

| Col. I [αυτο]υ και ο δουλος [ως ο κ]ς αυτου [ει τον ο]ικοδεσποτη [ ]βουλ εκαλε- [σαν ποσ]ω μαλλον [τους οικια]κους αυτου [μη ουν φο]βηθητε [αυτους ουδ]εν γαρ ε- [στιν κεκαλυ]μμενο [ο ουκ αποκα]λυφθη- [σεται και κρυ]πτον ο [ου γνωσθησε]ται ο [λεγω υμιν εν] τη σ- [κοτια ειπατε] . [ . . ] — — — — — — — — | Col. II τον δυνα[μενον και ψυ] χην και σ[ωμα αποκτει-] ναι εν γεε[ννη ουχι δου] στρουθια ασ[σαριου πω-] λουνται και[ εν εξ αυτων] ου πεσειται ε[πι την γην] ανευ του πα[ρος υ-] μων αλλα κα[ι αι τριχες] της κεφαλης [υμων] πασαι ηριθμημ[εναι ει-] σιν μη ουν φο[βεισθε] πολλων στρουθ[ιων] δ[ιαφε]ρετε υμ[εις πας] [ουν οσ]τις ομο[λογησει] [εν ε]μοι ενπ[ροσθεν] [των α]νθρωπ[ων ομο-] [λογ]ησω [ ] — — — — — — — — |

== See also ==
Other early uncials

- Uncial 0162
- Uncial 0176
- Uncial 0189
- Uncial 0220
- Uncial 0308

Related articles

- List of New Testament uncials
- Textual criticism
