= Papyrus 110 =

- New Testament manuscript
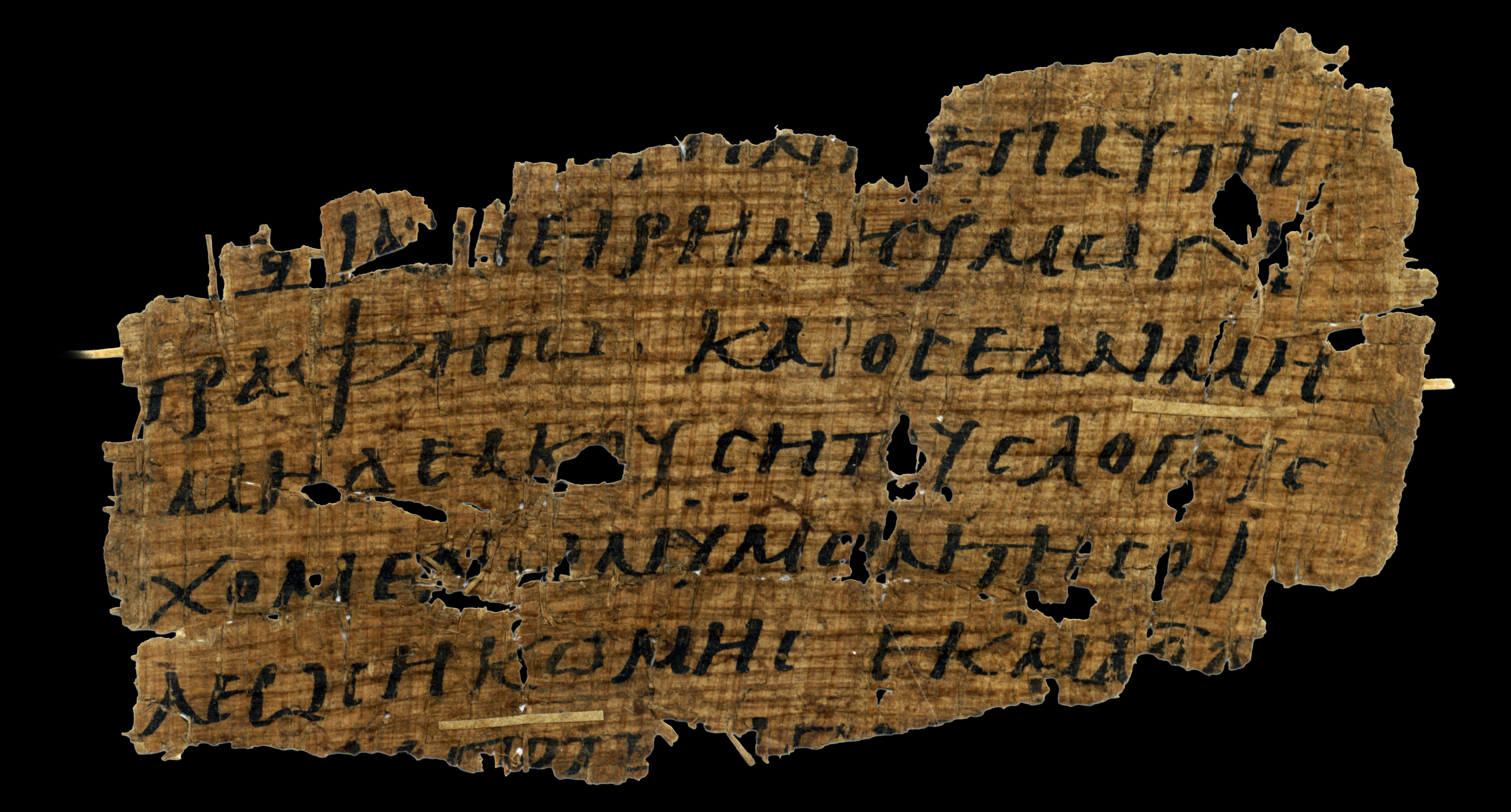
- Recto, Matthew 10:13-14
- Name: P. Oxy. 4494
- Sign: 𝔓^{110}
- Text: Gospel of Matthew 10:13-15,25-27
- Date: 4th century
- Script: Greek
- Found: Oxyrhynchus, Egypt
- Now at: Sackler Library
- Cite: W. E. H. Cockle, OP LXV (1999), pp. 1-3
- Size: [22] x [12] cm
- Type: Alexandrian text-type
- Category: none
- Note: unique readings in Matt. 10:14

Papyrus 110, designated by 𝔓^{110} (in the Gregory-Aland numbering of New Testament manuscripts) is a copy of the New Testament in Greek. It is a papyrus manuscripts of the Gospel of Matthew, containing verses 10:13-15 & 10:25-27 in a fragmentary condition. Using the study of comparative writings styles (palaeography), the manuscript has been dated by the INTF to the early 4th century CE. Papyrologist Philip Comfort dates the manuscript to Middle-Late 3rd century CE. The manuscript is currently housed in the Papyrology Rooms of the Bodleian Art, Archaeology and Ancient World Library at Oxford University, with the shelf number P. Oxy. 4494.

== Description ==
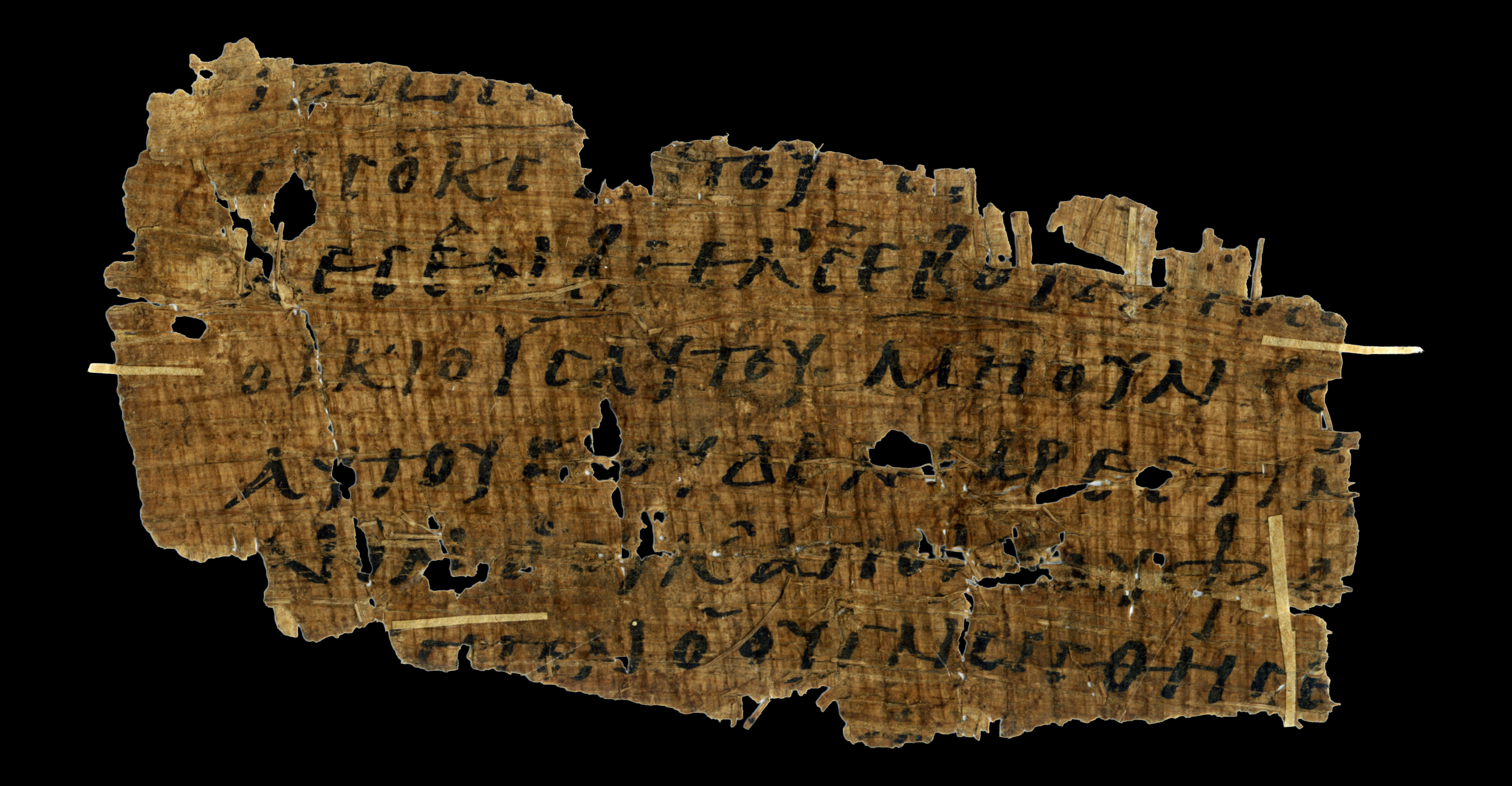
Verso, Matthew 10:25-27

The original manuscript would have been a codex (precursor to the modern book), around 12 cm x 22 cm in size, with 40–43 lines per page. The handwriting script is representative of the Reformed Documentary or Professional (bookhand) style, which is also known as the Severe Style. The Greek text of this fragment is considered to be representative of the Alexandrian text-type, with some unique readings.

== Unique readings ==
𝔓^{110} has several unique readings:

Matthew 10:14

- εξερχομενων υμων (as you are leaving) : 𝔓^{110}

εξερχομενοι : Majority of manuscripts

- πολεως η κωμης (city or village) : 𝔓^{110} א 892 ƒ^{13}

πολεως : Majority of manuscripts

- εκεινης (that)

omit : 𝔓^{110} D lat
incl. : Majority of manuscripts

- απο (from) : 𝔓^{110}

ἐκ : א C 33 892
omit : B Majority of manuscripts

- εκμαξατε (wipe) : 𝔓^{110}

εκτιναξατε (shake) : Majority of manuscripts

Matthew 10:14 in 𝔓^{110}	Matthew 10:14 in Editio Regia (1550)	Matthew 10:14 in NA27
και ος εαν μη δεξηται υμας μηδε ακουση τους λογους εξερχομενων υμων της οικιας η της πολεως η κωμης εκμαξατε τον κονιορτον απο των ποδων υμων.	και ος εαν μη δεξηται υμας μηδε ακουση τους λογους υμων, εξερχομενοι της οικιας η της πολεως εκεινης εκτιναξατε τον κονιορτον των ποδων υμων.	και ος αν μη δεξηται υμας μηδε ακουση τους λογους υμων, εξερχομενοι εξω της οικιας η της πολεως εκεινης εκτιναξατε τον κονιορτον των ποδων υμων.
And if anyone does not accept you nor listen to the words, as you are leaving the house or the city or village, wipe the dust away from your feet.	And if anyone does not accept you nor listen to your words, leave that house or city, shake the dust from your feet.	And whoever does not accept you nor listen to your words, leave, out of that house or city, shake the dust from your feet.

Matthew 10:25 (1)

επεκαλεσαν βεελζεβουλ : 𝔓^{110}^{c}
βεελζεβουλ επεκαλεσαν : א^{c2} C W ƒ^{13} 33 Majority of manuscripts it sy^{h} co Cyp

10:25 (a)
βεελσεβουλ : 𝔓^{110}*
βεελζεβουλ : 𝔓^{110}^{c} Θ 0171 ƒ^{1} 700 1424 L N pm

βεεζεβουλ : א^{c2} B pc

10:25 (b)
επεκαλεσεν : 𝔓^{110}*
επεκαλεσαν : 𝔓^{110}^{c} א^{c2} B C W ƒ^{13} 33 $\mathfrak{M}$ it sy^{h} co Cyp
επεκαλεσαντο : א* L N pc
εκαλεσαν : Θ 0171 ƒ^{1} 700 1424 pm
καλουσιν : D

10:25 (2)

τοις : 𝔓^{110}* B
τους : א D C W ƒ^{13} $\mathfrak{M}$ it sy^{h} co

10:25 (3)

οικιοις : 𝔓^{110}*
οικιους : 𝔓^{110}^{c}
οικιακοις : B
οικειακους : D
οικιακους : א C W ƒ^{13} $\mathfrak{M}$ it sy^{h} co

== See also ==
- List of New Testament papyri
- Matthew 10
- Oxyrhynchus Papyri
