= Matthew 10 =

- ← chapter 9 chapter 11 →
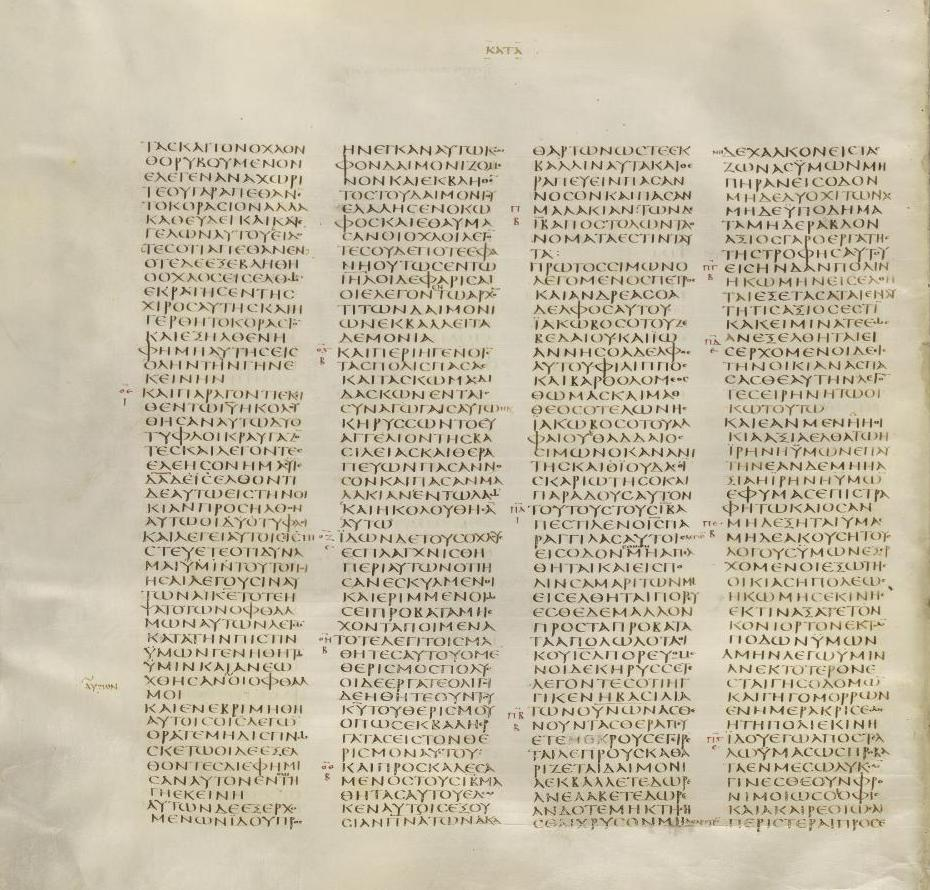
- Gospel of Matthew 9:23–10:17 on Codex Sinaiticus, made about AD 330–360
- Book: Gospel of Matthew
- Category: Gospel
- Christian Bible part: New Testament
- Order in the Christian part: 1

Matthew 10 is the tenth chapter in the Gospel of Matthew in the New Testament section of the Christian Bible. This chapter opens with Jesus calling some of his disciples and sending them out to preach and heal. This chapter is also known as the Mission Discourse, the Apostolic Discourse, or the Little Commission, in contrast to the Great Commission at the end of the gospel (Matthew 28:18–20). The Apostles receiving the Little Commission are directed to enter only the towns of the "lost sheep of the house of Israel" in verse 6, but verse 18 mentions that they will also be a witness to "governors, kings and the Gentiles" while in those towns. In contrast, the Great Commission is specifically directed to all nations. This has led to debate as to whom the target audience of Jesus' original, pre-resurrection ministry was.

Matthew names the twelve apostles, or "twelve disciples", in verses 2 to 4, and gives them careful instruction as they travel around Israel. The remainder of the chapter consists almost entirely of sayings attributed to Jesus. Many of the sayings found in Matthew 10 are also found in Luke 10 and the Gospel of Thomas, which is not part of the accepted canon of the New Testament.

== Text ==
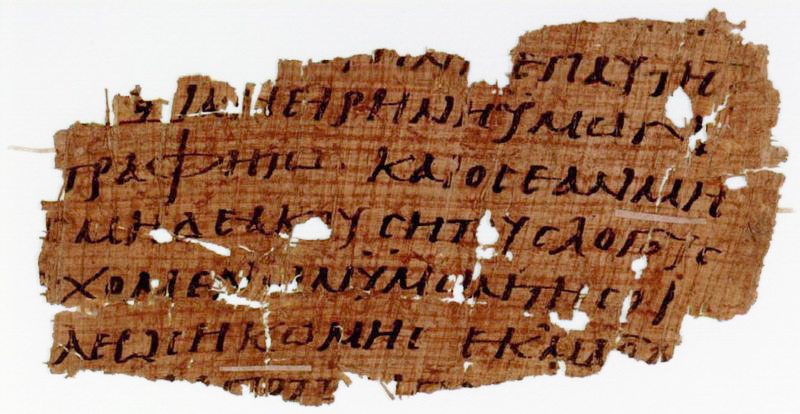
Matthew 10:13–15 on Papyrus 110 (3rd/4th century), recto side

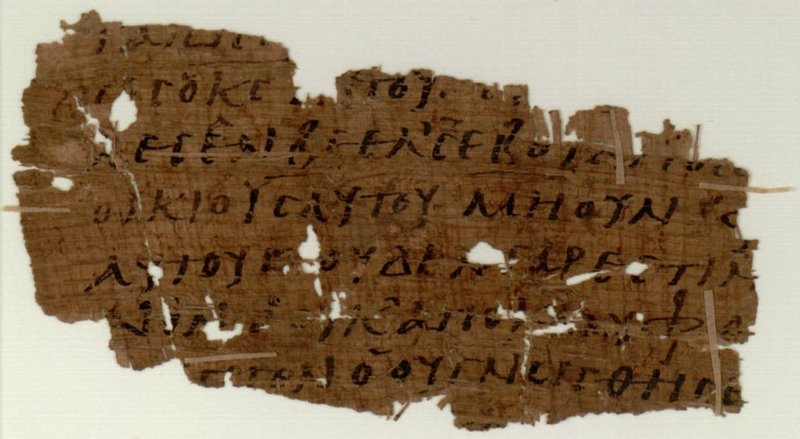
Matthew 10:25–27 on Papyrus 110 (3rd/4th century), verso side

The oldest known texts were written in Koine Greek. This chapter is divided into 42 verses.

=== Textual witnesses ===
Some early manuscripts containing the text of this chapter are:

- Papyrus 110 (3rd/4th century; extant verses 13–15, 25–27)
- Uncial 0171 (~300; extant verses 17–23, 25–32)
- Codex Vaticanus (325–350)
- Codex Sinaiticus (330–360; complete)
- Codex Bezae (~400)
- Papyrus 19 (4th/5th century; extant verses 32–42)
- Codex Ephraemi Rescriptus (~450; complete)
- Codex Petropolitanus Purpureus (6th century)

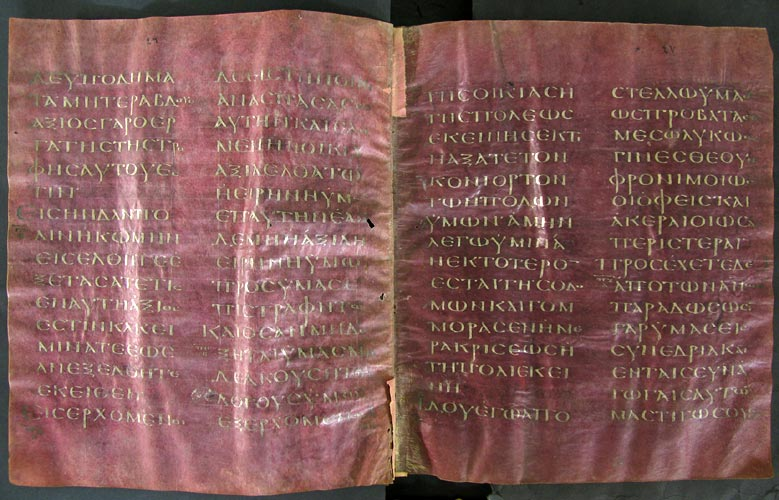
Matthew 10:10–17 on Codex Petropolitanus Purpureus (6th century)

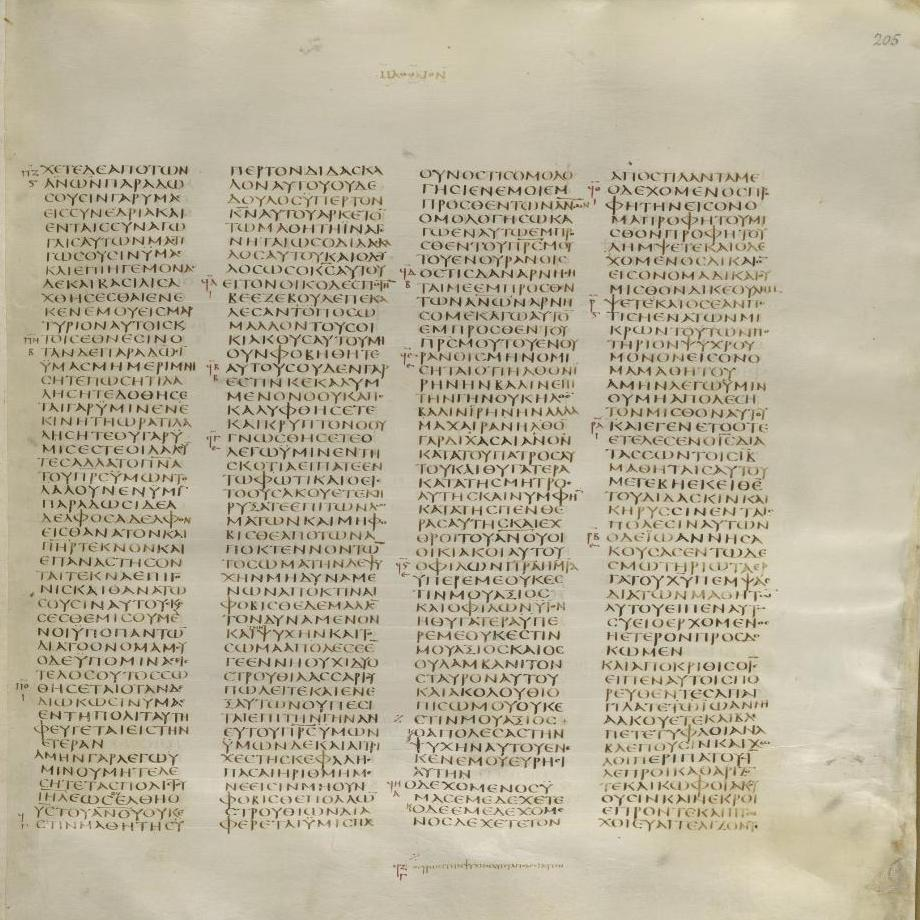
Codex Sinaiticus (AD 330–360), Matthew 10:17–11:15

== The twelve (verses 1–15) ==
The text in verse 1 refers to "his twelve disciples" (Greek: τους δωδεκα μαθητας αυτου, tous dōdeka mathētas autou). Verse 2 calls them "the twelve apostles" (Greek: τῶν δώδεκα ἀποστόλων, tōn dōdeka apostolōn):

²Now the names of the twelve apostles are these: The first, Simon, who is called Peter, and Andrew his brother; James the son of Zebedee, and John his brother; ³Philip, and Bartholomew; Thomas, and Matthew the publican; James the son of Alphaeus, and Lebbaeus, whose surname was Thaddaeus; ⁴Simon the Canaanite, and Judas Iscariot, who also betrayed him.

— King James Version

Verse 5 refers to them simply as "the twelve" (Greek: τοὺς δώδεκα, tous dōdeka) but the verb which follows is "ἀπέστειλεν" (apesteilen), meaning "sent forth". Dale Allison observes that they are implicitly called "to imitate Jesus the missionary". Peter is named first because he would go on to lead the church. Judas is named last, because he was the most dishonoured.

== Verses 17–39 ==
The Jerusalem Bible refers to these verses as a "missionary's handbook", and suggests that their scope is wider than that of the "first mission of the apostles" in verses 1–16.

=== Verse 34 ===
"Think not that I am come to send peace on earth: I came not to send [or bring] peace, but a sword."

This is a much-discussed passage, often explained in terms of the "apocalyptic-eschatological" context of the 1st century.

R. T. France explains the verse, in context with the subsequent verse 35: "The sword Jesus brings is not here military conflict, but, as vv. 35–36 show, a sharp social division which even severs the closest family ties. … Jesus speaks here, as in the preceding and following verses, more of a division in men’s personal response to him."

The text of Matthew's Gospel in the Book of Kells alters gladium, the Vulgate translation of makhairan "sword", to gaudium, "joy", resulting in a reading of "I came not [only] to bring peace, but [also] joy".

=== Verse 38 ===
And he who does not take his cross and follow after Me is not worthy of Me.

- "Take his cross": is in the sense of "willingly to undergo the severe trials that fall to his lot" (2 Corinthians 1:5; Philippians 3:10); a figurative expression taken from the practice that "condemned criminals were compelled to take up their own cross and carry it to the place of execution" (Matthew 27:32; Luke 23:26; John 19:16). (Note: Also in Artemid. ii. 56, p. 153; Plut. Mor. p. 554 A; Cic. de divin. i. 26; Valer. Max. xi. 7. apud Meyer's NT, Matthew 10:38)

== Parallels in the Gospel of Thomas ==
Matthew 10 contains many parallels found in the Gospel of Thomas.

- Matthew 10:16 parallels saying 39 in the Gospel of Thomas.
- Matthew 10:37 parallels sayings 55 and 101
- Matthew 10:27b parallels saying 33a.
- Matthew 10:34–36 parallels saying 16.
- Matthew 10:26 parallels saying 5b.

== See also ==
- Commissioning of the Twelve Apostles
- Coming Persecutions
