= Leibzoll =

Tax on Jews in Europe

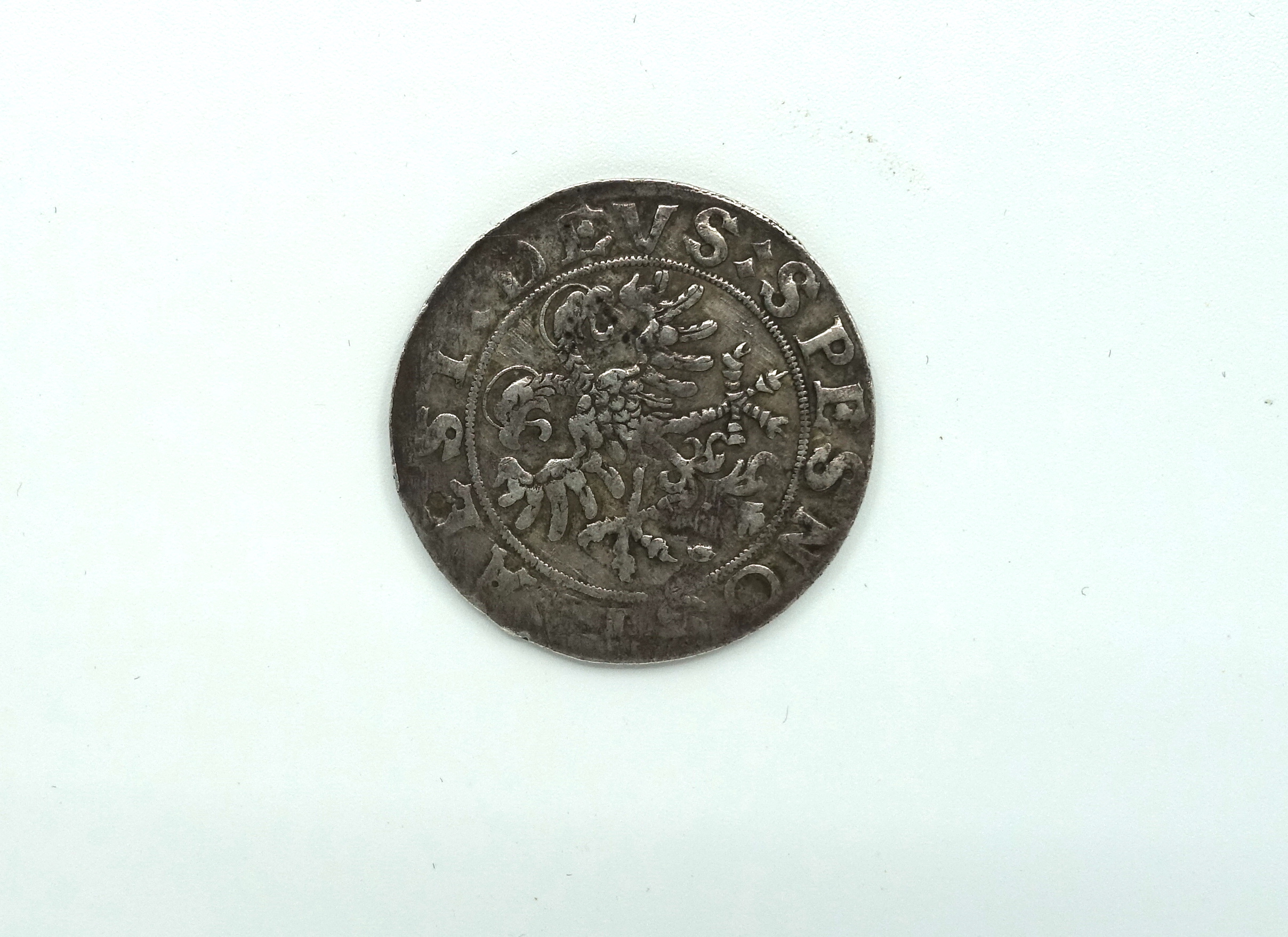
Schaffhausen Dicken coin from 1617. It corresponds to the Leibzoll of 24 kreuzers that Jews had to pay from 1676 onwards to stay in Schaffhausen. Coin in the collection of the Jewish Museum of Switzerland.

The Leibzoll (German: "body tax") was a special toll that Jews had to pay in most European states from the Middle Ages to the 19th century.

== Rate of the toll ==
The origin of the Leibzoll may be traced to the political position of the Jews in Germany, where they were considered crown property and, therefore, under the king's protection. In his capacity as Holy Roman emperor the king claimed the exclusive rights of the jurisdiction and taxation of the Jews, and retained responsibility for the protection of their lives and their property. He granted them protection either by a guard or by safe-conduct; chiefly by the latter, for the Jews, being extensive travelers, when they went on long business trips could not always be accompanied by imperial guards. The first instance of the granting of one of these safe-conducts occurred under Louis le Débonnaire (814–840), and a specimen of it may be found among the documents preserved in the "Liber Formularum" of that period. According to this document the king grants freedom of travel and exemption from all taxes to three Jews of Lyons "neque teloneum, neque paravereda aut mansionaticum, aut pulveraticum, aut cespitaticum, aut ripaticum, aut rotaticum, aut portaticum, aut herbaticum prædictis Hebræis exigere præsumant" (De Rozières, "Recueil Général des Formules Usitées dans l'Empire des Francs," i. 41–43, Paris, 1859–1871; Simson, "Jahrbücher des Fränkischen Reiches Unter Ludwig, dem Frommen," i. 393–396, Leipsic, 1874–76). For such a safe-conduct the Jews were required to pay a certain fee; but this, being understood, is not stated anywhere, as the payment constitutes the only reason for the exemption from other taxes. The stipulations regulating the tolls of Raffelstetten, Lorch (Oberösterreich), issued between 904 and 906, are to be interpreted in the same manner—the Jews, as privileged merchants, shall not pay more than the regular toll ("justum theloneum"). The law expressly states this conforms with the ancient custom (Pertz, "Mon. Germaniæ Leges," iii. 480; Georg Waitz, "Deutsche Verfassungsgeschichte", iv. 1, 70, Kiel, 1884; Scherer, "Rechtsverhältnisse der Juden," p. 110, Leipsic, 1901); the same is stated in the charter granted to the Jews of Worms, 1090 ("Zeitschrift für die Gesch. der Juden in Deutschland," i. 139). When the Jews passed under the jurisdiction of the territorial rulers, this principle was acknowledged. Frederick II of Austria, in his law on the Jews, issued 1244, decreed that within the limits of his state they should not pay more than the legal rate of toll—the same rate that all other citizens had to pay (Scherer, l.c. p. 181). As in the stipulations regulating the tolls of Raffelstetten, and as in the law of Frederick II, only customs duties for goods or slaves were mentioned: therefore a personal tax was unknown.

As the Jews in increasing numbers passed under territorial jurisdiction, the exemption from personal tax, which was granted them as long as they remained crown property, was no longer respected, for each territorial ruler considered himself entitled to levy taxes on all foreign Jewish subjects who passed through his territory. But these taxes continued as customs duties until, with the growing hostility of the free cities, and with the frequent expulsion from vast territories which became the rule in the fifteenth century, those rulers who had expelled the Jews from their domains determined on the adoption of a policy of keeping them away from their borders. International relations, however, would not permit of the disregard of a passport granted by a foreign ruler to one of his subjects, so when Jews visited a territory in which no Jew was permitted to settle they were subjected to the payment of a toll.

== Development of Leibzoll ==
Owing to the weakness of the imperial power of the Holy Roman Empire, Jews expelled from a place could easily settle in the vicinity, and on the strength of their passports do business in the place from which they had been expelled. So the Jews expelled from Nuremberg in 1499 settled in Fürth; those expelled from Nördlingen (1507) settled in Kleinerdlingen; those who could not gain entrance into the city of Lübeck settled in the village of Lübeck-Moisling—all places of settlement within easy walking distance of the cities in which they were denied residence. On the passports issued to them by their respective sovereigns they could engage in trade in the latter places, at least during the day, and, therefore, since the local governments wished to enforce the decrees excluding the Jews, they were driven to adopt new measures ("R. E. J." viii. 212). Administrators soon recognized the financial utility of the Leibzoll, and the territorial rulers in the German empire levied such a toll from all traveling Jews, whether foreigners or their own subjects. In Nuremberg the average annual value of the toll for the last ten years during which Leibzoll was levied (1797–1806) was 2,448 florins (Barbeck, "Gesch. der Juden in Nürnberg und Fürth," p. 106, Nuremberg, 1878).

The wording of the laws sometimes also suggests an intention of humiliating the Jews. For example, an ordinance of Philip V of Spain (1703) fixes the toll for a wagon-load of merchandise, one head of cattle, or one Jew, when passing over the bridges of Luxembourg, at four sols ("R. E. J." viii. 208). Sometimes the humiliation lay in the form in which the tax was levied. In some places a Jew passing a toll-gate had to cast dice in remembrance of the crucifixion (Grätz, "Gesch." 3d ed., viii. 14); elsewhere, as in Freiberg, in Saxony, Jews were forced to pay for a guard to follow them as long as they remained within the city. Even after the Leibzoll had been officially abolished, as in Austria by Emperor Joseph II in 1782, Jews entering Vienna or staying there for some time had to pay a special tax which differed from Leibzoll only in name. The same may be said of Nuremberg, where Leibzoll was abolished theoretically in 1800, but was levied practically until 1806 under the name of "Passier- und Eintrittsgeld". In Warsaw, where the French government had emancipated the Jews, the Russian government re-introduced the Leibzoll under the name of "Tagzettel", requiring every Jew entering the city to pay five silver groschen for the first day and three for every additional day he remained ("Allg. Zeit. des Jud." 1862, p. 12).

== Exemptions ==
Certain exemptions from Leibzoll were granted. Under the Austrian law of 1244, corpses were exempt. Albert III, Duke of Austria gave free safe-conduct to three Austrian Jews to bring "etrogim" from Triest free of duty in 1389 (Scherer, l.c. p. 535). The Jews living within the territory of the Elector of Mainz were exempted from Leibzoll when they were traveling to attend one of the regular landtags, or to meetings of the district congregations (see Bamberger, "Histor. Berichte über die Juden der Stadt Aschaffenburg," p. 26, Strasburg, 1900). As a mark of special favor, court Jews or mint-farmers were exempt from the payment of such tolls (see Harburg). Later the exemption was extended to manufacturers; and Hirsch David, velvet-manufacturer of Berlin, was exempted by the king (1731) because his business required him to travel frequently ("Allg. Zeit. des Jud." 1902, p. 477). When Meyerbeer went to Vienna, the "Judenamt" received orders to treat him "not as a Jew, but as a cavalier" (ib. 1847, p. 91). Native Jews were often exempted, for a fixed sum, from paying this toll, but naturally this freed them from it only within the confines of their own country. Thus the Jews of Saxony were exempt from the Leibzoll by an order dated 16 April 1773 (Levy, "Geschichte der Juden in Sachsen," p. 71, Berlin, 1901). The Jews of Berlin compromised with the elector, in 1700, by paying 1,000 ducats annually; this sum ("Jüdische Presse," 22 Aug. 1902) exempted only those who were in the possession of a lawful charter ("Schutzbrief"), which had replaced the old safe-conduct ("Judengeleit"), and who therefore were called "vergleitete Juden" or escorted Jews.

In December, 1787, Frederick William II of Prussia abolished the Leibzoll in Berlin, and in July, 1788, he abolished it in other places. The abolition of the toll was due largely to the exertions of David Friedländer. In 1791 the Bishop of Salzburg also abolished the toll in his own dominions.

Notwithstanding the liberal spirit which these abolitions showed, the majority of the German states still clung to the tax. With the advent of the French, however, some of them were compelled to abolish the Leibzoll. Early in July, 1798, the French general Cacatte informed the members of the government at Nassau-Usingen that, at the order of the division commander Freitag, the special taxes of the Jews were to be abolished, as they were repugnant to justice and humanity. In consequence of this order the Jews on the left bank of the Rhine were relieved from the payment of Leibzoll. At the conclusion of the peace of Lunéville (21 July 1801) the toll was re-imposed.

== Wolf Breidenbach ==
At the beginning of the nineteenth century, the Jews of Germany found a courageous champion in Wolf Breidenbach, who worked persistently for the abolition of this impost. Perceiving that ample resources would be required to carry on his campaign, and not being personally able to command these, he invoked the aid of the German and foreign Jews in 1803, asking them to subscribe to the fund raised for this purpose. He instituted negotiations with the minor German princes at the Diet of Ratisbon (1804), and, aided by Dalberg, the imperial chancellor, succeeded in obtaining free passage for the Jews throughout the Rhine provinces and Bavaria. It was largely due to his efforts that the Leibzoll was abolished in Kurhessen, Hohenlohe, Neuwied, Wied-Runkel, Braunfels, Solms-Rödelheim, and also in Nassau (September, 1806). The emancipation of the Jews from these imposts created much antagonism; and among those opposed to it were such men as Paalzow, Grattenauer, and Buchholz. In the northern Hanse towns the French garrisons compelled the burghers to relieve the Jews from the payment of the Leibzoll, and, notwithstanding much opposition, secured the privilege for the Jews of Hamburg, Lübeck, and Bremen. The Leibzoll was abolished in Brunswick-Lüneburg 23 April 1823, through the efforts of Israel Jacobson, court agent to the Duke of Brunswick. Although the tax had been almost universally abolished, its collection still continued from the Jews visiting Vienna in the reign (1804–1835) of Francis I of Austria. Of the German states, Saxony was the last to abolish it.

== Switzerland ==
In the area of today's Switzerland, as in the surrounding regions, Jews were subjected to the costly and humiliating practice of paying the body tax (Leibzoll), particularly between the 17th and 18th century. Furthermore, Jews paid higher taxes for their wares, often double the regular fee.

Zürich was particularly strict, as shown by a ruling from 1675, which only allowed “Jew horses” to cross Zürich territory, while Jews should not set foot on land. For their horses to cross Zürich soil, Jews had to pay double the usual toll rate.

The Jew toll in Schaffhausen was valued at 24 Kreuzer in 1676. For that sum, Jews were allowed to stay two days in the city and practice trade, as long as all trading was done in cash.

Authorities often profited from the Leibzoll. In Basel, the money was collected by the Oberstknecht. The Jewish community of Basel had grown to over 700 families in the 18th century, and in 1723, the lump sum of the Leibzoll amounted to approximately 500 pounds.

In 1797, under the ruling of Napoleon, the Helvetic Consulta abolished the Jew toll.

In Schaffhausen, it took a further two years for these tolls to be abolished, and the local council decided to maintain the Leibzoll for non-French Jews. In 1804, in a similar vein, the Small Council of Fribourg made a ruling to levy higher bridge tolls for all Jews who were not French citizens. From these examples, it is clear that although the Leibzoll was officially abolished in 1797, extra rates and tolls persisted in areas that were hostile to Jews. Swiss rules and policies restrictive to Jews remained in place well into the 19th century.

== Russia ==
Up to 1862, the Polish Jews visiting Russia were treated as foreigners, and as such were not admitted into the interior of the empire. On the other hand, the Russian Jews had great difficulty in entering Poland, and those who went there for business had to pay a "Geleitzoll." In 1826, the representatives of the Jewish community of Kovno petitioned the government for the abolition of the tax, which amounted then to fifteen Polish florins. By order of Emperor Nicholas I this application was referred to the Grand Duke Constantine Pavlovich, then Viceroy of Poland, who stated that he considered the abolition of the tax inexpedient, but proposed decreasing its amount and regulating it according to age, sex, and business occupation. He deemed it advisable to introduce a similar tax in Russia, and suggested that each Polish Jew entering Russia, and each Russian Jew entering Poland, should be supplied with a pass descriptive of the place of its issuance, the bearer's business, etc. The local police was to be charged with the inspection of the passes. In consequence of this report, Emperor Nicholas ordered the minister of finance to communicate with the proper authorities, and to draft the regulations for the introduction of the tax in question. After a prolonged correspondence with the Polish authorities the minister found the proposed measure to be inexpedient, not only because of the decrease in the revenues which it would effect, but also because of possible complications and abuses in its enforcement. The "Geleitzoll", therefore, remained until abolished by an ukase of 24 May 1862.

== Similar taxes elsewhere ==
- Other taxes mainly or exclusively targeting Jews:
  - Beard tax
  - Diploma tax
  - Jewish poll tax
  - Jewish tax
  - Kosher tax
  - Rabbi tax
  - Temple tax
  - Tolerance tax
  - Wealth tax

== See also ==
- Blood money laws
- Cantonist recruitment
- Caste system
- Court Jew
- Danegeld
- Devşirme system
- Dazdie
- Ghetto
- More Judaico
- Jizya tax
- Judenhut
- Judenrat
- Protection money
- Tallage
- Shtadlan
- Useful Jew
- Yellow badge
