= Fiscus Judaicus =

Tax imposed on Jews in the Roman Empire

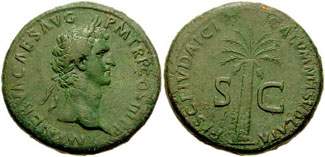
A coin issued by Nerva reads fisci Judaici calumnia sublata, "abolition of malicious prosecution in connection with the Jewish tax"

The fiscus Iudaicus or fiscus Judaicus (Latin for 'Jewish tax') was a tax imposed on Jews in the Roman Empire after the destruction of Jerusalem and its Temple in AD 70.

The fiscus Iudaicus replaced the traditional half-shekel Temple tax which had been paid annually by Jews for the maintenance of the Temple in Jerusalem. The new poll tax redirected those funds to the reconstruction of the Temple of Jupiter Optimus Maximus in Rome, which had been destroyed during the Year of the Four Emperors. The redirection of these funds represented a significant humiliation for the Jewish population of the empire. The tax continued even after the Capitoline Temple was rebuilt, contributing to Roman finances and serving as a deterrent against proselytism and conversion to Judaism.

Under Domitian, the enforcement of the tax became stringent. Suetonius recounts that the tax was then applied to those who denied their Jewish origin or practiced Jewish customs without identifying as Jewish, and describes an incident where a 90-year-old man was examined to confirm if he was circumcised. Tax receipts found in Egypt indicate that even children were liable for this tax. Later (96–98 CE), Nerva introduced reforms that eased some of the tax's burdens but did not abolish it entirely.

== Contemporary sources ==
Modern knowledge of the Fiscus Judaicus is found in four primary sources:

- A passage from The Jewish War by Josephus
- A passage from The Twelve Caesars by Suetonius
- A passage from the Roman History by Cassius Dio
- Seventy-one Roman Egyptian tax receipts.

The tax receipts from Egypt date from 70 CE to 116 CE, with the tax ceasing during the Diaspora Revolt, which led to widespread suppression and the near-total annihilation of Egyptian Jewry.

== Imposition ==
The tax was initially imposed by Roman emperor Vespasian as one of the measures against Jews as a result of the First Roman-Jewish War, or first Jewish revolt of AD 66–73. The tax was imposed on all Jews throughout the empire, not just on those who took part in the revolt against Rome. The tax was imposed after the destruction of the Second Temple in AD 70 in place of the levy (or tithe) payable by Jews towards the upkeep of the Temple. The amount levied was two denarii, equivalent to the one-half of a shekel that observant Jews had previously paid for the upkeep of the Temple of Jerusalem. The tax was to go instead to the Temple of Capitoline Jupiter, the major center of ancient Roman religion. The Fiscus Judaicus was a humiliation for the Jews. In Rome, a special procurator known as procurator ad capitularia Iudaeorum was responsible for the collection of the tax. Only those who had abandoned Judaism were exempt from paying it. According to Shmuel Safrai, the Romans believed that conquering a nation also subjected its gods, justifying their claim to the revenue of Israel's temple as spoils of victory.

While the tax paid for the Temple of Jerusalem was payable only by adult men between the ages of 20 and 50, the fiscus Iudaicus was imposed on all Jews, including women, children, and elderly—and even Jewish slaves. In Egypt, the documentary evidence (in the form of receipts) confirms the payment of the tax by women and children. The oldest person known from these receipts to have paid the Fiscus Judaicus was a 61-year-old woman, which led Sherman LeRoy Wallace to conjecture that the tax was levied only until age 62, as was the regular Roman poll tax paid by individuals throughout the empire. The tax was continued even after the completion of the reconstruction of the Capitoline temple for its upkeep.

== Domitian ==
Domitian, who ruled between 81 and 96, expanded the Fiscus Judaicus to include not only born Jews and converts to Judaism, but also those who concealed the fact that they were Jews or observed Jewish customs. Suetonius relates that when he was young, an old man of 90 was examined to see whether he was circumcised, which shows that during this period the tax was levied even on those above age 62. Louis Feldman argues that the increased harshness was caused by the success of the Jewish (and possibly Christian) proselytism.

Domitian applied the tax even to those who merely "lived like Jews":

Besides other taxes, that on the Jews [A tax of two drachmas a head, imposed by Vespasian; see Josephus, Bell. Jud. 7.218] was levied with the utmost rigor, and those were prosecuted who, without publicly acknowledging that faith, yet lived as Jews, as well as those who concealed their origin and did not pay the tribute levied upon their people [These may have been Christians, whom the Romans commonly assumed were Jews]. I recall being present in my youth when the person of a man ninety years old was examined before the procurator and a very crowded court, to see whether he was circumcised. [c. 90]

Domitian's ruling opened the door to possibilities of blackmail in Rome and in all Italy. Charges of following Judaism were easily made but difficult to disprove, not least because the practices of certain philosophical sects resembled some Jewish customs. As a result, many people chose to settle with the accusers out of court rather than risk the uncertainties of judicial hearings, thus effectively encouraging the blackmailers. Titus Flavius Clemens was put to death for "living a Jewish life" or "drifting into Jewish ways" in 95, which may well have been related to the administration of the Fiscus Judaicus under Domitian.

== Schism between Judaism and Christianity ==
The Fiscus Judaicus was originally imposed on Jews. At the time likely neither the Romans nor the Christians considered Christianity to be separate from Judaism. If anything they would have considered themselves as a Jewish sect. Jewish and non-Jewish Christians would therefore be liable to the tax, Marius Heemstra argues.

However, in 96 Domitian's successor Nerva reformed the administration of fiscus Iudaicus and redefined Judaism as a religion, furthering the distinction between Judaism and Christianity. This paved the way for the Roman persecution of Christians that began a few years later and continued until the Edict of Milan in 313. The coins of Nerva bear the legend fisci Iudaici calumnia sublata "abolition of malicious prosecution in connection with the Jewish tax", in reference to his reform of the harsh policies of Domitian.

== Abolition ==
It remains unclear when the Fiscus Judaicus was abolished. Documentary evidence confirms the collection of the tax in the middle of the 2nd century, and literary sources indicate that the tax was still in existence in the early 3rd century. Some historians credit the emperor Julian with its abolition in about 361 or 362.

== Medieval revival ==
The tax was revived in the Middle Ages in 1342 under the name of Opferpfennig ['sacrifice penny'] by the Holy Roman Emperors. The Opferpfennig (originally Guldenpfennig) tax was introduced in 1342 by Emperor Louis IV the Bavarian, who ordered all Jews above age 12 and possessing 20 gulden to pay one gulden annually for protection. The practice was justified on the grounds that the emperor, as the legal successor of the Roman emperors, was the rightful recipient of the Temple tax. The Opferpfennig was collected on Christmas Day. Emperor Charles IV later ordered the income of the Opferpfennig tax to be delivered to the archbishop of Trier. This tax was at some places replaced by an overall communal tax.

== See also ==
- Jewish poll tax
- Jizya
- Leibzoll
- Rabbi tax
- Sicaricon
- Tolerance tax
