= Judenvermögensabgabe =

Tax on Jews in Nazi Germany

The Judenvermögensabgabe ("Jewish Capital Levy") was an arbitrary special tax imposed on German Jews under the Nazi dictatorship. The tax was only a part of a larger series of actions taken by the Nazis to systematically plunder Jewish assets.

After the assassination of the German Legation Secretary Ernst Eduard vom Rath and the November pogroms in 1938, Hermann Göring demanded a contribution payment of one billion Reichsmark (ℛ︁ℳ︁) as "atonement" for "the hostile attitude of Judaism towards the German people". The decree of 12 November 1938 on the expiation of Jews of German nationality (RGBl. I p. 1579) was signed by Hermann Göring, who had been granted a general power of attorney in 1936 to issue ordinances.

On the same day, the "Ordinance on the Elimination of Jews from German Economic Life" and the "Ordinance on the Restoration of the Street Image in Jewish Commercial Operations" were issued, followed three weeks later by the "Ordinance on the Use of Jewish wealth".

== Realizations ==
Adolf Hitler had already considered a comparable penalty tax in 1936 after the assassination of Wilhelm Gustloff, to which a "plan to raise a special Jewish tax approved in principle" and had a law drawn up which was to be announced immediately after the Gustloff trial. In August 1936, Hitler proclaimed in a "secret memorandum on the Four-Year Plan" that, in order to achieve Germany's military policy goals, a law was to be enacted, among other things, "which makes all Judaism liable for all damage caused by individual incidents of this criminality to the German economy and therefore to the German people". On 18 December of the same year, Wilhelm Stuckart, State Secretary in the Reich Ministry of the Interior, confidentially informed Reich Economics Minister Hjalmar Schacht that Hitler had "in principle approved the raising of a Jewish tax" and ordered "to accelerate the preparations of a corresponding draft law in such a way that it would be possible to already promulgate the law after the end of the Gustloff trial". These plans prospered up to a bill which imposed special surcharges on all Jews for the accounting year 1937 on wage and property taxes. For foreign policy reasons, however, but also because of the ministerial bureaucracies reservations, Hitler refrained from implementation "obviously with the intention of waiting for a more favorable situation".

On 10 November 1938, Reich Economics Minister Walther Funk learned from Joseph Goebbels that Hitler ordered to eliminate all Jews from the German economy. On the same day, Göring and Goebbels met with Hitler, and Goebbels suggested that a contribution be imposed on the Jews. Göring assured the International Military Tribunal at the Nuremberg Trial against the main war criminals that Hitler was also behind the goal of the other laws enacted shortly thereafter:

"I would like to stress that although I had written order and order, oral as well as written, from the leader to carry out and enact these laws, I take the full responsibility for these laws signed by me, because I have enacted them and am therefore responsible for them and do not think of hiding behind the [sic] order of the leader in any form."

— Hermann Göring,

In a "Discussion on the Jewish Question" lasting several hours on 12 November 1938, Göring outlined the goal in front of more than a hundred participants, "to come to a very clear action profitable for the Reich" pertaining to the Jewish question. The damage caused by the pogrom was to be repaired by the Jews themselves; insurance benefits were confiscated. Jewish business enterprises were to be expropriated at an estimated value and transferred to German buyers at market value. Shares and securities had to be exchanged for Reich Treasury notes. Göring said during this meeting:

"I will choose the wording that the German Jews in their entirety will be imposed a contribution of 1 billion as punishment for the nefarious crimes, etc., etc. That'll work. The bastards won't do a second murder that fast. By the way, I have to say once again: I don't want to be a Jew in Germany."

— Göring,

== Implementation ==
Already in the spring of 1938 a decree had been issued on the registration of the property of Jews. Jews had to declare their assets by the end of July if the value exceeded 5,000 ℛ︁ℳ︁. A decree of 21 November 1938 (RGBl. I p. 1638 f.) on the expiation of the Jews made use of this and determined that all Jews with assets of more than 5,000 ℛ︁ℳ︁ had to pay 20% of it in four instalments to their tax office by 15 August 1939. The ordinance expressly reserved the right to demand further payments if the total sum of one billion Reichsmark was not reached in this way. In fact, another decree demanded a fifth instalment, which became due on 15 November 1939. The total sum finally amounted to 1,126,612,495.00 ℛ︁ℳ︁.

Fiscal year	Tax revenue in ℛ︁ℳ︁
1938	498.514.808
1939	533.126.504
1940	94.971.184
total:	1.126.612.496

== Financial policy background ==
The financial plight of the Reich had worsened – not least because of the armament of the Wehrmacht. There was a lack of foreign currency and loans from abroad; for the year 1939 the repayment of Mefo bills was due. There was a considerable gap in the budget: In 1938 there was a cash deficit of two billion Reichsmarks. In mid-November 1938, Walther Bayrhoffer of the Reich Ministry of Finance feared "the possibility that the Reich might become insolvent". A representative of the Foreign Office noted after an internal speech by Göring on 18 November 1938:

"Very critical state of the Reich's finances. This was first remedied by the billions imposed on the Jewish community and by the Reich's profits from the aryanization of Jewish enterprises."

The financial squeeze that the German state was in in November became apparent from the fact that the urgently awaited fines from the "Jewish Penalty" were pre-financed with the help of major German banks. 1 billion Reichsmark increased Reich revenue from 16 to 17 billion marks in one fell swoop, i.e. by a good 6 percent.

== Reactions ==
Victor Klemperer writes in his diaries of 13 November 1938 and 6 December:

"In Leipzig we also experienced the billion-dollar fine that the German people had issued the Jews. [...] In the property tax, on the other hand, we seem to benefit from our poverty. [...] I (will) probably be below the 5,000 mark limit, because the surrender value of the life insurance will only be a few hundred marks, and the current value of the house will be barely 17,000, of which 12,000 are mortgages."

In fact, only a fraction of the Jews remaining in Germany paid this penalty tax. In Hamburg, for example, only 16 percent had had to submit a declaration of assets, which was used as the basis for the Jewish wealth tax.

According to the secret domestic political reports raised by the Security Service, parts of the population criticized the senseless destruction of material assets during the "Reichskristallnacht". In contrast, the fine imposed on the Jews was in many cases considered a fair punishment. The Bamberger Volksblatt described the alleged wealth of the Jews and justified the "atonement": "This property taken from the German people by fraud is to a small extent returned to the possession of the German people through the fine now imposed".

== Repayment ==
Following the war, the American occupation forces issued "Military Government Law No. 59; Restitution of Identifiable Property", which ordered the payment of restitution to people who were wrongly deprived of their property and assets. The German Restitution Laws passed in 1953 included limitations and unfavorable calculations in § 21, which were lifted in the revision of 1956 in § 59. The refund payments were part of a larger program of Wiedergutmachung, also including repayments of the Reich Flight Tax.

== See also ==
- Reich Flight Tax
- Taxation of the Jews in Europe
- Varlık Vergisi (lit. "wealth tax"), in 1942 in Turkey
