= Adam Almiliby =

Adam Almiliby was a Portuguese Jew who, together with Isaac Belamy, was appointed a farmer of the royal taxes in 1353 by King Alfonso IV. By virtue of this office both were exempted from wearing the Jew-badge, and were endowed with power to enforce the collection of the royal customs. During their term of office the Jews of Portugal were relieved of all imposts except the poll-tax.
