= Tallage =

Medieval English land tax

Tallage or talliage (from the French tailler, i.e. a part cut out of the whole) may have signified at first any tax, but became in England and France a land use or land tenure tax. Later in England it was further limited to assessments by the crown upon cities, boroughs, and royal domains. In effect, tallage was a land tax.

== England ==
Land taxes were not unknown in England, as the Anglo-Saxon kings had periodically levied a Danegeld on that basis, but tallage was brought to England by the Normans as a feudal duty. The word first appeared in the reign of Henry II as a synonym for the auxilium burgi, which was an occasional payment exacted by king and barons. Under Henry's sons it became a common source of royal revenue. It was condemned in the Magna Carta of 1215, and its imposition practically ceased by 1283 in favour of a general grant made in Parliament. There were three further attempts to impose tallage, and it was formally abolished in England in 1340 (Taxation, etc. Act 1340) under Edward III, when Parliament's consent to the imposition of common charges became required.

Like scutage, tallage was superseded by various property and trade taxes, and then the subsidy system in the 14th century, which involved poll taxes. The last occasion on which tallage was levied in England appears to be about the year 1332.

A Statute Concerning Tallage (1297)
- Act of Parliament
- Parliament of England
- Long title: Statutum de Tallagio non concedendo
- Citation: 25 Edw. 1
- Territorial extent: England and Wales; Ireland

Dates
- Royal assent: 1297
- Commencement: 1297

Other legislation
- Amended by: Statute Law Revision Act 1887; Statute Law (Repeals) Act 1969
- Relates to: Magna Carta (1297); Charter of the Forest; Confirmation of the Charters (1297); Bill of Rights 1689

Status: Amended

Text of statute as originally enacted

Revised text of statute as amended

Text of the A Statute Concerning Tallage (1297) as in force today (including any amendments) within the United Kingdom, from legislation.gov.uk.

The famous statute of 25 Edw. 1 (34 Edw. 1. Stat. 4 in The Statutes at Large), De Tallagio non Concedendo, though it is printed among the statutes of the realm, and was cited as a statute in the preamble to the Petition of Right in 1628, and by the judges in John Hampden's case in 1637, is probably an imperfect and unauthoritative abstract of the Confirmatio Cartarum. The first section reads:

No Tallage or Aid shall be taken or levied by Us or our Heirs in our Realm, without the good will and Assent of the Archbishops, Bishops, Earls, Barons, Knights, Burgesses, and other Freemen of the Land.

=== Tally sticks ===
Tallagium facere was the technical term for rendering accounts in the Exchequer, the accounts being kept by means of tallies or notched sticks. The tellers (a corruption of talliers) of the Exchequer were at one time important financial officers.

The system of keeping the national accounts by tallies was abolished by the Receipt of the Exchequer Act 1783 (23 Geo. 3. c. 82) and the office of teller by the Offices of Exchequer Act 1817 (57 Geo. 3. c. 84).

=== Tallage and Jews ===
The tax was frequently levied on English Jews during the twelfth and thirteenth centuries. A tallage of £60,000, known as the "Saladin tallage", was levied at Guildford in 1189, the ostensible object being preparation for the Third Crusade.

It was reported that John may have imposed a tallage upon Jews in 1210 to the extent of 60,000 marks (£40,000). There are likewise records of tallages under Henry III of 4,000 marks (1225) and 5,000 marks (1270). Important tallages were made by Edward I in the second, third and fourth years (£1,000) and in the fifth year (25,000 marks) of his reign. These taxes were in addition to the various claims which were made upon Jews for relief, wardship, marriage, fines, law-proceedings, debts, licenses, amercements etc. and which Jews paid to the English exchequer, like other English subjects.

It has been claimed that after their expulsion from England in 1290, the loss of the income from Jews was a chief reason why Edward I was obliged to give up his right of tallage upon Englishmen.

== France ==
Tallage lasted much longer in France, where it was a royal tax and one of estate owners with tenants. It came to be called 'taille' and was much used during the Hundred Years' War. It was not abolished in France until the French Revolution.

== Germany ==
Tallage never became significantly developed in the German states. It remained a small tax owed to a feudal lord in lieu of other feudal duties, dying out along with other feudal duties.

== See also ==
- Danegeld
- Dazdie
- Leibzoll
- Taille

== Bibliography ==
- Fuller, E. A. (1895). "The Tallage of 6 Edward II., and the Bristol Rebellion" (PDF). Transactions of the Bristol and Gloucestershire Archaeological Society. 19: 171–278.
