= Sarah of Würzburg =

Sarah (or Sara) of Würzburg was a Jewish physician active in the Duchy of Franconia in the early 15th century.

Sarah had practiced medicine for at least three years when, in the spring of 1419, Bishop John II of Würzburg licensed her to practice medicine for another three years in return for the annual payment of a tax of ten florins, fee of two florins and two gold pence. The licence stipulated "that she may practice her profession without interference on our part or of those belonging to us, unconditionally, and should anyone intend to prosecute her or actually do so, against such a one we shall take action to the best of our ability so that it be stopped, unconditionally."

Sarah's practice was successful enough that within a few years she was able to purchase an estate in the duchy from the nobleman Friedrich von Riedern. In a letter confirming this transaction and issued by the bishop's judge, Reinhardt of Masspach, she is referred to as "Sarah the Jewess, the doctoress of Würzburg".
