= Reich Flight Tax =

Punitive Nazi tax on emigrating Jews

The Reich Flight Tax (German: Reichsfluchtsteuer) was a German capital control law implemented in 1931 to stem capital flight from the Weimar Republic. After seizing power, the Nazis used the law to prevent emigrants from moving money out of the country and to confiscate any remaining assets from Jews fleeing persecution.

The law was created through decree on 8 December 1931 by Reichspräsident Paul von Hindenburg. The Reich Flight Tax was assessed upon departure from the individual's German domicile, provided that the individual had assets exceeding 200,000 ℛ︁ℳ︁ or had a yearly income over 20,000 ℛ︁ℳ︁. The tax rate was initially set at 25 percent. In 1931, the Reichsmark was fixed at an exchange rate of 4.20 ℛ︁ℳ︁ per dollar, making 200,000 ℛ︁ℳ︁ equal to US$47,600 (equivalent to $1,010,000 in 2025).

In Nazi Germany, the use of the Reich Flight Tax shifted away from dissuading wealthy citizens from moving overseas and was instead used as a form of "legalized theft" to confiscate Jewish assets. The departure of Jewish citizens was desired and permitted by the Nazi government – even after the Invasion of Poland – until a decree from Heinrich Himmler forbade Jewish emigration on 23 October 1941. The tax was steadily increased and used as a "partial expropriation" to seize the assets of Jewish refugees who were persecuted and driven to flee their homeland.

== Historical background ==
The Great Depression of 1929 led to massive loan recalls by the international banking system; this particularly affected Germany, which had an estimated foreign debt of 24 billion ℛ︁ℳ︁ in 1931, of which 5.25 billion ℛ︁ℳ︁ alone had to be repaid in the first half of the year. The German government limited free capital flows and controlled the exchange of foreign currency, while also implementing austerity measures and raising the income tax. These measures precipitated a wave of capital flight, and the Reich Flight Tax was intended to dissuade wealthy would-be emigrants from leaving the country.

The idea of penalizing "unpatriotic desertion" (relocation overseas to avoid taxation) was not new. In 1918, the German government had passed the "Law against tax evasion" (German: Gesetz gegen die Steuerflucht, Reichsgesetzblatt I, p. 951) which was repealed in 1925.

Because of the increasingly precarious and dysfunctional parliamentary government in the final years of the Weimar Republic, a series of emergency decrees were issued in lieu of normal legislating through parliamentary procedure.

== Decree of 8 December 1931 ==
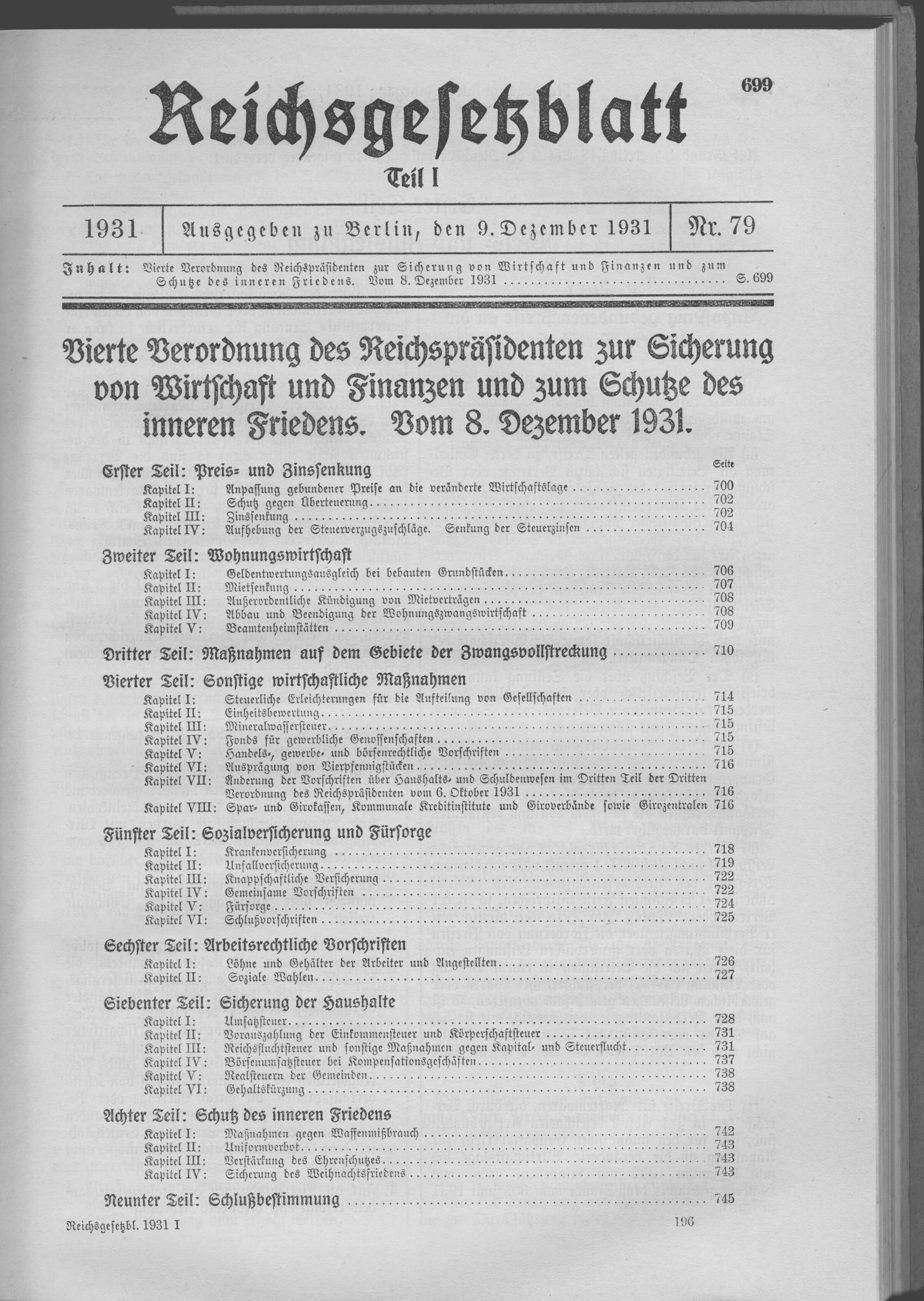
The emergency decree of 8 December 1931.

The Reich Flight Tax was one of many other measures implemented by the "Fourth Decree of the Reich President on the Protection of the Economy and Finance and on the Defense of Civil Peace" (German: Vierte Verordnung des Reichspräsidenten zur Sicherung von Wirtschaft und Finanzen und zum Schutze des inneren Friedens, published in the Reichsgesetzblatt 1931 I, pp. 699–745.): there were also regulations on prices, interest rates, the housing industry, social insurance, labor law, and financial rules, as well as gun control regulations and the forbidding of uniformed bodies.

As a temporary "Measure Against Capital Flight and Tax Evasion", individuals who were citizens of Germany as of 31 March 1929 and had moved or would move their residence abroad before 31 December 1932, the tax would be assessed, provided the emigrant had taxable assets in excess of 200,000 ℛ︁ℳ︁ or an annual income over 20,000 ℛ︁ℳ︁. The tax rate was set at 25% of total assets or income and was also applied retroactively.

Taxable persons who attempted to evade this penalty could be punished with no less than three months imprisonment and an unlimited fine. The names of those abroad who evaded this penalty were listed in a "Tax wanted poster" published in the Deutscher Reichsanzeiger, and were to be arrested in the event of a visit to Germany. Any assets in Germany belonging to tax evaders who had moved overseas were seized.

The law was enacted to expire at the end of the year 1932 but that year it was extended to 31 December 1934 (Reichsgesetzblatt I, p. 572).

== Nazi Germany ==
The existing decree assessing the tax was substantially changed with the "Law Concerning Revision of the Specifications of the Reich Flight Tax" (German: Gesetz über Änderung der Vorschriften über die Reichsfluchtsteuer), issued 18 May 1934 (RGBl. 1934 I, pp. 392–393), and was extended six times before being amended on 9 December 1942 (RGBl. I, p. 682) to remain in force indefinitely.

A major change included in the 1934 revisions was the lower limit for taxable assets was decreased from 200,000 ℛ︁ℳ︁ to 50,000 ℛ︁ℳ︁ (equivalent to $286,000 in 2025). The assessment means were also changed to the detriment of the would-be emigrant. As such, a much larger group of people were targeted by the tax. The tax, which was originally aimed at those who voluntarily sought to reduce their tax burden by moving overseas, instead affected primarily the Jews who wished to leave their homeland due to well-justified fears of violence, incarceration, and occupational limitations.

Prior to the Machtergreifung in 1933, the funds raised through the Reich Flight Tax were comparably small, amounting to just under 1 million ℛℳ in 1932. After the Nazi Party came to power in 1933, the wave of refugees – caused by the government's rapidly escalating persecution of Jews – made up a substantial part of the government's finances. In 1933, the tax raised 17 million ℛ︁ℳ︁, eventually reaching a peak of 342 million ℛ︁ℳ︁ in 1938. In total, the Nazi government collected 941 million ℛ︁ℳ︁ in taxes through the Reich Flight Tax – equivalent to 4 billion USD in 2019. An estimated 90% of these funds came from emigrants persecuted for religious or racial reasons.

== Implementation ==
In order to legally emigrate, a "tax clearance certificate" (German: Unbedenklichkeitsbescheinigung) was required from the Tax Authority, certifying the payment of the Reich Flight Tax and other taxes. When individuals were suspected of intentions to emigrate, the Exchange Control Office of the Tax Authority could require a security deposit equivalent to the amount of the tax. A tight surveillance net was created to discover persons planning to flee the country: the Reichspost tracked change of address orders by Jews; freight companies were required to report moves; notaries reported sales of real estate; life insurance companies were required to report cancellations of life insurance. The Gestapo surveiled the letter and telephone correspondence of suspected individuals.

Even after paying the tax, it was not guaranteed that an individual could leave the country with his or her remaining property. The exemption limit for foreign exchanges was set at 10 ℛ︁ℳ︁. Bank deposits and security holdings were moved into frozen accounts, from which funds could only be transferred abroad with the payment of high penalties. The percentage of the funds confiscated increased over time:

- January 1934: 20%
- August 1934: 65%
- October 1936: 81%
- June 1938: 90%
- September 1939: 96%

== Repeal ==
The laws were repealed through the "Law for Repeal of Obsolete Tax Regulations" on 23 July 1953 (Bundessteuerblatt 1953 I, p. 276). A replacement law that was discussed in the cabinet was not introduced in the Bundestag, as various measures against capital flight were already in place through the overseeing allied powers.

== Repayment ==
The American-issued "Military Government Law No. 59; Restitution of Identifiable Property" ordered the repayment of the Reich Flight Tax, insofar as the payments could be linked to emigration of persecuted peoples. The German Restitution Laws passed in 1953 included limitations and unfavorable calculations in § 21, which were lifted in the revision of 1956 in § 59. The refund payments were part of a larger program of Wiedergutmachung, also including repayments of the Judenvermögensabgabe ("Jewish Capital Levy").

== See also ==
- Aryanization
- Expatriation tax
- Haavara Agreement
- Diploma tax
- Nuremberg Laws
- Law for the Restoration of the Professional Civil Service
- Aryan Paragraph
- Ahnenpass
