= Hiberna =

Hiberna in the Polish–Lithuanian Commonwealth, also known as "chleb zimowy" (winter bread), was an obligation to guarantee accommodation for troops during winter time. It was an obligation of Królewszczyzna (crown lands) and church estates. Initially it was paid in kind, in 1649-1652 it was a targeted tax to support the troops collected by Grand Crown Hetman. Over time hiberna absorbed some other taxes (e.g. Jewish poll tax and kwarta) and extended to other population categories.

The term is borrowed from ancient Rome, where the castra hiberna were a winter camps for Roman legions.
