= Kwarta tax =

Tax in the Polish-Lithuanian Commonwealth

The kwarta (Lithuanian: kvarta) or quarter tax was a tax in Polish–Lithuanian Commonwealth on all incomes from crown estates in królewszczyzna (crown lands). It was established in 1563.

Initially the rate was 1/4, hence the name, later 1/5. Its purpose was to maintain the Kwarta army. Later it was absorbed into the hiberna military-purpose tax.
