= Dazdie =

Dazdie was the tax paid by Romani state serfs in Bessarabia to the Russian Empire after the region was incorporated in 1812.

Roma state serfs were organised in 3 categories:

- First class: owing annual taxes of 40 lei;
- Second class: owing annual taxes of 20 lei;
- Third class: consisting of the elderly, widows and orphans and owing no taxes.

Privately owned Roma serfs were not obliged to pay the tax.

The Roma serfs often emigrated to avoid state and private exploitation.

== See also ==
- Leibzoll
- Jizya
