= Taxation of the Jews in Europe =

Taxation of the Jews in Europe refers to taxes imposed specifically on Jews in Europe, in addition to the taxes levied on the general population. Special taxation imposed on the Jews by the state or ruler of the territory in which they were living has played an important part in Jewish history. The abolition of special taxes on the Jews followed their admission to civil rights in France and elsewhere in Europe at the end of the 18th and beginning of the 19th centuries.

== In the Roman Empire ==
The Fiscus Judaicus (Latin: "Jewish tax") or "Temple Tax" was a tax collecting agency instituted to collect the tax imposed on Jews in the Roman Empire after the destruction of the Temple of Jerusalem in 70 CE in favor of the temple of Jupiter Capitolinus in Rome.

The tax was initially imposed by Roman Emperor Vespasian as one of the measures against Jews as a result of the First Jewish-Roman War of 66–73 CE. Vespasian imposed the tax in the aftermath of the Jewish revolt (Josephus BJ 7. 218; Dio Cassius 65.7.2). The tax was imposed on all Jews throughout the empire, not just on those who took part in the revolt against Rome. The tax was imposed after the destruction of the Second Temple in 70 CE in place of the levy (or Tithe) payable by Jews towards the upkeep of the Temple. The amount levied was two denarii, equivalent to the half of a shekel that observant Jews had previously paid for the upkeep of the Temple of Jerusalem. (Exodus 30:13). A Tyrian shekel contained 13.1g of pure silver; at a spot valuation of USD$28/ozt in 2021 worth about $12. The tax was to go instead to the Temple of Capitoline Jupiter, the major center of ancient Roman religion. The fiscus Judaicus was a humiliation for the Jews. In Rome, a special procurator known as procurator ad capitularia Iudaeorum was responsible for the collection of the tax. Only those who had abandoned Judaism were exempt from paying it.

== In the Holy Roman Empire ==
The Jewish populations of Europe were politically insecure and could be easily exploited for the levying of heavy taxes in exchange for official protection. The high interest rates charged by Jews became an illimitable source of tax revenue and Jewish wealth was technically easy to gauge because Jews typically stored their assets in the form of cash or promissory notes.

The Imperial Tax Register of 1241 was the first register to include taxes on the Jews. The total of the taxes on the Jews listed in the Register amounted to 857 silver marks; the total contribution of all the cities together amounted to 4.290 silver marks. These local taxes served wholly or in part to finance town-building. Not all of the contributions reached the central administration. In contrast, it is clear from the Register that the payments made by the Jews reached the Exchequer in their entirety. The taxes on the Jews were first described as the ’’Jewish Tax’’ in 1330.

The Opferfennig (originally Guldenpfennig) tax was introduced in 1342 by Emperor Louis IV the Bavarian, who ordered all Jews above the age of 12 and possessing 20 gulden to pay one gulden annually for protection. This taxation was 1 florin for every Jew and included assets worth more than 20 florins. Widows were not exempted. King Wenceslas removed the taxable minimum but an exemption for Jews dependent on alms was made later by Sigsmund, who himself levied heavy taxation. Sigsmund taxed a third of the value of Jewish properties. It was represented as a coronation tax as part of Sigsmund's attempts to ascend the throne. Isenmann disagrees and believes it was an innovation sprouted by Archchamberlain Konrad von Weinsberg. By 1433-4 the tax collectors were collecting tax that was worth a half of Jewish properties.

Emperor Charles IV later ordered the income of the Opferfennig tax to be delivered to the archbishop of Triers. This tax was at some places replaced by an overall communal tax.

== Leibzoll ==
The Leibzoll or Judengeleit was a special toll which Jews had to pay in most of the European states in the Middle Ages and up to the beginning of the nineteenth century.

== In Hungary ==
Tolerance tax (Toleranzgebührer) was a tax that was levied against Jews of Hungary, then part of the Austrian Empire, beginning in 1747.

The tax was based on the German statute that a Jew was obliged to pay a certain tax to be "tolerated".

== In Poland ==
=== Koło ===
In 1571 a contract was drafted with regard to the status of the Jews in Koło, in which the city's Christians have undertaken to provide protection to the Jews, in return for which the Jews were required to pay a special annual municipal tax.

In 1729 the Jewish community was required to pay 150 gold coins as an annual poll tax, and in 1738 this sum was increased to 300 gold coins.

In 1775 the Polish parliament imposed a special duty on books written in Hebrew and Yiddish, requiring each book to be stamped by the municipality. Despite heavy penalties imposed on owners of unstamped books, many books were concealed and unstamped.

== In Russia ==
The Russian Kosher tax, known as the korobka, was a tax paid only by Jews for each animal slaughtered in accordance with the kashrut rules and for each pound of this meat sold. It was part of the Russian Jewish "basket tax" or "box tax". Though it was used to refer to a tax on meat or slaughtering, the word korobka (Russian: коробка) actually means "box" in Russian. The tax came to be called that because Jews paying had to deposit a coin in a box at the kosher slaughterer.

According to Herman Rosenthal and Jacob Goodale Lipman, the tax was "the most burdensome and annoying of the special taxes imposed upon the Jews of Russia by the government". The burden of taxes, and the korobka in particular, was one of the factors which drove many Jews to abandon the towns and settle in villages or on noblemen estates.

== In Galicia ==
Between 1777 and 1784, the Jews of Horodenka, a region on the southeast corner of Galicia, paid a number of special taxes, including the "protection and tolerance tax", and the "property and occupation tax". In 1784, the property and occupation tax was replaced with the kosher meat tax.

== In Moldavia ==
In 1741, Moldavian prince Grigore Ghica confirmed the obligation of each Jew to pay the crupca, an indirect tax on kosher meat similar to the Russian korobka.

== In Altona and Hamburg ==
During the period 1641–1842, the Jews of Altona (then a town close to Hamburg) paid specifically Jewish taxes as well as the same taxes as other residents of Altona. The tax burden on the members of the Jewish community was twice as heavy as that on the other residents.

In 1640 the Danish King Christian IV acquired part of the County of Pinneberg including Altona. Altona was subsequently granted the rights and status of a town on 23 August 1664.

=== Jews in Hamburg ===
The community was founded principally by Portuguese merchants and was known as the Portuguese-Jewish Community, although many of its members were of Spanish-Jewish descent.

These Sephardic Jews, who initially pretended to be persecuted Catholics, first came to Hamburg at the end of the 16th century. They were mostly Portuguese- or Spanish-speaking merchants. In 1621, when the armistice between Spain and the Netherlands came to an end, many of the Portuguese Jews moved to Hamburg. They were made welcome, even after the actual situation had become clear; however they were not permitted to establish a cemetery within the city walls. Thanks to the linguistic skills of the Sephardim and their contacts among their co-religionaries they controlled a large sector of the German market in provisions. The Sephardim differed culturally and socially from the Jews who came to Altona, and subsequently also to Hamburg, from the east. These were Yiddish Language speaking Ashkenazim. The permanent settlement of the Ashkenazim was opposed by both the Senate of Hamburg (town council) and the citizens, supported by the Sephardim, who did not wish to see the establishment of a second community in Hamburg. As servants, referred to as tudescos, the Ashkenazi Jews were, de facto, under the protection of the Sephardic Jews.

=== Jews in Altona ===
On 1 August 1641 the Danish king had formally granted the Ashkenazi Jews the privilege of having in Altona, as hitherto already granted by the counts of Holstein-Pinneberg (whose county had been integrated into then Denmark), a cemetery and a synagogue, thus providing the basis for the existence of a Jewish community. Subsequently, the Danish kings promised the Jews personal security, the freedom to practice trade and religious liberties. Some of the Jews living in neighbouring independent Hamburg therefore tried to secure the legal protection of the Danish crown in case of any attempt to expel them. In Altona the conditions of residence were favorable, in Hamburg the conditions for trading. These were the reasons for the genesis of the Altona community of Ashkenazi Jews from Hamburg and Altona. Thanks to immigration from the east, Altona became a center of research and scholarship in Jewish teaching, attracting hundreds of students. The officially recognized Jewish court of justice had a reputation as one of the most distinguished in the whole Jewish world. The Jews did not acquire these privileges freely, but in return for the payment of taxes.

=== Levies on Jews ===
From 1584 to 1639, as in the Middle Ages, the Jews of Altona paid taxes specific to the Jews, but no further taxes. Each Jewish family was required to pay 6 Reichstaler per year. Under Danish rule this changed: the Jews continued to pay the specifically Jewish taxes plus the same taxes as all other residents. From 1641 every Jewish family was required to pay 5 Reichstaler in Jewish taxes; in the year when Altona became a town the contribution rose to 6 Reichstaler. With the ordinance of 1641 the Danish king had permitted the Jews shechita. This privilege too was not cost-free. For the years 1667–1669 we have records of taxes paid by Jewish butchers. According to these the rates were 1 Mark and 8 Schillinge for an ox, 4 Schillinge for a calf and 2 Schillinge for a lamb. These taxes were twice as high as those paid by Christian butchers. From 1681 Individual taxes on the Jews (6 Reichstaler plus the payments made by the Jewish butchers), were replaced by lump-sum payments by the Jewish community.

From the year 1712 onwards it is possible to calculate the amount of the lump-sum payments made by the Jews. During the period 1712–1818 this amounted to 6 Reichstaler for each Jewish family; 6 Reichstaler was the level that had already been set in 1584. Assuming that a Jewish family consisted of approximately 6 persons, 6 Reichstaler corresponded to 1 Reichstaler for each individual Jew. On top of this 1 Reichstaler, also paid by the other residents, had to be paid. The tax burden on the members of the Jewish community was twice as heavy as that on the other residents. The influence of this on business practice constituted an obstacle to the granting of civil rights. In the year 1818 the Jewish Elders declared to the community of Altona that they could not, ’’on the one hand, levy specifically Jewish taxes on the members of their community and, on the other hand, encourage our co-religionaries, especially the younger ones, to pursue useful activity. In short: so to improve our condition that we might not seem unworthy to acquire civil rights. The extension – against our wishes - of the taxes on the Jews would be incompatible with the granting of civil rights.’’ This marks the beginning of the struggle of the Jewish community for emancipation. The Jewish community secured the abolition of taxes on the Jews in the year 1842.

== See also ==
- List of taxes mainly or exclusively targeting Jews:
  - Beard tax
  - Diploma tax, in the Soviet Union, est. 1972
  - Fiscus Judaicus (litt. "Jewish tax"), in the Roman Empire
  - Jewish poll tax, in the Polish-Lithuanian Commonwealth
  - Judenvermögensabgabe, a Nazi-era wealth tax
  - Kosher tax, in the Russian Empire
  - Leibzoll (litt. "body tax")
  - Rav akçesi (litt. "Rabbi tax"), in the Ottoman Empire
  - Temple tax, in Ancient Judea
  - Tolerance tax, in Hungary (1747-1797)
  - Varlık Vergisi (litt. "wealth tax"), in 1942 in Turkey
- Jizya, in historic Muslim states
- Protection racket
