= Kosher tax =

One of several indirect taxes imposed on Jews

The Kosher tax was one of several indirect taxes imposed by the Russian Imperial government—and sometimes by the Habsburg empire, Germany and Moldavia—on Jews.

== Russia ==
In Russia, the tax, known as the korobka, was a tax paid only by Jews for each animal slaughtered in accordance with the kashrut rules and for each pound of this meat sold. It was part of the Russian Jewish "basket tax" or "box tax". Though it was used to refer to a tax on meat or slaughtering, the word korobka (Russian: коробка) actually means "box" in Russian. The tax came to be called that because Jews paying had to deposit a coin in a box at the kosher slaughterer.

According to Herman Rosenthal and Jacob Goodale Lipman, the tax was "the most burdensome and annoying of the special taxes imposed upon the Jews of Russia by the government". The burden of taxes, and the korobka in particular, was one of the factors which drove many Jews to abandon the towns and settle in villages or on the estates of noblemen.

== Galicia ==
With the annexation to Austria in 1772, special taxes were imposed on Galician Jews ("Eastern Jews") for marriage permits, kosher meat, synagogues, and similar items.

Between 1777 and 1784, the Jews of Horodenka, a region on the south-east corner of Galicia, paid a number of special taxes, including the "Protection and Tolerance Tax", and "Property and Occupation tax". In 1784, the Property and Occupation Tax was cancelled and replaced with the Kosher Meat Tax.

== Moldavia ==
In 1741, Moldavian prince Grigore Ghica confirmed the obligation of each Jew to pay the crupca, an indirect tax on kosher meat similar to the Russian korobka.

== Germany ==
In the 18th and 19th centuries, Germany appears to have had a "kosher meat tax" imposed by municipalities and used to support the local Jewish community.

== See also ==
- Taxation of the Jews in Europe for other types of taxes imposed on the Jews
