= German Restitution Laws =

Series of laws passed in the 1950s West Germany

The German Restitution Laws were a series of laws passed in the 1950s in West Germany regulating the restitution of lost property and the payment of damages to victims of the Nazi persecution in the period 1933 to 1945. Such persecution included widespread theft of art and antiques and property owned by German Jews as well as aryanization of Jewish companies in the early 1930s after the Nazis came to power. The crimes escalated throughout their rule and culminated in the Holocaust from about 1939 on as Jews in Germany, Austria, Poland and Czechoslovakia were isolated and deported to their deaths in Nazi concentration camps, Nazi ghettos and death camps. Their remaining personal property such as wedding rings were stolen before their murder.

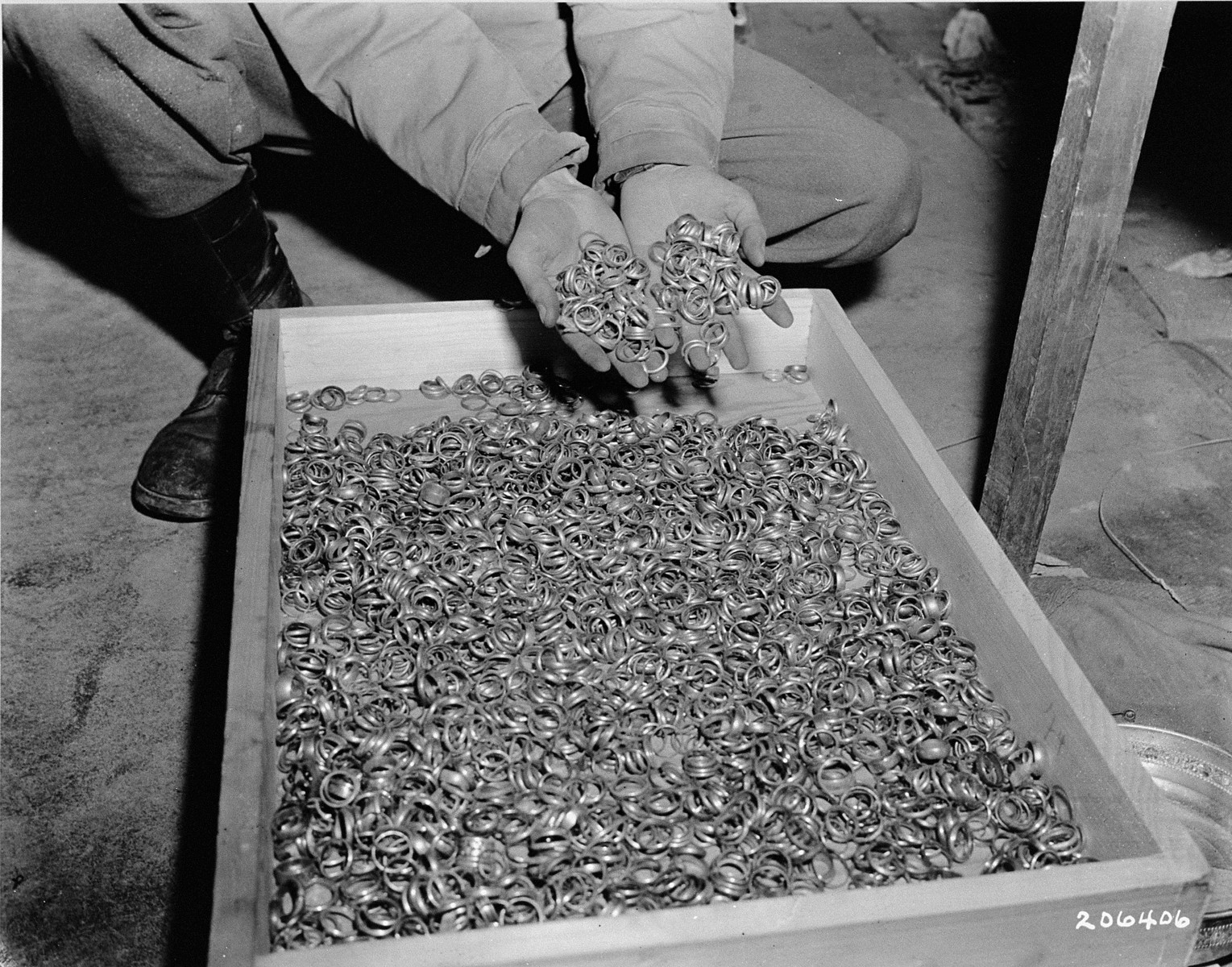
As Minister of Economics Walther Funk assisted the pace of rearmament, and subsequently as Reichsbank President accepted from the SS the gold rings of Nazi concentration camp victims

== First law ==
A first law for the restitution of private persons was the Bundesergänzungsgesetz zur Entschädigung für Opfer der nationalsozialistischen Verfolgung (BErG) of 18 September 1953. This law was passed after only 3½ month of deliberations, and it was felt that improvements and amendments would be needed. Such changes were made in the Bundesgesetz zur Entschädigung für Opfer der nationalsozialistischen Verfolgung (BEG), which was passed on 29 June 1956 and modified again in the Bundesentschädigungsschlussgesetz (BEG-SG) of 14 September 1965. Both the BEG and the BEG-SG became effective retroactively as of 1 October 1953.

== Other laws ==
Other restitution laws were the Gesetz zur Wiedergutmachung nationalsozialistischen Unrechts im öffentlichen Dienst (BWGöD) for (former) employees of public service institutions of 11 May 1951 and the Bundesgesetz zur Regelung der rückerstattungsrechtlichen Geldverbindlichkeiten des Deutschen Reiches und gleichgestellter Rechtsträger (Bundesrückerstattungsgesetz, BRüG) of 19 July 1957.

The BErG/BEG deals with compensatory payments for suffered personal damage, while the BRüG covers restitutions for expropriated property. Claimants had to file their claims in order to receive payments; the term for filing claims under the BEG expired on 31 December 1969.

After the fall of the German Democratic Republic and the reunification of Germany in 1990, German authorities had to wrestle with the enormous complexity of applying these laws and former GDR law in addressing property claims.

== See also ==
- Nazi plunder
- Reich Flight Tax
- Wiedergutmachung
