= Wiedergutmachung =

Reparations paid by West Germany in the years following World War II

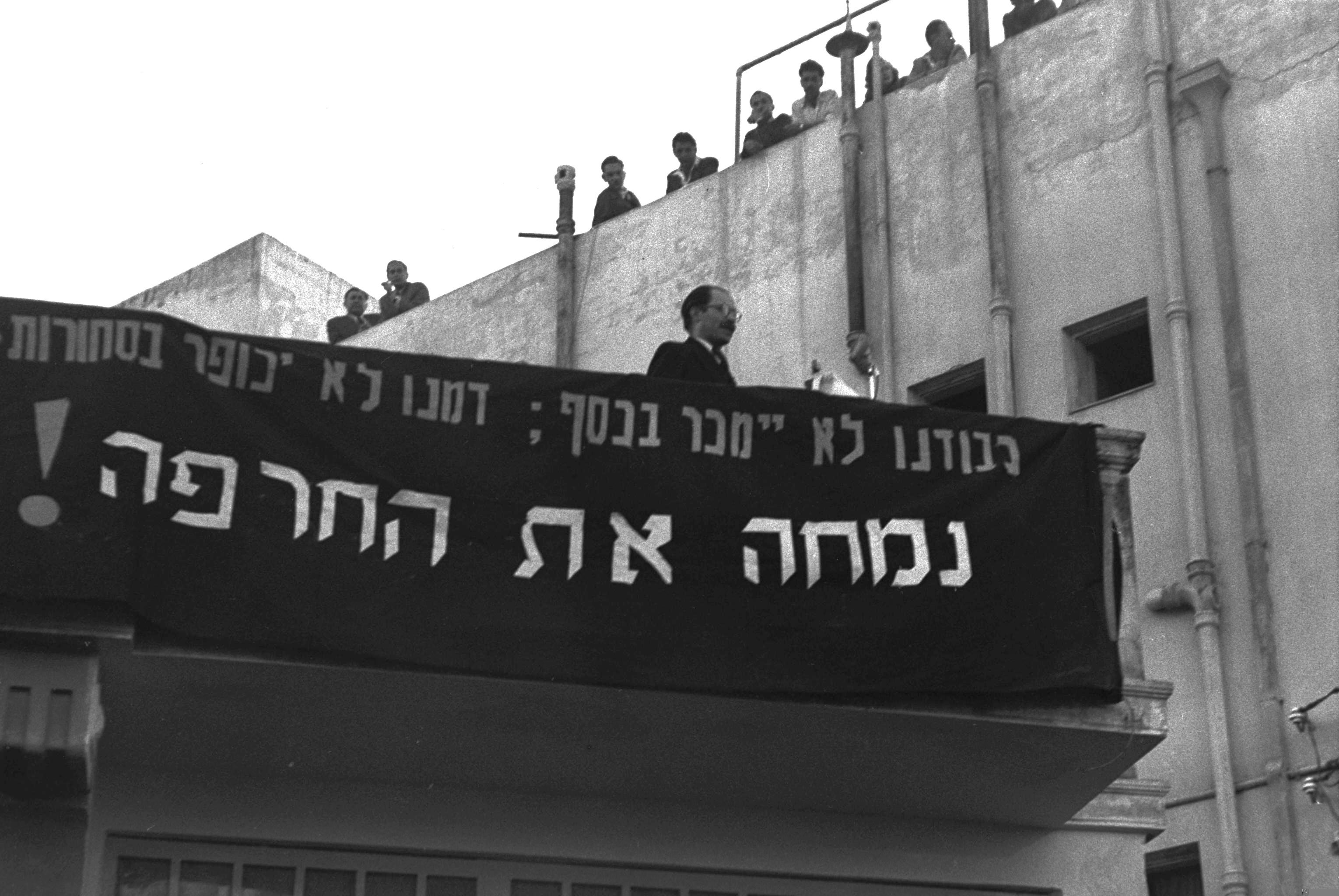
1952 demonstration in Israel against any deals with Germany. On stage is Menachem Begin. The sign reads: "Our honor shall not be sold for money; our blood shall not be atoned by goods. We shall wipe out the disgrace!"

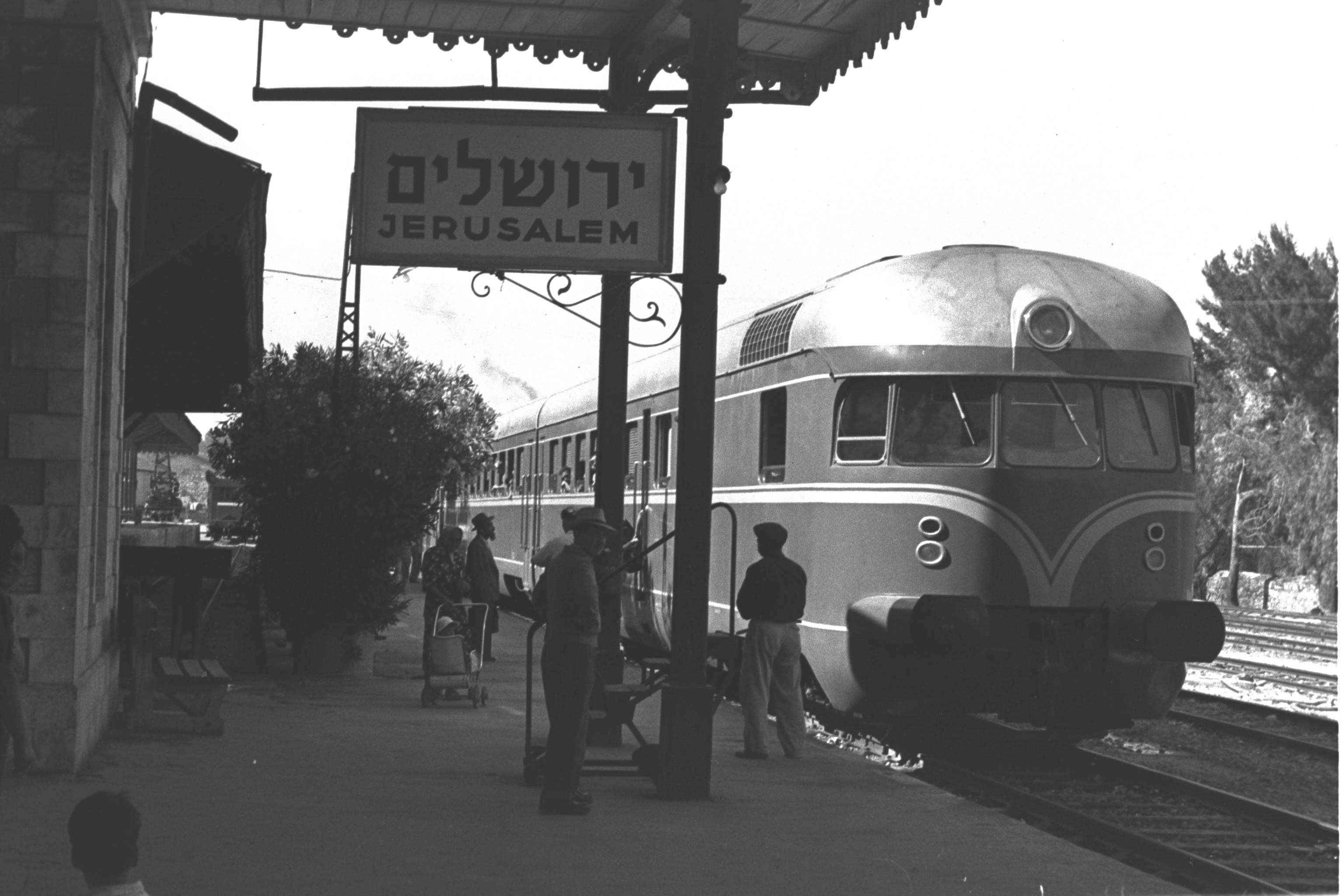
Jerusalem railcar manufactured by Maschinenfabrik Esslingen, as part of the reparations agreement with Germany.

Wiedergutmachung (German pronunciation: [viːdɐˈɡuːtˌmaxʊŋ]; German: "compensation", "restitution", lit: "make good again") refers to the reparations that the German government agreed to pay in 1953 to the direct survivors of the Holocaust, and to those who were made to work at forced labour camps or who otherwise became victims of the Nazis. The sum would amount, through the years, to over 100 billion Deutsche Mark. Historian Tony Judt writes about Wiedergutmachung:

In making this agreement Konrad Adenauer ran some domestic political risk: in December 1951, just 5% of West Germans surveyed admitted feeling 'guilty' towards Jews. A further 29% acknowledged that Germany owed some restitution to the Jewish people. The rest were divided between those (some two-fifths of respondents) who thought that only people 'who really committed something' were responsible and should pay, and those (21%) who thought 'that the Jews themselves were partly responsible for what happened to them during the Third Reich.' When the restitution agreement was debated in the Bundestag on March 18th 1953, the Communists voted against, the Free Democrats abstained and both the Christian Social Union and Adenauer's own CDU were divided, with many voting against any Wiedergutmachung (reparations).

The noun Wiedergutmachung is the general term for "restitution" or "reparation". The noun is made up of wieder ("again"), gut ("good" or "well"), and machung, a verbal noun of machen ("to make"). The verb wiedergutmachen means literally "to make good again" or to compensate. Wiedergutmachungsgeld means "Wiedergutmachung money."

In the former East Germany, Wiedergutmachung was mostly directed to Poland and the former USSR.

The German federal office currently in charge of this issue is the Bundesamt für zentrale Dienste und offene Vermögensfragen (BADV) (Federal Office for Central Services and Unresolved Property Issues). It applies the "Federal Compensation Laws" and took these responsibilities over from the Verwaltungsamt für innere Restitutionen, which, in its charter, states:

Individuals who were persecuted for political, racial, religious or ideological reasons by the wartime German regime are eligible for money from the German government under the terms of the Federal Compensation Law (BEG) of 1953 and 1956. This includes Jews who were interned in camps or ghettos, were obliged to wear the star badge, or who lived in hiding.

Only people who were directly victimised are eligible for Wiedergutmachung, and not, for example, offspring born after the war or grandchildren. Statistics concerning Wiedergutmachung payments were released by the BEG through the mid-1980s, but have not since been publicly released. As of the mid-1980s, over four million claims had been filed and paid. Approximately 40% of the claims were from Israel, where many Holocaust survivors live, 20% were from Germany, and 40% were from other countries.

The process in Germany was often extremely difficult. According to a report commissioned by the German government on the "Fate of Jewish Clothiers in the Nazi Dictatorship": "For those who applied, the euphemistic-sounding terms 'compensation' and 'reparations' often meant a bitter fight which sometimes lasted for decades and over generations, and whose result was uncertain. Restitution of the assets confiscated unlawfully during those days has still not been fully completed."

An unusual compensation was to Ireland, a neutral country, for bombings in 1941.

On 3 December 1998, Germany was a signer of the "Washington Principles on Nazi-Confiscated Art". Adherence to these principles is strictly voluntary and not a legal requirement. The Washington Principles cover only items in the possession of public institutions, and not items in the possession of private individuals. Germany has no law in effect which actively requires institutions to have their possessions searched for Nazi-looted goods, unlike the 1998 restitution law in Austria.

Unlike the Nuremberg trials, in which Fritz Sauckel received a death sentence for his organization of mass forced labor, Wiedergutmachung aimed to compensate the "victims of Nazi persecution" while presenting mass forced labor as a normal part of war rather than a crime.

== See also ==
- Germany-Israel relations
- Claims Conference
- Nazi plunder
- Reich Flight Tax
- Reparations Agreement between Israel and West Germany
