= Diploma tax =

Exit tax imposed by the Soviet Union

The diploma tax is an informal reference to the one-time payment imposed in the Soviet Union on would-be emigrants who received a higher education there. It was introduced in August 1972. The professed justification for the tax was to repay state expenses for public education, but the measure was designed to combat the brain drain caused by the growing emigration of Soviet Jews to the West. The accompanying instruction issued the same day set the rules about fees. For example, a graduate of the Moscow State University had to pay 12,200 roubles (an average monthly salary was 130–150 roubles).

The development caused international protests, 21 United States Nobel laureates issued a public statement that condemned it as a "massive violation of human rights."

It is believed that item 3 of the Jackson–Vanik amendment addressed the issue.

== Abolition ==
Under the international pressure, the Soviet government abolished the tax. The declassified KGB archives recount the process leading up to the decision.

Leonid Brezhnev ordered the KGB to study the Jewish emigration to make a decision on the issue of the diploma tax. The report was presented to Soviet Politburo on March 20, 1973, just before the introduction of the Jackson-Vanik Amendment in the US Congress. The findings were surprising: the vast majority of the Jews applying to visas were not educated professionals but sales clerks and people of minor trades. In 1972, of about 29,000 emigrants, only 13.5% had university diplomas, and only 30 persons had Candidate of Sciences or Doctor of Sciences (equivalents of Ph.D. or higher) degree.

Brezhnev, demonstrating his knowledge of the internal works of the American politics, mentioned Jackson-Vanik when he argued the repeal of the tax, apparently trying to prevent the amendment. Yuri Andropov was against the repeal and argued that it would look like a sign of weakness. The same day, it was eventually announced that the diploma tax would remain "in the books" but would not be enforced.

== See also ==
- Departure tax
- Expatriation tax
- Reich Flight Tax
