= Tolerance tax =

Type of tax

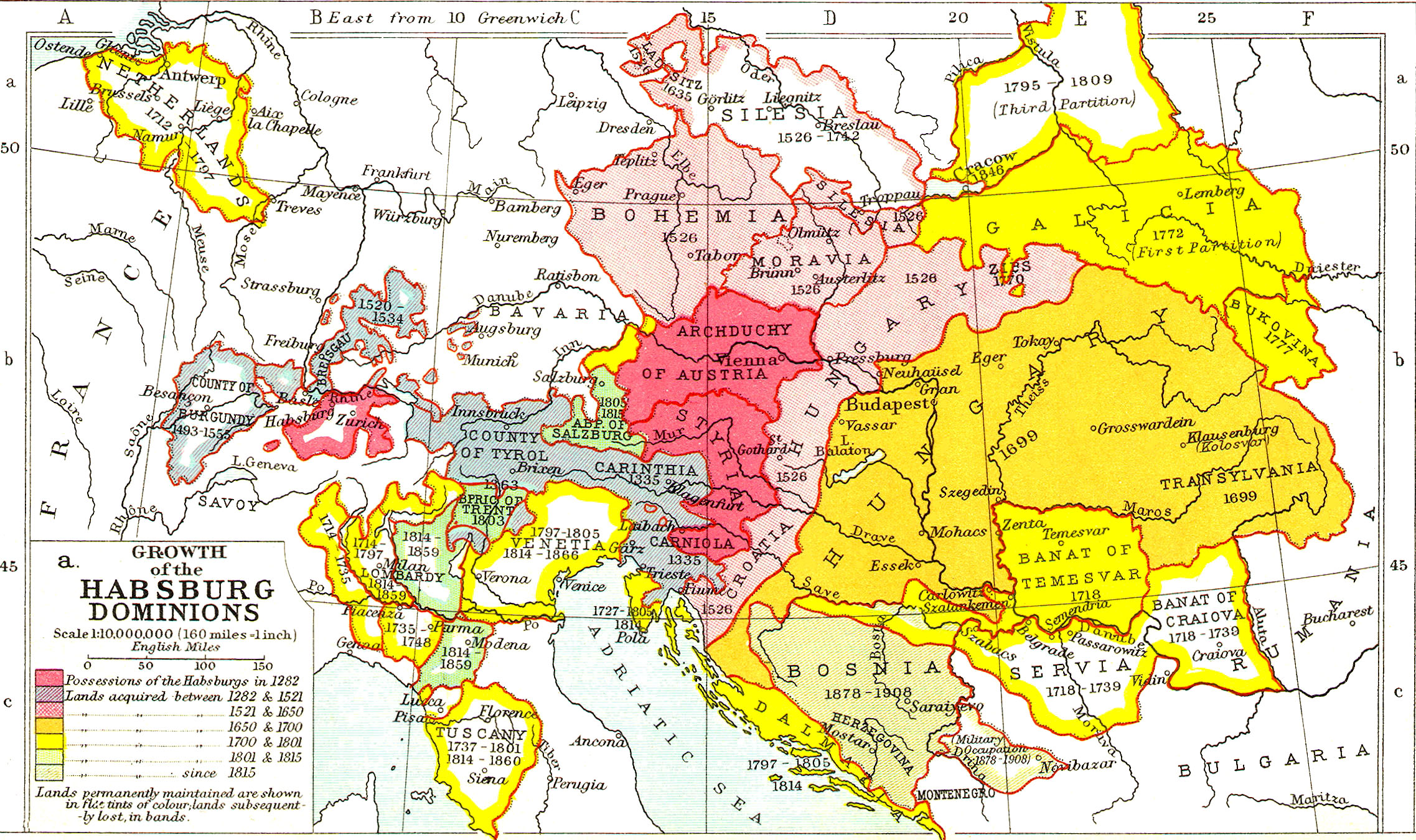
Habsburg empire in 1815; Kingdom of Hungary in orange.

Tolerance tax or toleration tax (Latin: taxa tolerantialis; German: Toleranzgebührer; Hungarian: türelmi adó) was a tax that was levied against the Jews of the Kingdom of Hungary, then part of the Austrian Empire, between 1747 and 1797.

The tax was based on the German statute that a Jew was obliged to pay a certain tax to be tolerated, i.e., not expelled.

== Under Maria Theresa (1740–1780) ==
In 1747, during the reign of Empress Maria Theresa, the Jews of Hungary were taxed for the privilege of remaining in the empire, and were threatened with expulsion if they did not pay.

On September 1, 1749, the delegates of the Hungarian Jews, except those from Szatmár County, assembled at Pressburg and met a royal commission, which informed them that they would be expelled from the country if they did not pay this tax. The frightened Jews at once agreed to do so; and the commission then demanded a yearly tax of 50,000 florins. This sum being excessive, the delegates protested; and although the queen had fixed ƒ30,000 as the minimum tax, they were finally able to compromise on the payment of ƒ20,000 a year for a period of eight years. The delegates were to apportion this amount among the districts; the districts, their respective sums among the communities; and the communities, theirs among the individual members.

The queen confirmed this agreement of the commission, except the eight-year clause, changing the period to three years, which she subsequently made five. The agreement, thus ratified by the queen, was brought on November 26 before the courts, which were powerless to relieve the Jews from the payment of this Malkegeld ("queen's money" in Yiddish), as they called it.

The Jews, thus burdened by new taxes, thought the time ripe for taking steps to remove various oppressive disabilities. While still at Presburg the delegates had brought their grievances before the mixed commission that was called delegata in puncto tolerantialis taxae et gravaminum Judeorum commissio mixta. These complaints pictured the distress of the Jews of that time.

The commission laid these complaints before the Queen, indicating the manner in which they could be relieved; and their suggestions were subsequently willed by the queen and made into law.

The queen relieved the Jews from the Tolerance tax in Upper Hungary only. In regard to the other complaints she ordered that the Jews should specify them in detail, and that the government should remedy them insofar as they came under its jurisdiction.

The Tolerance tax had hardly been instituted when Michael Hirsch petitioned the government to be appointed primate of the Hungarian Jews in order to be able to settle difficulties that might arise among them, and to collect the tax. The government did not recommend Hirsch, but decided that in case the Jews should refuse to pay, it might be advisable to appoint a primate to adjust the matter.

Before the end of the period of five years the delegates of the Jews again met the commission at Pressburg (Bratislava) and offered to increase the amount of their tax to ƒ25,000 a year if the queen would promise that it should remain at that sum for the next ten years. The queen had other plans, however; not only did she dismiss the renewed gravamina of the Jews, but rather imposed stiffer regulations upon them. Their tax of ƒ20,000 was increased to ƒ30,000 in 1760; to ƒ50,000 in 1772; to ƒ80,000 in 1778; and to ƒ160,000 in 1813.

The method of calculating the Tolerance tax varied over time and location, according to the size of household, occupation, and income-producing assets.

== Under Joseph II ==
In 1783, Emperor Joseph II, the son of Maria Theresa, allowed Jews to settle in Pest, while enacting a tolerance tax, which the Jews had to pay to the town.

After 1789, the Jews paid a tolerance tax of 4 florins per family, a tax on kosher meat, a marriage tax, a tax on the synagogues and cemeteries of 100 florins per year, and a quota tax of 50 florins per year.

In 1797, after the death of Joseph II, the tolerance tax and the taxes on homes and properties were replaced by a candle tax on Jewish religious candles.

In Croatia, Slavonia, and Dalmatia, further rights were granted to Jews in 1840, but the "tolerance tax" remained in force.

== See also ==
- Taxation of the Jews in Europe for other types of taxes imposed on the Jews
- Jizya
- 1782 Edict of Tolerance
- 1942 wealth tax in Turkey
