= Jewish poll tax =

The Jewish poll tax (Polish: pogłówne żydowskie) was a poll tax imposed on Jews in the Polish–Lithuanian Commonwealth. It was later absorbed into the hiberna tax.

The Jews were exempt from other state and municipal taxes, which often caused protests from Polish city dwellers.

Initially the collection of the tax was a duty of Jewish Councils (Council of Four Lands, Council of the Land of Lithuania). Sometimes it was paid to the royal treasury, other times it was paid directly to the military units funded from this tax.

The Jewish councils divide the tax into smaller internal divisions called "portions" (Hebrew: skhumot, Polish: sympla). The sum of the portions was always larger than the state-imposed amount, and the council used the surplus for the needs of Jewish community and the council apparatus. This practice was common for non-Jewish taxes as well, and the Crown was aware of it.

By early 17th century, the duty of Jewish poll tax was transferred to sejmiks, and it was later transferred to the Polish military; by mid-17th century, it was absorbed into the hiberna.

== See also ==
- Taxation of the Jews in Europe for other types of taxes imposed on the Jews
