= Rav akçesi =

"Rabbi tax" paid by Jewish communities in the Ottoman Empire

Rav akçesi was a "rabbi tax" paid by Jewish communities in the Ottoman Empire. The origins of rav akçesi are unclear; it has been suggested that it was one of two taxes imposed specifically on Jews, and that it may have developed in parallel with the authority of a senior rabbi in Istanbul, who was at nominally a representative and judge for Jewish communities in the Ottoman empire, although their authority may not have extended far beyond Istanbul.

It has been suggested that Mehmet II imposed the tax in return for separate representation of Jews after 1455, as part of a broader effort to rebuild and revive Istanbul; this may also have served to undermine the Greek patriarchy. Under the Ottoman empire there was, at time, friction between "Greeks" and "Jews"; the authorities may at times have favoured one over the other.

Although rav akçesi was a cash tax, rather than a tax in kind, it could be hypothecated to provide specific goods; tax records for 1655 show that the rav akçesi in Monastir (Bitola) was a significant source of funding of drapery for Janissaries; the tax official responsible for purchases would be the same person responsible for collecting the tax.

Non-Muslims were usually taxed at a higher rate, overall, in the Ottoman empire, thanks to taxes such as rav akçesi and ispence. Jews in particular may have been singled out to pay higher rates of ispence. The Porte was well aware of this - and even aware that this would tempt non-Muslims to convert; Bayezit II ruled that courts should treat non-Muslims more leniently (including such measures as lower fines), "so that the poll-tax payers shall not vanish".

As with other taxes in the Ottoman Empire, rav akçesi could be affected by a complex patchwork of local rules and exemptions, including muafiyet; the Jews of Selanik (Thessaloniki) were among those exempted from taxes by a muafname after the city was conquered by Murad II.

== See also ==
- Taxation of the Jews in Europe for other types of taxes imposed on the Jews
