= The Miraculous Draught of Fishes (Jordaens) =

Painting by Jacob Jordaens

The Miraculous Draught of Fish or The Coin in the Fish's Mouth
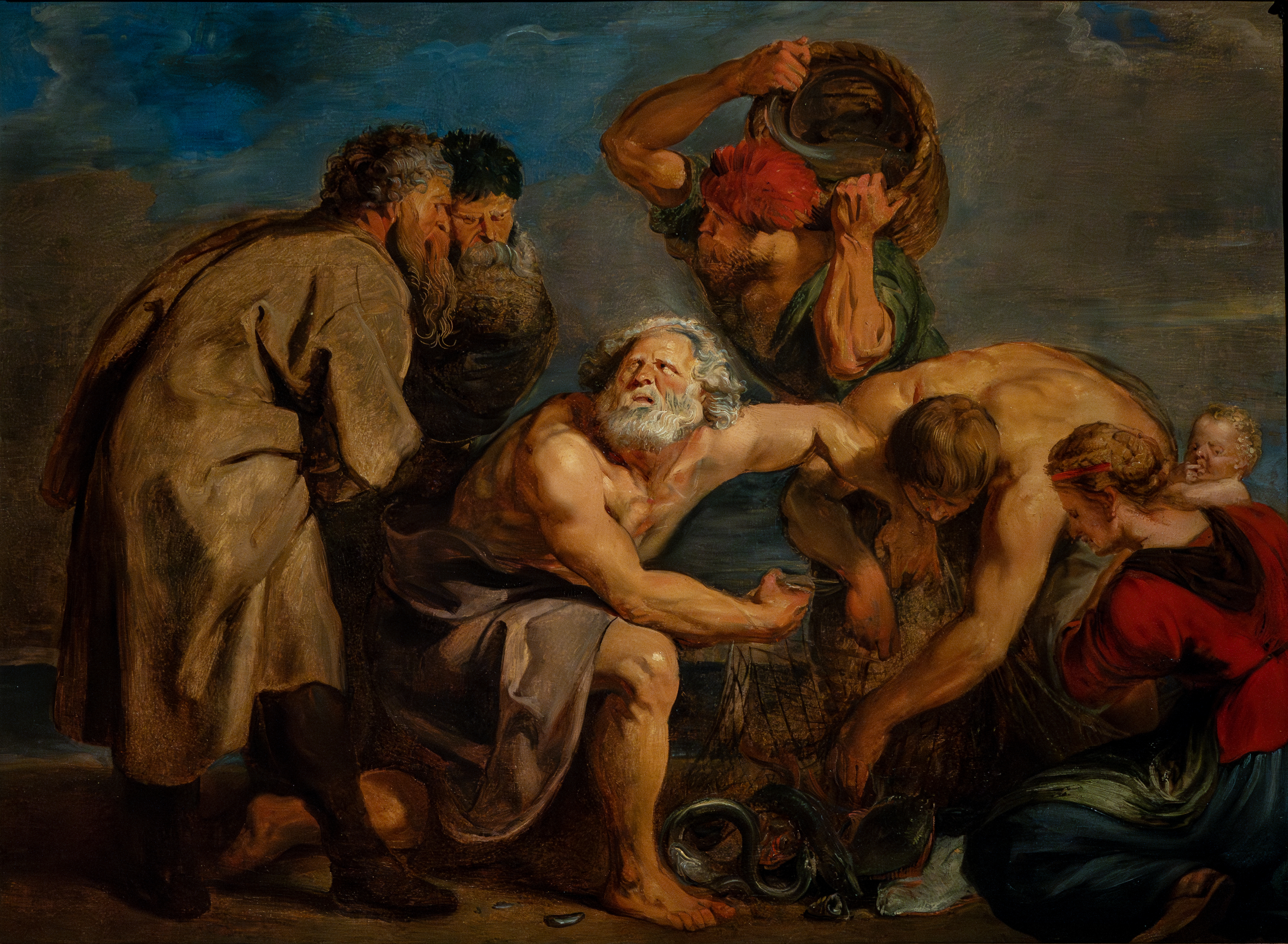
- Artist: Jacob Jordaens
- Year: c. 1618–1620
- Catalogue: MBA 618
- Medium: oil painting on panel
- Movement: Flemish Baroque painting
- Subject: Miraculous catch of fish or Coin in the fish's mouth
- Dimensions: 75 cm × 104 cm (30 in × 41 in)
- Location: Musée des Beaux-Arts, Strasbourg
- Accession: 1911

The Miraculous Draught of Fish or Peter Finding the Coin in the Mouth of a Fish is an oil on panel painting currently attributed to the Flemish artist Jacob Jordaens and dated to c. 1618-1620. It is in the collection of the Musée des Beaux-Arts of Strasbourg. The subject of the painting has traditionally been identified as one of the two stories of the miraculous draught of fish as told in the New Testament. Jordaens had already treated this subject earlier in the Miraculous Catch of Fish in the St. James' Church of Antwerp. The observation that Saint Peter appears to be looking for a coin in the mouth of the fish suggests that it may depict another New Testament story, i.e. the story of Peter looking to retrieve a silver coin from the mouth of a fish to pay the tribute (or temple) money. The latter subject has been treated by Jordaens in two other compositions.

== History and attribution ==
The early provenance of the painting is unknown. German art historian and museum curator Wilhelm von Bode bought it in 1911 as a Rubens from art dealer Ayerst Hooker Buttery in London. Von Bode had bought it for the Musée des Beaux-Arts in Strasbourg with funds from a donation from the estate of the German publisher Karl Trübner in 1910. It entered the collection of the Musée des Beaux-Arts in Strasbourg in 1911. The Rubens specialist Justus Müller-Hofstede confirmed the attribution to Rubens in 1969. Only in 1977 did a consensus emerge among art historians that the painting is more likely a work dating to the end of Jacob Jordaens's early period when he was in close contact with the Rubens workshop in Antwerp. The re-attribution was based on compositional as well as chromatic grounds. Alternative attributions to other artists in the orbit of Rubens such as Willem van Herp, Jan Boeckhorst and Artus Wolffort have not been generally accepted.

A drawing in the Louvre attributed to school of Rubens appears to be a preparatory drawing for the painting.

== Description of the painting ==
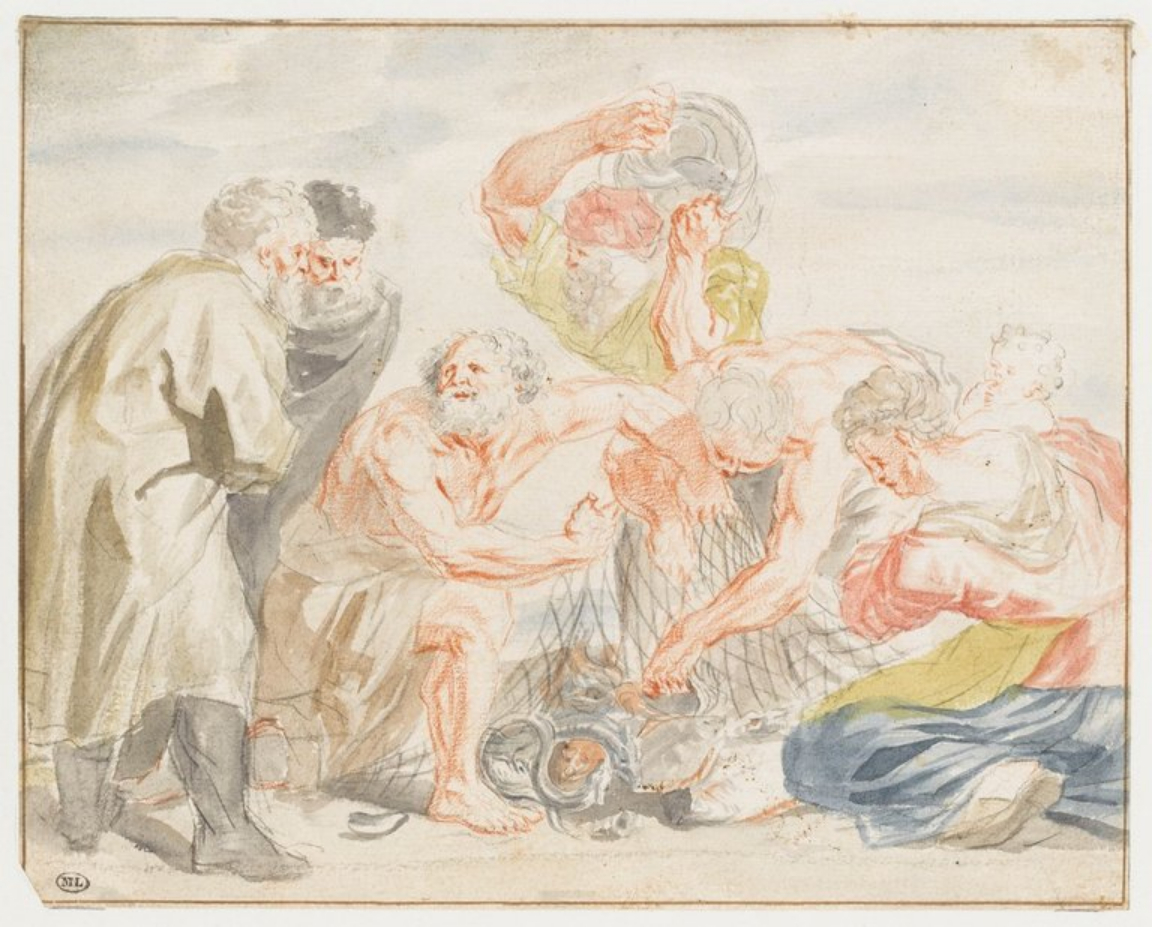
Peter Finding the Coin in the Mouth of a Fish, Louvre

Seven figures fill up most of the painting's space. They are gathered on a sandy shore around a net which has just been brought ashore and from which some fish have escaped. Behind them the sea is vaguely visible. In the center, a kneeling, half-naked Saint Peter is holding the net up with both hands while he looks back with a worried expression towards two older men on the left. These men with frowning looks lean slightly forward to better see what is happening in the net. A young bare-chested fisherman is grabbing in the net and seems to have his left hand in the mouth of a big fish. Not very well visible in the painting, but more so in the preparatory drawing in the Louvre, he seems to be holding a small shiny disk between the thumb and index of his left hand. In the foreground on the right, a young woman holding a child pressed against herself is kneeling next to the net and looking intently at its contents. In the background, a fisherman is passing, hunched over by the heavy basket full of fish which he is carrying on his back.

The purpose of the painting has never been satisfactorily established. It is too large for an oil sketch, and too rough for an official commission. It may be a modello for a lost, larger and more polished painting, or for a tapestry. It could also have been destined for a predella.

== The Biblical source ==
When the painting was originally acquired in 1911, its subject was identified as an episode from the story of the miraculous catch of fish, which is only recounted in the Gospel of John (John 21:1–14) The Gospel passage contains Jesus' third post-resurrection appearance to his disciples. It tells how seven disciples of Jesus, comprising Peter, Thomas (called the Twin), Nathanael of Cana in Galilee, the sons of Zebedee (presumably John the Apostle and James the Great) and two unnamed disciples take their boat out one night to go fishing on the Sea of Tiberias (also called the Sea of Galilee). They fail to catch any fish all night. Just after daybreak, Jesus is standing on the shore of the Sea but the disciples do not recognize him. He calls out and asks whether they caught any fish. When they answer in the negative, he tells them to cast their net on the right side of the boat. After casting their net as advised they catch a great number of fish — 153 large ones. When John realizes that the person on the shore is Jesus, he tells this to Peter. Peter puts on some clothes as he is fishing naked and jumps into the water to swim to shore, while the others bring in the catch. Upon reaching the shore, they notice a charcoal fire with fish on it and bread. Jesus asks them to bring some of their catch. Peter then returns to the boat and pulls the net ashore. The net does not break despite the large and heavy catch. Jesus then invites them to have breakfast. The disciples do not dare to ask him who he is as they know it is Jesus. The story ends with Jesus taking the bread and fish and giving it to the disciples.

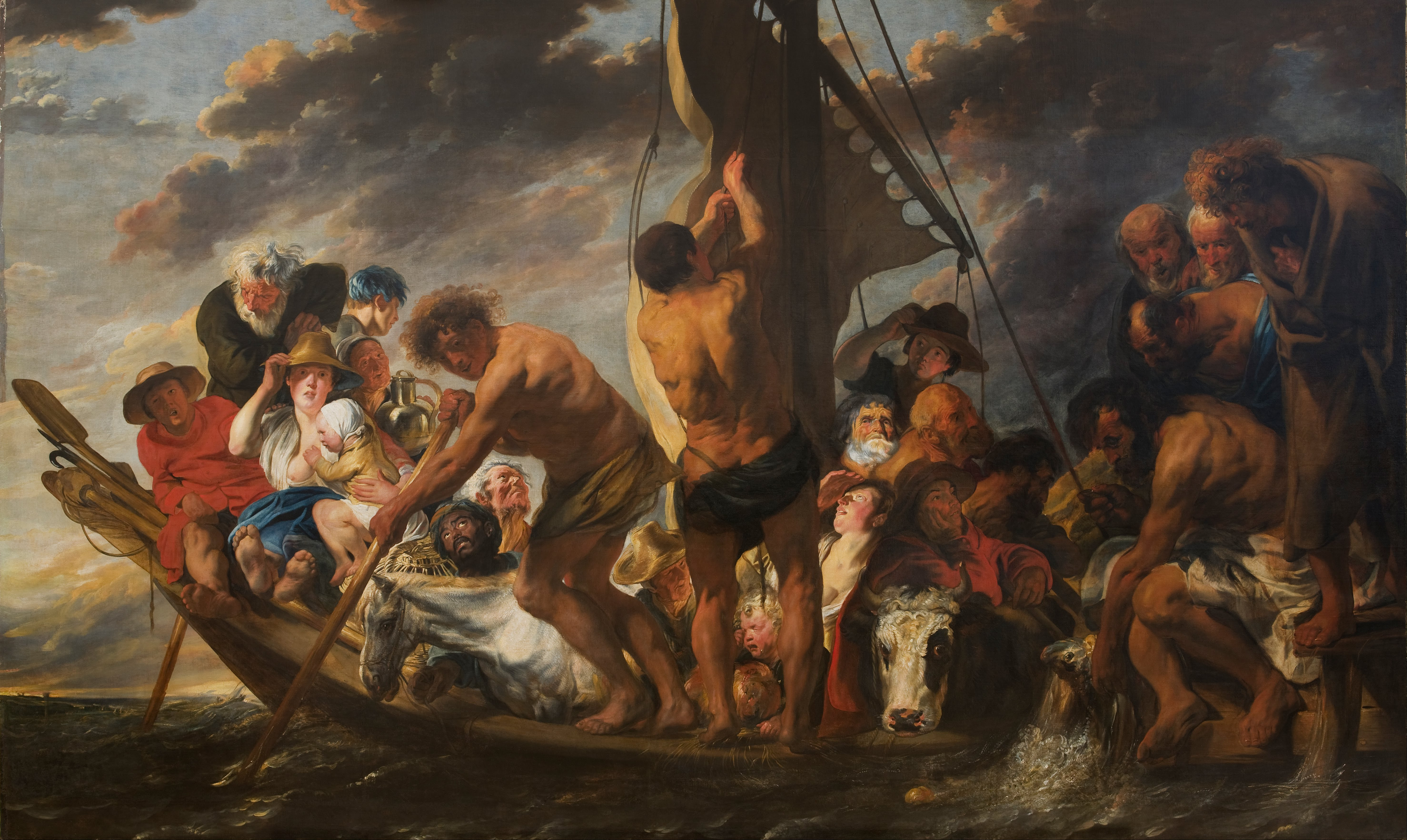
Peter Finding the Silver Coin in the Mouth of the Fish by Jordaens, National Gallery of Denmark (1616–1634)

According to the museum website, the painting shows the moment after the miracle has happened and the disciples have brought their large catch onshore. However, most of the other important elements of the Gospel story seem to be missing, in particular, its principal character Jesus who supposedly has just made his third post-resurrection appearance. For this reason, the art historian Dominique Jaquot has proposed that the composition more likely depicts the story of Peter finding the coin in the mouth of the fish to pay the tribute money as told in Matthew 17:24-27. In this story, after Jesus and his disciples arrive in Capernaum, the collectors of the two-drachma temple tax come to Peter and ask him, "Doesn't your teacher pay the temple tax?" whereupon Peter replies "Yes, he does." When Peter comes into the house, Jesus is the first to speak and asks him "What do you think, Simon?. From whom do the kings of the earth collect duty and taxes — from their own children or from others?" Peter replies "From others". Jesus then replies: "Then the children are exempt. But so that we may not cause offense, go to the lake [the Sea of Galilee] and throw out your line. Take the first fish you catch; open its mouth and you will find a four-drachma coin. Take it and give it to them for my tax and yours." The coin was needed to pay the local temple tax, which every Israelite was required to pay to the temple in Jerusalem. Matthew's Gospel story does not itself recount the story of Peter following up on Jesus' instruction and catching the fish and paying the temple tax. As the Gospel is silent on the details of Saint Peter's fishing expedition to obtain the four-drachma coin, Jordaens may have felt that this story gave him a lot of artistic freedom. He let his imagination run free in two later paintings of this subject (respectively in the National Gallery of Denmark and the Rijksmuseum) in which he placed the scene of Saint Peter finding the coin in a wide marine landscape showing a crowded ferry boat taking off from a pier. The Strasbourg painting could be depicting the moment in which the coin is discovered in the mouth of the fish. In his other treatments of this subject Jordaens seems to have followed more closely the Gospel text which requires Peter to cast out a line to catch the fish. In the Strasbourg painting the fish has apparently been caught with a net and it is not Peter but another disciple who retrieves the coin from the mouth of the fish with Peter's assistance.

== Style and execution ==
Jordaens uses a reddish palette. He has succeeded in connecting the figures who are placed closely together. They exude a strong impression of physical strength. The fishermen are depicted without embellishment.
