= Matthew 17 =

- ← chapter 16 chapter 18 →
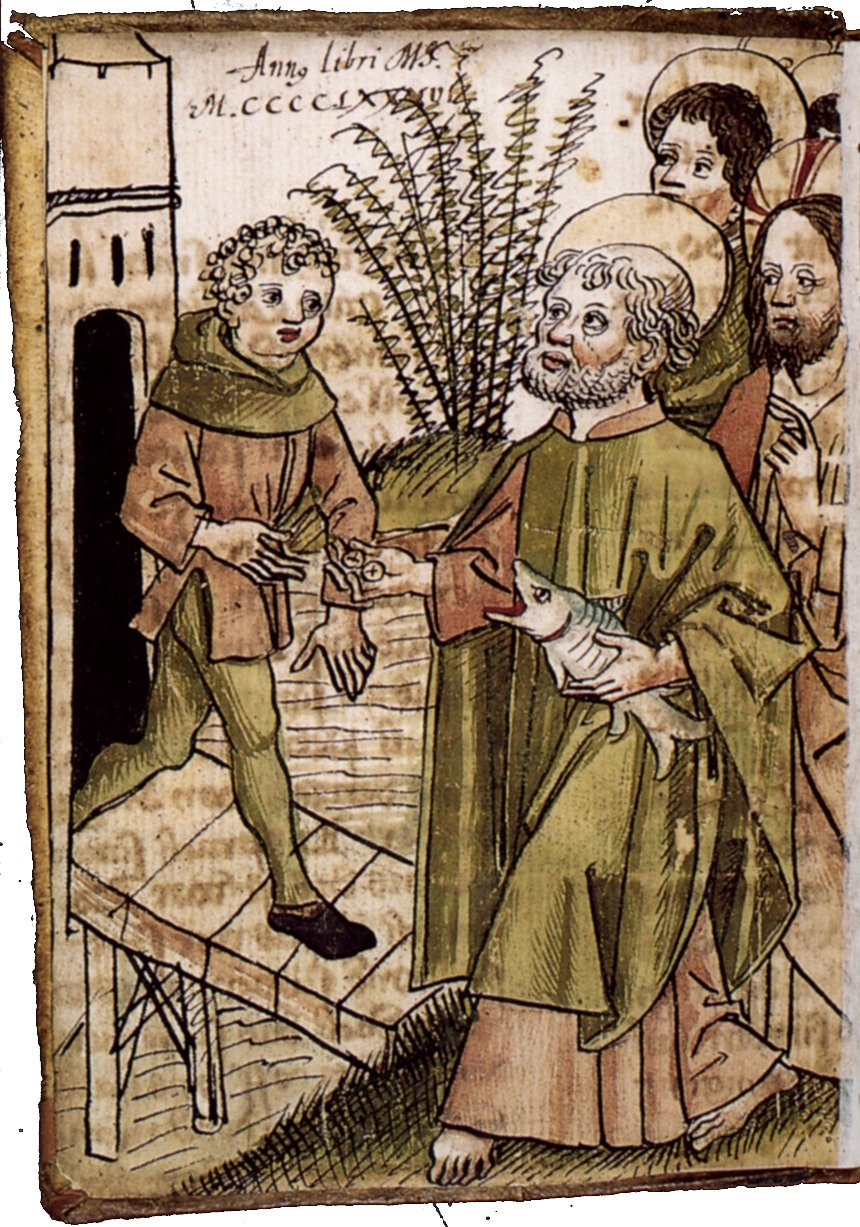
- The Apostle Peter paying the temple tax with a coin from a fish's mouth by Augustin Tünger, 1486
- Book: Gospel of Matthew
- Category: Gospel
- Christian Bible part: New Testament
- Order in the Christian part: 1

Matthew 17 is the seventeenth chapter in the Gospel of Matthew in the New Testament section of the Christian Bible. Jesus continues his final journey to Jerusalem ministering through Galilee. William Robertson Nicoll identifies "three impressive tableaux" in this chapter: the transfiguration, the epileptic boy and the temple tribute.

== Locations ==
The chapter opens six days after the events of the previous chapter, which take place in the region of Caesarea Philippi, near the southwestern base of Mount Hermon. Matthew in verse 16:21 states that Jesus must go to Jerusalem, but this journey does not properly begin until Matthew 19:1. With Peter, James and John, he goes to a high mountain, traditionally understood and commemorated as Mount Tabor, where he is transfigured. Mount Tabor is in the south of Galilee. By verse 14 they have returned to a location where the crowd is gathered, verse 22 notes that they are still in Galilee, and in verse 24 they have returned to Capernaum at the northern end of the Sea of Galilee.

James Burton Coffman suggests that the location of the transfiguration would have been either Mount Hermon, closer to Caesarea Philippi, "or one of its adjacent peaks": "Mount Tabor, in the days of Christ and the apostles was populated and had a fortress on top of it; and Christ's taking his apostles there would not have been taking them 'apart', as Matthew said" (Matthew 17:1 in the King James Version), nor was Mount Tabor a particularly "high" mountain.

== Text ==
The original text was written in Koine Greek. This chapter is divided into 27 verses.

=== Textual witnesses ===
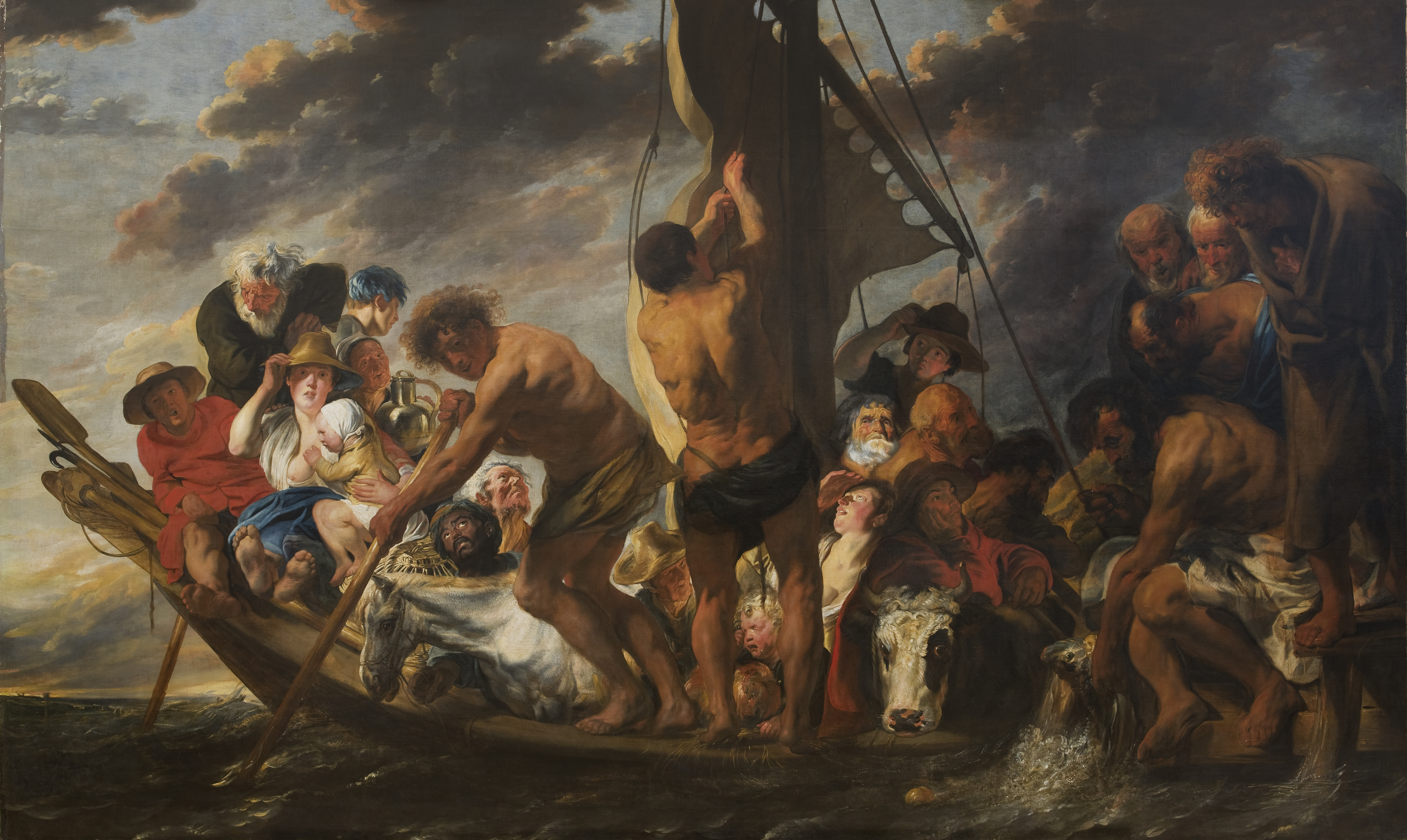
Peter Finds the Silver Coin in the Mouth of the Fish by Jacob Jordaens

Some early manuscripts containing the text of this chapter are:

- Codex Vaticanus (AD 325–350; no verse 21)
- Codex Sinaiticus (330–360; no verse 21)
- Codex Bezae (c. 400; complete)
- Codex Washingtonianus (c. 400; complete)
- Codex Ephraemi Rescriptus (c. 450; extant verses 1–25)
- Codex Purpureus Rossanensis (6th century)
- Codex Sinopensis (6th century; extant verses 2–24)
- Papyrus 44 (6th/7th century; extant verses 1–3, 6–7)

== Chapter organisation ==
The New King James Version organises this chapter as follows:

- Jesus transfigured on the Mount (Matthew 17:1–13)
- A Boy is Healed (Matthew 17:14–21)
- Jesus Again Predicts His Death and Resurrection (Matthew 17:22–23)
- Peter and His Master Pay Their Taxes (Matthew 17:24–27)

== Transfiguration of Jesus (verses 1–8) ==
The first eight verses of this chapter record the account of the Transfiguration of Jesus, an event where Jesus is transfigured and becomes radiant in glory on top of a mountain. The passage has parallels in other Synoptic Gospels—Mark 9:2–8 and Luke 9:28–36—and the event is referred to in the Second Epistle of Peter (2 Peter 1:16–18) as well as possibly alluded in the first chapter of the Gospel of John (John 1:14).

=== Verse 1 ===
Now after six days Jesus took Peter, James, and John his brother, led them up on a high mountain by themselves.

In Luke's gospel, the account of the transfiguration of Jesus comes about eight days after the previous events. Protestant theologian Heinrich Meyer notes, in accordance with the observations of "Chrysostom, Jerome, Theophylact, Erasmus, and many others ... that Luke has included the dies a quo and ad quem" (i.e. inclusive of the days at the start and end of the interval).

=== Verse 2 ===
And He was transfigured before them. His face shone like the sun, and His clothes became as white as the light.

Some versions state "white as snow" rather than "white as the light". The Jerusalem Bible notes that the angel of the resurrection in Matthew 28:3 wore a robe which was "white as snow".

=== Verse 3 ===
Suddenly there appeared to them Moses and Elijah, talking with him.

Moses and Elijah are the only figures in the Old Testament who speak with God on Mount Sinai: see Exodus 33:11 and 1 Kings 19:8–18. Dale Allison comments that "their presence together makes us think of that mountain".

=== Verse 4 ===
And Peter said to Jesus, "Lord, it is good that we are here. If you wish, I will make three tents here, one for you and one for Moses and one for Elijah."

The "tents" refer to the "booths" or "tabernacles" familiar to Jesus and his disciples from the Jewish feast which they celebrated each year. Verna Holyhead suggests that Peter is grasping for something familiar to hold onto in the face of this otherwise unfamiliar experience.

== Coin in the fish's mouth (verses 24–27) ==
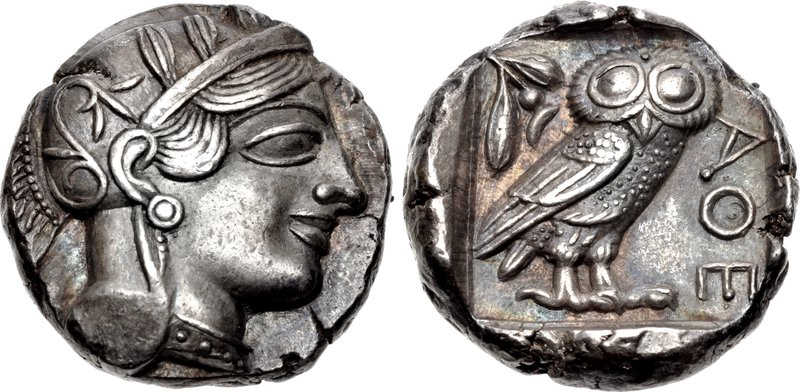
An Athenian tetradrachm from after 499 BCE

The coin in the fish's mouth is one of the miracles of Jesus, told in verses 24–27.

The four-drachma (or shekel) coin would be exactly enough to pay the temple tax (a two-drachma coin) for two people. It is usually thought to be a Tyrian shekel.

== See also ==
- Elijah
- Moses
- Parable of Jesus
- Simon Peter
- Tetradrachm
- Tilapia
- Related Bible parts: Exodus 30, Exodus 38, Mark 9, Luke 9

== Sources ==
- Lee, Dorothy (2004). Transfiguration. Bloomsbury Academic. ISBN 978-0-8264-7595-4.
- Lockyer, Herbert (1988). All the Miracles of the Bible. Harper Collins. ISBN 978-0-310-28101-6.
