= Exorcising a boy possessed by a demon =

One of the miracles attributed to Jesus

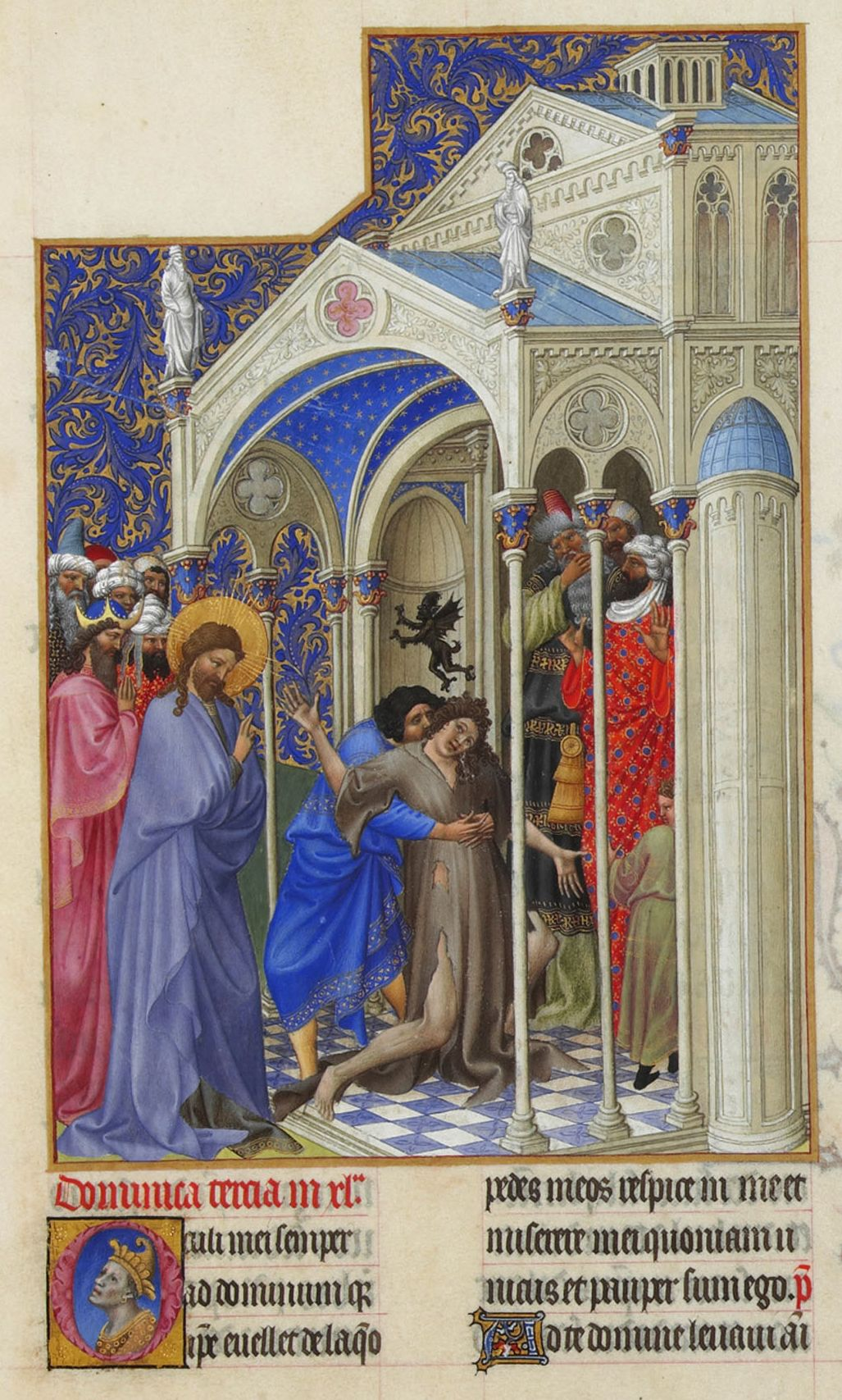
Exorcising a boy possessed by a demon from Très Riches Heures du Duc de Berry, 15th century

The exorcism of a boy possessed by a demon, or a boy with a mute spirit, is one of the miracles attributed to Jesus reported in the synoptic Gospels, involving the healing of a demonically possessed boy through exorcism. It is in all Synoptic Gospels: Mark 9:17–29, Matthew 17:14–21, Luke 9:40–44. In the Gospel narratives, this healing takes place following the Transfiguration.

== Narrative ==
Mark's account describes how Jesus is surrounded by a crowd, one of whom asks for help for his son, who "has a spirit that makes him unable to speak". He explains that the spirit makes him foam at the mouth, grind his teeth, and become rigid. He tells Jesus that he had asked the disciples to cure the boy, but they had been unable to do so. Jesus responds by describing the crowd and his followers as a "faithless generation", and asks "how much longer must I be among you?".

When he is brought to Jesus, the boy immediately experiences an epileptic seizure. Jesus asks the boy's father how long this has affected the child; the father replies that this had been since his childhood and asks Jesus to help if he can. Jesus tells him that everything is possible to one who believes, and the man responds, "I believe; help my unbelief!".

Jesus then commands the spirit to leave the boy, and it does. Seeing that he looks like a corpse, many in the crowd think he is dead, but Jesus helps him to his feet.

Afterwards, the disciples ask Jesus why they were unable to cure the boy and he explains, "This kind can come out only through prayer". Some sources add, "and through fasting".

The version in Matthew's gospel is considerably shorter, and drops the reference to a crowd and the need for prayer.

The version in Luke's gospel is also shortened, but mention of the crowd is retained.

== Commentary ==
The Pulpit Commentary notes that "the graphic description here of St. Mark corresponds exactly to epilepsy".

In Matthew's account it specifies that the boy is "moonstruck" (Greek: σεληνιάζεται, selēniazetai). This is translated as "a lunatic" in the Geneva Bible and in the King James Version ("lunatick") and as "an epileptic" in the New King James Version and the Revised Standard Version. Strong's Concordance states that the condition of epilepsy was "supposedly influenced by the moon".

In Matthew 17:17, Jesus complains, saying, "O faithless and twisted generation, how long am I to be with you?" (ESV) There is some debate as to whom the words were addressed. Origen believes these words were spoken to the nine Apostles who remained below, during the transfiguration, and that their faith was weak. So also Hilary of Poitiers who writes, “Whilst Christ had gone up upon the mountain with three of the Apostles, a kind of torpor of faith crept over the remaining nine, who were left with the people, both because they heard from the father of the lunatic, and saw with their own eyes the magnitude of the evil, and the violence and raging madness of the demon within him.” However Jerome, John Chrysostom, and Theophylact of Ohrid believe these words were spoken to the father, as well as to the Jews and Scribes. This view is supported by Mark 9:24, when the father says, "Lord, I believe; help my unbelief." But privately Christ rebukes the apostles since they had less faith than was needed for so great a work.

In terms of the words, this kind [of demon], John Chrysostom noted that these demons were of a higher order, and were more "powerful, obstinate and malicious." Thus they could only be driven out by prayer and fasting; since these things "lift men up from the flesh to God."

== Gallery of art ==
Depictions of Jesus healing the possessed boy

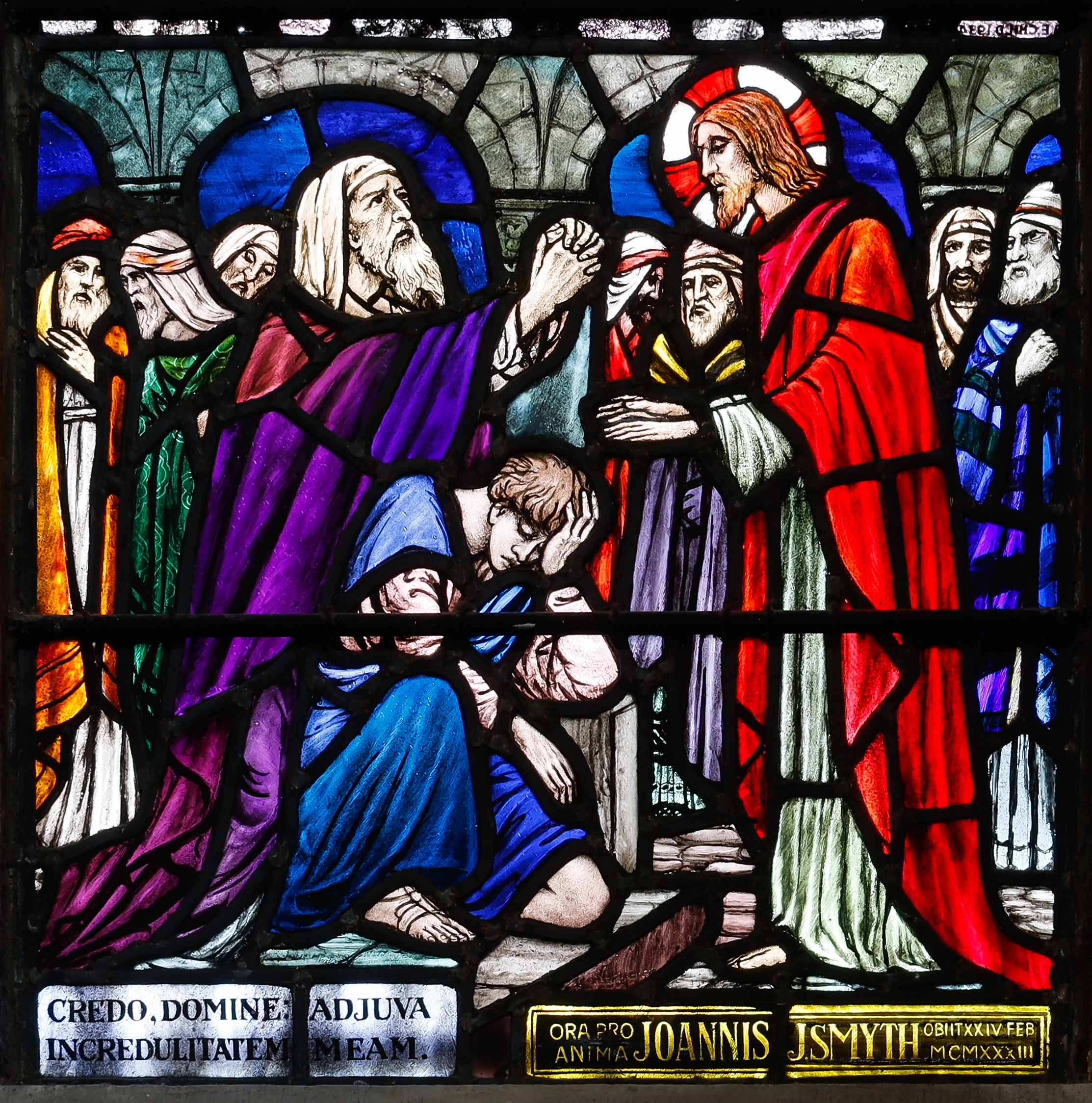
Lower panel of a stained glass window by Alfred Ernest Child in the east aisle, depicting the healing of the demon-possessed boy

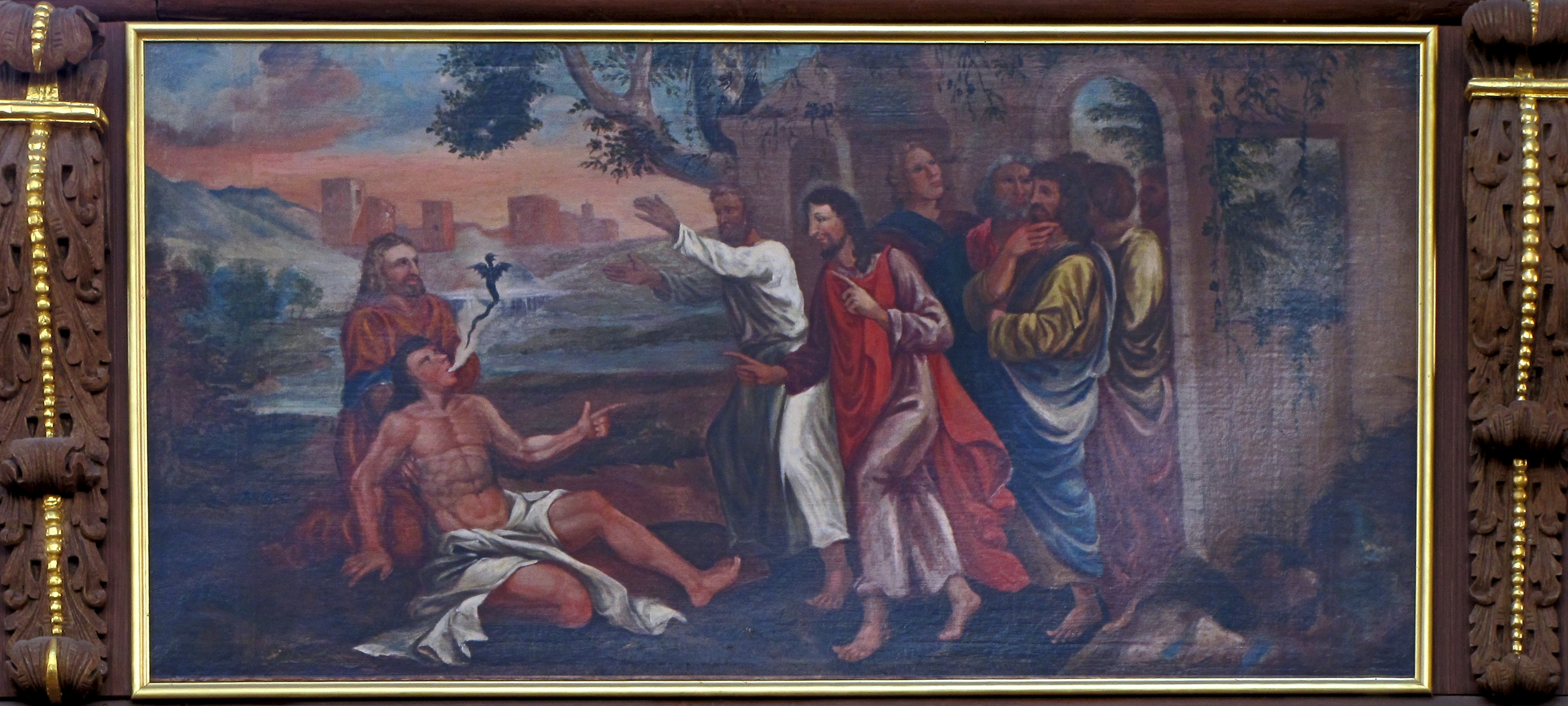
Painting (Wulcken Jean-Baptiste, Guérison du possédé) in Saint-Matthieu's church in Grand'Rue in Colmar (Haut-Rhin, France)

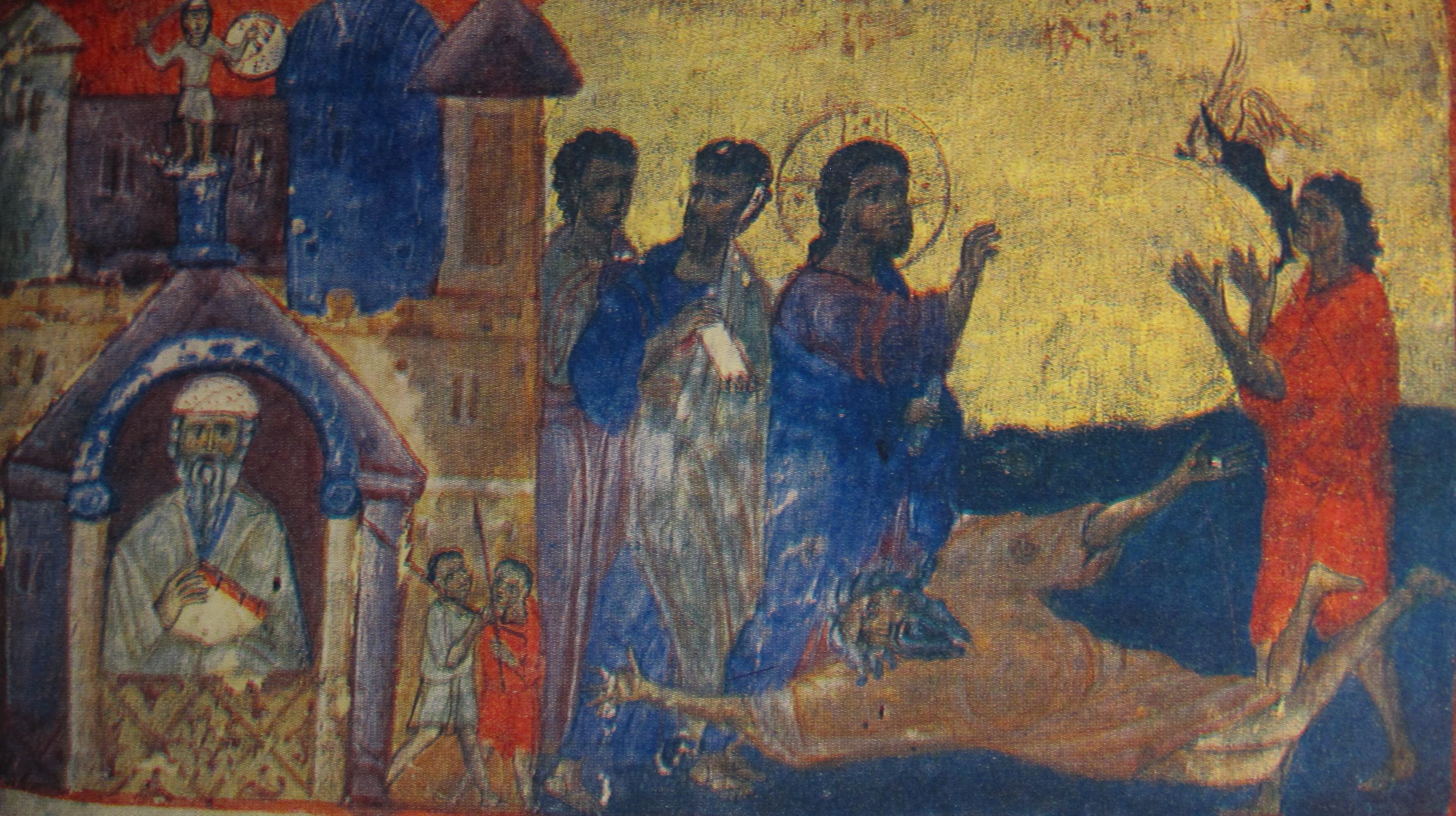
The Healing of the Possessed. A miniature from the Jruchi Gospels II, H-1667, 138r. National Center of Manuscripts, Tbilisi, Georgia (1667)

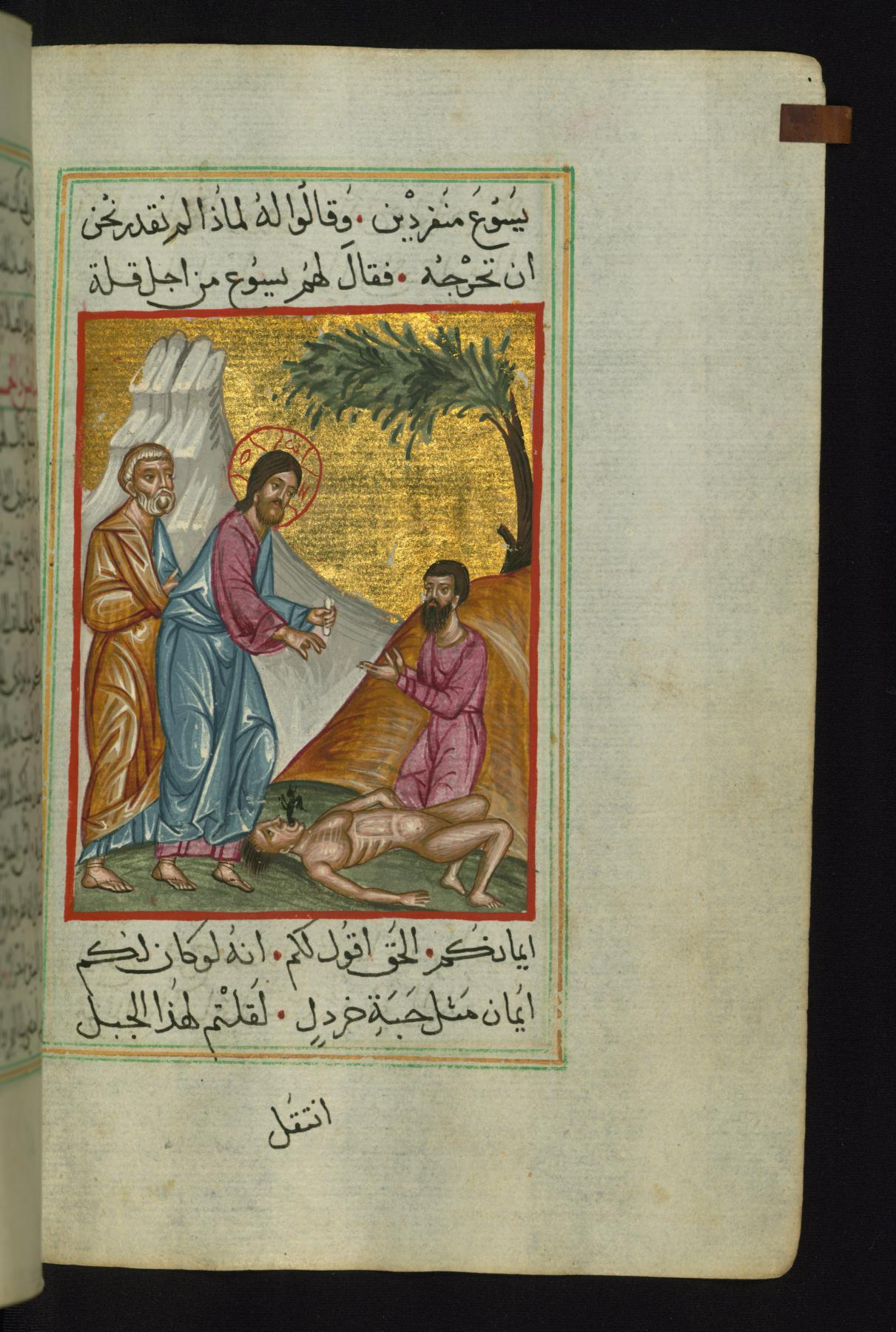
On this folio from Walters manuscript W.592, Jesus heals a demon-possessed boy.

== See also ==
- Miracles of Jesus
- Jesus exorcising a mute
- Exorcism of the Gerasene demoniac
- Epileptic seizure
- Exorcism
