= Matthew 10:8 =

- ← 10:7 10:9 →
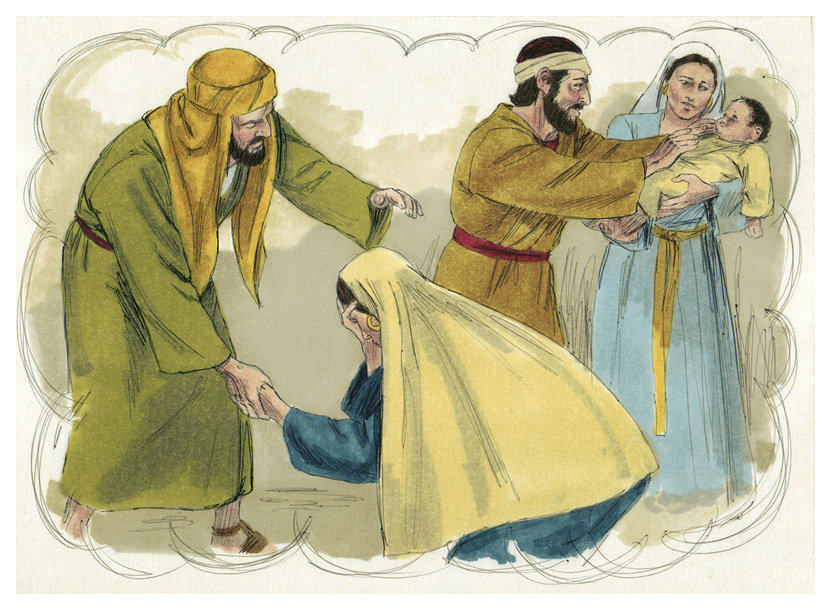
- The apostles heal the sick (Bible Illustrations by Sweet Media).
- Book: Gospel of Matthew
- Christian Bible part: New Testament

Matthew 10:8 is the eighth verse in the tenth chapter of the Gospel of Matthew in the New Testament.

== Content ==
The original Greek according to Westcott-Hort for this verse is:

Ἀσθενοῦντας θεραπεύετε, λεπροὺς καθαρίζετε, νεκροὺς ἐγείρετε, δαιμόνια ἐκβάλλετε· δωρεὰν ἐλάβετε, δωρεὰν δότε.

In the King James Version of the Bible the text reads:

Heal the sick, cleanse the lepers, raise the dead, cast out devils: freely ye have received, freely give.

The New International Version translates the passage as:

Heal the sick, raise the dead, cleanse those who have leprosy, drive out demons. Freely you have received, freely give.

== Analysis ==
Witham notes that this verse contains the third observation about the mission of the apostles, since Christ not only gave them the power to preach, but also to work miracles, so the miracles might give credibility to their words. It is said that Jesus does away with two vices, pride and avarice with this one command to freely give, since whatever they received is a gift of God, without any merit of their own, and so pride has no place. And second against avarice, because everything received must be freely given away.

== Commentary from the Church Fathers ==
Gregory the Great: "Miracles also were granted to the holy preachers, that the power they should show might be a pledge of the truth of their words, and they who preached new things should also do new things; wherefore it follows, Heal the sick, raise the dead, cleanse the lepers, cast out dæmons."

Jerome: " Lest peasants untaught and illiterate, without the graces of speech, should obtain credit with none when they announced the kingdom of heaven, He gives them power to do the things above mentioned, that the greatness of the miracles might approve the greatness of their promises."

Hilary of Poitiers: " The exercise of the Lord’s power is wholly entrusted to the Apostles, that they who were formed in the image of Adam, and the likeness of God, should now obtain the perfect image of Christ; and whatever evil Satan had introduced into the body of Adam, this they should now repair by communion with the Lord’s power."

Gregory the Great: "These signs were necessary in the beginning of the Church; the faith of the believers must be fed with miracles, that it might grow."

Chrysostom: " But afterwards they ceased when a reverence for the faith was universally established. Or, if they were continued at all, they were few and seldom; for it is usual with God to do such things when evil is increased, then He shows forth His power."

Gregory the Great: "The Holy Church daily doth spiritually, what it then did materially by the Apostles; yea, things far greater, inasmuch as she raises and cures souls and not bodies."

Saint Remigius: " The sick are the slothful who have not strength to live well; the lepers are the unclean in sin and carnal delights; the dæmoniacs are they that are given up under the power of the Devil."

Jerome: " And because spiritual gifts are more lightly esteemed when money is made the means of obtaining them, He adds a condemnation of avarice; Freely ye have received, freely give; I your Master and Lord have imparted these to you without price, do you therefore give them to others in like manner, that the free grace of the Gospel be not corrupted."

Glossa Ordinaria: "This He says, that Judas who had the bag might not use the above power for getting money; a plain condemnation of the abomination of the simoniacal heresy."

Gregory the Great: "For He knew before that there would be some that would turn the gift of the Spirit which they had received into merchandize, and pervert the power of miracles into an instrument of their covetousness."

Preceded by Matthew 10:7	Gospel of Matthew; Chapter 10	Succeeded by Matthew 10:9
