= Matthew 10:10 =

- ← 10:9 10:11 →
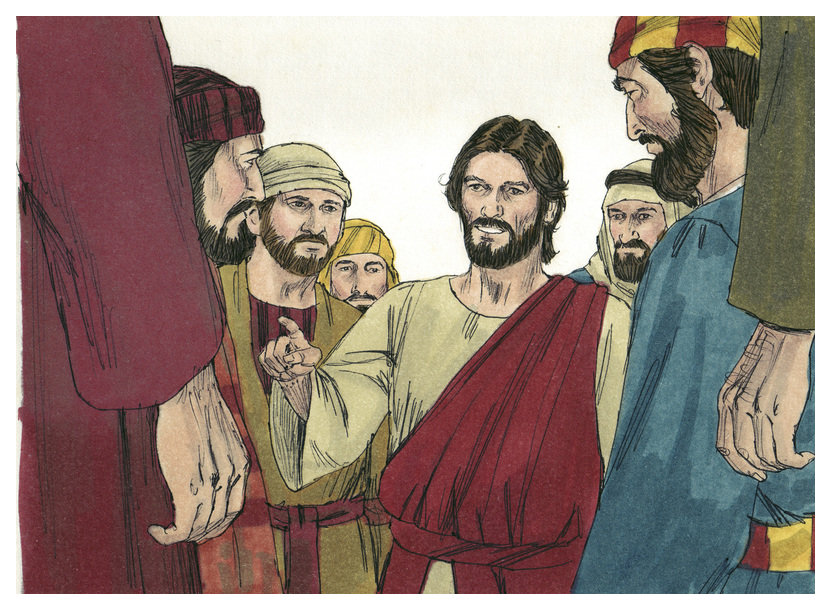
- Jesus Christ sent out the apostles to preach the gospel (Bible Illustrations by Sweet Media).
- Book: Gospel of Matthew
- Christian Bible part: New Testament

Matthew 10:10 is the tenth verse in the tenth chapter of the Gospel of Matthew in the New Testament.

== Content ==
In the original Greek, according to Westcott-Hort, this verse reads:

μὴ πήραν εἰς ὁδόν, μηδὲ δύο χιτῶνας, μηδὲ ὑποδήματα, μηδὲ ῥάβδον, ἄξιος γὰρ ὁ ἐργάτης τῆς τροφῆς αὐτοῦ ἐστιν.

In the King James Version of the Bible (KJV) the text reads:

Nor scrip for your journey, neither two coats, neither shoes, nor yet staves: for the workman is worthy of his meat.

The New International Version translates the passage as:

take no bag for the journey, or extra tunic, or sandals or a staff; for the worker is worth his keep.

Parallel passages can be found in Mark 6:8–9 and Luke 9:3.

== Analysis ==
The word for "bag" (KJV: "scrip") is "tarmil" in Hebrew, as found in one Jewish commentary, to call "a large leather bag", in which shepherds and travelers carried their food, and other things, hanging it around their necks. The disciples were told to carry neither money with them, nor any provisions for their journey. The Jerusalem Bible calls it a "haversack", while the Good News Translation speaks of a "beggar's bag".

"Two tunics" (KJV: "two coats", NABRE: "a second tunic") are supposedly one to wear during travel, and another to put on, when they came to their quarters. Theologian John Gill suggests that "the disciples were not allowed change of raiment, either because superfluous, or too magnificent to appear in, or too troublesome to carry".

In the Gospel of Mark only sandals are allowed. There seems to be a difference between "shoes" and "sandals", such as in the case of "plucking off the shoe", when a man refused his brother's wife. Sandals were made of harder leather than shoes, and sometimes of wood covered with leather, and stuck with nails, to make them more durable; though sometimes made of bulrushes, and bark of palm trees, and of cork, which were light to walk with. (Note: Says R. Bar bar Chanah, I saw R. Eleazar of Nineveh go out on a fast day of the congregation (Mev ldnob), "with a sandal of cork".) It is not certain which sort the disciples were allowed to travel with.

"Staffs" (KJV: "staves") denote "more than one staff", which was sufficient to assist and lean upon during the journey. According to Mark, one staff was allowed, as though they might take a traveling staff, but not staffs for defense or to fight with (Matthew 26:55). Several things were not to carry, partly because they would be burdensome to them in traveling; and partly because they were not to be out any long time, but were quickly to return again; and mainly to teach them to live and depend upon divine providence. Since they were to take neither money, nor provisions with them, and were also to preach the Gospel freely, they might reasonably ask how they should be provided for, and supported, as Jesus said, that they should not be anxiously concerned about that, as he would take care that they had a suitable supply and would so influence and dispose the minds of such, to whom they should minister, as that they should have all necessary provisions made for them, without any care or expense of theirs.

The phrase "for a worker is worthy of his food" (KJV: "for the workman is worthy of his meat") is used by Jesus as a proverbial expression to remark that the disciples are workmen, or laborers in his vineyard, and for doing their duty, they were entitled to all the necessaries of life.

There are divided opinions as to whether this ordinance for the apostles to be poor was just for this early time of preaching or should always be the case. However, Lapide believes that it was a temporary injunction. As proof he puts forth Luke 22:35, "When I sent you without bag and scrip and shoes, did you lack anything? And they said, Nothing. He said to them, But now..." showing that he was about to give them a new set of precepts, i.e., they should buy swords and take a bag. It is clear that during Jesus' ministry the apostles had pious and wealthy women who accompanied and provided for them (See 1 Corinthians 9:5, "Have we not power to carry about a woman, even as the other apostles?".) Christ also permitted Magdalen, and other pious women to accompany and provide for Himself and His followers (see Luke 8:3). Judas had the money bag, and the disciples make reference to the money they had when they ask Christ: “From where will we buy bread that these may eat?” However some missionary saints have taken this commandment to heart such as Francis Xavier who refused aid from the king of Portugal and begged for his food.

== Commentary from the Church Fathers ==
Glossa Ordinaria: "Whence He adds, Neither money in your purses. For there are two kinds of things necessary; one is the means of buying necessaries, which is signified by the money in their purses; the other the necessaries themselves, which are signified by the scrip."

Jerome: "In forbidding the scrip, neither scrip for your journey, He aimed at those philosophers commonly called Bactroperatæ, who being despisers of this world, and esteeming all things as nothing, yet carry a bag about with them. Nor two coats. By the two coats He seems to mean a change of raiment; not to bid us be content with a single tunic in the snow and frosts of Scythia, but that they should not carry about a change with them, wearing one, and carrying about the other as provision for the future. Nor shoes. It is a precept of Plato, that the two extremities of the body should be left unprotected, and that we should not accustom ourselves to tender care of the head and feet; for if these parts be hardy, it will follow that the rest of the body will be vigorous and healthy. Nor staff; for having the protection of the Lord, why need we seek the aid of a staff?"

Saint Remigius: "The Lord shows by these words that the holy preachers were reinstated in the dignity of the first man, who as long as he possessed the heavenly treasures, did not desire other; but having lost those by sinning, he straightway began to desire the other."

Chrysostom: "A happy exchange! In place of gold and silver, and the like, they received power to heal the sick, to raise the dead. For He had not commanded them from the beginning, Possess neither gold nor silver; but only then when He said at the same time, Cleanse the lepers, cast out dæmons. Whence it is clear that He made them Angels more than men, freeing them from all anxiety of this life, that they might have but one care, that of teaching; and even of that He in a manner takes away the burden, saying, Be not careful what ye shall speak. Thus what seemed hard and burdensome, He shows them to be light and easy. For nothing is so pleasant as to be delivered from all care and anxiety, more especially when it is possible, being delivered from this, to lack nothing, God being present, and being to us instead of all things."

Jerome: "As He had sent the Apostles forth unprovided and unencumbered on their mission, and the condition of the teachers seemed a hard one, He tempered the severity of the rules by this maxim, The labourer is worthy of his hire, i. e. Receive what you need for your food and clothing. Whence the Apostle says, Having food and raiment, let us therewith be content. (1 Tim. 6:8. Gal. 6:6.) And again, Let him that is catechized communicate unto him that catechizeth in all good things; that they whose disciples reap spiritual things, should make them partakers of their carnal things, not for the gratification of covetousness, but for the supply of wants."

Chrysostom: "It behoved the Apostles to be supported by their disciples, that neither they should be haughty towards those whom they taught, as though they gave all, and received nothing; and that the others, on their part, should not fall away, as overlooked by them. Also that the Apostles might not cry, He bids us lead the life of beggars, and should be ashamed thereat, He shows that this is their due, calling them labourers, and that which is given their hire. For they were not to suppose that because what they gave was only words, therefore they were to esteem it but a small benefit that they conferred; therefore He says, The labourer is worthy of his meat. This He said not to signify that the labours of the Apostles were only worth so much, but laying down a rule for the Apostles, and persuading those that gave, that what they gave was only what was due."

Augustine: "The Gospel therefore is not for sale, that it should be preached for reward. For if they so sell it, they sell a great thing for a small price. Let preachers then receive their necessary support from the people, and from God the reward of their employment. For the people do not give pay to those that minister to them in the love of the Gospel, but as it were a stipend that may support them to enable them to work."

Jerome: "Thus far we have expounded by the letter; but metaphorically, as we often find gold put for the sense, silver for the words, brass for the voice—all these we may say we are not to receive from others, but to have them given by the Lord. We are not to take up the teaching of heretics, of philosophers, and of corrupt doctrine."

Hilary of Poitiers: "The girdle is the making ready for the ministry, the girding up that we may be active in duty; we may suppose that the forbidding money in the girdle is to warn us from suffering any thing in the ministry to be bought and sold. We are not to have a scrip by the way, that is, we are to leave all care of our worldly substance; for all treasure on earth is hurtful to the heart, which will be there where the treasure is. Not two coats, for it is enough to have once put on Christ, nor after true knowledge of Him ought we to be clothed with any other garment of heresy or law. Not shoes, because standing on holy ground as was said to Moses not covered with the thorns and prickles of sin, we are admonished to have no other preparation of our walk than that we have received from Christ."

Jerome: "Or; The Lord herein teaches us that our feet are not to be bound with the chains of death, but to be bare as we tread on the holy ground. We are not to carry a staff which may be turned into a serpent, nor to trust in any arm of flesh; for all such is a reed on which if a man lean ever so lightly, it will break and go into his hand and pierce him."

Hilary of Poitiers: "Neither a staff; that is, We are not to seek rights of extraneous power, having a rod from the root of Jesse."

== Notes ==
Preceded by Matthew 10:9	Gospel of Matthew; Chapter 10	Succeeded by Matthew 10:11
