= Luke 9 =

- ← chapter 8 chapter 10 →
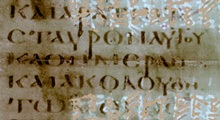
- Luke 9:23 in the Codex Nitriensis, written about AD 550.
- Book: Gospel of Luke
- Category: Gospel
- Christian Bible part: New Testament
- Order in the Christian part: 3

Luke 9 is the ninth chapter of the Gospel of Luke in the New Testament of the Christian Bible. It records the sending of the twelve disciples, several great miracles performed by Jesus, the story of his transfiguration, Peter's confession and the final departure from Galilee towards Jerusalem. Scottish minister William Robertson Nicoll describes this chapter as unfolding "sundry particulars which together form the closing scenes of the Galilean ministry". Early Christian tradition uniformly affirmed that Luke the Evangelist composed this Gospel as well as the Acts of the Apostles. Critical opinion on the tradition was evenly divided at the end of the 20th century.

== Text ==
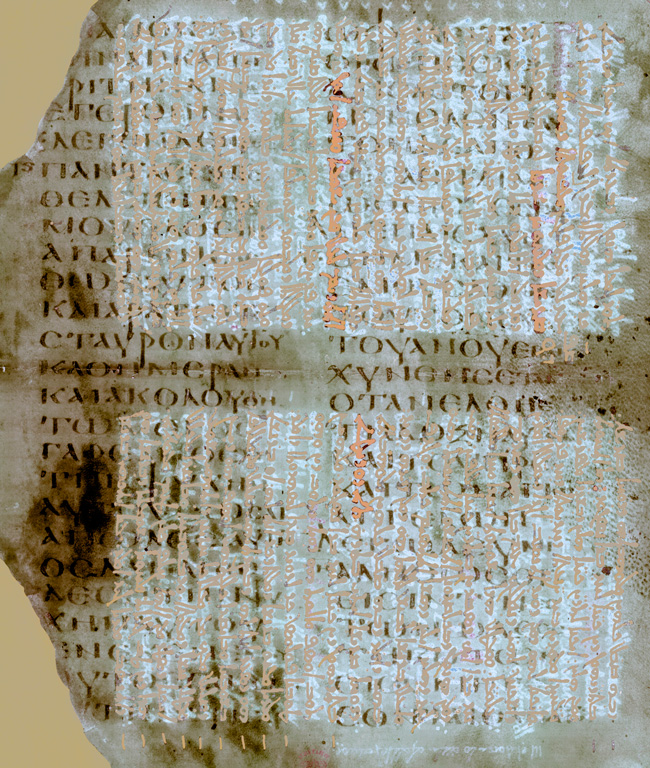
Luke 9:22–33 on the underwriting of the palimpsest on folio 20 recto in Codex Nitriensis (6th century).

The original text was written in Koine Greek. This chapter is divided into 62 verses. The text as far as verse 50 parallels the contents of the Gospels of Matthew and Mark, probably with Mark being the common source for the material, but from verse 51, in the words of the Jerusalem Bible, "Luke deserts Mark" and uses other material as far as Luke 18:14. Some early manuscripts containing the text of this chapter are:

- Papyrus 75 (AD 175–225)
- Papyrus 45 (~250)
- Codex Vaticanus (325–50)
- Codex Sinaiticus (330–60)
- Codex Bezae (~400)
- Codex Washingtonianus (~400)
- Codex Alexandrinus (400–40)
- Codex Ephraemi Rescriptus (~450).

== Time ==
American biblical writer Henry Hampton Halley states that between verses 17 and 18, about 8 months intervene.

== The mission of the twelve (verses 1–6) ==
=== Verse 1 ===
Then he [Jesus Christ] called his twelve disciples together, and gave them power and authority over all devils (or demons), and to cure diseases.

The Syriac version (only) reads "his own twelve". F. W. Farrar notes that Jesus commits to them both his power (capacity to act) and his authority (Greek: εξουσια, exousia, the right to act) over demons.

=== Verse 2 ===
He sent them to preach the kingdom of God and to heal the sick.

They are sent out "in pairs" in the parallel account in Mark's Gospel.

=== Verse 3 ===
And He said to them, "Take nothing for the journey, neither staffs nor bag nor bread nor money; and do not have two tunics apiece".

Cross reference: Matthew 10:10; Mark 6:8–9

- "Your journey" refers to the travel throughout the towns and cities, where they were sent to preach the Gospel.
- "Neither staffs" (KJV: "staves"): the Latin Vulgate version and all the Oriental versions render in the singular number, "neither staff, rod, or club"; and so it was in one of Theodore Beza's ancient copies, but in all the rest in the plural, as in Matthew; which last must be the true reading, since one staff was allowed, according as in (Mark 6:8) though more than one were forbidden.
- "Nor bag" (KJV: "scrip"): something to put provision in (cf. Matthew 10:10).
- "Nor money": not to bring gold, silver, or brass, to buy bread with, because they were to get food, wherever they came, be given as their due and the reward of their labor,
- "Two tunics apiece": the word "apiece" is omitted in one manuscript and not included in the Vulgate Latin and the eastern versions, which read as in (Matthew 10:10) though the word does aptly and clearly express the sense of the prohibition, that each man should not have two, or have change of raiment.

=== Verse 5 ===
And wherever they do not receive you, when you leave that town shake off the dust from your feet as a testimony against them.

Cyril of Jerusalem explains that "it is very improbable that those who despise the saving Word, and the Master of the household, will shew themselves kind to His servants, and seek further blessings".

== Herod seeks to see Jesus (verses 7–9) ==
=== Verse 7 ===
Now Herod the tetrarch heard of all that was done by Him; and he was perplexed, because it was said by some that John had risen from the dead...

Herod the Tetrarch was Herod Antipas. Mark 6:14 has the briefer words "When Herod heard". In his critical commentary, Heinrich Meyer suggests that Luke "evidently had [Mark] before him" and added "a definite object", namely "everything which was done", whereby is meant, "which was done by Jesus". Eric Franklin suggests that Herod's "perplexity" is recalled here as a "fitting prelude" to Jesus' discussion with his disciples about his identity in verses 18-20.

=== Verse 8 ===
... and by some that Elijah had appeared, and by others that one of the old prophets had risen again.

The Old Testament prophet Elijah is mentioned five times in this chapter, here and at verses 19, 30, 33 and (in some manuscripts) verse 54.

=== Verse 9 ===
Herod said, "John I have beheaded, but who is this of whom I hear such things?" So he sought to see Him.

Meyer suggests that a "glowing reception at court" might have awaited Jesus, but it did not materialise.

== The feeding of the 5 000 (verses 10–17) ==
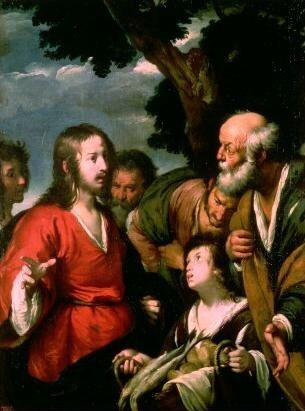
Feeding the multitudes by Bernardo Strozzi, early 17th century

This narrative, also known as the "miracle of the five loaves and two fish", records that five loaves and two fish were used by Jesus to feed a multitude (vv. 10–17). According to the Luke's narrative, when the twelve returned from their mission, Jesus withdrew with them by boat privately to a solitary place near Bethsaida. The crowds followed him on foot from the towns. When Jesus landed and saw a large crowd, he had compassion on them and healed their sick.

As evening approached, the disciples came to him and said, "This is a remote place, and it's already getting late. Send the crowds away, so they can go to the villages and buy themselves some food." Jesus said they do not need to go away therefore the disciples were to give them something to eat. They said they only had five loaves of bread and two fish then Jesus asked them to bring what they had to him. Jesus directed the people to sit down on the grass. Taking the five loaves and the two fish and looking up to heaven, he gave thanks and broke the loaves. Then he gave them to the disciples, and the disciples gave them to the people. They all ate and were satisfied, and the disciples picked up twelve basketfuls of broken pieces that were left over. The number of those who ate was about five thousand men (other gospels added "besides women and children").

== Peter's confession (verses 18–20) ==
He said to them, "But who do you say that I am?"

Peter answered and said, "The Christ of God".

Peter's answer to Jesus' question is often referred to as "Peter's confession". Presbyterian minister Marvin Vincent notes that "each evangelist gives Peter's confession differently".

== Predicts His passion, death and resurrection ==
In verses xxi–xxvii Jesus predicts his death and resurrection.

== The transfiguration ==
Verses xxviii–xxxvi narrate the Transfiguration of Jesus.

== Exorcism of a boy ==
Verses xxxvii–xlv show Jesus exorcising a boy possessed by a demon.

== The greater in the kingdom of heaven ==
Verses xlvi–xlvii is part of the teaching of Jesus about little children.

== Who is for us ==
Verses il–l.

== The journey to Jerusalem ==
=== Verse 51 ===
And it came to pass, when the time was come that he should be received up, he stedfastly set his face to go to Jerusalem,

The section from verse 51 of this chapter to Luke 19:28 contains an account of the "Perean and Later Judean Ministry", covering the period between Jesus' final departure from Galilee and the final week of his ministry. It took place partly in Perea, and partly Judea. Perea, east of Jordan, was in Herod's jurisdiction, whereas Judea, west of Jordan, was in Pilate's jurisdiction. The Jerusalem Bible refers to this lengthy section as "The Journey to Jerusalem". Luke's reference to Jesus being "received up", or "taken up to heaven", uses the word Greek: ἀναλήμψεως, analēmpseōs, which may be translated as "ascension" (New American Standard Bible) or as "assumption" (Douay-Rheims 1899 American Edition). This word differs from those used by Luke in Luke 24:51 and Acts 1:9 for Jesus' ascension into heaven forty days after his resurrection. The Jerusalem Bible refers to the "assumption of Jesus", embracing Jesus' last days of suffering and the beginning of his glory, and compares this to John's "more theological" terminology of Jesus being glorified (John 12:23 and elsewhere).

=== Verse 52 ===
And sent messengers before his face: and they went, and entered into a village of the Samaritans, to make ready for him.

Nicoll notes that it is sometimes referred to as the "Samaritan ministry": initially Jesus' disciples visit a Samaritan village (Luke 9:52), where they are not well-received, and they continue to "another village", probably back in Galilee. Farrar raised the possibility that the Samaritan village was En Gannim (Fountain of Gardens), now Jenin in the northern West Bank, "the first village at which [a traveler taking the road from Galilee to Judea over Mount Tabor] would arrive".

=== Verses 56 and 57 ===
In Luke 9:56–57, an anonymous person says to Jesus, "I will follow you wherever you go". In German, it became the title of a hymn "So nimm denn meine Hände" by Julie Hausmann, asking for guidance, and often used for funerals.

== See also ==
- Ministry of Jesus
- Miracles of Jesus
- Priamel
- Related Bible parts: Matthew 8, 10, 14, 16, 17, 18; Mark 6, 8, 9; John 6

Preceded by Luke 8	Chapters of the Bible; Gospel of Luke	Succeeded by Luke 10
