= Matthew 10:9 =

- ← 10:8 10:10 →
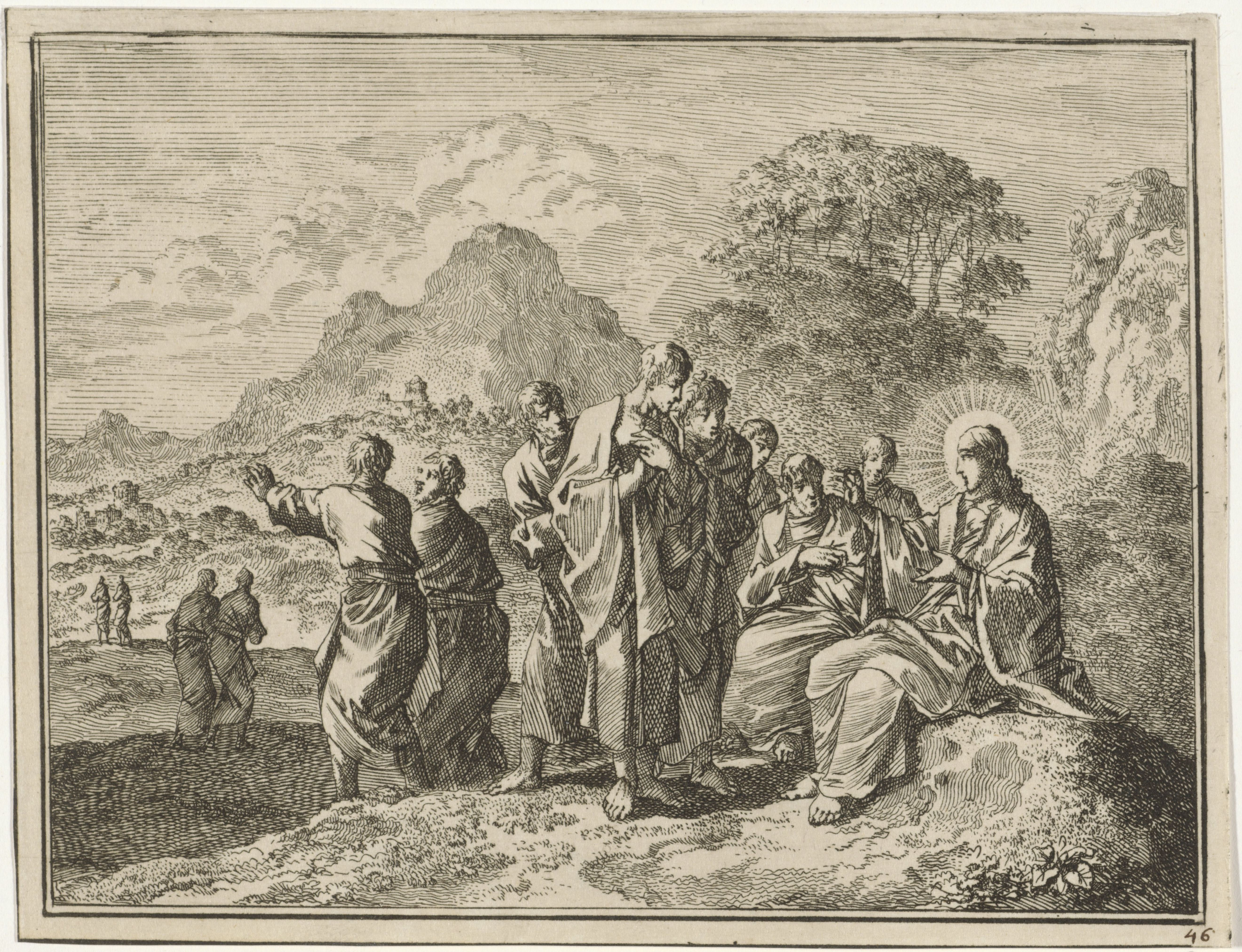
- Jesus Christ sent out the twelve apostles. Jan Luyken (1712).
- Book: Gospel of Matthew
- Christian Bible part: New Testament

Matthew 10:9 is the ninth verse in the tenth chapter of the Gospel of Matthew in the New Testament.

== Content ==
In the original Greek, according to Westcott-Hort, this verse reads:

Μὴ κτήσησθε χρυσόν, μηδὲ ἄργυρον, μηδὲ χαλκὸν εἰς τὰς ζώνας ὑμῶν,

In the King James Version of the Bible the text reads:

Provide neither gold, nor silver, nor brass in your purses,

The New International Version translates the passage as:

Do not take along any gold or silver or copper in your belts;

== Analysis ==
This is the fifth precept of Christ given to His Apostles, i.e. not to possess money. Lapide gives three possible reasons for this: 1) being free of earthly concerns they might rely solely on the providence of God; 2) have all their attention focused on preaching; 3) be an example of simplicity, poverty and contempt of riches, i.e. of an angelic life, that would draw people to them.

== Commentary from the Church Fathers ==
Chrysostom: "The Lord having forbidden to make merchandize of spiritual things, proceeds to pull up the root of all evil, saying, Possess neither gold, nor silver."

Jerome: "For if they preach without receiving reward for it, the possession of gold and silver and wealth was unnecessary. For had they had such, they would have been thought to be preaching, not for the sake of men’s salvation, but their own gain."

Chrysostom: "This precept then first frees the Apostles from all suspicions; secondly, from all care, so that they may give up their whole time to preaching the word; thirdly, teaches them their excellence. This is what He said to them afterwards, Was any thing lacking to you, when I sent you without bag or scrip?"

Jerome: "As He had cut off riches, which are meant by gold and silver, He now almost cuts off necessaries of life; that the Apostles, teachers of the true religion, who taught men that all things are directed by God’s providence, might show themselves to be without thought for the morrow."

Preceded by Matthew 10:8	Gospel of Matthew; Chapter 10	Succeeded by Matthew 10:10
