= Matthew 10:11 =

- ← 10:10 10:12 →
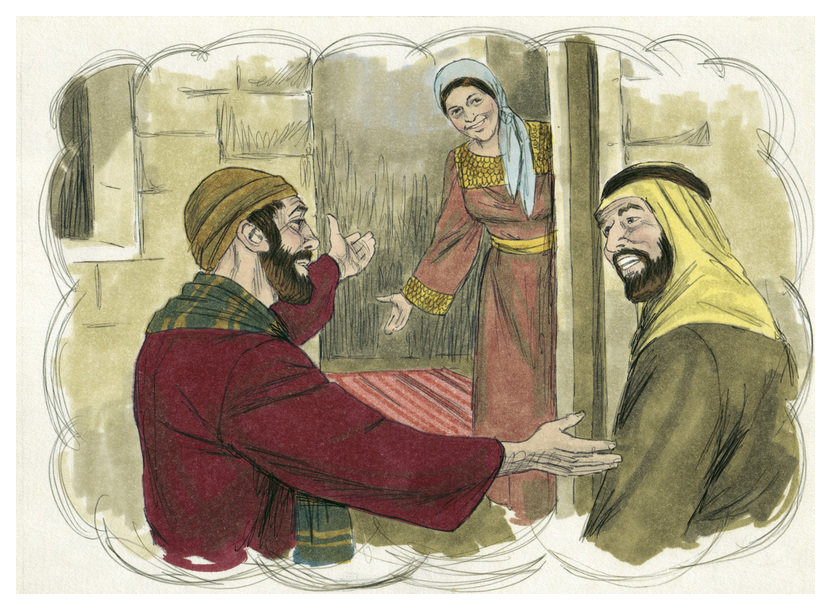
- The apostles were received by the people (Bible Illustrations by Sweet Media).
- Book: Gospel of Matthew
- Christian Bible part: New Testament

Matthew 10:11 is the eleventh verse in the tenth chapter of the Gospel of Matthew in the New Testament.

== Content ==
In the original Greek, according to Westcott-Hort, this verse reads:

Εἰς ἣν δ᾿ ἂν πόλιν ἢ κώμην εἰσέλθητε, ἐξετάσατε τίς ἐν αὐτῇ ἄξιός ἐστι· κἀκεῖ μείνατε, ἕως ἂν ἐξέλθητε.

In the King James Version of the Bible the text reads:

And into whatsoever city or town ye shall enter, enquire who in it is worthy; and there abide till ye go thence.

The New International Version translates the passage as:

"Whatever town or village you enter, search for some worthy person there and stay at his house until you leave.

== Analysis ==
This is the sixth precept Jesus gives to his disciples. Witham gives three possible reasons for it: 1) that they not disturb those whom they left, 2) that they avoid the accusation of inconstancy, 3) that they not commit gluttony from being guests of many people. He also postulates that they inquire who is worthy so that they avoid being associated with "bad characters". However this seems to be contradicted by Christ entering into the house of Zacchaeus, but it said that Zacchaeus was made worthy by his conversion.

== Commentary from the Church Fathers ==
Chrysostom: "The Lord had said above, The workman is worthy of his meat; that they should not hence suppose that He would open all doors to them, He here commands them to use much circumspection in the choice of a host, saying, Into what city or town ye enter, enquire who in it is worthy."

Jerome: "The Apostles, on entering a strange town, could not know of each inhabitant what sort of man he was; they were to choose their host therefore by the report of the people, and opinion of the neighbours, that the worthiness of the preacher might not be disgraced by the ill character of his entertainer."

Chrysostom: "How then did Christ Himself abide with the publican? Because he was made worthy by his conversion; for this command that he should be worthy, had respect not to their rank, but to their furnishing food. For if he be worthy he will provide them with food, especially when they need no more than bare necessaries. Observe how though He stripped them of all property, He supplied all their wants, suffering them to abide in the houses of those whom they taught. For so they were both themselves set free from care, and convinced men that it was for their salvation only that they had come, seeing they carried nothing about with them, and desired nothing beyond necessaries. And they did not lodge at all places indiscriminately, for He would not have them known only by their miracles, but much more by their virtues. But nothing is a greater mark of virtue, than to discard superfluities."

Jerome: "One host is chosen who does not so much confer a favour upon him who is to abide with him, as receive one. For it is said, Who in it is worthy, that he may know that he rather receives than does a favour."

Preceded by Matthew 10:10	Gospel of Matthew; Chapter 10	Succeeded by Matthew 10:12
