= Coin in the fish's mouth =

Miracle carried out by Jesus according to the Bible

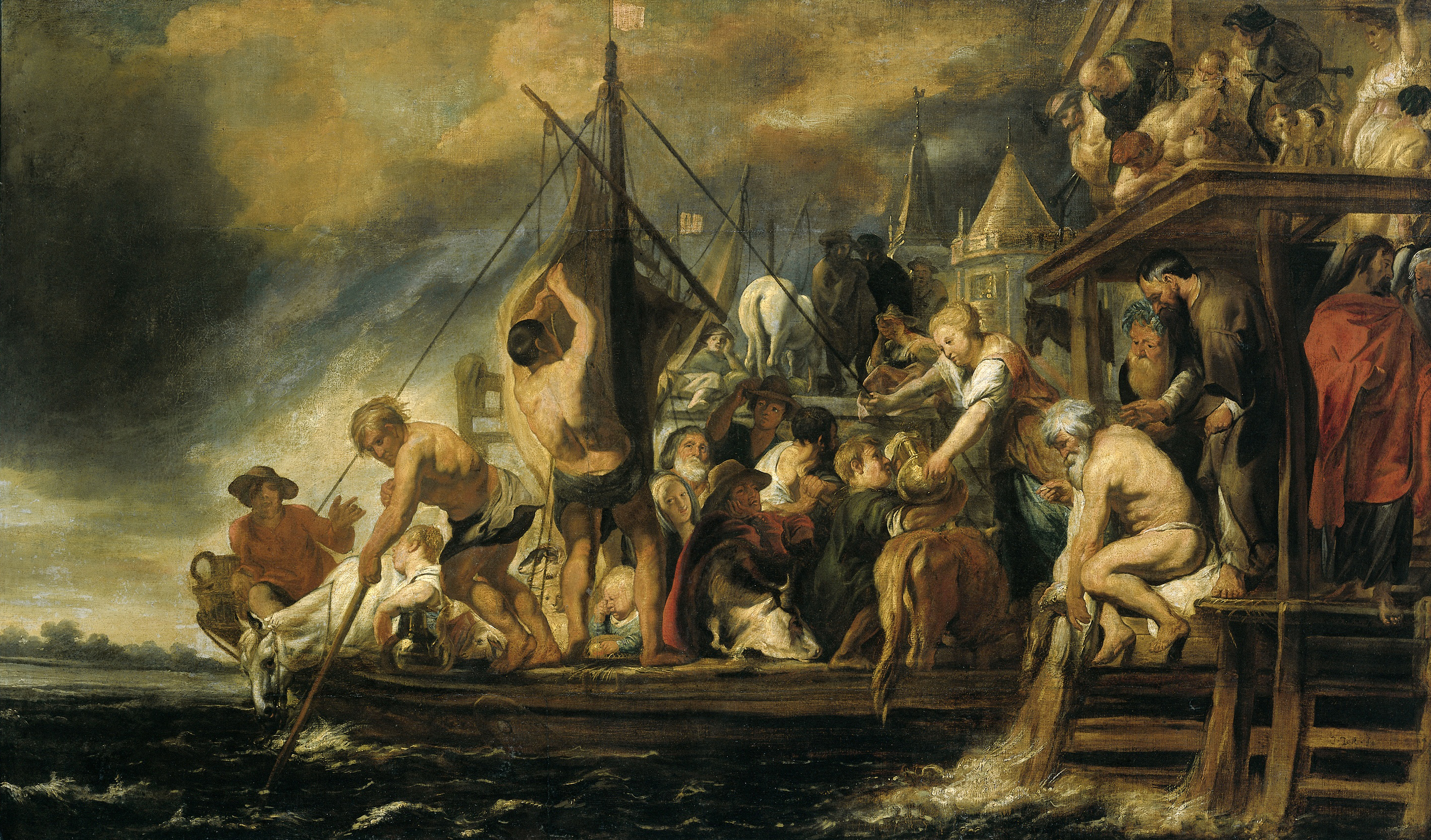
Peter Finds the Silver Coin in the Fish's Mouth by Jacob Jordaens, c. 1638

The coin in the fish's mouth is one of the miracles of Jesus, recounted in the Gospel of Matthew 17:24–27.

== Biblical account ==
In Matthew's account, in Capernaum, the collectors of the two-drachma temple tax ask Peter whether his teacher pays the tax, and Peter replies "Yes." When Peter returns to where they are staying, Jesus speaks of the matter, asking Peter's opinion: "From whom do the kings of the earth collect duty and taxes, from their own children or from others?" Peter answers, "from others", and Jesus replies: "Then the children are exempt. But so that we may not cause offense, go to the lake [the Sea of Galilee] and throw out your line. Take the first fish you catch; open its mouth and you will find a four-drachma coin. Take it and give it to them for my tax and yours."

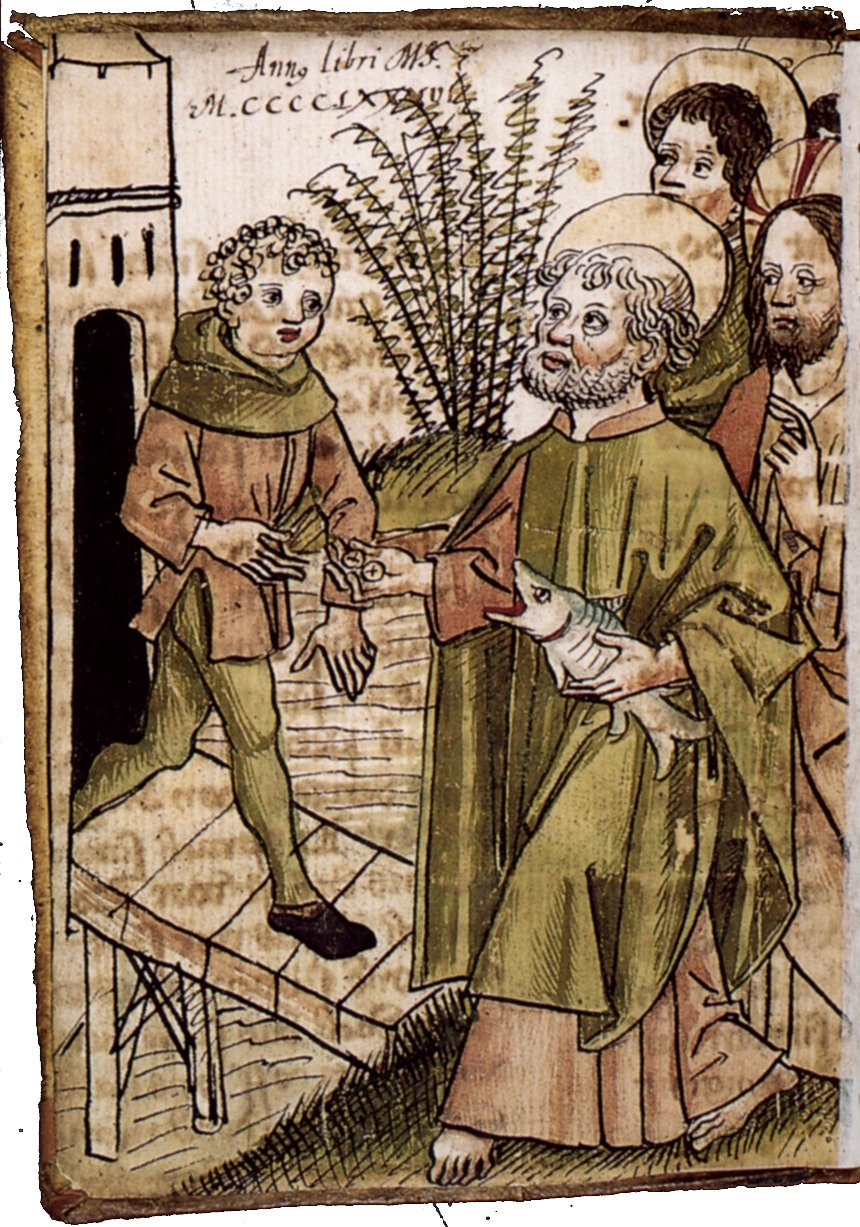
The Apostle Peter paying the temple tax with the coin from the fish's mouth, by Augustin Tünger, 1486

For the New International Version's word "others", the New King James Version reads "strangers" and the Good News Translation reads "foreigners". Albert Barnes argues that "strangers" does not mean "foreigners", but "those that were not their own sons or members of their family".

== Analysis ==
Heinrich Meyer suggests that Peter's assertion "Yes" makes it "clear that Jesus had hitherto been in the habit of paying the tax".

The story ends without recounting whether Peter caught the fish as Jesus predicted, nor does the text specify the species of the fish involved.

In the dialogue between Peter and Jesus, the latter urges Peter to pay the tax so that they do not offend those in charge of collecting the temple tax. This is the only miracle recorded in the gospels where Jesus declares to perform it in order to avoid offending certain people. Jesus' statement that "the children are exempt" is one of many statements where Jesus describes his followers and himself as being part of a spiritual family. Some interpretations of this passage indicate that Christians should not pay the traditional church tithe. Some interpretations of Peter's reply "from others" indicate that the church tithe should come from non-Christian church visitors.

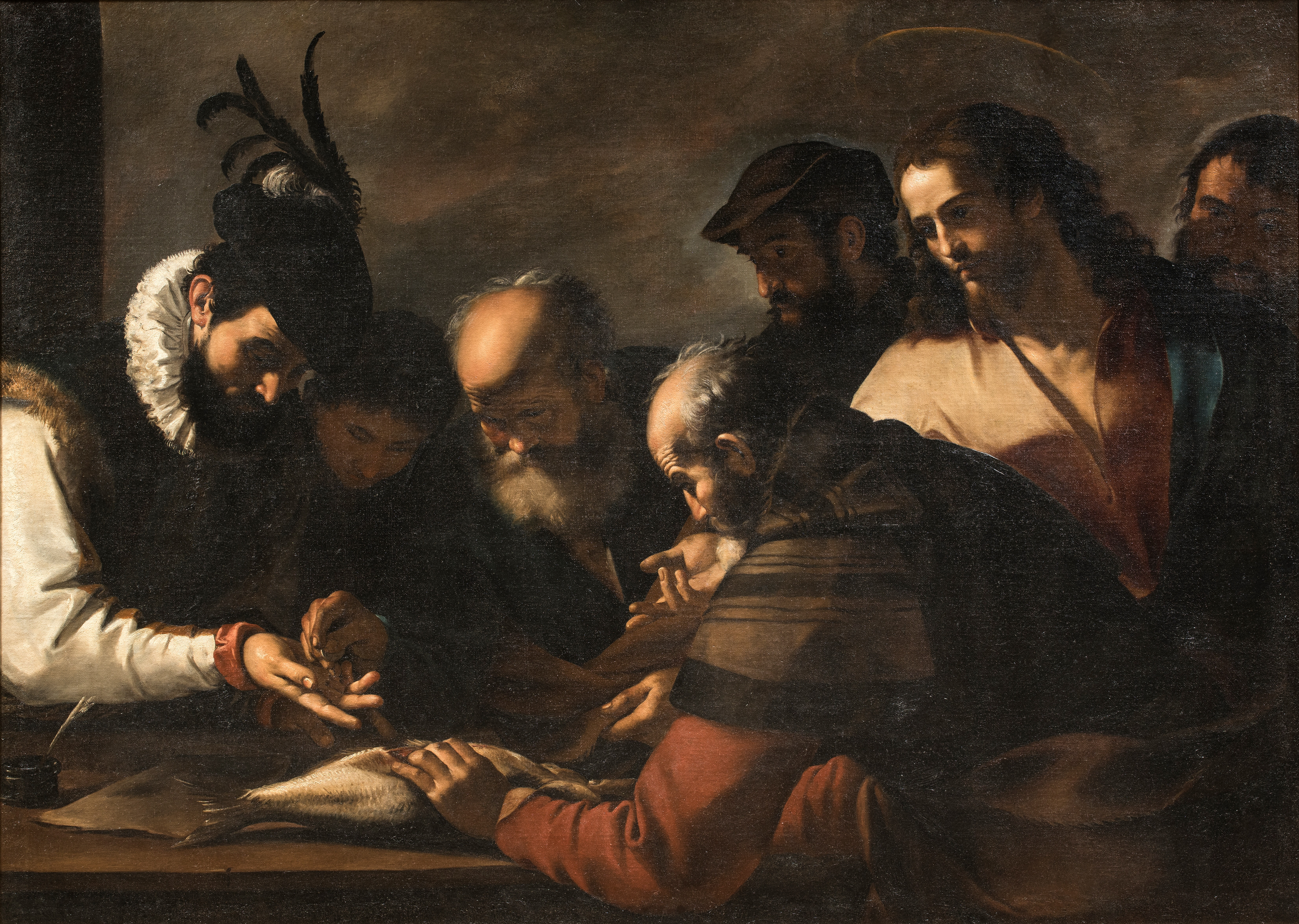
Peter Finds the Silver Coin in the Fish's Mouth by Mattia Preti, c. 1640

The four-drachma (or shekel) coin would be exactly enough to pay the temple tax for two people. It is usually thought to be a Tyrian shekel.

Jesus' views on the payment of the temple tax are consistent with his teachings regarding the physical temple. The Gospels record five times when he either says, "dismantle this temple, and in three days I will rebuild it," or is quoted as saying this. Jesus may have said this to emphasize a spiritual temple over the physical temple.

The coin in the fish's mouth is generally seen as a symbolic act or sign, but there is little agreement concerning what it signifies.

== History of the didrachma tribute ==
The temple tax (מחצית השקל, lit. 'half shekel') was a tax paid by Israelites and Levites which went towards the upkeep of the Jewish Temple.

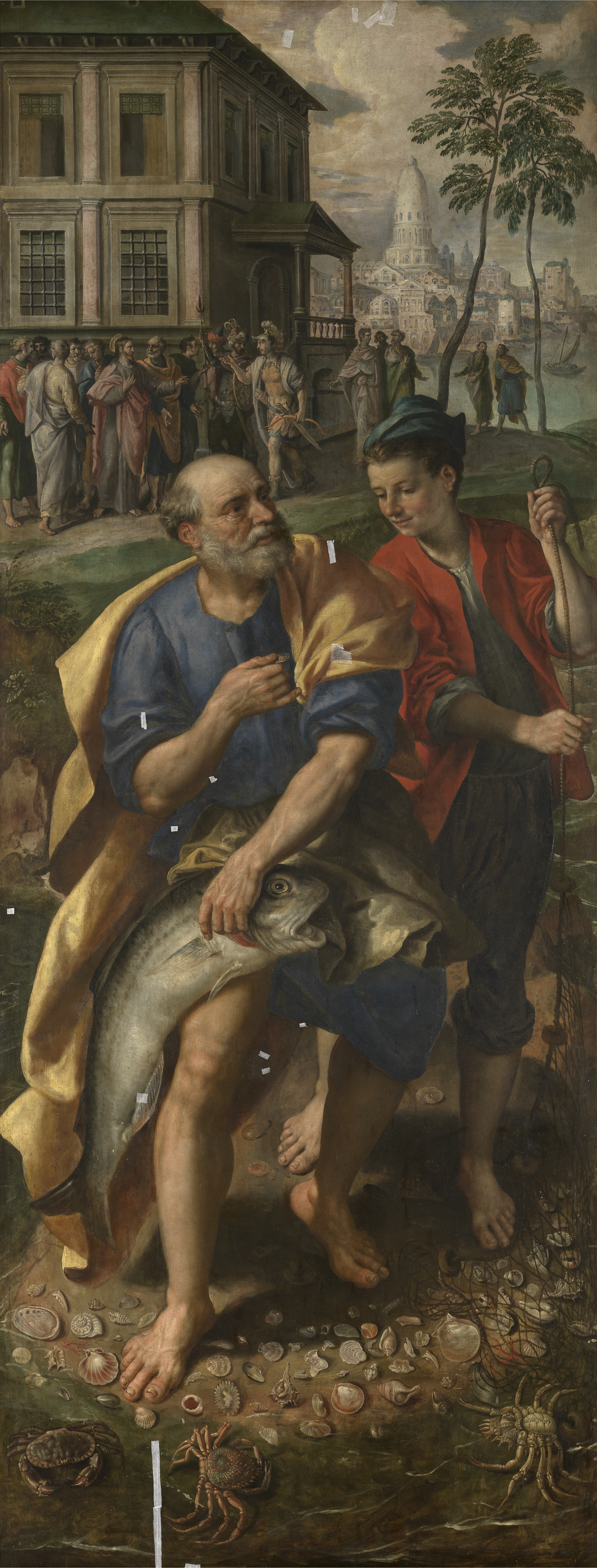
Peter Finding the Silver Coin in the Mouth of the Fish by Maerten de Vos, 1602

The Jews disliked paying tribute to the Romans. This sentiment around the time of Christ, resulted in the sect of the Galilæans, led by Judas of Galilee, who refused to pay tribute to Caesar. He encouraged Jews not to register, and those who did were targeted by his followers. Christ and his apostles were suspected of being members of this sect, since they were from Galilee, and preached a new, heavenly kingdom. St. Jerome, Bede and others are of the opinion that in order therefore that Christ might show the baselessness of this charge, he paid the didrachma. The collectors of the tribute did not try to ask Christ for it, because of the great report of his sanctity and miracles, and instead asked Peter.

== See also ==
- Render unto Caesar
- Life of Jesus in the New Testament
- Miracles of Jesus
