= Matthew 10:7 =

- ← 10:6 10:8 →
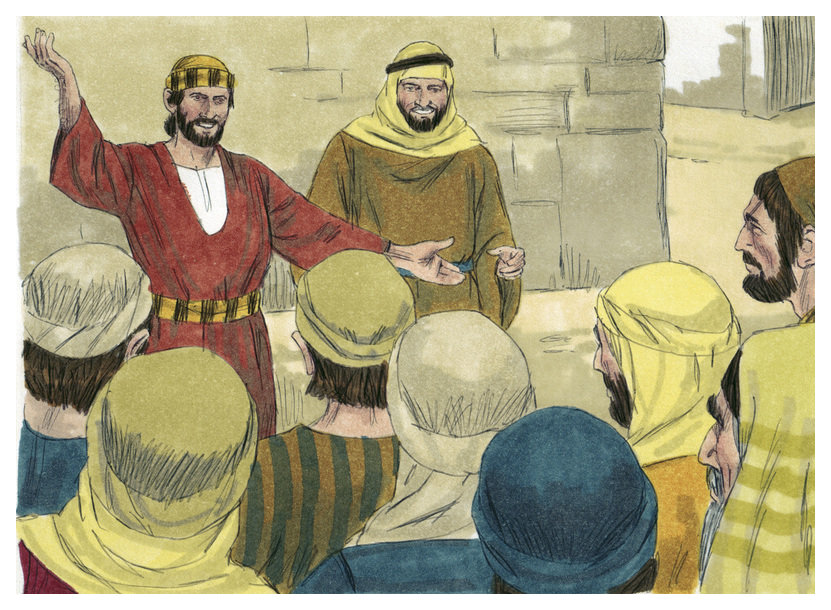
- The apostles preach the gospel of Christ (Bible Illustrations by Sweet Media).
- Book: Gospel of Matthew
- Christian Bible part: New Testament

Matthew 10:7 is the seventh verse in the tenth chapter of the Gospel of Matthew in the New Testament.

== Content ==
In the original Greek according to Westcott-Hort this verse is:

Πορευόμενοι δὲ κηρύσσετε, λέγοντες ὅτι Ἤγγικεν ἡ βασιλεία τῶν οὐρανῶν.

In the King James Version of the Bible the text reads:

And as ye go, preach, saying, The kingdom of heaven is at hand.

The New International Version translates the passage as:

As you go, preach this message: 'The kingdom of heaven is near.'

== Analysis ==
Robert Witham notes that this message is radically new. Before prophets spoke of earthy things but here instead the apostles are commanded only to speak of heavenly.

== Commentary from the Church Fathers ==
Glossa Ordinaria: "Having told them to whom they should go, He now introduces what they should preach; Go and preach, saying, The kingdom of heaven is at hand."

Rabanus Maurus: " The kingdom of heaven is here said to draw nigh by the faith in the unseen Creator which is bestowed upon us, not by any movement of the visible elements. The saints are rightly denoted by the heavens, because they contain God by faith, and love Him with affection."

Chrysostom: " Behold the greatness of their ministry, behold the dignity of the Apostles. They are not to preach of any thing that can be an object of sense, as Moses and the Prophets did; but things new and unlooked for; those preached earthly goods, but these the kingdom of heaven and all the goods that are there."

Preceded by Matthew 10:6	Gospel of Matthew; Chapter 10	Succeeded by Matthew 10:8
