= Temple tax =

Ancient Jewish religious practice

The Temple tax (מחצית השקל, lit. 'half shekel') was a tax paid by Jews in and beyond the Land of Israel for the upkeep of the Jewish Temple. Traditionally, Kohanim (Jewish priests) were exempt from the tax. Following the destruction of the Temple, Jews in the diaspora continued to send a voluntary contribution to the Nasi, in addition to the coerced Fiscus Judaicus tax.

== Hebrew Bible ==
In later centuries, the half-shekel was adopted as the amount of the Temple tax, although in Nehemiah 10:32–34 the tax is given as a third of a shekel.

This is what each one who is registered shall give: half a shekel according to the shekel of the sanctuary (the shekel is twenty gerahs), half a shekel as an offering to the Lord.

— Exodus 30:13 NRSV

A Tyrian shekel contained 13.1 g of pure silver; at a spot valuation of US$28/ozt in 2021, worth about $12.

== First Temple era ==
In the First temple era, Judean pilgrims to Jerusalem paid a Temple tax of a half-shekel before ascending the Temple Mount. This was paid in silver ingots weighing a half-shekel, measured against a beka stone counterweight, as half-shekel coins were not yet in use.

== Second Temple era ==
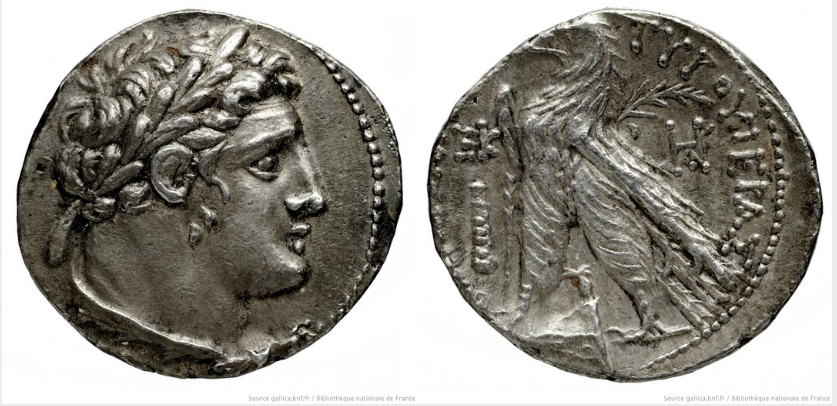
A Tyrian half-shekel minted around 102–101 BCE. Because of its high silver purity, it was the standard coin used by Jews to pay the annual Temple tax.

After the return from Babylonian captivity, Jews throughout the diaspora continued to pay the Temple tax. The funds were gathered locally and brought to Jerusalem once a year by specially appointed envoys. According to Josephus, "all the Jews throughout the habitable earth, and those that worshipped God; nay even those of Asia and Europe sent their contributions to it; and this from very ancient times" (Ant. 14.110). He also reports that at the end of the 30s CE "many tens of thousands" of Babylonian Jews guarded the convoy taking the tax to Jerusalem (Ant. 18.313).

The first Roman attempt to halt payments of the tax was made long before the First Jewish-Roman War on account of customs controls. The Senate had forbidden the export of gold and silver, but the Jews of Italy continued to pay the Temple tax. In 62 BCE, L. Valerius Flaccus, governor of the province of Asia, issued an edict forbidding the Jews of his province from sending the tax to Jerusalem. By 1 BCE, the tax was exempted from Roman prohibitions against exporting money to foreign states.

== New Testament ==
The tax is mentioned in the Gospel of Matthew in the New Testament, when Jesus and his disciples are in Capernaum. The collectors of the temple tax (Greek: δίδραχμα, didrachma) come to Peter and say "Does your teacher not pay the temple tax?" The narrative, which does not appear in the other gospels, leads to a discussion between Jesus and Peter about payment of the taxes levied by the "kings of the earth", and the miracle according to which Peter finds a stater (Greek: στατήρα), in the mouth of a fish, which is used to pay the tax due for both of them. The stater "was reckoned as equal to four drachmæ, and would therefore pay the didrachma both for Peter and his Master".

Although the word "temple" does not appear in this text, the King James Version translates it to "tribute", but it is certainly "the tax inaugurated by God in the wilderness" in Exodus 30:11–16. In the New English Translation the same Greek word (Greek: δίδραχμα, didrachma) is translated first as "temple tax" and second as "double-drachma" to strongly infer its meaning.

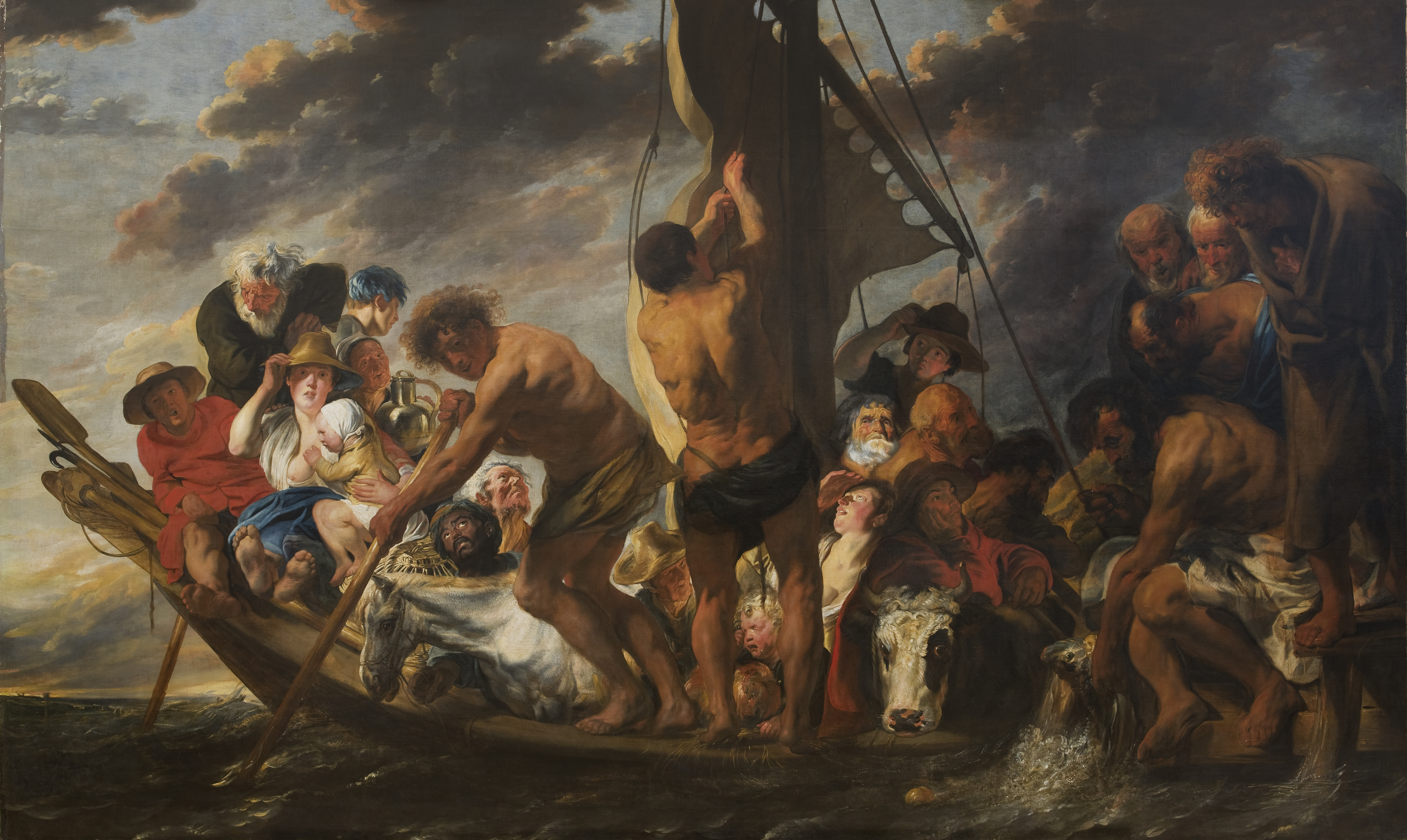
Peter Finds the Stater in the Mouth of the Fish by Jacob Jordaens

== After the destruction of the Temple ==
=== Fiscus Judaicus ===
After the destruction of the Temple in Jerusalem in 70 CE, the Temple tax was converted into the Fiscus Judaicus, which was imposed on the Jews and used for the upkeep of the temple of Jupiter Capitolinus.

=== Patriarchal Tax ===
Despite the destruction of the Temple, Jewish diaspora communities eventually resumed sending a voluntary annual contribution to the Land of Israel, called the d'mei k'lila (דמי כלילא, collection of the Sages). These funds supported the Nasi, based in the Galilee, and were collected by emissaries across the Diaspora.

The practice was banned by Roman law in 363CE, and again in 399 CE. It was reinstated in 404 CE. In 429 CE, following the abolition of the Patriarchate, the Byzantine emperor compelled local Jewish leaders to continue collecting this annual tax and surrender it to the imperial treasury under threat of force. Any funds already collected during the interim period were retroactively seized by the state.
