= The Tribute Money (Jordaens) =

Painting by Jacob Jordaens

The Tribute Money. Peter Finding the Silver Coin in the Mouth of the Fish
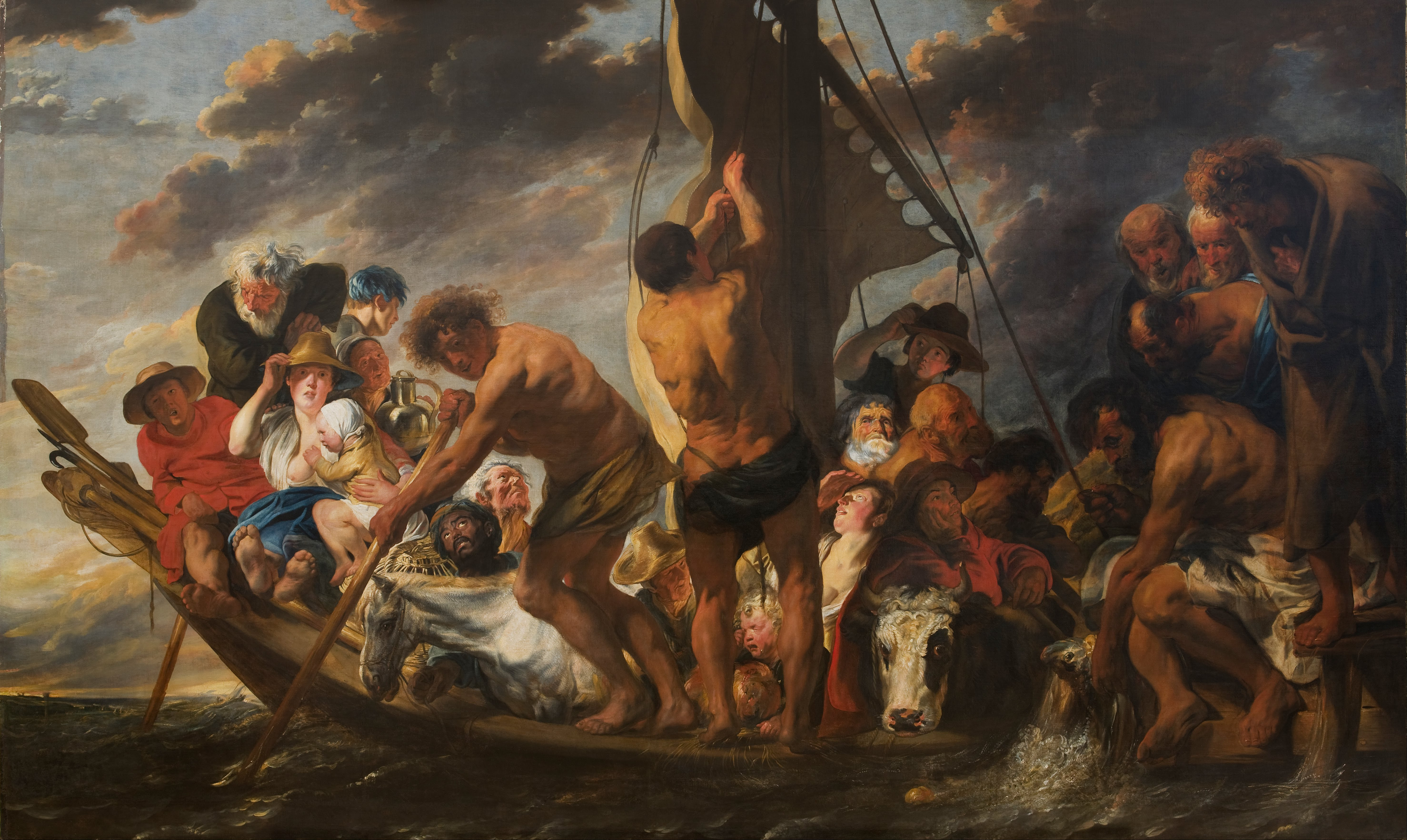
- Artist: Jacob Jordaens
- Year: 1616–1634
- Type: Oil on canvas
- Dimensions: 279.5 cm × 467 cm (110.0 in × 184 in)
- Location: National Gallery of Denmark, Copenhagen

The Tribute Money. Peter Finding the Silver Coin in the Mouth of the Fish is an oil painting by Flemish artist Jacob Jordaens created some time between 1616 and 1634. It is in the collection of the National Gallery of Denmark in Copenhagen (Inventory number KMS3198). It depicts the story of Jesus sending the apostle Peter to find a silver coin in the mouth of a fish as recounted in the Gospel according to Matthew 17:24-27. The composition was referred to as the "Ferry Boat to Antwerp" by the 17th-century German art historian and painter Joachim von Sandrart who interpreted the composition as a genre scene showing the ferry boat to Antwerp setting off from the jetty.

== Description ==
The painting is derived from the story in Matthew 17:24-27 which recounts Jesus asking the apostle to go to the lake at Capernaum to throw out his line and open the mouth of the first fish he would catch. Jesus assures Peter he will find a four-drachma coin in the fish's mouth. The coin was needed to pay the local temple tax, which every Israelite was required to pay to the temple in Jerusalem. The Gospel story does not itself recount the story of Peter following up on Jesus' instruction and catching the fish.

Jordaens has depicted the biblical scene as an event occurring in 17th-century Flanders. The composition shows two groups of people: on the left people are on a ferryboat which is setting off and on the right is a group with a man (Saint Peter) pulling a fish from the water and looking at the coin he has found in its mouth. Only the apostles on the right surrounding Peter are concerned with him and his find. All passengers on the ferry are just minding their own business and do not pay any attention to the miraculous find that is occurring on the jetty. The gunwale of the ferryboat is only just clear of the water as the boat is heavily loaded with animals and passengers of all ages and nationalities. Within the group on the boat can be distinguished a man hoisting the sail and another one pushing the boat from the jetty with an oar. They are stocky, muscular men solely wearing loincloths. Behind them watching their work and huddled together are several persons, one of them a child crying because his apple has fallen into the water. The group on the boat includes an African man, possibly a trader, in an exotic turban and with a white horse. The sky is covered with dark clouds. It must be windy as there are high waves on the river and a boat in the distance seems to be struggling. Two persons on the ferry are holding the rims of their hats to prevent them from flying away as the boat violently sets off. The scene on the boat with its lively crowd is the centre piece of the composition. It overshadows the scene on the right which is being watched from the boat by a peasant leaning on his cow. He is the only one who is not affected by the violent jerk, because he is witnessing the miraculous event on the jetty. He is looking at the large coin which a swarthy fisherman holds in his hand after finding it in the mouth of a large fish which he is still holding with his other hand. This almost naked fisherman is sitting on the jetty while four men who are no different from the rest of the people in the boat, either, are bending over him to see the coin, with expressions of amazement.

The painting is a very decorative piece, with figures who are clearly distinguished in character and posture. The groups are well composed and connected. The scene is lively and full of movement. The brushwork is rather superficial and the light and palette are varied and harmonious.

== History of the painting ==
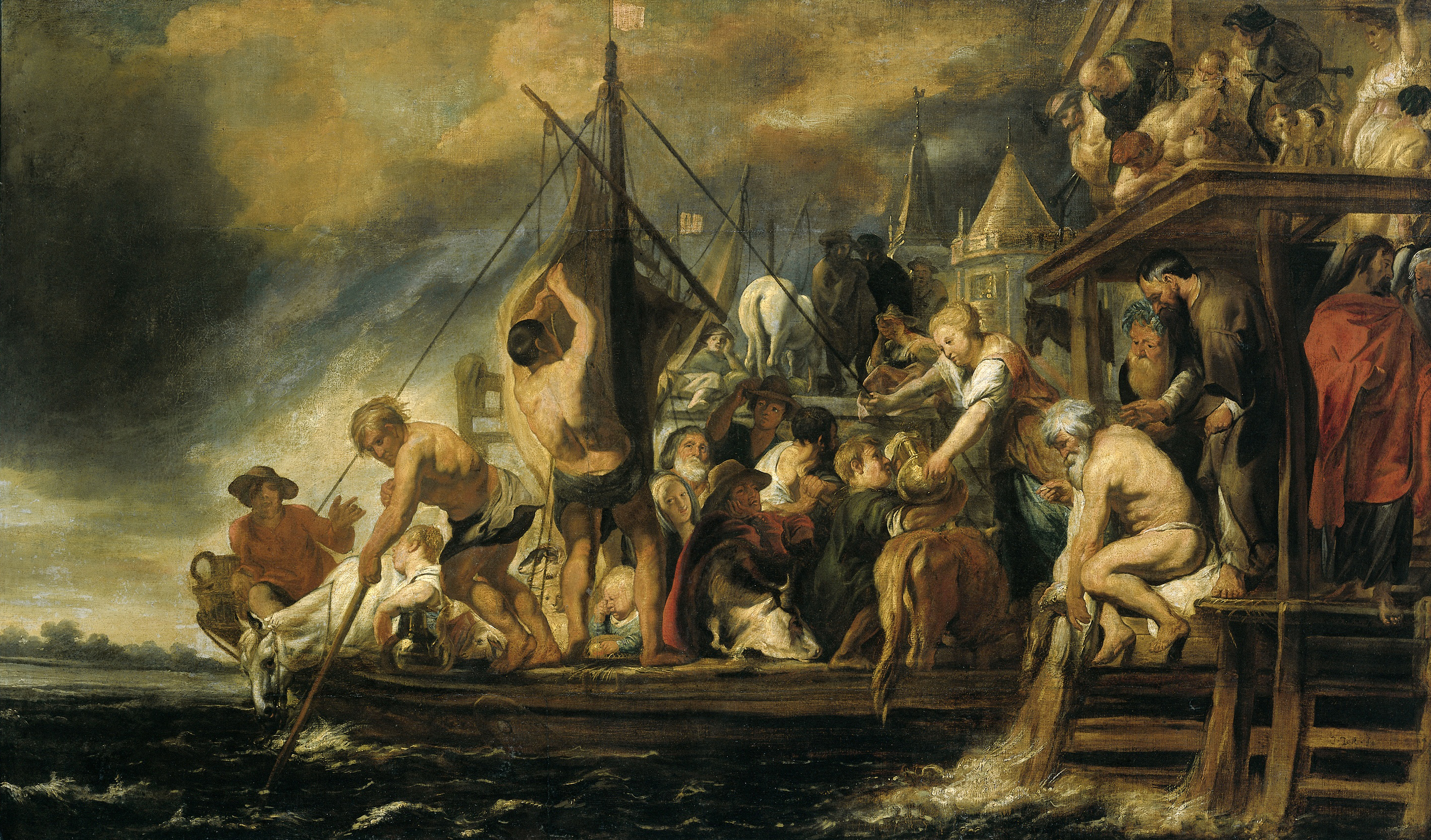
Peter Finding the Silver Coin in the Mouth of the Fish, Rijksmuseum

The work was painted by Jordaens in Antwerp between 1616 and 1634. The work was in the private collection of Louis de Geer or Gier (II) (originally from Liège) at Finspång Castle in the 17th century. It was brought to Finspång Castle by either Louis de Geer II or Louis de Geer III in 1695. It was in the early 20th century in the private collection in Stockholm/Mogård of the Swedish politician Axel Ekman. It was acquired from him in 1912 by the National Gallery of Denmark.

== Amsterdam version ==
Jordaens also painted a smaller version (119 x 197.5 cm) of the same bible story which is in the Rijksmuseum in Amsterdam. The painting, likely painted in the 1630s or early 1640s, is no preparatory sketch or a repetition of the earlier work, but rather an adaptation of the same subject matter. Saint Peter, fetching the fish, the man hoisting the sail, one of the two men pushing the boat with oars, the child crying for his apple, the woman with the straw hat are all in the same location and in nearly the same pose as in the older version. A number of figures have changed or been added. To the right, a small platform is now shown on the jetty, on and underneath which numerous people are standing. Next to it there is a view of the towers of a city. A strong glowing light and heavy shadows fall on the colourful crowd. There is a sharp contrast between the people on the boat shown in the bright light and those on the roof and on the jetty, who are in the shadows and depicted in dull grey tones.
