= Christ treading on the beasts =

Subject found in Late Antique and Early Medieval art

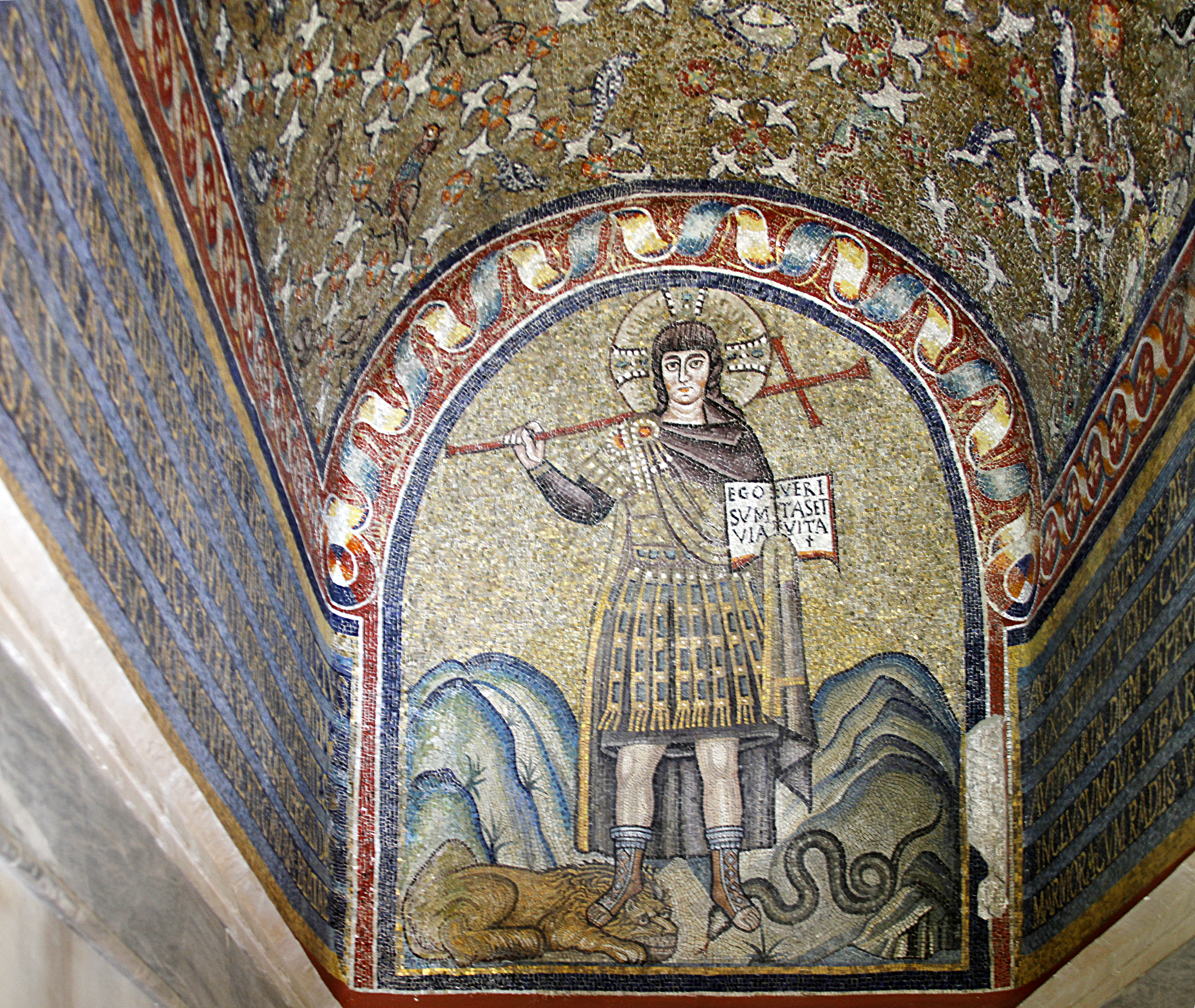
Mosaic in the Archbishop's Chapel, Ravenna, 6th century

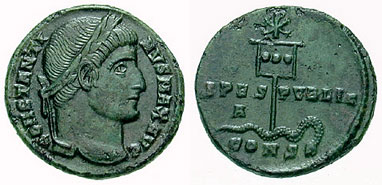
A coin of Constantine (c.337) showing a depiction of his labarum spearing a serpent.

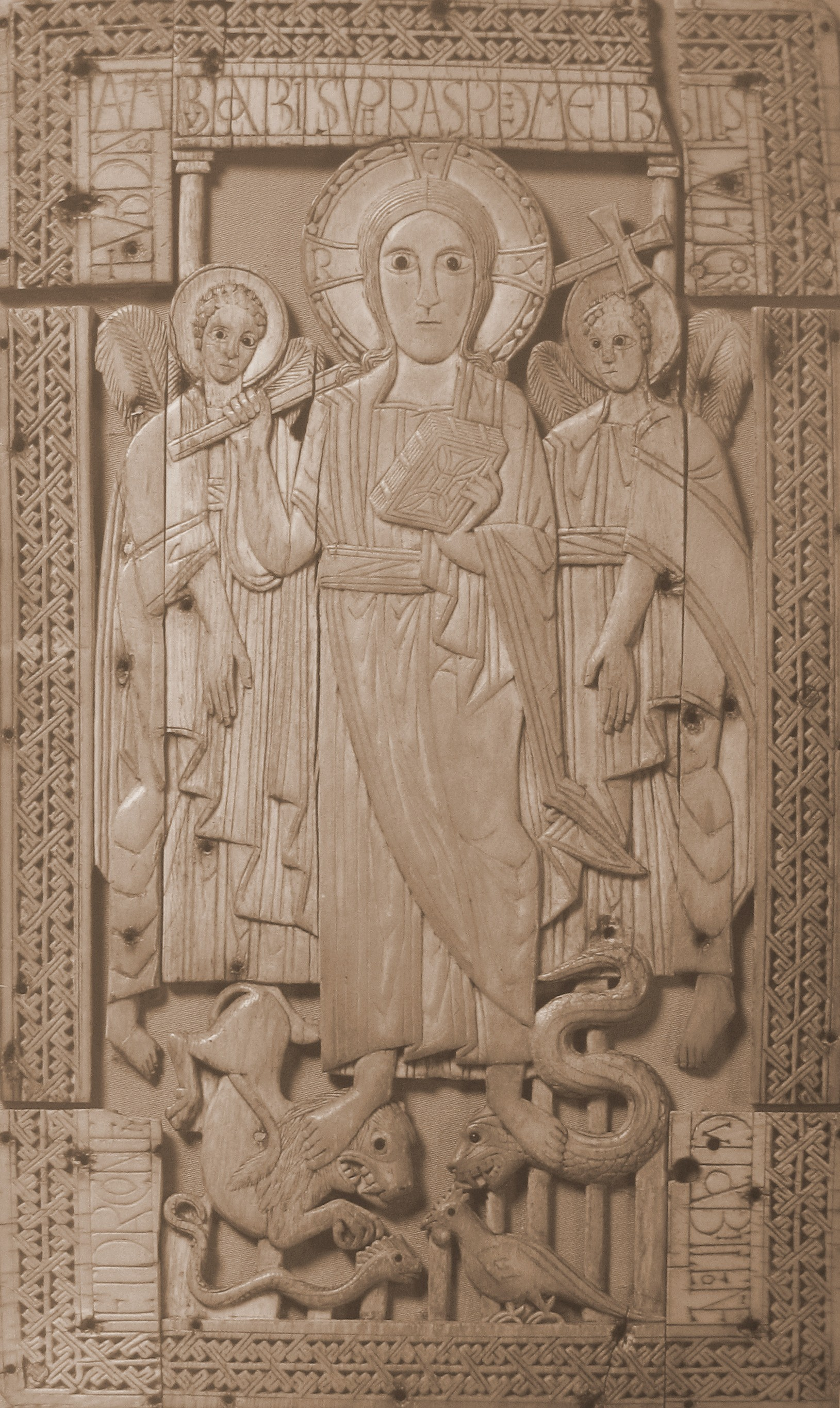
Ivory from Genoels-Elderen, with four beasts; the basilisk was sometimes depicted as a bird with a long smooth tail.

Christ treading on the beasts is a subject found in Late Antique and Early Medieval art, though it is never common. It is a variant of the "Christ in Triumph" subject of the resurrected Christ, and shows a standing Christ with his feet on animals, often holding a cross-staff which may have a spear-head at the bottom of its shaft, or a staff or spear with a cross-motif on a pennon. Some art historians argue that the subject exists in an even rarer pacific form as "Christ recognised by the beasts".

== Iconography ==
The iconography derives from Biblical texts, in particular Psalm 91 (90):13: "super aspidem et basiliscum calcabis conculcabis leonem et draconem" in the Latin Vulgate, literally "The asp and the basilisk you will trample under foot/you will tread on the lion and the dragon", translated in the King James Version as: Thou shalt tread upon the lion and adder: the young lion and the dragon shalt thou trample under feet". This was interpreted as a reference to Christ defeating and triumphing over Satan. Sometimes two beasts are shown, usually the lion and snake or dragon, and sometimes four, which are normally the lion, dragon, asp (snake) and basilisk (which was depicted with varying characteristics) of the Vulgate. All represented the devil, as explained by Cassiodorus and Bede in their commentaries on Psalm 91. The verse was part of the daily monastic service of compline, and also sung in the Roman liturgy for Good Friday, the day of Christ's Crucifixion.

The earliest appearance of the subject in a major work is a 6th-century mosaic of Christ, dressed as a general or emperor in military uniform, clean-shaven and with a cross-halo, in the Archbishop's Chapel, Ravenna. One arm holds open a book showing the text of John 14.6: "I am the way, and the truth, and the life", while the other holds the bottom of a cross resting across Christ's shoulder. Here the subject is thought to refer to the contemporary struggle of the Church against the Arian heresy, which denied the divine nature of Christ; the image asserts the orthodox doctrine. A lion and snake are shown.

The first depictions show Christ standing frontally, apparently at rest, standing on defeated beasts. From the late Carolingian period, the cross starts to end in a spear-head, which Christ may be shown driving down into a beast (often into the mouth of the serpent) in an energetic pose, using a compositional type more often (and earlier) found in images of the Archangel Michael fighting Satan. In all the depictions mentioned above and below, up to the Errondo relief, Christ is beardless. Later still the beasts more often appear beneath the feet of a seated Christ in Majesty, becoming an occasional feature of this subject. Alternatively the beasts are replaced by a solitary snake trodden on by Christ.

The more "militant" depictions are especially a feature of Anglo-Saxon art, which Meyer Schapiro attributes to "the primitive taste of the Anglo-Saxon tribes for imagery of heroic combats with wild beasts and monsters, as in Beowulf and the pagan legends."

== Notable examples ==
The motif appears in several other works from the Carolingian period onwards, which include:

- an ivory relief from Charlemagne's "Court School" on the detached back cover of the Lorsch Gospels, an illuminated manuscript Gospel book of about 810 (Vatican Museums, with four beasts).
- the central panel of the Carolingian ivory book cover of Bodleian Library, MS Douce 176, often known as the "Oxford book cover"; four beasts.
- another Carolingian ivory relief, also probably originally a book-cover, from Genoels-Elderen, now in Belgium, either a much more provincial version of Carolingian style, or Northumbrian; There are four beasts.
- the Anglo-Saxon stone Ruthwell Cross, with two matched beasts that have been described as "otter-like". Christ has no cross, and stands with his hands held together in front of him. The image here, which is much the most discussed by scholars, partly because it is badly worn and hard to read, has been denied to be of the subject at all – see below. Here the image represents the divine nature of Christ, matching the slightly smaller image on the other main side of the shaft representing his human nature with Mary Magdalene drying his feet.
- the Anglo-Saxon Bewcastle Cross, a very similar depiction to the Ruthwell Cross.
- the late Carolingian illustration for Psalm 90 in the Utrecht Psalter shows Christ using the shaft of his cross, not yet a spear, as a weapon against the serpent.
- the Stuttgart Psalter, of similar date, below a Temptation, Christ's cross appears to end in a spear-point, which is plunged into the serpent.
- the ivory head of an early 11th-century tau cross in the British Museum.
- the Crowland Psalter (Bodleian, MS Douce 296), Anglo-Saxon from the mid-11th century, with spear and two beasts, in what was to be a common pattern for psalters.
- An end of the shrine of Saint Hadelin, c. 1075, Church of St Martin, Visé; beardless Christ has a foot on each of the necks of two beasts.
- the "Errondo Tympanum" relief, by the Master of Cabestany (1150–1175), now in the Cloisters, New York, showing three figures of Christ (now bearded), each standing on a beast, in a combined scene of the Temptations.
- tympanum relief of c. 1216 at the church in Strzelno, Poland; two beasts beneath a seated Christ.
- Gothic sculpture on the portal of Amiens Cathedral of standing blessing Christ and two beasts.
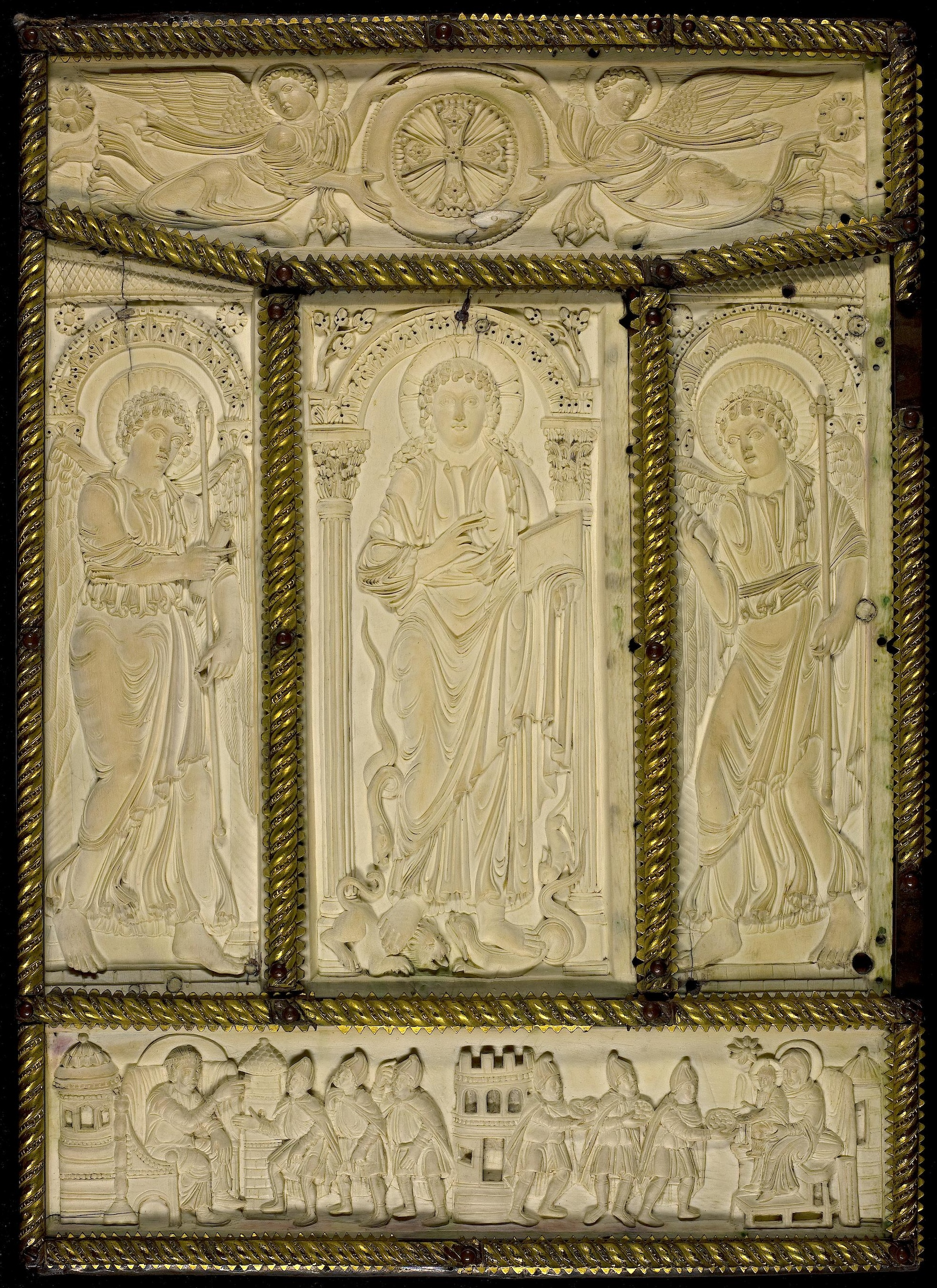
Rear ivory cover of the Lorsch Gospels, c. 810

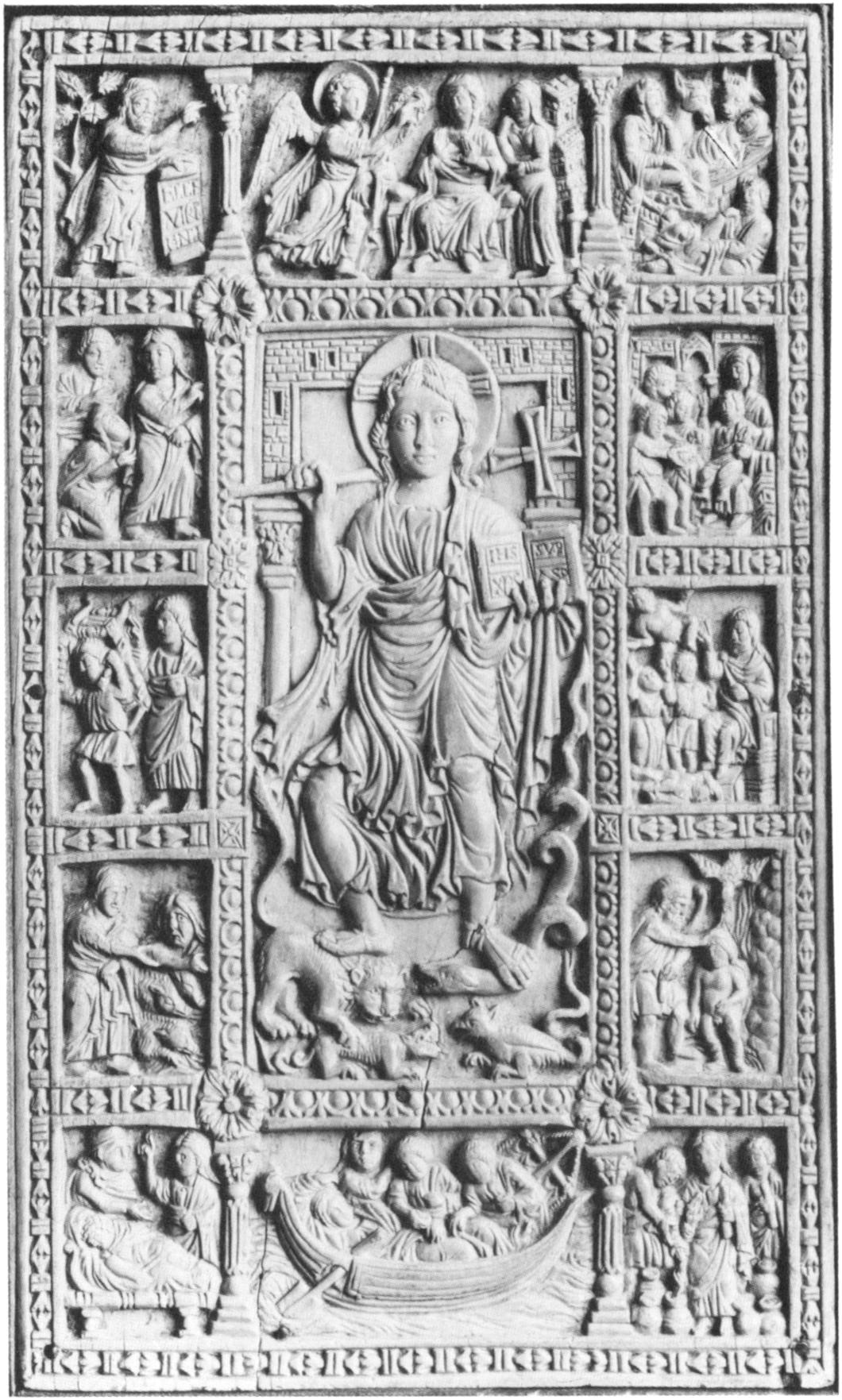
The "Oxford book cover" of Bodleian MS Douce 176

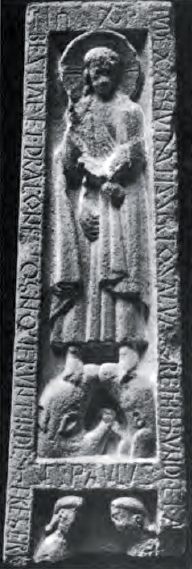
The Ruthwell Cross

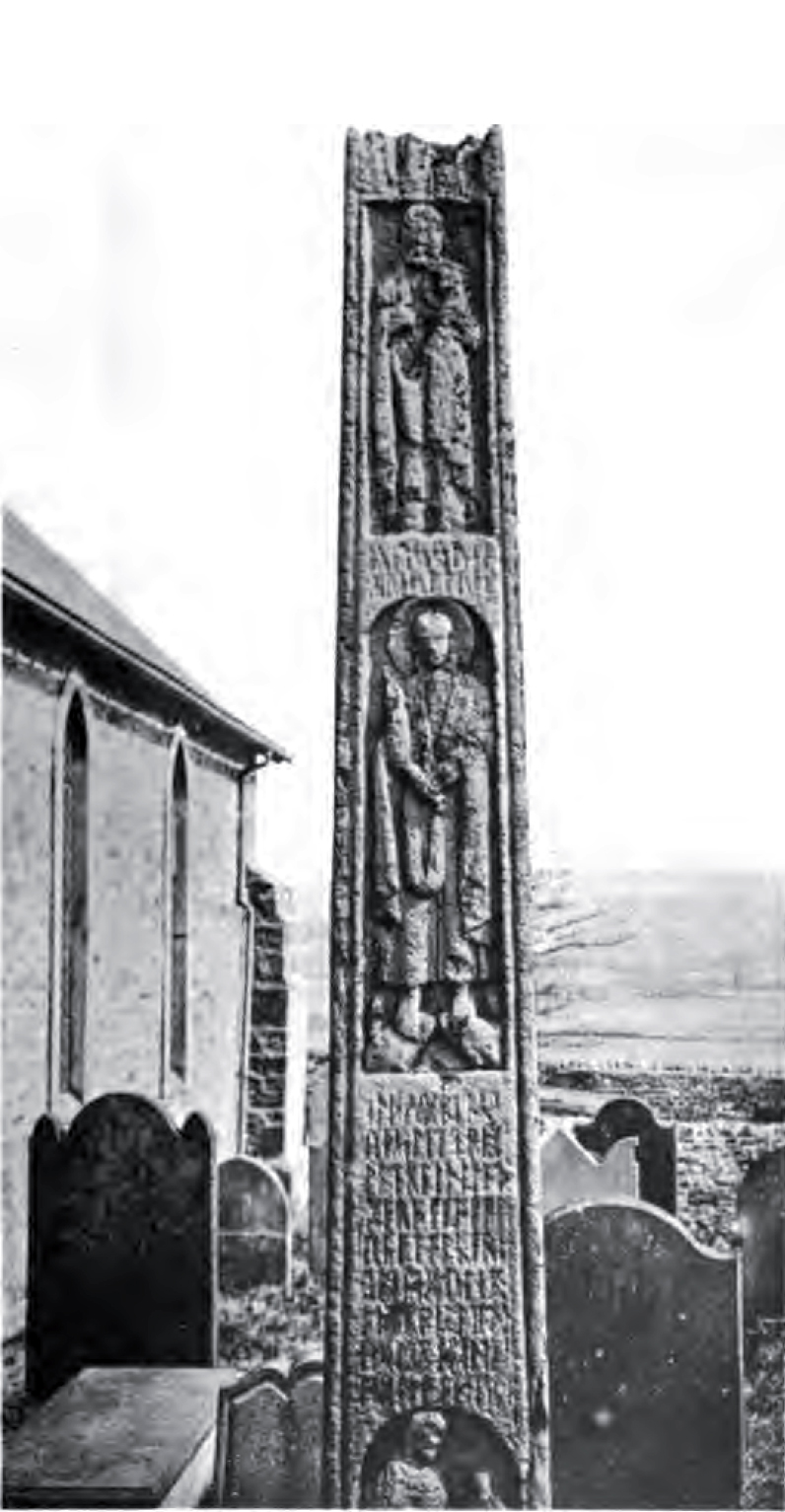
Bewcastle Cross, West Face, John the Baptist, Christ treading on the beasts, and runes

== Christ recognised by the animals? ==
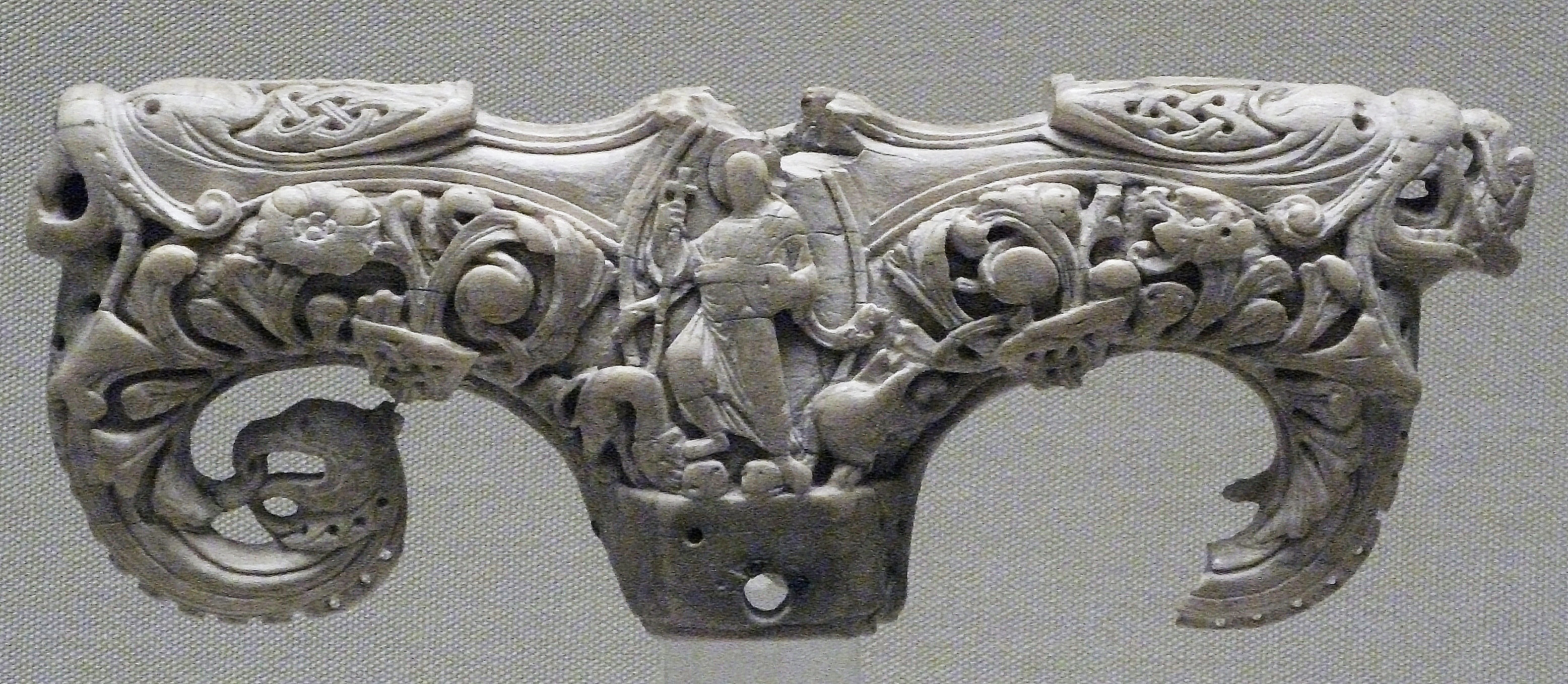
Anglo-Saxon head of tau cross, 11th century

An alternative view of the iconography of the Ruthwell and Bewcastle Crosses sees the panels with Christ as showing a different depiction, even rarer than Christ treading on the beasts, which has been called "Christ as Judge recognised by the beasts in the desert". This hitherto unrecognised subject was first proposed by Fritz Saxl, followed by Meyer Schapiro. The crucial difference is that in this interpretation the animals do not represent the devil, but actual wildlife encountered by Jesus, specifically in his forty days in the "wilderness" or desert in between his Baptism and Temptation. Schapiro assembled a good deal of textual material showing tropes of wild beasts submitting to Christ and other Christian figures, especially in the context of the early monasticism of the desert, where the attitude of the challenging local fauna was a live issue. The legend of Saint Jerome and the lion is an enduring example, and later Saint Francis of Assisi renewed the theme.

This interpretation has met with considerable acceptance, though the matter cannot be regarded as settled. A small number of other examples of the new subject have been advanced, most from before about 1200, though the clearest is in a 14th-century Catalan full-page miniature (BnF, Ms. Lat. 8846) which shows a Temptation of Christ followed by a scene which seems unmistakably to show lions, bears and deer sitting peacefully in pairs as they are blessed by Christ. The inscription round the image on the Ruthwell Cross, for which no direct source is known, reads: "IHS XPS iudex aequitatis; bestiae et dracones cognoverunt in deserto salvatorem mundi" – "Jesus Christ: the judge of righteousness: the beasts and dragons recognised in the desert the saviour of the world". The new interpretation would only apply to the two Anglo-Saxon crosses among the examples mentioned here; works such as the Ravenna mosaic and the Carolingian book-covers are not claimed to show it. Other Anglo-Saxon pieces might represent it, for example, according to Leslie Webster a brooch in Ludlow Museum from the 2nd quarter of the 7th century with two beast heads at the foot of a cross "must also represent Creation's adoration of the risen Christ" Schapiro saw the "peaceful" image as the original version, its composition later turned into the "militant" version, probably after the Constantinian conversion, but surviving in a small trickle of examples, especially those produced in contexts of monastic asceticism, showing "Christ as the ideal monk".

== Variants and related depictions ==
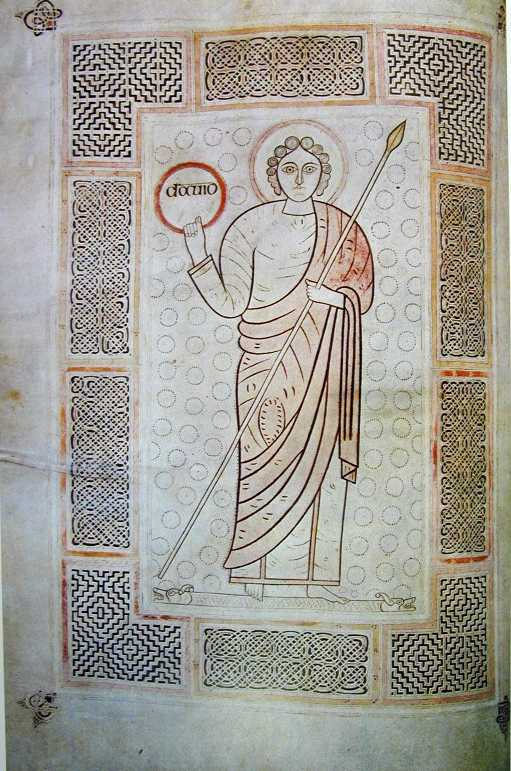
Illustration of David as Victor from the Durham Cassiodorus.

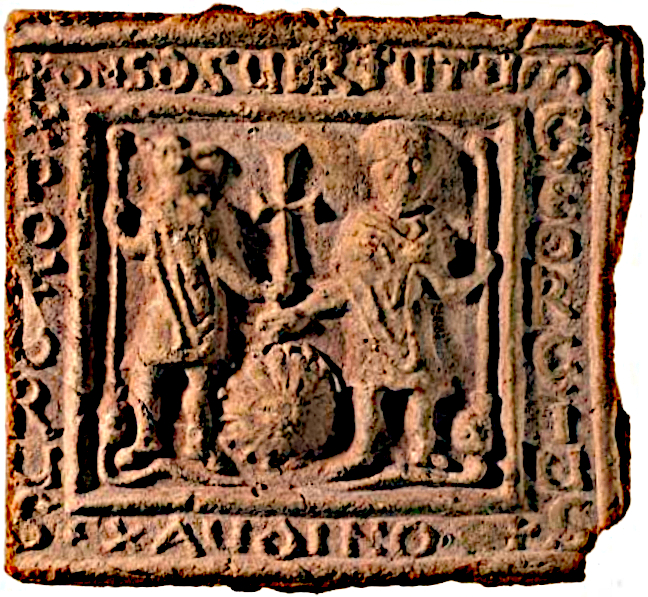
Vinica icon of Saints Christopher and George

By the 8th century, the motif of "treading" on devilish beasts was transferred to saints. One of the terracotta icons found near Vinica, North Macedonia shows a cynocephalous Saint Christopher and the military saint George as treading on two snakes with human heads, both saints aiming lances at the heads of the snakes. This is the earliest known form of the dragon-slaying motif which by the 10th or 11th century was strongly associated with the military saints Theodore and George. A well-known figure of David in the Durham Cassiodorus (8th century) is shown holding a spear and standing on a snake with a head at each end, a composite figure of the beasts. The book which the miniature illustrates is Cassiodorus's Commentary on the Psalms, which explains that Psalm 90:13 refers to Christ, and elsewhere that David, who is portrayed in the only two surviving miniatures, is a type of Christ. In later Anglo-Saxon manuscripts, such as the Tiberius C. VI Psalter (British Library), the figure standing on a similar beast is Christ.

A variant depiction may also relate to a different text, Psalm 74:13:- "Thou didst divide the sea by thy strength: thou brakest the heads of the dragons in the waters" (KJV). This was related by commentators to baptism, and on the wooden doors of Sankt Maria im Kapitol in Cologne (1049), may be referred to in the scene of the Baptism of Christ, where Christ stands on some sort of sea-monster. Another possibility, following the commentary of Eusebius, is that the Baptism provoked the devilish beasts to attack Christ, an episode often considered to relate to the Temptation of Christ, which immediately follows the Baptism in the Synoptic Gospels.

In a Romanesque tympanum of the Adoration of the Magi, at Neuilly-en-Donjon of c. 1130, Christ does not appear, but the Three Magi pick their way to the Virgin and Child along the back of a bull-like dragon, while the Virgin's throne sits on a lion; both animals are lying in profile, facing out of the scenes, and one of Mary's feet rests on the hind-quarters of each beast. Following the imagery of chapter 12 of the Book of Revelation, Bernard of Clairvaux had called Mary the "conqueror of dragons", and she was long to be shown crushing a snake underfoot, also a reference to her title as the "New Eve"
