= Denn er hat seinen Engeln befohlen =

1844 motet by Felix Mendelssohn

- Motet by Felix Mendelssohn
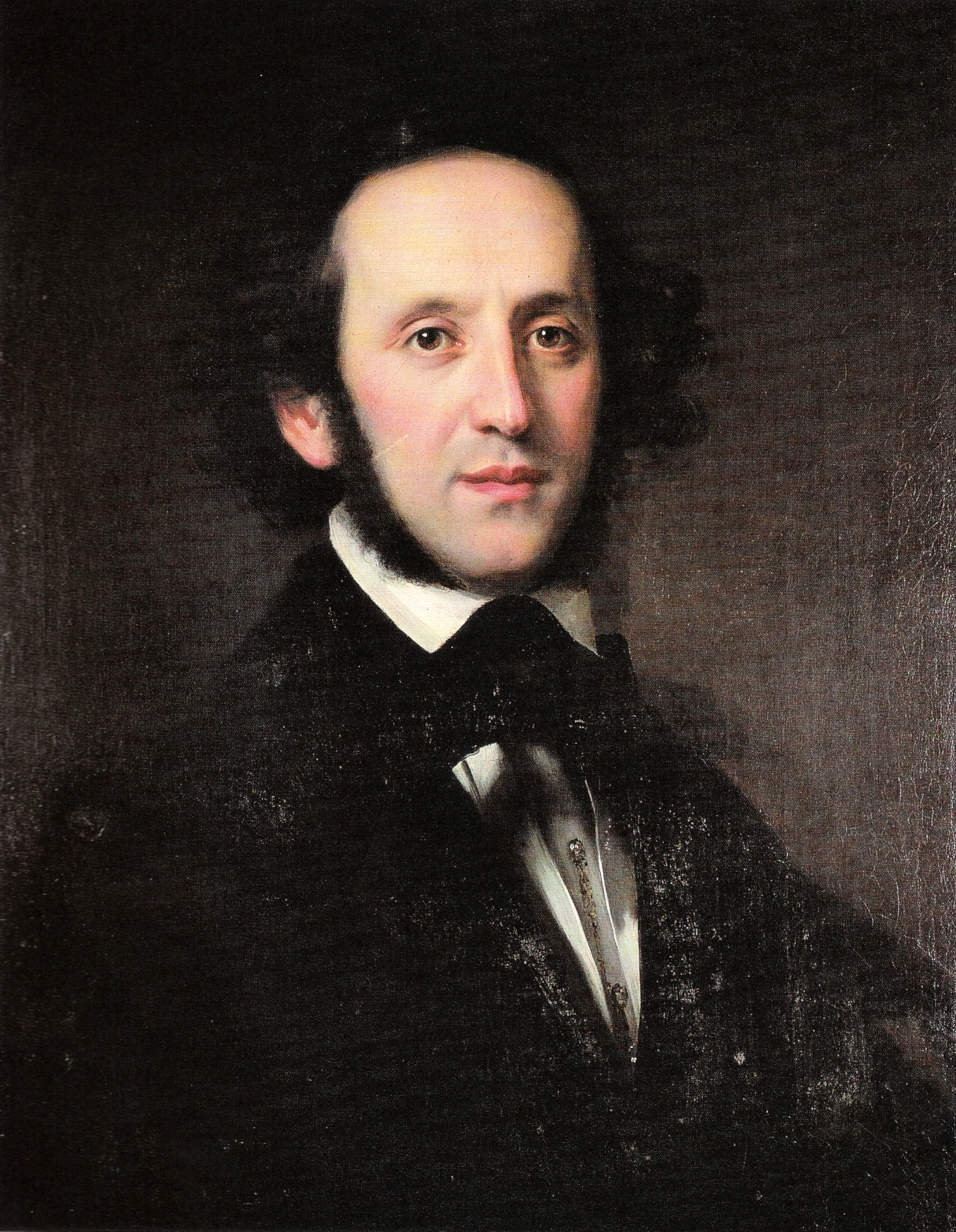
- The composer in 1846, portrait by Eduard Magnus
- English: For He shall give His angels charge
- Key: G major
- Catalogue: MWV B 53
- Text: Psalm 91:11–12
- Language: German
- Composed: 1844
- Published: 1844
- Scoring: SATB eight-part choir

Denn er hat seinen Engeln befohlen (For He shall give His angels charge), MWV B 53, is the incipit of a motet for an eight-part choir a cappella by Felix Mendelssohn. He wrote it in 1844 for the Berlin Cathedral, setting verses 11 and 12 from Psalm 91. Later, Mendelssohn made the motet with accompaniment part of his oratorio Elijah. It was published in 1844, and by Breitkopf & Härtel in 1875 in the complete edition of the composer's works.

== History ==
Mendelssohn composed the motet in 1844 for the choir of the Berlin Cathedral which he conducted from 1843. He dedicated it to Friedrich Wilhelm IV of Prussia, who had survived an assassination attempt shortly before. It was published by Bösenberg in Leipzig in 1844.

Later, Mendelssohn made the motet with orchestral accompaniment part of his oratorio Elijah, as movement 7. It appeared in 1875 in the complete edition of the composer's works by Breitkopf & Härtel. It was published in a critical edition by Bärenreiter and by Carus-Verlag. Mendelssohn's autograph is held by the Staatsbibliothek zu Berlin – Preussischer Kulturbesitz.

== Text and music ==
The music is in one movement in G major and common time, marked Allegretto non troppo. Mendelssohn wrote it in three sections, ABA', with a recapitulation of text and music of the first verse after the second.

The text are verses 11 and 12 from Psalm 91 in the translation by Martin Luther. The English translation is from the King James Version of the Bible.

German

Denn er hat seinen Engeln befohlen über dir,
dass sie dich behüten auf allen deinen Wegen,
dass sie dich auf den Händen tragen
und du deinen Fuß nicht an einem Stein stoßest.

English

For he shall give his angels charge over thee,
to keep thee in all thy ways.
They shall bear thee up in their hands,
lest thou dash thy foot against a stone.

The German "behüten" is related to "hüten", the job of a shepherd, to guard and protect, captured in the English Guardian angel.

The first line is sung only by the four upper voices in homophony, beginning softly (piano) in steady walking rhythm, with an accent, in high pitch and by double length, on "Engeln" (angels). It is similarly answered by the lower voices. The antiphonal treatment continues for the second line, with a climax in eight-part homophony. A repeat of the first line begins the second verse (line 3, "bear thee up in their hands), which appears as slightly more lively motif in upward motion, first divided again for the two choirs then reaching a climax for all voices on "dich" (you), marked forte for the first time. It leads to the last line, set for all voices with chromatism in dense texture. Text and themes from the beginning return in the upper voices, while the lower voices still end line 4 in long notes. In the recapitulation, the theme from the beginning is treated to some intensifying polyphony. The piece ends, gradually softening, in calmness.

== Recording ==
The popular motet was recorded often. Its title was chosen as the title of a collection of sacred music by Mendelssohn, recorded in 1997 by the Kammerchor Stuttgart, conducted by Frieder Bernius. The motet was recorded in 2009 by the Estonian Philharmonic Chamber Choir, conducted by Daniel Reuss, among psalm settings by Mendelssohn and Cyrillus Kreek. The Chamber Choir of Europe recorded it to conclude a collection of Mendelssohn's choral works, conducted by Nicol Matt, in 2006. It concludes volume V of sacred a cappella works. It was performed by the Regensburger Domspatzen in a concert for Pope Benedict XVI in the Sistine Chapel in 2005, which is available on CD.
