= Codex Aureus of Lorsch =

Latin illuminated Gospel Book

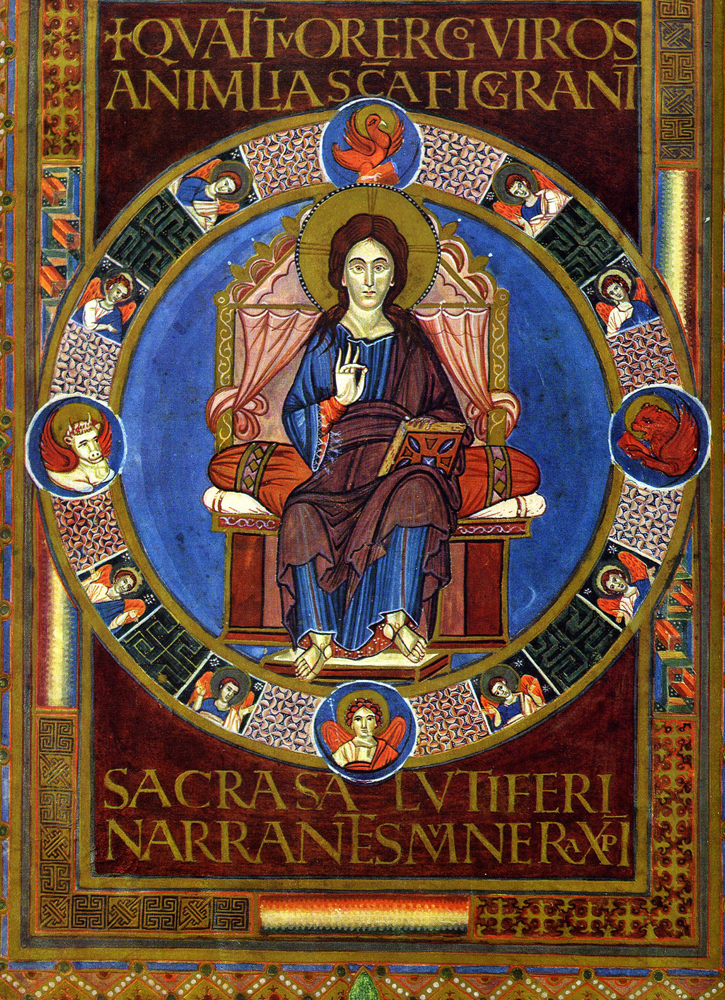
Folio 72 verso of the Codex Aureus of Lorsch contains an illumination of Christ in Majesty

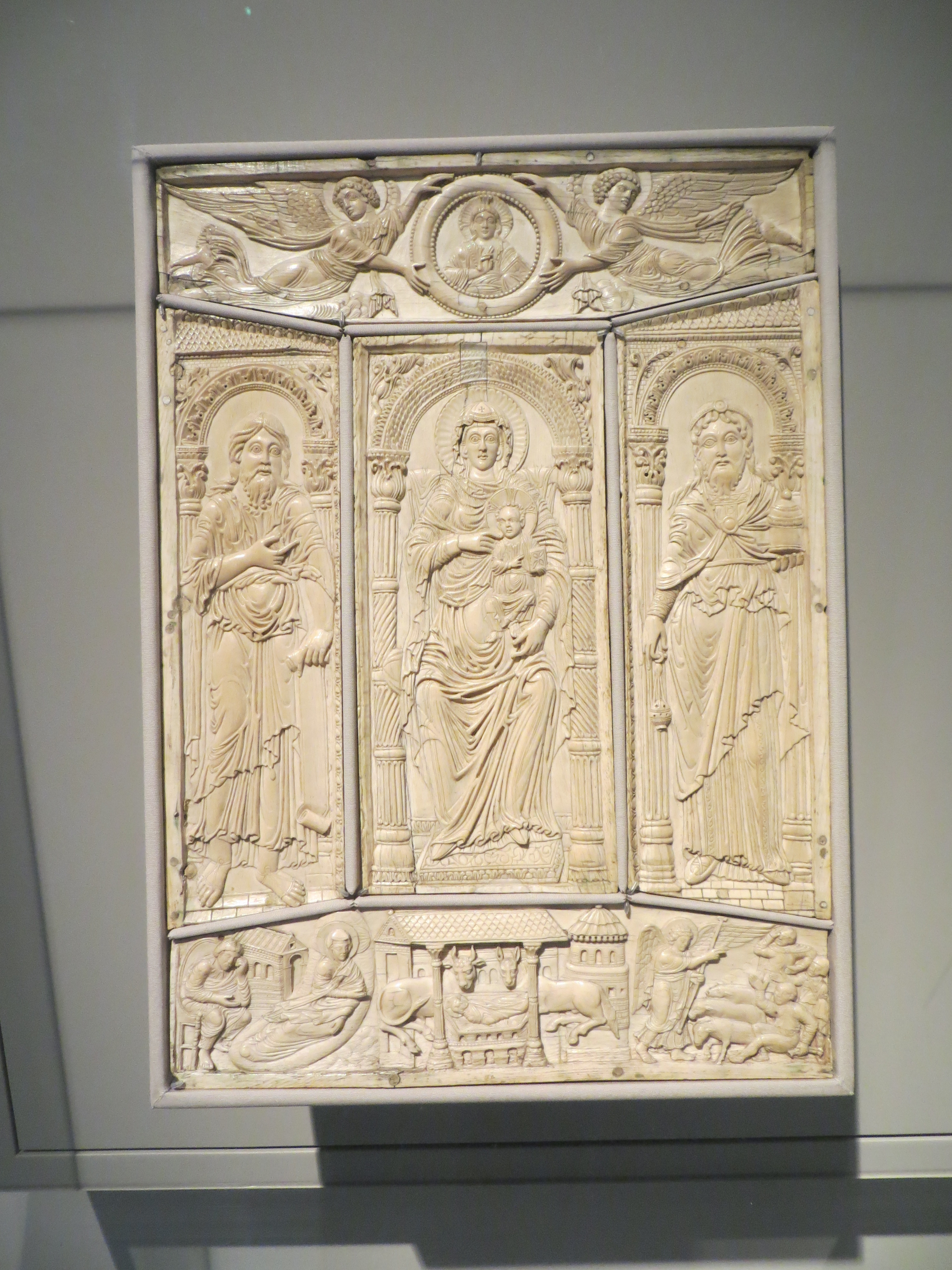
Virgin and Child with John the Baptist and Zachary's. Book cover of the Lorsch Gospels (back cover). Nativity and annunciation to the shepherds below. Ivory, 14 7/8 x 10 3.4in. (37.8 x 27.3 cm), c. 810. Victoria and Albert Museum, London.

The Codex Aureus of Lorsch or Lorsch Gospels (Biblioteca Apostolica Vaticana, Pal. lat. 50, and Alba Iulia, Biblioteca Documenta Batthyaneum, s.n.) is an illuminated Gospel Book written in Latin between 778 and 820, roughly coinciding with the period of Charlemagne's rule over the Frankish Empire. Both the manuscript and the carved ivory panels from the cover are rare and important survivals from the art of this period.

The current location of the various original parts is:

- Batthyaneum Library, Alba Iulia, Romania: Gospels of Matthew and Mark, and canon tables and preliminary matter
- Vatican Library: Gospels of Luke and John, and the ivory panels from the rear cover
- Victoria and Albert Museum, London: the ivory panels from the front cover (Inv.-Nr. 138–1866)

== History ==
It was first recorded in Lorsch Abbey (Germany), for which it was presumably written, and where it was mentioned as Evangelium scriptum cum auro pictum habens tabulas eburneas in the catalogue of the Abbey's library, compiled in 830 under Abbot Adelung. Considering gold letters in the manuscript and its location at Lorsch, it was named the Codex Aureus Laurensius. In the tenth and eleventh centuries, the library of Lorsch was one of the best libraries of the world.

In the 16th century the manuscript was taken to Heidelberg (Otto Heinrich removed the contents of the library to Heidelberg, creating the famous Bibliotheca Palatina, just prior to Lorsch's dissolution in 1563), from whence it was stolen in 1622 during the Thirty Years' War; in order to be easy to sell, the codex was broken in two and the covers torn off. The richly illustrated first half reached the Migazzi Library and after that was sold to Bishop Ignác Batthyány (1741 – 1798). This section is now in Alba Iulia, Romania, and belongs to the Batthyaneum Library founded by the bishop. The second half is in the Vatican Library. The front cover, with famous ivory reliefs in a classicising style of Christ treading on the beasts and archangels, is in the Vatican Museums, and the back cover, with the Virgin and Child with saints, angels and a Nativity of Christ below, is in the Victoria and Albert Museum in London.

The back cover of the Lorsch Gospels is divided into five panels, with a representation of the Virgin and Child seated on a throne in the center and John the Baptist and Zacharius on the sides. John the Baptist is on the left holding a scroll, while on the right Zacharius is holding incense. In the top panel there is a circular medallion framing a bust of Christ held up by two angels. In the bottom panel is a depiction of the Nativity, with Joseph, Mary, and the Christ Child in a manger. This is the scene of the birth of Christ in Bethlehem. Judging from the placement of the figures within the architectural arches, it looks as if they are taking up all of the space. The figure's shoulders are rounded as well as their stomachs and thighs, and the bottom halves of their bodies are covered by their linear drapery.

A facsimile of the codex was presented as a gift to Queen Elizabeth II by Pope Benedict XVI on 16 September 2010, who in turn received a series of Hans Holbein prints from the royal collection. A full digital version of the manuscript is available online from a number of sources. In May 2023, the manuscript was inscribed on the UNESCO Memory of the World Register.

== Gallery ==
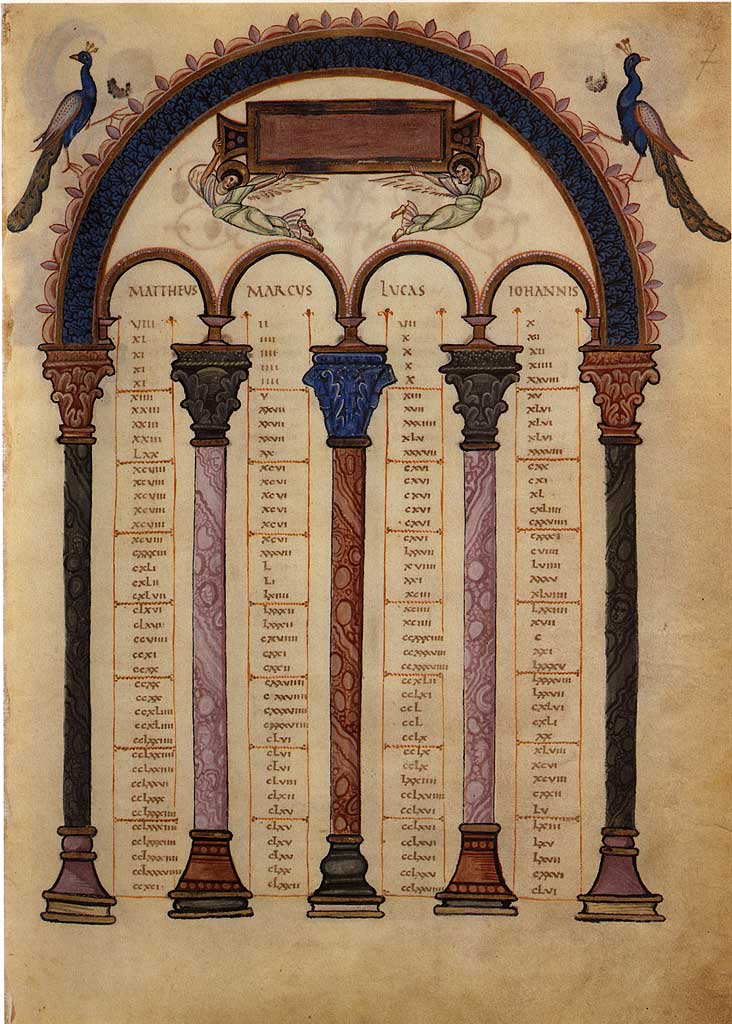

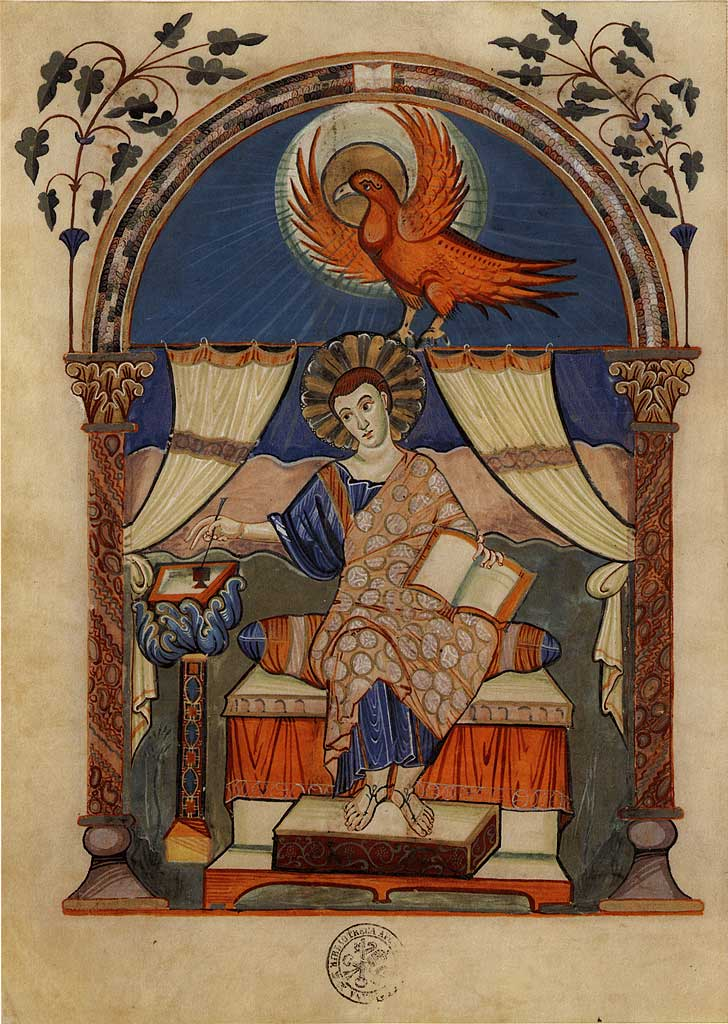

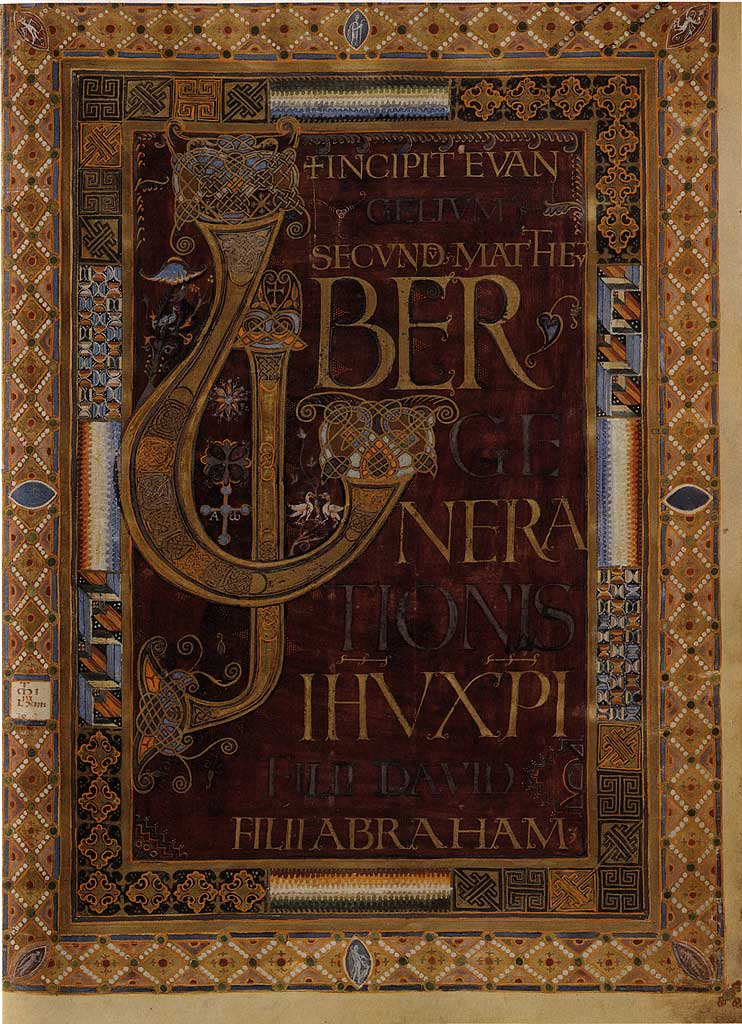

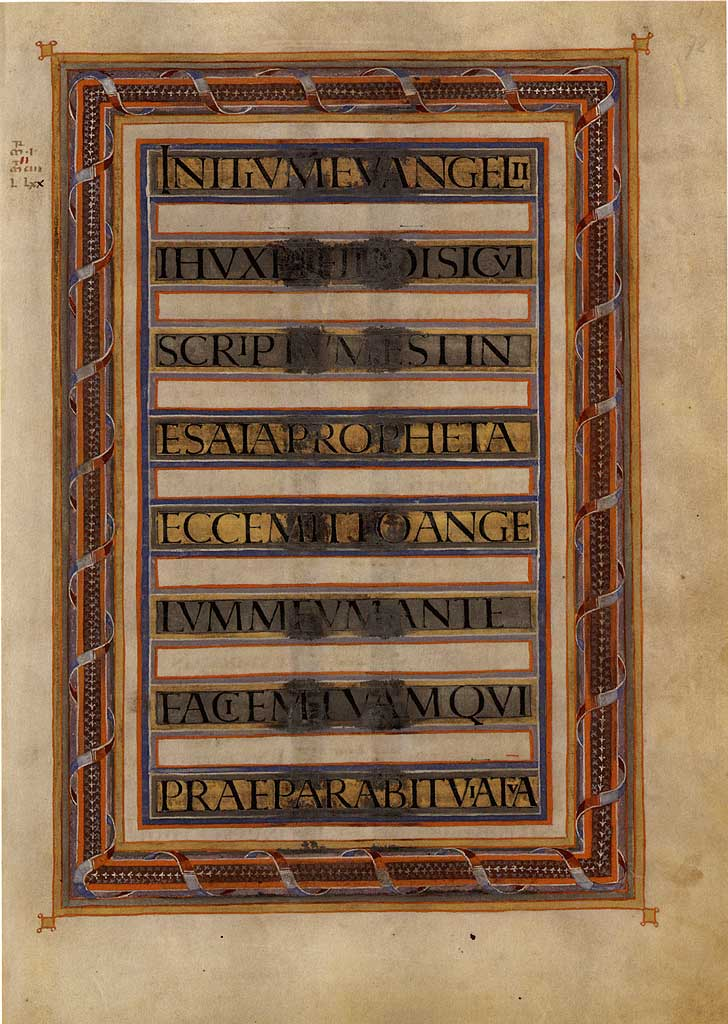

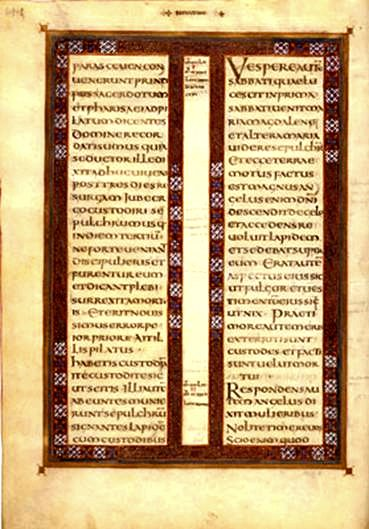

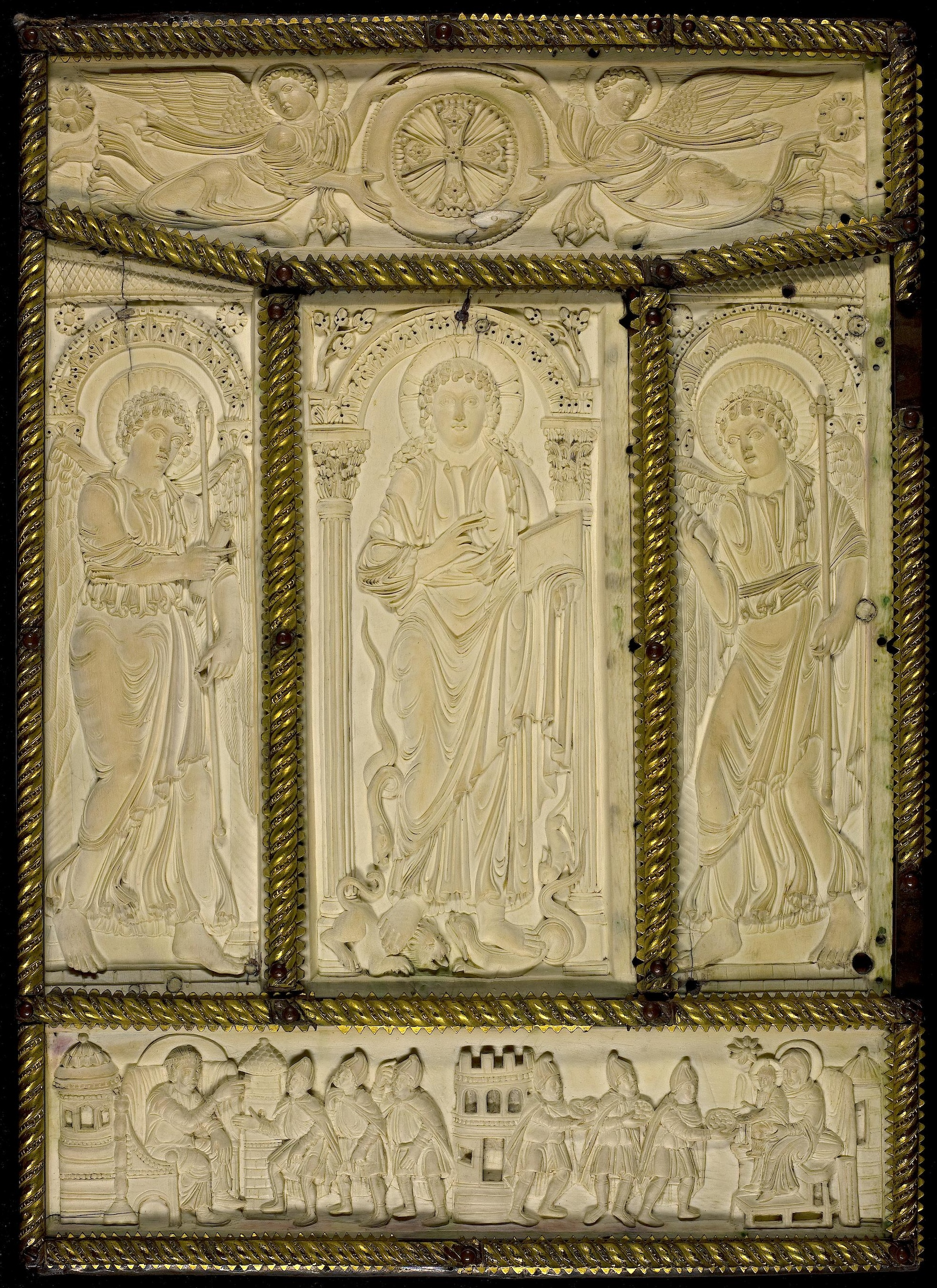
Ivory back cover
