= Archbishop's Chapel =

UNESCO World Heritage Site
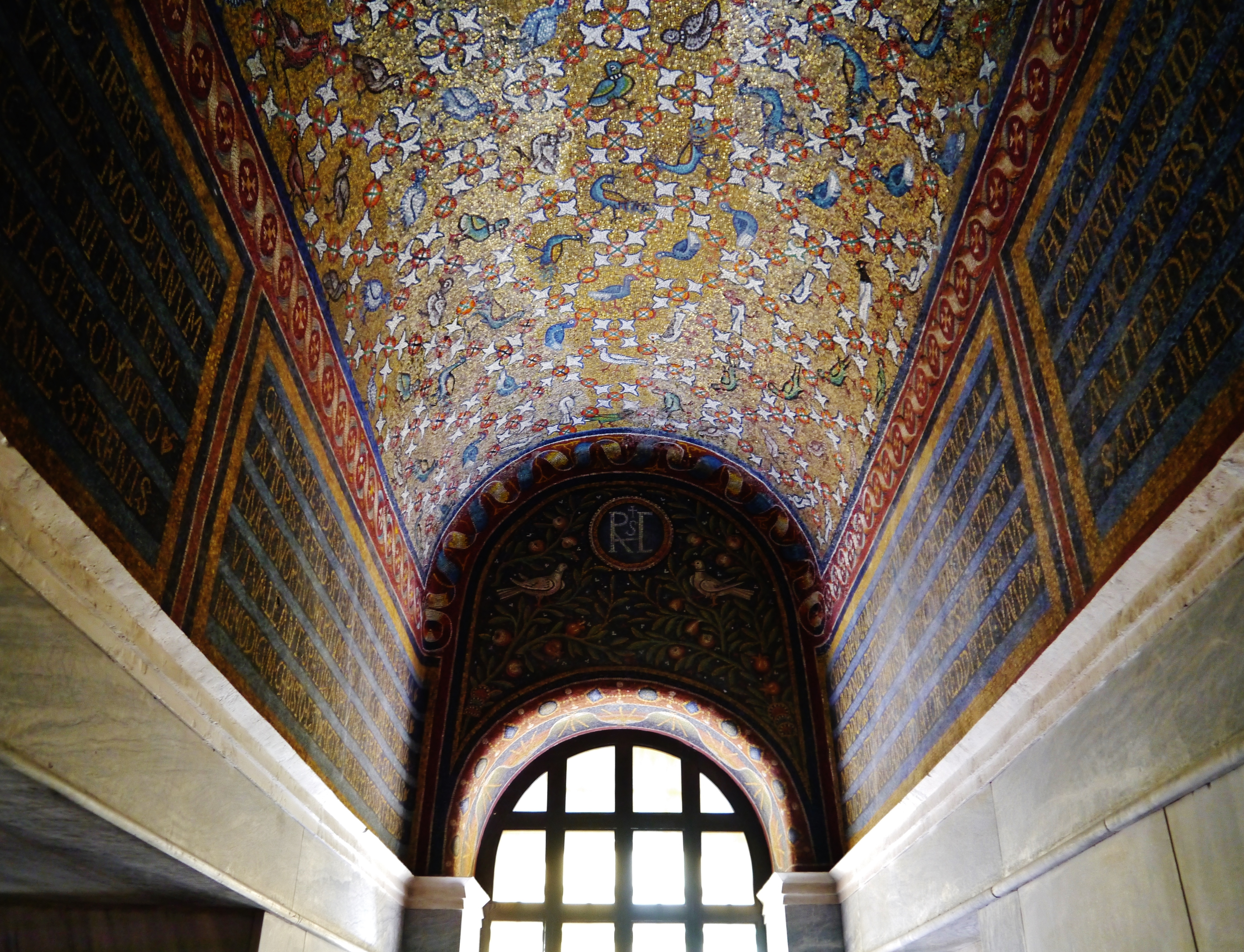
- A 6th-century mosaic in the Archiepiscopal Chapel

- Location within Italy
- Official name: Archiepiscopal Chapel
- Location: Ravenna, Italy
- Part of: Early Christian Monuments of Ravenna
- Criteria: Cultural: (i), (ii), (iii), (iv)
- Reference: 788-004
- Inscription: 1996 (20th Session)
- Area: 0.002 ha (220 sq ft)
- Buffer zone: 3.02 ha (325,000 sq ft)
- Coordinates: 44°24′55.8″N 12°11′51.9″E

The Archbishop's Chapel or Archiepiscopal Chapel (Italian: Cappella Arcivescovile) is a chapel on the first floor of the bishops' palace in Ravenna, Italy, the smallest of the famous mosaic sites of the city. It is a private oratory of Trinitarian bishops dating from the turn of the 6th century. Although commonly attributed to St. Peter Chrysologus, Archbishop of Ravenna from 433–450, the chapel was actually built by Peter II shortly after he became archbishop in 495. The mosaics date from the original construction, or soon after.

== Description ==
The tiny cruciform chapel is currently dedicated to Saint Andrew, although the original dedication was to the Saviour, as evidenced by a lunette over the vestibule door representing a beardless Christ treading on the beasts, dressed as a general or victorious Emperor. The lower parts of the walls are lined with marble slabs, while the rest of the interior used to be covered with rich, tapestry-like mosaics, as the vault still is. Some parts of these survive, while others were substituted with tempera paintings by Luca Longhi in the 16th century.

== Significance ==
According to the ICOMOS evaluation of this World Heritage Site, "the significance of this property is the fact that it is the only Early Christian private oratory that has survived to the present day. Its iconography is also important by virtue of its strongly anti-Arian symbolism".

== Gallery ==
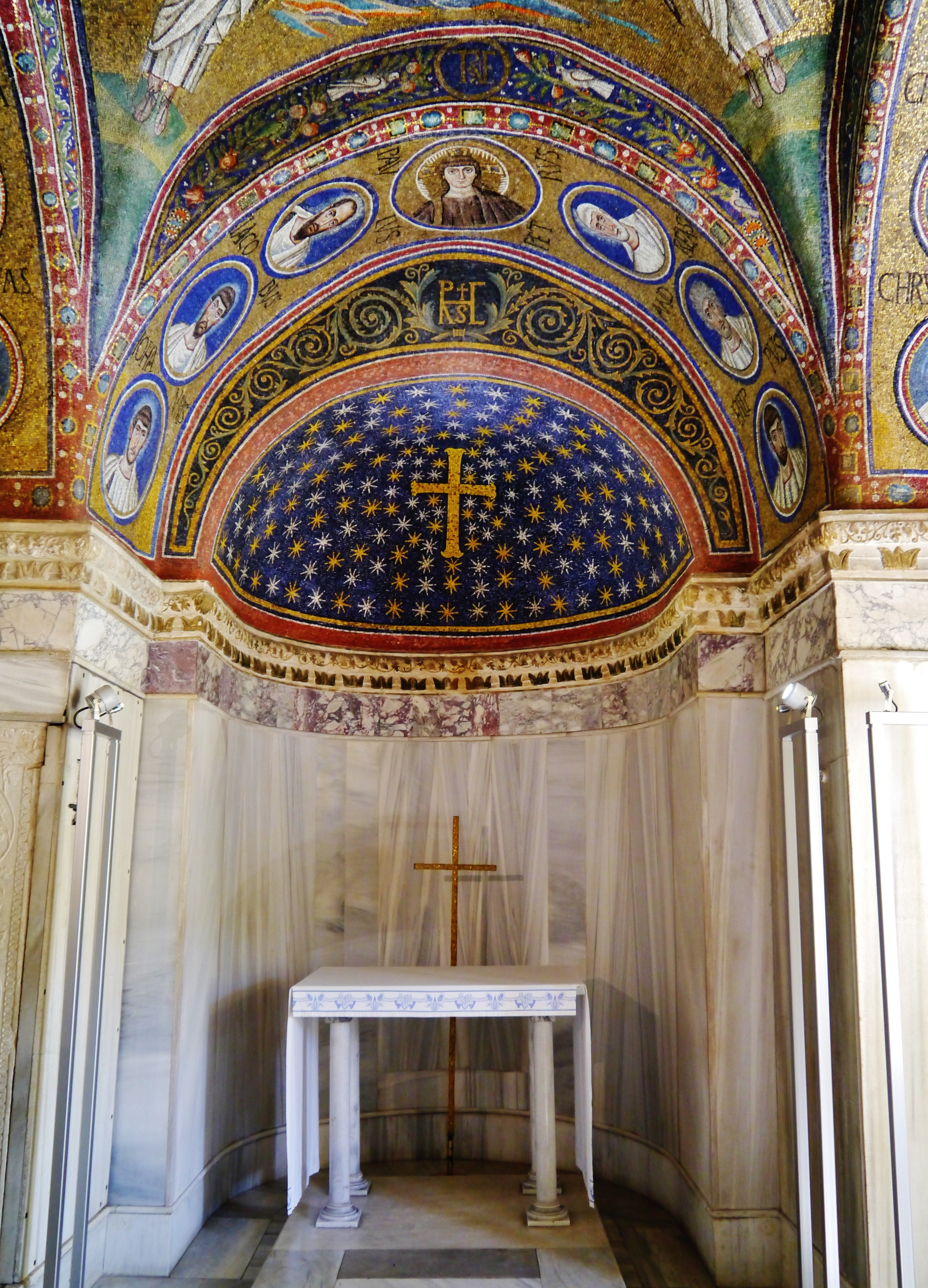

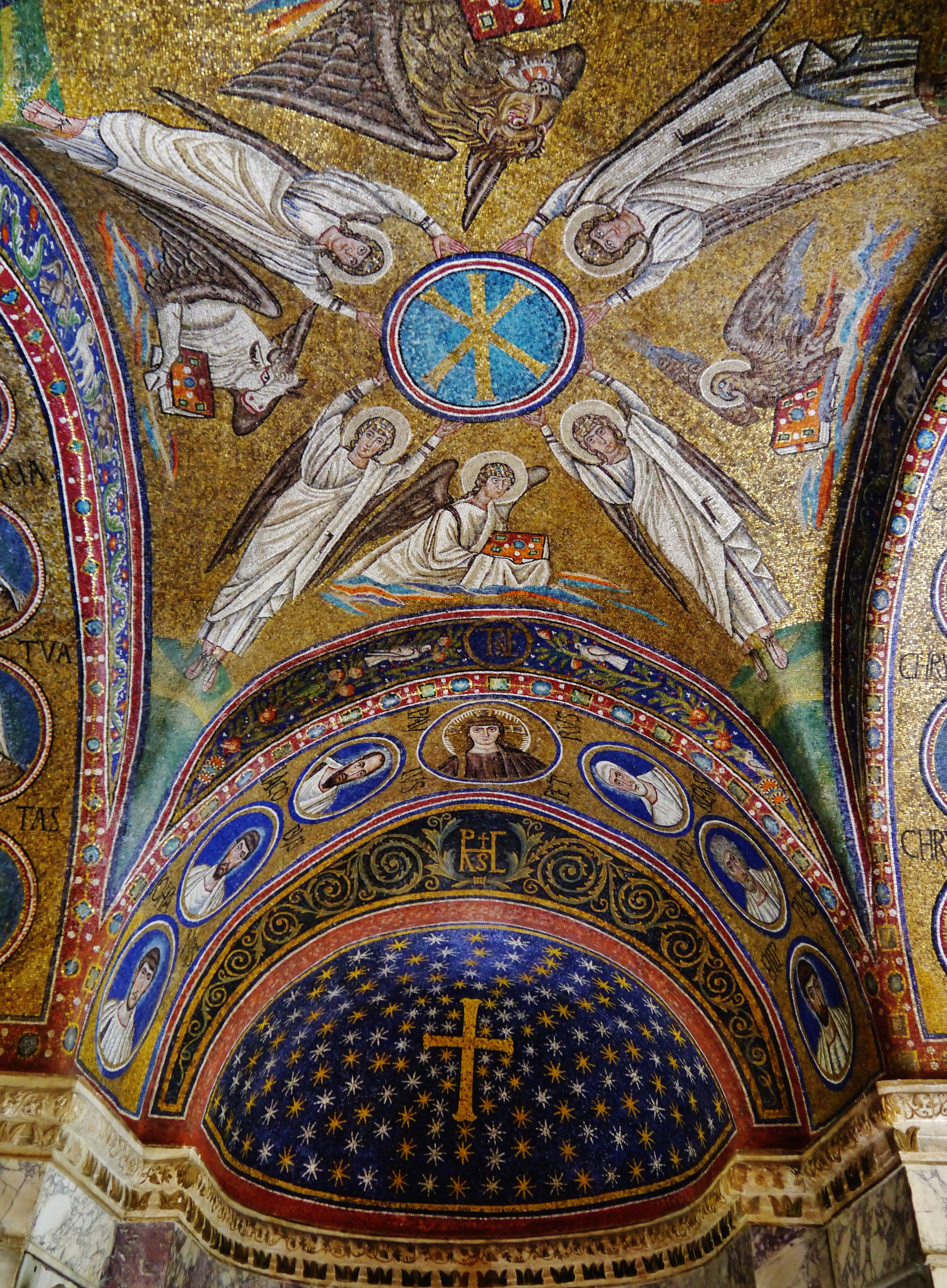

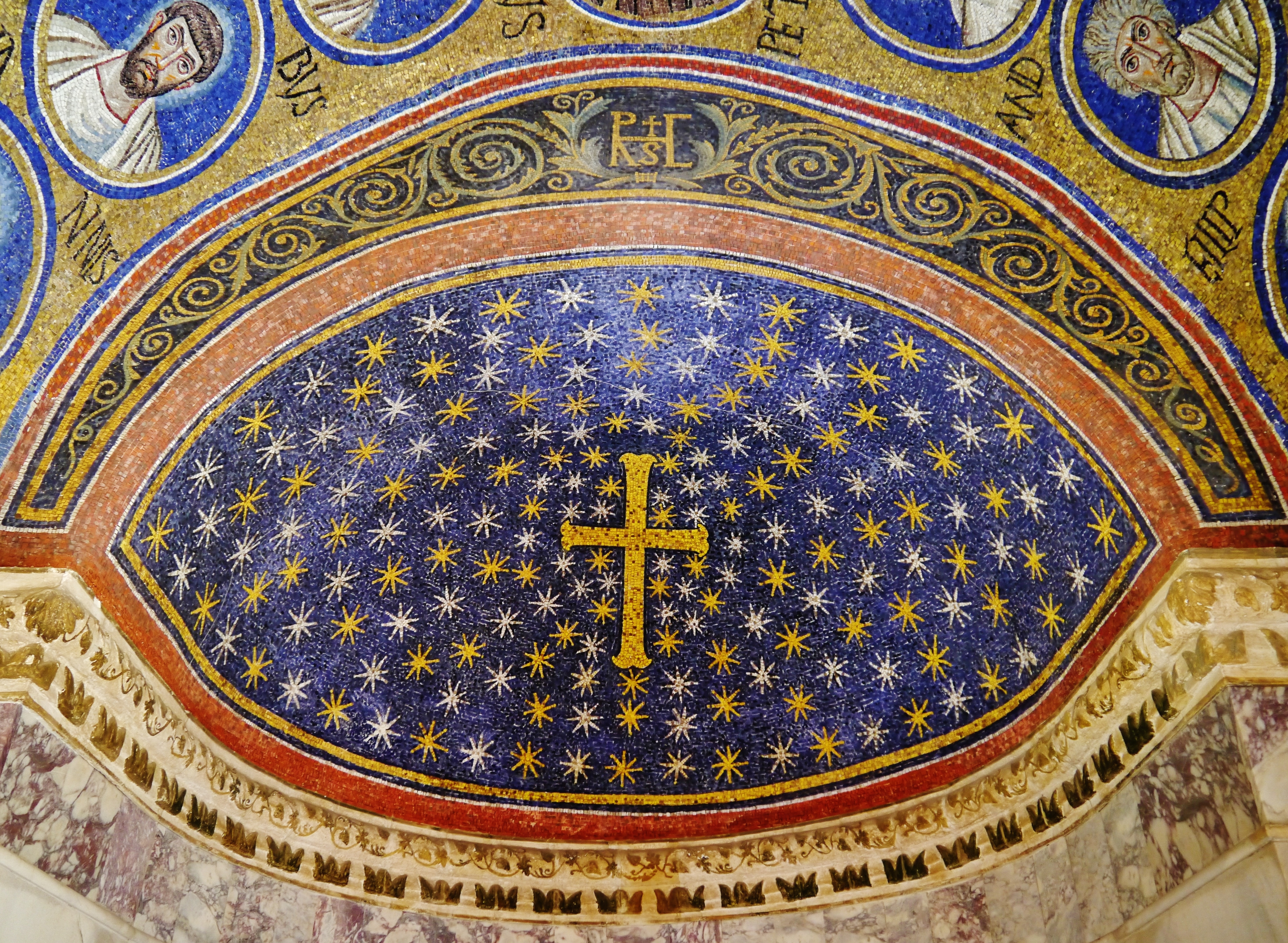

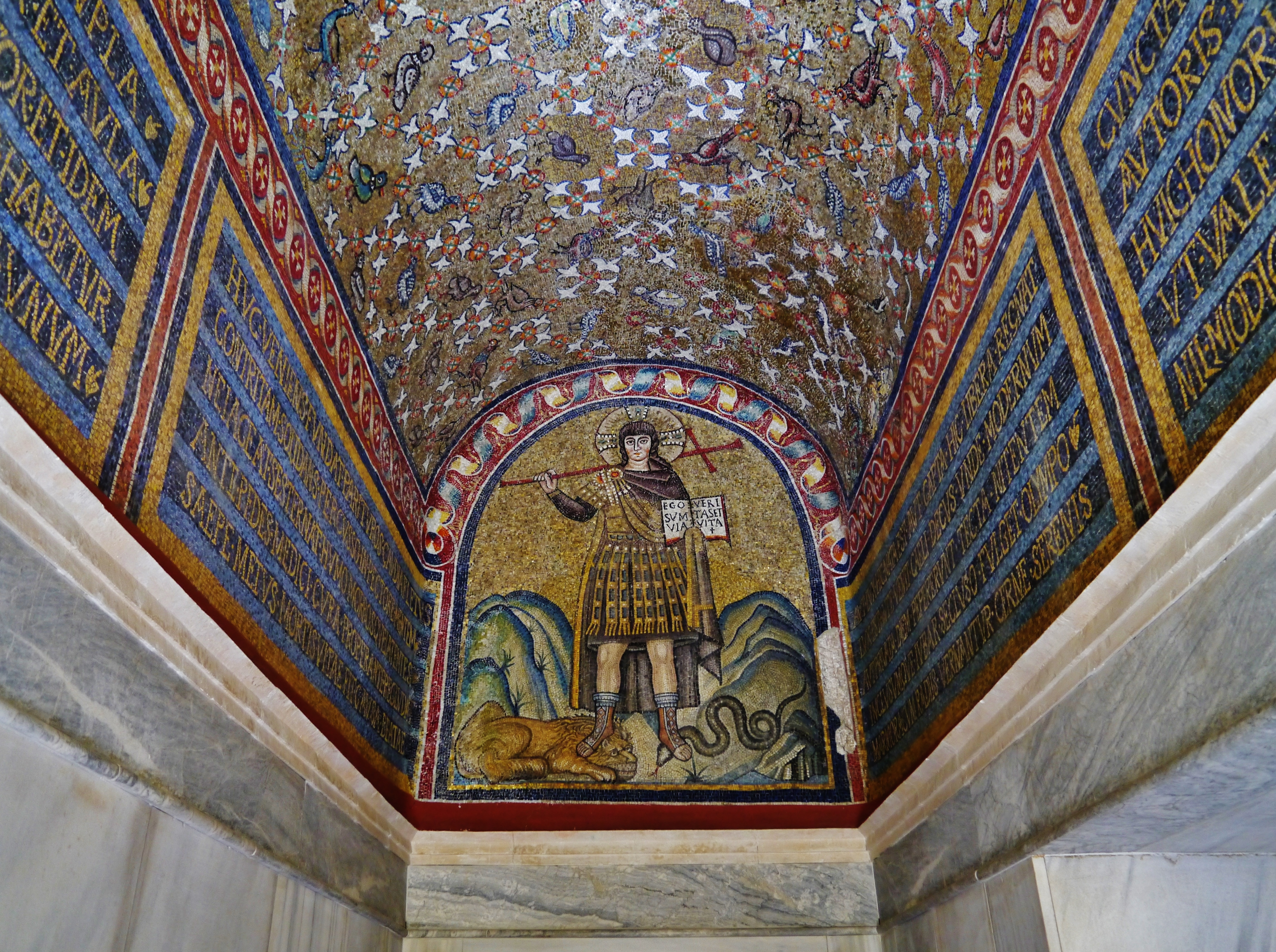

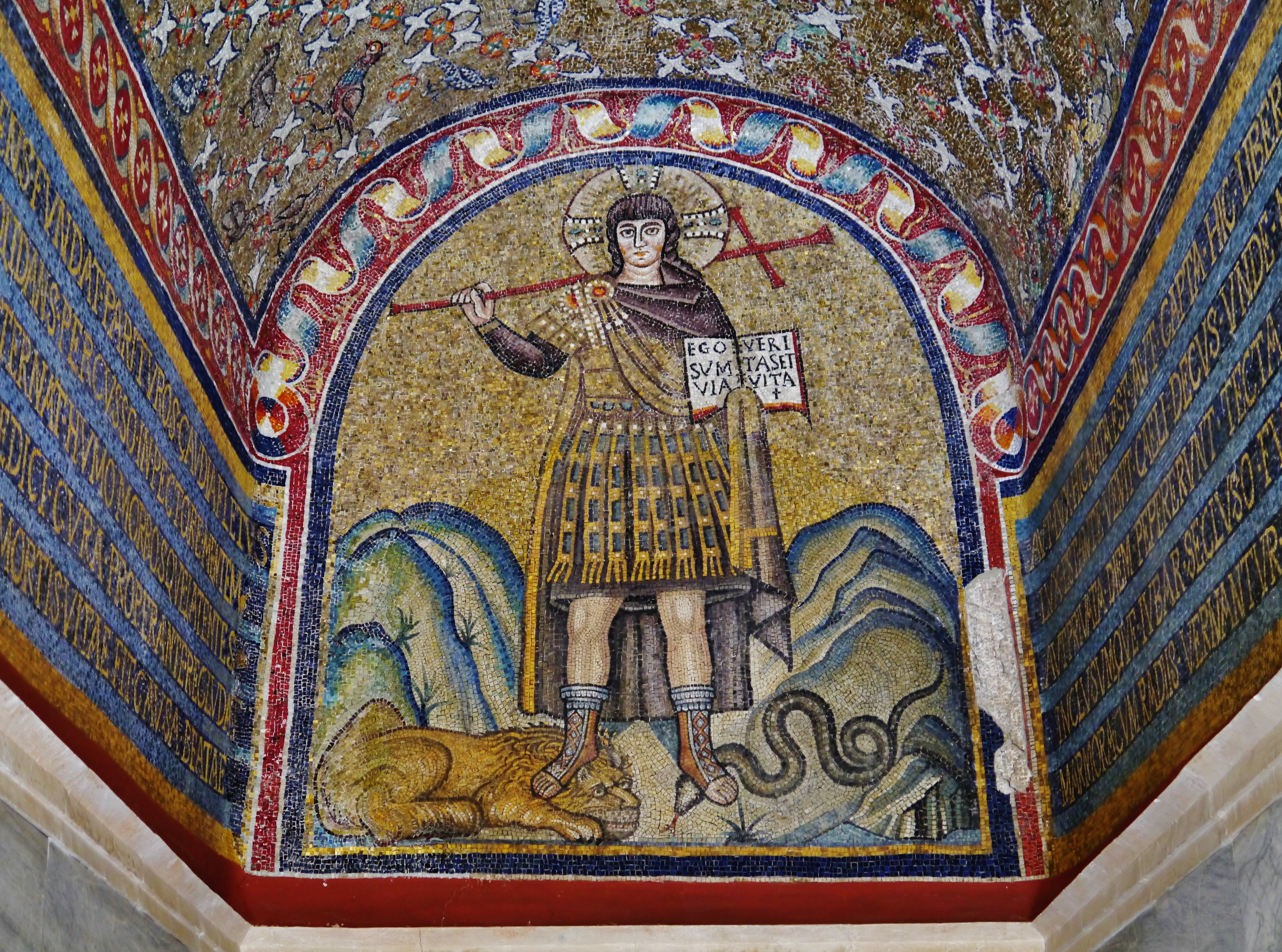

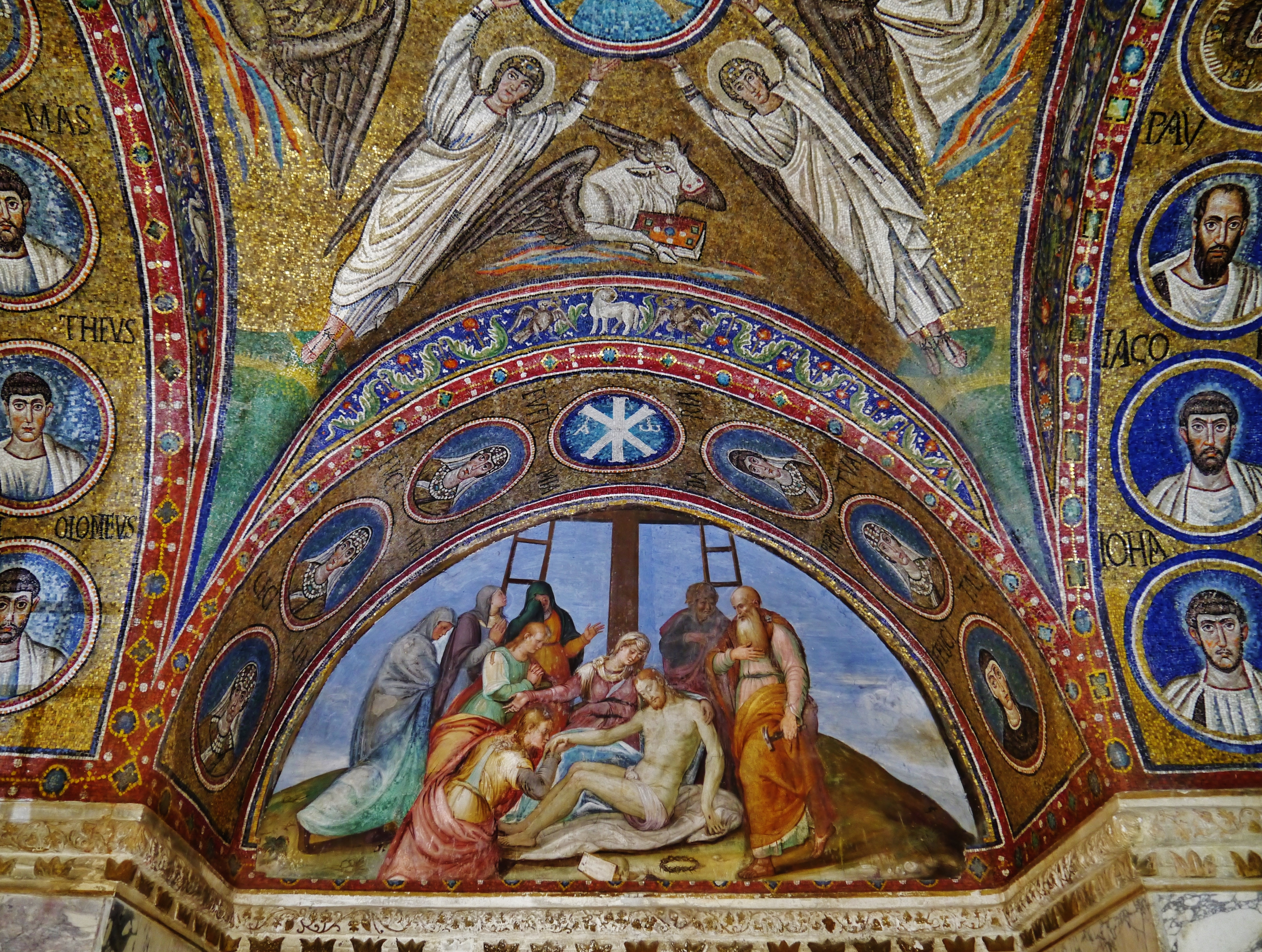
