= Wer unterm Schutz des Höchsten steht =

Christian German hymn

- Christian hymn
- Written: 1851
- Language: German
- Based on: Psalm 91
- Melody: after Michael Vehe
- Composed: 1537
- Published: 1972

"Wer unterm Schutz des Höchsten steht" (Whoever stands under the protection of the Most High) is a Christian hymn in German. The anonymous text, paraphrasing Psalm 91, appeared first in 1972 in a Protestant hymnal, with a 1537 melody from Michael Vehe's hymnal. It is contained in the Catholic hymnal Gotteslob.

== History ==
"Wer unterm Schutz des Höchsten steht" appeared first in 1972, then in the common Protestant hymnal Evangelisches Kirchengesangbuch (EKG). A paraphrase of Psalm 91, it is written in three stanzas. The associated melody came from the first Catholic hymnal that Michael Vehe published in 1537.

The hymn was included in the common German Catholic hymnal Gotteslob in 1975, as GL 291, and in the second edition as GL 423, in the section Leben in Gott / Vertrauen und Trost (Life in God / Trust and solace). It is a Psalmlied, a song that can be used instead of a liturgical psalm reading.

Johann Paul Zehetbauer composed a four-part setting. Gaël Liardon wrote a chorale prelude for organ. A chorale cantata for choir a cappella by Stephan Rommelspacher was published by Carus-Verlag in 2010, in a collection Chorbuch Trauer (Choir Book Memorial), aimed at public memorial services in cases of accidents and disasters. Walter Gleißner wrote an organ piece Meditation, published in 2014 by Dohr, in a collection Miniaturen für Orgel. A 2019 collection Tagzeitenliturgie mit dem Gotteslob for music to observe the liturgy of the hours, initiated by the Diocese of Mainz and published by Carus-Verlag, includes two choral settings of the song and one for organ.
