= Psalm 91 =

Biblical psalm

- "He that dwelleth in the secret place of the most High"
- Psalm of protection
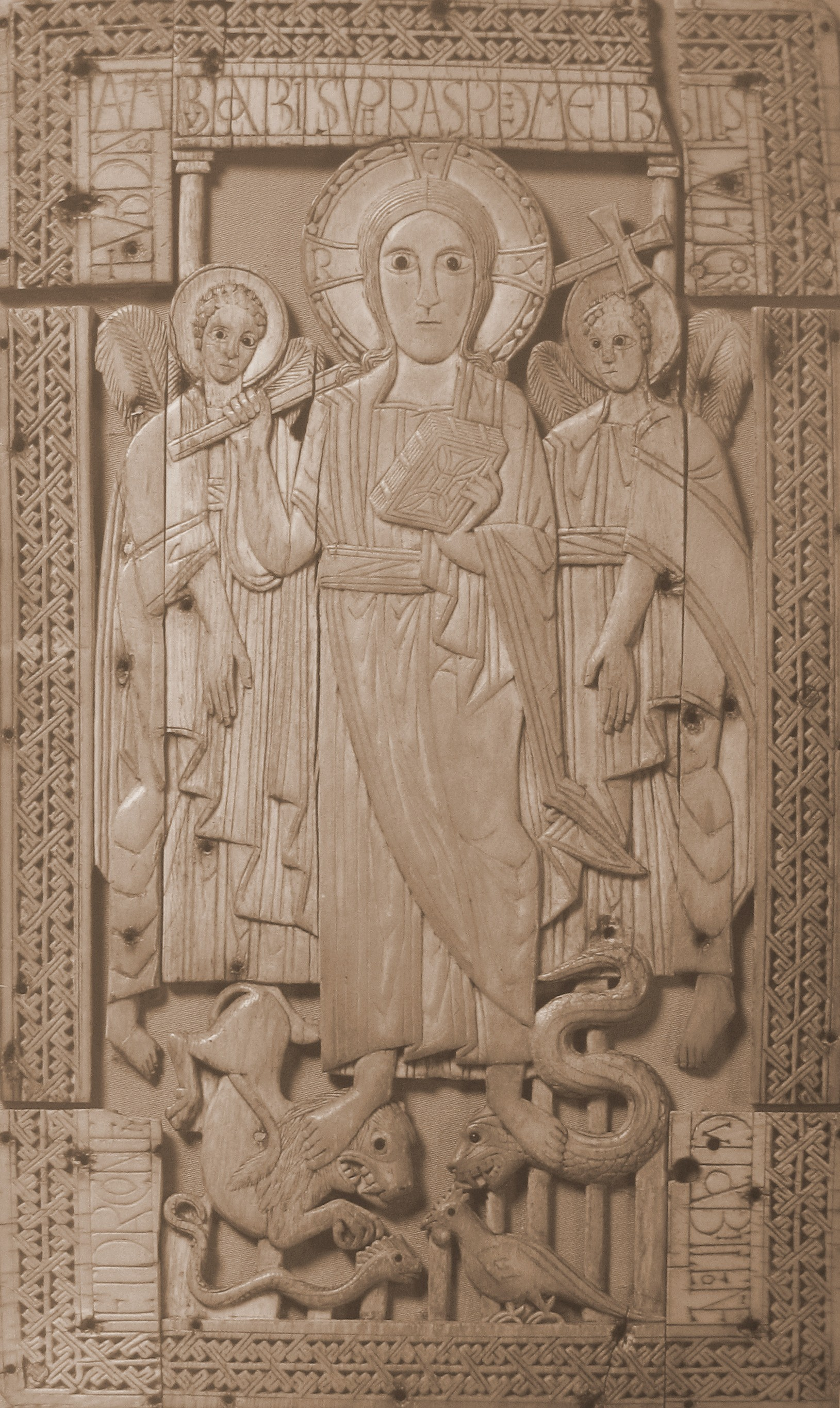
- Late 8th century ivory plaque with Christ treading on the beasts, illustrating verse 13. From Genoelselderen (in present-day Belgium).
- Other name: Psalm 90; "Qui habitat"
- Language: Hebrew (original)

Psalm 91
- ← Psalm 90 Psalm 92 →
- Book: Book of Psalms
- Hebrew Bible part: Ketuvim
- Order in the Hebrew part: 1
- Category: Sifrei Emet
- Christian Bible part: Old Testament
- Order in the Christian part: 19

Psalm 91 is the 91st psalm of the Book of Psalms, beginning in English in the King James Version: "He that dwelleth in the secret place of the most High shall abide under the shadow of the Almighty." In the slightly different numbering system used in the Greek Septuagint and Latin Vulgate translations of the Bible, this psalm is Psalm 90. In Latin, it is known as Qui habitat. As a psalm of protection, it is commonly invoked in times of hardship. Though no author is mentioned in the Hebrew text of this psalm, Jewish tradition ascribes it to Moses, with David compiling it in his Book of Psalms. The Septuagint translation attributes it to David.

The psalm forms a regular part of Jewish, Catholic, Eastern Orthodox, Lutheran, Anglican and other Protestant liturgies. The complete psalm and selected verses have often been set to music, notably by Heinrich Schütz and Felix Mendelssohn, who used verses for his motet Denn er hat seinen Engeln befohlen. The psalm has been paraphrased in hymns. The psalm was originally written in Biblical Hebrew. It is divided into 16 verses.

== Background and themes ==
The Midrash states that Psalm 91 was composed by Moses on the day he completed the building of the Tabernacle in the desert. The verses describe Moses's own experience entering the Tabernacle: "He that dwelleth in the secret place of the most High shall abide under the shadow of the Almighty". Midrash Tehillim and the Zohar teach that Moses composed this psalm while ascending into the cloud hovering over Mount Sinai, at which time he recited these words as protection from the angels of destruction.

In Jewish thought, Psalm 91 conveys the themes of God's protection and rescue from danger. The Talmud (Shevu'ot 15b) records opinions calling this psalm the "song of evil spirits" and the "song of plagues" ("shir shel pega'im" and "shir shel nega'im," respectively), for "one who recites it with faith in God will be helped by Him in time of danger". Since the times of the Geonim, this psalm was recited to drive away demons and evil spirits. According to midrashim, the psalm references many types of demons that threaten man, including the "Terror", "Arrow", "Pestilence", and "Destruction" mentioned in verses 5–6. The psalm was written in amulets by both Jews and Christians from the Late Antique period. According to the Talmud (Shevu'ot 15b), the subsequent verse, verse 7 ("A thousand shall fall at your side," etc.) is a reference to the demons which would perish upon recitation of this psalm. In the same vein, Psalm 91 was included as one of the "Four Psalms Against Demons" in Dead Sea Scroll 11QapocrPs, the other three psalms being previously unknown, which are thought to have been used by the Qumran community for exorcisms.

Modern-day Christians see the psalm as a source of comfort and protection, even in times of suffering. Commentator Alexander Kirkpatrick holds that

This exquisite Psalm may no doubt simply describe the security of the godly man under Jehovah’s protection amid the perils of his journey through life. But it gains in point and force if it is regarded as addressed to Israel in a crisis of its history.

Verse 13, in the King James Version "Thou shalt tread upon the lion and adder: the young lion and the dragon shalt thou trample under feet", was the origin of the iconography of Christ treading on the beasts, seen in the Late Antique period and revived in Carolingian and Anglo-Saxon art.

== Uses ==
=== New Testament ===
- Verses 11 and 12 are quoted by the devil during the temptation of Christ in Matthew 4:6 and Luke 4:10–11.
- Verse 13 is quoted in Luke 10:19.

=== Judaism ===
Psalm 91 is prominent in Jewish liturgy and ritual. It is recited during the Pesukei Dezimra in the Shabbat, Yom Tov, and, in many communities, on Hoshana Rabbah morning services. It is also recited after the evening prayer on Motza'ei Shabbat and during the nightly Bedtime Shema. In the contemporary custom, verse 16 is recited twice in each of these prayers, although the older Ashkenazic practice was to recite it twice only at the conclusion of the Sabbath. According to Machzor Vitry, the verse is doubled to complete the spelling of a name of God.

Psalm 91 is recited seven times during a burial ceremony. As the casket bearers approach the grave, they stop every few feet, repeating the psalm. In the case of the burial of a woman, the casket bearers do not stop the procession, but they do repeat the psalm seven times.

Verse 11 of the psalm is recited by some after the liturgical poem Shalom Aleichem at the Friday night meal.

Psalm 91 is often recited as a prayer for protection. Some say it before embarking on a journey.

=== Western Christianity ===
In Western Christianity it is often sung or recited during services of Compline. The psalm forms part of the Benedictine rite of the daily evening prayer Compline. After the Reform of the Roman Breviary by Pope Pius X it was only used on Sundays and Solemnities. In the Liturgy of the Hours it is part of Compline on the eve of Sunday and Solemnities.

In the Revised Common Lectionary (Year C) the psalm is appointed for the first Sunday in Lent, linking it to the temptation of Christ, where the devil quotes this psalm.

In the medieval Western Church it was included in the readings for Good Friday.

=== Eastern Orthodox Church ===
In the Eastern Orthodox Church, Psalm 90 (Psalm 91 in the Masoretic Text) is read daily at the Sixth Hour. It is part of the twelfth Kathisma division of the Psalter, read at Vespers on Wednesday evenings, as well as on Tuesdays and Thursdays during Lent, at Matins and the Ninth Hour, respectively. It is also read at Great Compline and at the Funeral service.

=== Coptic Orthodox Church ===
In the Agpeya, the Coptic Church's book of hours, this psalm is prayed in the office of Sext, as well as the first watch of the Midnight office. It is also in the prayer of the Veil, which is generally prayed only by monks.

== Musical settings ==
=== Hymns ===
The 1972 hymn in German, "Wer unterm Schutz des Höchsten steht", is a paraphrase of Psalm 91. "On Eagle's Wings" is a hymn composed by Michael Joncas in 1979, loosely based on this psalm.

=== Classical ===
Heinrich Schütz set a German metred version of Psalm 91 in the Becker Psalter, published in 1628, Wer sich des Höchsten Schirm vertraut, SWV 189.

Dmitry Bortniansky set Psalm 91 as Concerto No. 21 of his Choruses in Old Church Slavonic, Zhyvyi v pomoshshi Vyshnjago ("He That Dwelleth"). Felix Mendelssohn composed an eight-part motet based on verse 11 in German, Denn er hat seinen Engeln befohlen, and included it in his 1846 oratorio Elijah. Movement 9 of Benjamin Britten's The Company of Heaven, a major choral composition with soloists and orchestra first aired in 1937, sets verses 1, 9–13 for a cappella choir. with the densest vocal texture within the work for eight voices.

Polish composer Józef Elsner set the three last verses of as an offertorio, Quoniam in me speravit, Op.30, published c. 1829.

Josquin des Prez set the psalm as a motet for four and one for twenty four voices.

== In popular culture ==
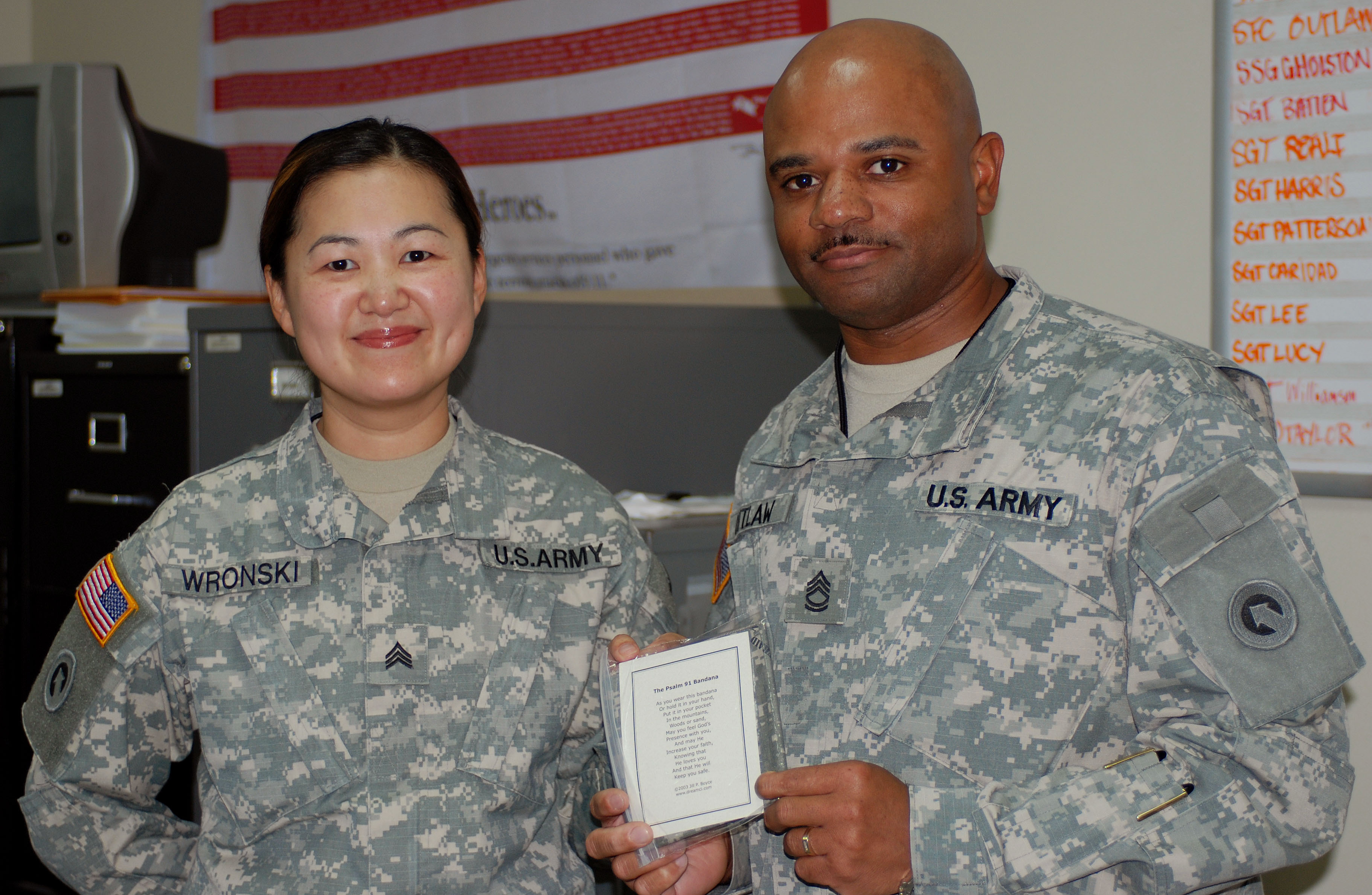
US military staffers hold a packet containing a camouflage bandana imprinted with Psalm 91 at the National Day of Prayer breakfast at Marine Corps Base Camp Lejeune, May 2010

Psalm 91 is known as the Soldier's Psalm or Soldier's Prayer. Camouflage bandanas imprinted with the psalm are often distributed to US troops.

In the 1946 film, Theirs Is the Glory, Kate ter Horst, reenacting the role she actually played in the Battle of Arnhem, reads Psalm 91 to wounded British soldiers who are sheltering in the basement of her house.

Sinéad O'Connor's debut album The Lion and the Cobra includes a recitation of verses 11–13 in Irish by singer Enya on the song "Never Get Old".

Canadian metal band Cryptopsy references verses 5–8 of the psalm in their song "The Pestilence That Walketh in Darkness" on their 2005 album Once Was Not.

Brazilian-American metal band Soulfly recited the psalm in Portuguese on the bonus track "Salmo-91" on their fifth album Dark Ages.

The Jerry Garcia Band quotes verses 5–6 in its song "My Sisters and Brothers".

Madonna references Psalm 91 in "Virgin Mary (Intro)" on her 2012 The MDNA Tour.

The psalm is recited in its entirety in the final boss of the second chapter of Faith: The Unholy Trinity.

Psalm 91 features in the 1990 short story "The Fenstanton Witch" by M. R. James.

The classic horror story Negotium Perambulans by E.F. Benson takes its title from part of the Latin rendition of verse six of Psalm 91 in reference to "the pestilence that walketh in darkness", the story being an account of a slug-like, vampiric demon that fears light and haunts an isolated fishing village in westernmost Cornwall.

"Negotium perambulans in tenebris" from the ninety-first Psalm. We should find it translated there, "the pestilence that walketh in darkness," which but feebly rendered the Latin. It was more deadly to the soul than any pestilence that can only kill the body: it was the Thing, the Creature, the Business that trafficked in the outer Darkness, a minister of God's wrath on the unrighteous. . . .

E.F. Benson Negotium Perambulans

== Text ==
The following table shows the Hebrew text of the Psalm with vowels, alongside the Koine Greek text in the Septuagint and the English translation from the King James Version. Note that the meaning can slightly differ between these versions, as the Septuagint and the Masoretic Text come from different textual traditions. (Note: A 1917 translation directly from Hebrew to English by the Jewish Publication Society can be found here or here, and an 1844 translation directly from the Septuagint by L. C. L. Brenton can be found here. Both translations are in the public domain.) In the Septuagint, this psalm is numbered Psalm 90.

#	Hebrew	English	Greek
1	יֹ֭שֵׁב בְּסֵ֣תֶר עֶלְי֑וֹן בְּצֵ֥ל שַׁ֝דַּ֗י יִתְלוֹנָֽן׃	He who dwells in the secret place of the Most High Shall abide under the shadow of the Almighty.	Αἶνος ᾠδῆς τῷ Δαυΐδ. - Ο ΚΑΤΟΙΚΩΝ ἐν βοηθείᾳ τοῦ ῾Υψίστου, ἐν σκέπῃ τοῦ Θεοῦ τοῦ οὐρανοῦ αὐλισθήσεται.
2	אֹמַ֗ר לַ֭יהֹוָה מַחְסִ֣י וּמְצוּדָתִ֑י אֱ֝לֹהַ֗י אֶבְטַח־בּֽוֹ׃	I will say of the Lord, “He is my refuge and my fortress; My God, in Him I will trust.”	ἐρεῖ τῷ Κυρίῳ· ἀντιλήπτωρ μου εἶ καὶ καταφυγή μου, ὁ Θεός μου, καὶ ἐλπιῶ ἐπ᾿ αὐτόν,
3	כִּ֤י ה֣וּא יַ֭צִּילְךָ מִפַּ֥ח יָק֗וּשׁ מִדֶּ֥בֶר הַוּֽוֹת׃	Surely He shall deliver you from the snare of the fowler And from the perilous pestilence.	ὅτι αὐτὸς ῥύσεταί σε ἐκ παγίδος θηρευτῶν καὶ ἀπὸ λόγου ταραχώδους.
4	בְּאֶבְרָת֨וֹ ׀ יָ֣סֶךְ לָ֭ךְ וְתַחַת־כְּנָפָ֣יו תֶּחְסֶ֑ה צִנָּ֖ה וְסֹחֵרָ֣ה אֲמִתּֽוֹ׃	He shall cover you with His feathers, And under His wings you shall take refuge; His truth shall be your shield and buckler.	ἐν τοῖς μεταφρένοις αὐτοῦ ἐπισκιάσει σοι, καὶ ὑπὸ τὰς πτέρυγας αὐτοῦ ἐλπιεῖς· ὅπλῳ κυκλώσει σε ἡ ἀλήθεια αὐτοῦ.
5	לֹֽא־תִ֭ירָא מִפַּ֣חַד לָ֑יְלָה מֵ֝חֵ֗ץ יָע֥וּף יוֹמָֽם׃	You shall not be afraid of the terror by night, Nor of the arrow that flies by day,	οὐ φοβηθήσῃ ἀπὸ φόβου νυκτερινοῦ, ἀπὸ βέλους πετομένου ἡμέρας,
6	מִ֭דֶּבֶר בָּאֹ֣פֶל יַהֲלֹ֑ךְ מִ֝קֶּ֗טֶב יָשׁ֥וּד צׇהֳרָֽיִם׃	Nor of the pestilence that walks in darkness, Nor of the destruction that lays waste at noonday.	ἀπὸ πράγματος ἐν σκότει διαπορευομένου, ἀπὸ συμπτώματος καὶ δαιμονίου μεσημβρινοῦ.
7	יִפֹּ֤ל מִצִּדְּךָ֨ ׀ אֶ֗לֶף וּרְבָבָ֥ה מִימִינֶ֑ךָ אֵ֝לֶ֗יךָ לֹ֣א יִגָּֽשׁ׃	A thousand may fall at your side, And ten thousand at your right hand; But it shall not come near you.	πεσεῖται ἐκ τοῦ κλίτους σου χιλιὰς καὶ μυριὰς ἐκ δεξιῶν σου, πρὸς σὲ δὲ οὐκ ἐγγιεῖ·
8	רַ֭ק בְּעֵינֶ֣יךָ תַבִּ֑יט וְשִׁלֻּמַ֖ת רְשָׁעִ֣ים תִּרְאֶֽה׃	Only with your eyes shall you look, And see the reward of the wicked.	πλὴν τοῖς ὀφθαλμοῖς σου κατανοήσεις καὶ ἀνταπόδοσιν ἁμαρτωλῶν ὄψει.
9	כִּֽי־אַתָּ֣ה יְהֹוָ֣ה מַחְסִ֑י עֶ֝לְי֗וֹן שַׂ֣מְתָּ מְעוֹנֶֽךָ׃	Because you have made the Lord, who is my refuge, Even the Most High, your dwelling place,	ὅτι σύ, Κύριε, ἡ ἐλπίς μου· τὸν ῞Υψιστον ἔθου καταφυγήν σου.
10	לֹא־תְאֻנֶּ֣ה אֵלֶ֣יךָ רָעָ֑ה וְ֝נֶ֗גַע לֹא־יִקְרַ֥ב בְּאׇהֳלֶֽךָ׃	No evil shall befall you, Nor shall any plague come near your dwelling;	οὐ προσελεύσεται πρὸς σὲ κακά, καὶ μάστιξ οὐκ ἐγγιεῖ ἐν τῷ σκηνώματί σου.
11	כִּ֣י מַ֭לְאָכָיו יְצַוֶּה־לָּ֑ךְ לִ֝שְׁמׇרְךָ֗ בְּכׇל־דְּרָכֶֽיךָ׃	For He shall give His angels charge over you, To keep you in all your ways.	ὅτι τοῖς ἀγγέλοις αὐτοῦ ἐντελεῖται περὶ σοῦ τοῦ διαφυλάξαι σε ἐν πάσαις ταῖς ὁδοῖς σου·
12	עַל־כַּפַּ֥יִם יִשָּׂא֑וּנְךָ פֶּן־תִּגֹּ֖ף בָּאֶ֣בֶן רַגְלֶֽךָ׃	In their hands they shall bear you up, Lest you dash your foot against a stone.	ἐπὶ χειρῶν ἀροῦσί σε, μήποτε προσκόψῃς πρὸς λίθον τὸν πόδα σου·
13	עַל־שַׁ֣חַל וָפֶ֣תֶן תִּדְרֹ֑ךְ תִּרְמֹ֖ס כְּפִ֣יר וְתַנִּֽין׃	You shall tread upon the lion and the cobra, The young lion and the serpent you shall trample underfoot.	ἐπὶ ἀσπίδα καὶ βασιλίσκον ἐπιβήσῃ καὶ καταπατήσεις λέοντα καὶ δράκοντα.
14	כִּ֤י בִ֣י חָ֭שַׁק וַאֲפַלְּטֵ֑הוּ אֲ֝שַׂגְּבֵ֗הוּ כִּֽי־יָדַ֥ע שְׁמִֽי׃	“Because he has set his love upon Me, therefore I will deliver him; I will set him on high, because he has known My name.	ὅτι ἐπ᾿ ἐμὲ ἤλπισε, καὶ ρύσομαι αὐτόν· σκεπάσω αὐτόν, ὅτι ἔγνω τὸ ὄνομά μου.
15	יִקְרָאֵ֨נִי ׀ וְֽאֶעֱנֵ֗הוּ עִמּֽוֹ־אָנֹכִ֥י בְצָרָ֑ה אֲ֝חַלְּצֵ֗הוּ וַאֲכַבְּדֵֽהוּ׃	He shall call upon Me, and I will answer him; I will be with him in trouble; I will deliver him and honor him.	κεκράξεται πρός με, καὶ ἐπακούσομαι αὐτοῦ, μετ᾿ αὐτοῦ εἰμι ἐν θλίψει· ἐξελοῦμαι αὐτόν, καὶ δοξάσω αὐτόν.
16	אֹ֣רֶךְ יָ֭מִים אַשְׂבִּיעֵ֑הוּ וְ֝אַרְאֵ֗הוּ בִּישׁוּעָתִֽי׃	With long life I will satisfy him, And show him My salvation.	μακρότητι ἡμερῶν ἐμπλήσω αὐτὸν καὶ δείξω αὐτῷ τὸ σωτήριόν μου.

=== Verse 2 ===
I will say of the Lord, "He is my refuge and my fortress;
My God, in Him I will trust".

Kirkpatrick notes that the use of the first person in this verse and the first part of verse 9, followed in each case by the second person, is "somewhat perplexing". Many commentators argue that the text is corrupt and amend it. Kirkpartick argues that "The two occurrences of the first person mutually support one another. If the interpretation suggested above is adopted [that the text is addressed to Israel], Psalm 91:1–2 [and] Psalm 91:9a will be the profession of the Psalmist’s faith, on the strength of which he addresses to Israel the comforting words of Psalm 91:3 ff. [and] Psalm 91:9b ff."

== Sources ==
- Horowitz, Shimon Halevi (1923). Machzor Vitry (in Hebrew) (reprint ed.).
- Kaplan, Rabbi Aryeh (1990). Innerspace: Introduction to Kabbalah, Meditation and Prophecy. Moznaim.
- Kraus, Thomas J. (2009), "'He That Dwelleth in the Help of the Highest': Septuagint Psalm 90 and the Iconographic Program on Byzantine Armbands", in Evans, Craig A.; Zacharias, H. Daniel (eds.), Jewish and Christian Scripture as Artifact and Canon, Bloomsbury Publishing, p. 139, ISBN 978-0-56735188-3
- Matt, Daniel Chanan, ed. (2004). The Zohar. Vol. 1. Stanford University Press. ISBN 978-0-80474747-9.
- Reif, Stefan C. (2004), "The Bible in Jewish Life and Thought", in Berlin, Adele; Brettler, Marc Zvi (eds.), The Jewish Study Bible, Oxford University Press, ISBN 978-0-19529751-5
- Ruth, Peggy Joyce (2012). Psalm 91 Military Edition: God's Shield of Protection. Charisma Media. ISBN 978-1-61638708-2.
- Scherman, Rabbi Nosson (2003). The Complete Artscroll Siddur (3rd ed.). Mesorah Publications. ISBN 978-0-89906650-9.
- Schiffman, Lawrence H., ed. (1992). Hebrew and Aramaic Incantation Texts from the Cairo Genizah. A&C Black. ISBN 978-1-85075285-1.
- Würthwein, Ernst (1995). The Text of the Old Testament. Translated by Rhodes, Erroll F. Grand Rapids, MI: William B. Eerdmans. ISBN 0-8028-0788-7.
