= Durham Cassiodorus =

8th-century illuminated manuscript

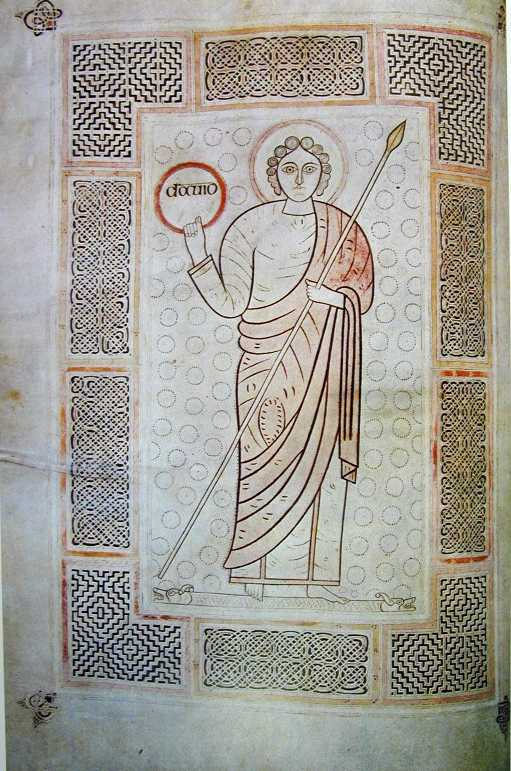
Illustration of David as Victor from the Durham Cassiodorus.

The Durham Cassiodorus (Durham, Cathedral Library, MS B. II. 30) is an 8th-century illuminated manuscript containing an abbreviation of Cassiodorus's Explanation of the Psalms. The manuscript was produced in Northumbria in about 730, and remains in the north-east of England in the library of Durham Cathedral.

The original text from Cassiodorus was heavily edited, leaving barely any original text written by him.

The codex has 261 surviving folios. It is the earliest known copy of the commentary written by Cassiodorus in the sixth century and the hands of six scribes have been identified within it.

== Illustrations ==
The manuscript contains two surviving miniatures of King David, one of David as Victor (right) and an early example of David as a Musician. A third miniature is known to have existed, probably prefacing the text, but does not survive.
