= Historicity of the Gospels =

New Testament gospels as historical documents

The historical reliability of the Gospels is a subject of ongoing scholarly debate. Virtually all scholars of antiquity agree that Jesus of Nazareth existed in 1st-century Judaea in the Southern Levant, but there is much disagreement around specific accounts, such as his nativity and his resurrection; the only two events with almost universal assent are that he was baptised by John the Baptist and that he was crucified by order of Pontius Pilate, a Roman prefect.

According to the majority viewpoint, the three Synoptic Gospels are the primary sources of historical information about Jesus and his religious movement. The fourth canonical gospel differs greatly from the other three; (Note: Historians often study the historical reliability of the Acts of the Apostles when studying the reliability of the gospels, as it is the view of virtually all scholars that The Acts of the Apostles was written by the same author as the Gospel of Luke.) it has been viewed as less historical, but since the Third Quest, it has been considered more reliable than previously thought or even more reliable than the Synoptics. The Gospels are commonly seen as literature that is based on oral traditions, Christian preaching, and Old Testament exegesis, with the consensus being that they are a variation of Greco-Roman biography similar to other ancient works such as Xenophon's Memoirs of Socrates or Plutarch's Life of Alexander and Life of Caesar. Typically, ancient biographies were written shortly after the death of the subject and included substantial history.

Historians analyze the Gospels critically, attempting to differentiate reliable information from possible inventions, exaggerations, and alterations. Scholars use textual criticism to resolve questions arising from textual variations among the numerous extant manuscripts to decide the wording of a text closest to the "original". Scholars seek to answer questions of authorship and date and purpose of composition, and they look at internal and external sources to determine the gospel traditions' reliability. Historical reliability does not depend on a source's inerrancy or lack of agenda since some sources (e.g. Josephus) are considered generally reliable despite having such traits.

== Methodology ==
In evaluating the Gospels' historical reliability, scholars consider authorship and date of composition, intention and genre, gospel sources and oral tradition, textual criticism, and the historical authenticity of sayings and narrative events.

=== Scope and genre ===
"Gospels" is the standard term for the four New Testament books carrying the names of Matthew, Mark, Luke and John, each recounting the life and teachings of Jesus of Nazareth (including his dealings with John the Baptist, his trial and execution, the discovery of his empty tomb, and, at least in three of them, his appearances to his disciples after his death).

The genre of the gospels is essential in understanding the authors' intentions regarding the texts' historical value. New Testament scholar Graham Stanton writes, "the gospels are now widely considered to be a sub-set of the broad ancient literary genre of biographies." Charles Talbert was an early pioneer for the gospels as biography; while reviews were mixed, he decisively shifted scholarly views on genre. Richard Burridge provided arguably the most significant contribution, finding enough similarities between the gospels and ten contemporary bioi to demonstrate a family resemblance. M. David Litwa argues that the gospels belonged to the genre of "mythic historiography", where miracles and other fantastical elements were narrated in less sensationalist ways and the events were considered to have actually occurred by the readers of the time. Alan Kirk critiques genre essentialism in gospels scholarship and rejects Litwa’s conclusion that the gospels are myths historicized based on their realistic historical complexion and his exaggeration of the influence of Greek myth. Craig S. Keener argues that the gospels are ancient biographies whose authors, like other ancient biographers at the time, were concerned with describing accurately the life and ministry of Jesus. The same genre as Plutarch's Life of Alexander and Life of Caesar, which were typically ancient biographies written shortly after the death of the subject and included substantial history. Although the biographical nature of the gospels has been challenged by some because of their agendas to glorify Jesus and theological interests, such features are expected, given that all biographies feature ideological coloring, with works by Suetonius and Plutarch serving moralizing purposes. 20th century form critics such as Rudolf Bultmann and Leiva-Merikakis viewed the gospels as unique, sui generis phenomena, but today the dominant scholarly view understands the gospels as examples of ancient biography.

Scholars agree Luke-Acts applied the methods of Hellenistic historiography to write some form of history. Attitudes towards the historicity of Acts have ranged widely across scholarship in different countries. Regardless, EP Sanders claimed that the sources for Jesus are superior to the ones for Alexander the Great.

Jeffrey Tripp observes a scholarly trend advocating for the reliability of memory and the oral gospel traditions.

New Testament scholar James D.G. Dunn believed that "the earliest tradents within the Christian churches [were] preservers more than innovators ... seeking to transmit, retell, explain, interpret, elaborate, but not create de novo ... Through the main body of the Synoptic tradition, I believe, we have in most cases direct access to the teaching and ministry of Jesus as it was remembered from the beginning of the transmission process (which often predates Easter) and so fairly direct access to the ministry and teaching of Jesus through the eyes and ears of those who went about with him." Anthony Le Donne, a leading memory researcher in Jesus studies, elaborated on Dunn's thesis, basing "his historiography squarely on Dunn's thesis that the historical Jesus is the memory of Jesus recalled by the earliest disciples". According to Le Donne as explained by his reviewer, Benjamin Simpson, memories are fractured, and not exact recalls of the past. Le Donne further argues that the remembrance of events is facilitated by relating it to a common story, or "type". This means the Jesus-tradition is not a theological invention of the early Church, but rather a tradition shaped and refracted through such memory "type". Le Donne too supports a conservative view on typology compared to some other scholars, transmissions involving eyewitnesses, and ultimately a stable tradition resulting in little invention in the Gospels. Le Donne expressed himself thusly vis-a-vis more skeptical scholars, "He (Dale Allison) does not read the gospels as fiction, but even if these early stories derive from memory, memory can be frail and often misleading. While I do not share Allison's point of departure (i.e. I am more optimistic), I am compelled by the method that came from it."

Dale Allison emphasizes the weakness of human memory, referring to its 'many sins' and how it frequently misguides people. He expresses skepticism at other scholars' endeavors to identify authentic sayings of Jesus. Instead of isolating and authenticating individual pericopae, Allison advocates for a methodology focused on identifying patterns and finding what he calls 'recurrent attestation'. Allison argues that the general impressions left by the Gospels should be trusted, though he is more skeptical on the details; if they are broadly unreliable, then our sources almost certainly cannot have preserved any of the particulars. Opposing preceding approaches where the Gospels are historically questionable and must be rigorously sifted through by competent scholars for nuggets of information, Allison argues that the Gospels are generally accurate and often 'got Jesus right'. Dale Allison finds apocalypticism to be recurrently attested, among various other themes. Reviewing his work, Rafael Rodriguez largely agrees with Allison's methodology and conclusions while arguing that Allison's discussion on memory is too one-sided, noting that memory "is nevertheless sufficiently stable to authentically bring the past to bear on the present" and that people are beholden to memory's successes in everyday life.

According to Bruce Chilton and Craig Evans, "the Judaism of the period treated such traditions very carefully, and the New Testament writers in numerous passages applied to apostolic traditions the same technical terminology found elsewhere in Judaism ... In this way they both identified their traditions as 'holy word' and showed their concern for a careful and ordered transmission of it." David Jenkins, a former Anglican Bishop of Durham and university professor, has said, "Certainly not! There is absolutely no certainty in the New Testament about anything of importance."

Chris Keith has called for the employment of social memory theory regarding the memories transmitted by the Gospels over the traditional form-critical approach emphasizing a distinction between 'authentic' and 'inauthentic' tradition. Keith observes that the memories presented by the Gospels can contradict and are not always historically correct. Chris Keith argues that the Historical Jesus was the one who could create these memories, both true or not. For instance, Mark and Luke disagree on how Jesus came back to the synagogue, with the likely more accurate Mark arguing he was rejected for being an artisan, while Luke portrays Jesus as literate and his refusal to heal in Nazareth as cause of his dismissal. Keith does not view Luke's account as a fabrication since different eyewitnesses would have perceived and remembered differently.

While believing that the study of the process of conversion from memories of Jesus into the Gospel tradition are too complicated for more simplistic a priori arguments the Gospels are reliable, Alan Kirk criticizes allegations of memory distortion common in Biblical studies. Kirk finds that much research in psychology involves experimentation in labs decontextualized from the real world, making use of their results dubious, hence the rise of what he calls 'ecological' approaches to memory. Kirk claims that social contagion is one phenomenon that is greatly lessened or even ruled out by new study. Kirk claims that there is also an imprudent reliance on a binary distinction between exact information and later interpretation in research. Kirk argues that the demise of form criticism means that the Gospels can no longer be automatically considered unreliable and that skeptics must now find new options, such as the aforementioned efforts at using evidence of memory distortion. Reviewing Kirk's essay "Cognition, Commemoration, and Tradition: Memory and the Historiography of Jesus Research" (2010), biblical scholar Judith Redman provides a reflection based on her view of memory research:

They [The Gospels] are not ordinary historical accounts and cannot be treated as though they are, but nor are they simply ahistorical materials designed to convince the reader of the author's particular theological perspective. That we have increasing scientific evidence of this has important implications for Christians, but does not, I think, invalidate the preceding two millennia of faith.

Alongside his work defining the Gospels as ancient biography, Craig Keener, drawing on the works of previous studies by Dunn, Kirk, Kenneth Bailey, and Robert McIver, among many others, utilizes memory theory and oral tradition to argue that the Gospels are in many ways historically accurate. His work has been endorsed by Richard Bauckham, Markus Bockmuehl, and David Aune, among others.

=== Criteria ===
Critical scholars have developed a number of criteria to evaluate the probability or historical authenticity of an attested event or saying in the gospels. These criteria are the criterion of dissimilarity; the criterion of embarrassment; the criterion of multiple attestation; the criterion of cultural and historical congruency; and the criterion of "Aramaisms". They are applied to the sayings and events described in the Gospels to evaluate their historical reliability.

The criterion of dissimilarity argues that if a saying or action is dissimilar or contrary to the views of Judaism in the context of Jesus or the views of the early church, then it can more confidently be regarded as an authentic saying or action of Jesus. Commonly cited examples of this are Jesus's controversial reinterpretation of Mosaic law in his Sermon on the Mount and Peter's decision to allow uncircumcised gentiles into what was at the time a sect of Judaism.

The criterion of embarrassment holds that the authors of the gospels had no reason to invent embarrassing incidents such as Peter's denial of Jesus or the fleeing of Jesus's followers after his arrest, and therefore such details would likely not have been included unless they were true. Bart Ehrman, using the criterion of dissimilarity to judge the historical reliability of the claim that Jesus was baptized by John the Baptist, writes, "it is hard to imagine a Christian inventing the story of Jesus' baptism since this could be taken to mean that he was John's subordinate."

The criterion of multiple attestation says that when two or more independent sources present similar or consistent accounts, it is more likely that the accounts are accurate reports of events or that they are reporting a tradition that predates the sources.

The criterion of cultural and historical congruency says that a source is less credible if the account contradicts known historical facts, or if it conflicts with cultural practices common in the period in question.

The criterion of "Aramaisms" is that if a saying of Jesus has Aramaic roots, reflecting his Palestinian cultural context, it is more likely to be authentic than a saying that lacks Aramaic roots. The consensus among scholars is that Jesus spoke Aramaic, whereas the canonical gospels were all originally written in Koine Greek.

== Formation and sources ==
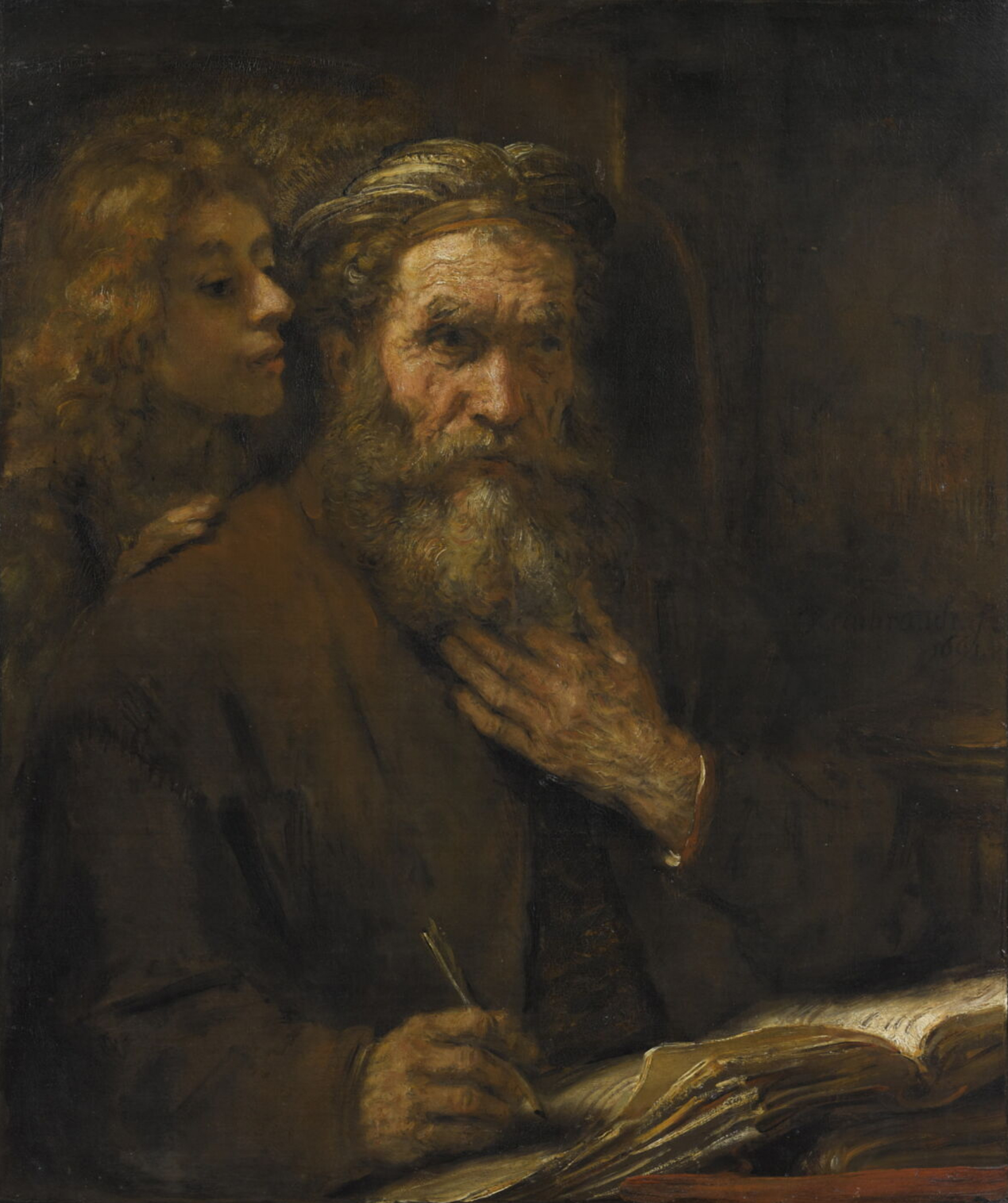
Evangelist Mattheüs en de engel by Rembrandt, 1661

=== From oral traditions to written gospels ===
The form critics of the twentieth century viewed the gospels as compilers of tradition analogous to other collections of folktales by primitive communities steeped in eschatology, but today scholars recognize the gospels as Greco-Roman biographies by conscious authors with their own theological agendas. (Note: Reddish argues expectations of Jesus’s return slowed writing, though Bond notes apocalypticism was no barrier to the production of written texts, as seen by the number of Jewish apocalypses composed during the period. (Note: Most scholars believe that the historical Jesus was an apocalyptic prophet who predicted the imminent end or transformation of the world, though others, notably the Jesus Seminar, disagree.) Many scholars argue that a conditional understanding of eschatology is present in the gospels, with the date of the parousia being dependent on repentance rather than being fixed. The death of witnesses and missionary needs of the church led to increased demand for writings about Jesus.) Burkett summarizes the rise of the gospels as first oral tradition, written collections of stories and sayings, proto-gospels, and the canonical gospels composed using such sources. According to Chris Keith, there is no incontrovertible evidence the gospel traditions circulated as written narratives, testimonia, or notes prior to Mark.

The New Testament preserves signs of these oral traditions and early documents: parallel passages between Matthew, Mark and Luke and the Pauline epistles and the Epistle to the Hebrews on the other are typically explained by assuming that all were relying on a shared oral tradition, and the dedicatory preface of Luke refers to previous written accounts of the life of Jesus. The early traditions were fluid and subject to alteration, sometimes transmitted by those who had known Jesus personally, but more often by wandering prophets and teachers like the Apostle Paul, who did not know him personally. Jens Schroter argued that a mass of material from various sources, such as Christian prophets issuing sayings in the name of Jesus, the Hebrew Bible, miscellaneous sayings, alongside the actual words of Jesus, were all attributed by the Gospels to the singular historical Jesus. Helen Bond also argues that many chreia found in the gospels are literary creations composed by the evangelists rather than reservoirs of oral tradition; while many are rooted in actual history, they have been reshaped to emphasize aspects of Jesus. James DG Dunn and Tucker Ferda point out that the early Christian tradition sought to distinguish between their own sayings and those of the historical Jesus and that there is little evidence that the claims of new "prophets" often became mistaken as those of Jesus himself; Ferda notes that the phenomena of prophetic sayings merging with those of Jesus is more relevant to the dialogue gospels of the 2nd and 3nd centuries. The accuracy of the oral gospel tradition was ensured by the community designating certain learned individuals to bear the main responsibility for retaining the gospel message of Jesus. The prominence of teachers in early communities such as the Jerusalem Church is best explained by the communities' reliance on them as repositories of oral tradition. The early prophets and leaders of Christian communities and their followers were more focused on the Kingdom of God than on the life of Jesus: Paul for example, says very little about him such as he was "born of a woman" (meaning that he was a man and not a phantom), that he was a Jew, and that he suffered, died, and was resurrected: what mattered for Paul was not Jesus's teachings or the details of his death and resurrection, but the kingdom. Nonetheless, Paul was personally acquainted with Peter and John, two of Jesus' original disciples, and James, the brother of Jesus. Paul's first meeting with Peter and James was approximately 36 AD, close to the time of the crucifixion (30 or 33 AD.) Paul was a contemporary of Jesus and, according to some, from Paul's writings alone, a fairly full outline of the life of Jesus can found: his descent from Abraham and David, his upbringing in the Jewish Law, gathering together disciples, including Cephas (Peter) and John, having a brother named James, living an exemplary life, the Last Supper and betrayal, numerous details surrounding his death and resurrection (e.g. crucifixion, Jewish involvement in putting him to death, burial, resurrection, seen by Peter, James, the twelve and others) along with numerous quotations referring to notable teachings and events found in the Gospels.

Between 120 and 150, Justin Martyr, who lived in 2nd-century Flavia Neapolis (Biblical Shechem, modern day Nablus) mentioned the "memoirs of the Apostles" in his First Apology. Later, around 173, Tatian, who was a student of Justin Martyr, assembled a single gospel account, working from the four canonical gospels. Around 185 Irenaeus, a bishop of Lyon who lived c. 130 – c. 202, attributed them to: 1) Matthew, an apostle who followed Jesus in his earthly career; 2) Mark, who while himself not a disciple was the companion of Peter, who was; 3) Luke, the companion of Paul, the author of the Pauline epistles; and 4) John, who like Matthew was an apostle who had known Jesus. According to Bart Ehrman, most scholars agree that they are the work of unknown Christians, though according to Dale Allison the traditional attributions of Mark and Luke still have "learned defenders", with Raymond Brown judging critical opinion on Luke's authorship to be roughly evenly divided near the end of the 20th century. The gospels were composed c. 65–110 AD. Most scholars also agree that the Gospels do not contain direct eyewitness accounts, though this may partly be the result of dubious assumptions based on form criticism. (Note: Eve:To be sure the majority view of New Testament scholarship is that the Gospels do not contain eyewitness accounts, but this may in part be due to a habit of thought arising from the long dominance of form-critical assumptions, which the previous chapters of this book have shown to be suspect.) The Gospels are commonly seen as literature that is based on oral traditions, Christian preaching, and Old Testament exegesis with the consensus being that they are a variation of Greco-Roman biography; similar to other ancient works such as Xenophon's Memoirs of Socrates. Typically, ancient biographies were written shortly after the death of the subject and included substantial history. The validity of the communities model of gospel origins has been subject to increasing skepticism, and there is no current consensus on constructs such as the Johannine Community. Nevertheless, they preserve sources that go back to Jesus and his contemporaries, and the Synoptic writers thought that they were reconfiguring memories of Jesus rather than creating theological stories, (Note: Allison: "Despite the required hesitation, my inference, after taking everything into account, remains conventional: our Synoptic writers thought that they were reconfiguring memories of Jesus, not inventing theological tales. Such a supposition, however, does nothing to clarify whether or not the evangelists were right about the mnemonic nature of their traditions.") "draw[ing] on direct memories of the first generation of Jesus' disciples".

=== The synoptics: Matthew, Mark and Luke ===
Matthew, Mark and Luke are called the synoptic gospels because they share many pericopae, sometimes even identical in wording; finding an explanation for their relationship is known as the synoptic problem, and most scholars believe that the best solution to the problem is that Mark was the first gospel to be written and served as the source for the other two, Since the third quest for the historical Jesus, the four gospels and noncanonical texts have been viewed with more confidence as sources to reconstruct the life of Jesus compared to the previous quests.

Matthew and Luke also share a large amount of material not found in Mark, leading supporters of the popular Two-source hypothesis to conclude they shared a source called Q, though alternative theories dispensing with Q are growing in popularity among scholars. A. M. Honoré offers a statistical classification of the number of words in the single, double, and triple traditions.

Matthew and Luke's unique content includes some of the best-known stories in the gospels, such as the birth of Christ, the Parable of the Good Samaritan, and the Parable of the Pearl of Great Price.

The Hebrew scriptures were also an important source for all three Synoptic Gospels and for John. Direct quotations number 27 in Mark, 54 in Matthew, 24 in Luke, and 14 in John, and the influence of the scriptures is vastly increased when allusions and echoes are included. Half of Mark's gospel is made up of allusions to and citations of the scriptures, which he uses to structure his narrative and to present his understanding of the ministry, passion, death and resurrection of Jesus (for example, the final cry from the cross, "My God, my God, why have you forsaken me?" is an exact quotation from Psalm 22:1). Matthew contains all Mark's quotations and introduces around 30 more, sometimes in the mouth of Jesus, sometimes as his own commentary on the narrative, and Luke makes allusions to all but three of the Old Testament books.

=== Mark ===
Tradition holds that the gospel was written by Mark the Evangelist, St. Peter's interpreter. Gerd Theissen writes that Mark's reliance on several underlying sources, varying in form and in theology, makes this unlikely, while Nicholas Elder argues that Mark is an oral composition where a speaker's words are recorded, which coheres with the patristic tradition. Most scholars believe it was written shortly before or after the fall of Jerusalem and the destruction of the Second Temple in the year 70, and internal evidence suggests that it probably originated in Syria among a Christian community consisting at least partly of non-Jews who spoke Greek rather than Aramaic. Michael Kok finds claims that the author of Mark was ignorant of Palestinian geography or customs to be unwarranted.

Scholars since the 19th century have regarded Mark as the first of the gospels. A scholarly consensus identifies Mark and the other gospels as ancient biography, which typically included substantial history. Mark preserves memories of real people (including the disciples), places and circumstances, but there has been increasing skepticism towards efforts to find pre-Markan traditions and sources.

In 1901 William Wrede demonstrated that Mark was not a simple historical account of the life of Jesus but a work of theology compiled by an author who was a creative artist. Among the works that the author of Mark may have drawn from are the Elijah-Elisha narrative in the Book of Kings, the Pauline letters, notably 1 Corinthians, as well as the works of Homer. According to Adam Winn, Mark is a counter-narrative to the myth of Imperial rule crafted by Vespasian.

Advancing a minority view among scholars, Maurice Casey argued that Mark's gospel contains traces of literal translations of Aramaic sources, and that this implies, in some cases, a Sitz im Leben in the lifetime of Jesus and a very early date for the gospel.

=== Matthew and Luke ===
The consensus of scholars dates Matthew and Luke to 80–90 AD. (Note: Matthew and Luke both use Mark, composed around 70, as a source, and both show a knowledge of the destruction of Jerusalem in 70 (Matthew 22:1–10 and Luke 19:43 and 21:20). These provide an earliest possible date for both gospels; for end-dates, the epistles of Ignatius of Antioch show a familiarity with the gospel of Matthew, and as Ignatius died during the reign of the Emperor Trajan (r. 98–117), Matthew cannot have been written later than this; and Acts, which scholars agree was written by the author of Luke, shows no awareness of the letters of Paul, which were circulating widely by the end of the 1st century. See Sim (2008), pp. 15–16, and Reddish (2011), pp. 144–145.) The scholarly consensus is that Matthew originated in a "Matthean community" in the city of Antioch, located in modern-day Turkey; Luke was written in a large city west of Judaea, for an educated Greek-speaking audience. Because Mark is the earliest gospel and was used by Matthew and Luke, the latter have has therefore often been seen as secondary, though this has recently been challenged. Luke and Matthew treat their sources more conservatively than other ancient historians like Diodorus Siculus, though the parallels and variations of the Synoptic gospels are typical of ancient historical biographies. Kloppenborg observes that Luke’s ways of editing Mark are comparable to that the methods used by Plutarch, including abridgements, chronological changes, and reordering events. Both used the gospel of Mark (606 of Matthew's verses are taken from Mark, 320 of Luke's).

=== Q, M, and L (Two-Source Hypothesis) ===
Mark has 661 verses, 637 of which are reproduced in Matthew and/or Luke. Matthew and Luke share a further 200 verses (roughly) which are not taken from Mark: the Two-source hypothesis considers this the Q source, though alternative hypotheses without Q are also growing. (Note: The existence of the Q source is a hypothesis linked to the most popular explanation of the synoptic problem; other explanations of that problem do away with the need for Q, but are less widely accepted. See Delbert Burkett, "Rethinking the Gospel Sources: The unity or plurality of Q" (Vol. 2), p. 1.) Q is usually dated about a decade earlier than Mark; while there is debate about its exact content, but there is general agreement about the passages that belong to it. It has no passion story and no resurrection, but Strecker suggests that its nucleus reaches back to the earliest Palestinian community and even the lifetime of Jesus. Burkett argues that Q originated in Galilee as a set of speeches relating to occasions such as covenant-renewal, commissions, prayers, and calling judgement on their enemies. In 1998, Powell wrote that most consider it to be among the oldest and most reliable material in the gospels. Joseph writes that during the "Golden Age of Q Studies", it was almost assumed that Q's layers, origins in Galilee, and a critical reconstruction could be ascertained, and that it provided a relatively reliable portrait of the historical Jesus. Much of this ended with Goodacre's Case Against Q, and many scholars today have come to doubt rather than defend Q.

The relevance of sources and criticism in gospel studies has lost much of its relevance in recent years, and support for the M and L source theories has largely faded from scholarship.

=== John ===
The Gospel of John is a late document and has been seen as containing little accurate history not found in the Synoptics. However, since the third quest, John's gospel is seen as having more reliability than previously thought or sometimes even more reliable than the Synoptics. John's gospel shows deep familiarity with mundane details such as the regions, distances between locations, the people, customs, Jewish practices, regional tensions, regional languages, details of crucifixion and there is archeological corroboration of numerous locations it mentions. About 85 percent of John's content is unique to John, with 92 percent of its material having no parallels in Mark, rendering the Gospel as an independent document about the life of Jesus and surrounding events. The narrator is presented as a witness in 1:14, and the gospel gradually identifies its writer as the Beloved Disciple in 19 and 21. Christian tradition identifies him as John the Apostle, but the majority of modern scholars have abandoned this or hold it only tenuously, though they view the beloved disciple as the source of much of John's content. (Note: For the circumstances which led to the tradition, and the reasons why the majority of modern scholars reject it, see Lindars, Edwards & Court 2000, pp. 41–42.) Most scholars believe it was written c. 90–100 AD, at Ephesus (although other possibilities are Antioch, Northern Syria, Judea and Alexandria). Scholars have increasingly described the gospel as a unitary text and abandoned models with hypothetical sources and a communal work written in multiple editions as synchronic readings predominate today, and there has been a decrease in arguing for the existence of hypothetical sources behind the Gospel of John in scholarship.

While John follows the format set by Mark, there are no identical passages; this was most probably the accepted shape for a gospel by the time John was written. John's discourses are full of synoptic-like material. During the twentieth century, John was considered independent of the Synoptics, but most scholars now accept the Synoptics as sources for John. John nevertheless differs from them:

| Synoptics | John |
|---|---|
| Begin with the virgin conception (virgin birth - Matthew and Luke only) | Begin with incarnation of the preexistent Logos/Word |
| Jesus visits Jerusalem only in the last week of his life; only one Passover | Jesus active in Judea for much of his mission; three Passovers |
| Jesus speaks little of himself | Jesus speaks much of himself, notably in the "I am" statements |
| Jesus calls for faith in God | Jesus calls for faith in himself |
| Jesus's central theme is the Kingdom of God | Jesus rarely mentions the Kingdom of God |
| Jesus preaches repentance and forgiveness | Jesus never mentions repentance, and mentions forgiveness only once (John 20:23) |
| Jesus speaks in aphorisms and parables | Jesus speaks in lengthy dialogues |
| Jesus rarely mentions eternal life | Jesus regularly mentions eternal life |
| Jesus shows strong concern for the poor and sinners | Jesus shows little concern for the poor and sinners |
| Jesus frequently exorcises demons | Jesus never exorcises demons |

== Texts ==
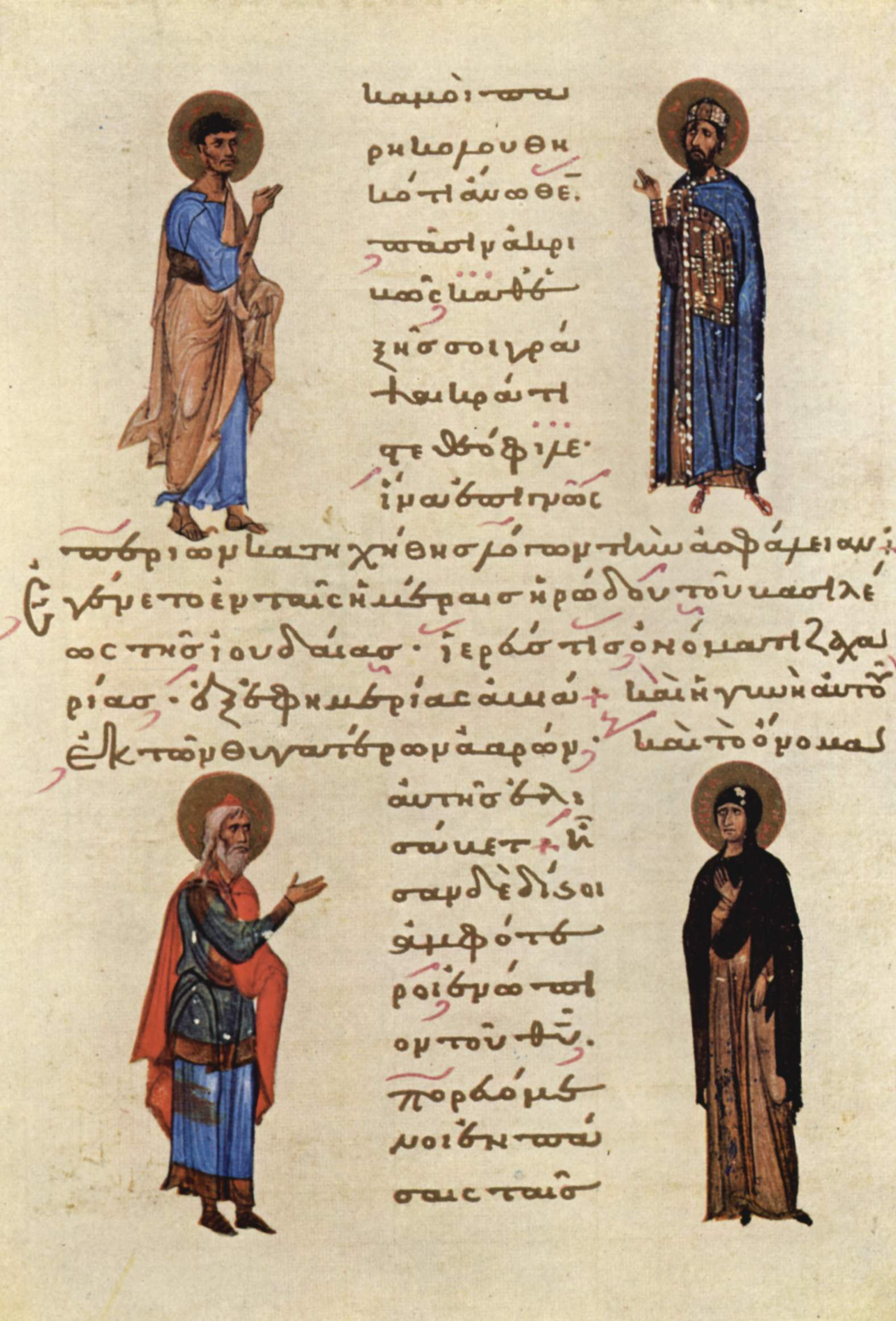
An 11th-century Byzantine manuscript containing the opening of the Gospel of Luke

Textual criticism resolves questions arising from the variations between texts: put another way, it seeks to decide the most reliable wording of a text. Ancient scribes made errors or alterations (such as including non-authentic additions). In attempting to determine the original text of the New Testament books, some modern textual critics have identified sections as additions of material, centuries after the gospel was written. These are called interpolations. In modern translations of the Bible, the results of textual criticism have led to certain verses, words and phrases being left out or marked as not original.

For example, there are a number of Bible verses in the New Testament that are present in the King James Version (KJV) but are absent from most modern Bible translations. Most modern textual scholars consider these verses interpolations (exceptions include advocates of the Byzantine or Majority text). The verse numbers have been reserved, but without any text, so as to preserve the traditional numbering of the remaining verses. The biblical scholar Bart D. Ehrman notes that many current verses were not part of the original text of the New Testament. "These scribal additions are often found in late medieval manuscripts of the New Testament, but not in the manuscripts of the earlier centuries", he adds. "And because the King James Bible is based on later manuscripts, such verses "became part of the Bible tradition in English-speaking lands"." He notes, however, that modern English translations, such as the New International Version, were written by using a more appropriate textual method.

Most modern Bibles have footnotes to indicate passages that have disputed source documents. Bible Commentaries also discuss these, sometimes in great detail. While many variations have been discovered between early copies of biblical texts, most of these are variations in spelling, punctuation, or grammar. Also, many of these variants are so particular to the Greek language that they would not appear in translations into other languages. Three of the most important interpolations are the last verses of the Gospel of Mark the story of the adulterous woman in the Gospel of John, and the explicit reference to the Trinity in 1 John to have been a later addition.

The New Testament has been preserved in more than 5,800 fragmentary Greek manuscripts, 10,000 Latin manuscripts and 9,300 manuscripts in various other ancient languages including Syriac, Slavic, Ethiopic and Armenian. Not all biblical manuscripts come from orthodox Christian writers. For example, the Gnostic writings of Valentinus come from the 2nd century AD, and these Christians were regarded as heretics by the mainstream church. The sheer number of witnesses presents unique difficulties, although it gives scholars a better idea of how close modern bibles are to the original versions. Bruce Metzger says, "The more often you have copies that agree with each other, especially if they emerge from different geographical areas, the more you can cross-check them to figure out what the original document was like. The only way they'd agree would be where they went back genealogically in a family tree that represents the descent of the manuscripts."

In The Text Of The New Testament, Kurt Aland and Barbara Aland compare the total number of variant-free verses, and the number of variants per page (excluding spelling errors), among the seven major editions of the Greek NT (Tischendorf, Westcott-Hort, von Soden, Vogels, Merk, Bover and Nestle-Aland), concluding that 62.9%, or 4,999/7,947, are in agreement. They concluded, "Thus in nearly two-thirds of the New Testament text, the seven editions of the Greek New Testament which we have reviewed are in complete accord, with no differences other than in orthographical details (e.g., the spelling of names). Verses in which any one of the seven editions differs by a single word are not counted. ... In the Gospels, Acts, and Revelation the agreement is less, while in the letters it is much greater." Per Aland and Aland, the total consistency achieved in the Gospel of Matthew was 60% (642 verses out of 1,071), the total consistency achieved in the Gospel of Mark was 45% (306 verses out of 678), the total consistency achieved in the Gospel of Luke was 57% (658 verses out of 1,151), and the total consistency achieved in the Gospel of John was 52% (450 verses out of 869). Almost all of these variants are minor, and most of them are spelling or grammatical errors. Almost all can be explained by some type of unintentional scribal mistake, such as poor eyesight. Very few variants are contested among scholars, and few or none of the contested variants carry any theological significance. Modern biblical translations reflect this scholarly consensus where the variants exist, while the disputed variants are typically noted as such in the translations.

A quantitative study on the stability of the New Testament compared early manuscripts to later manuscripts, up to the Middle Ages, with the Byzantine manuscripts, and concluded that the text had more than 90% stability over this time period. It has been estimated that only 0.1% to 0.2% of the New Testament variants impact the meaning of the texts in any significant fashion.

Bart Ehrman, when contrasting his view with his mentor Bruce M. Metzger, stated that "The position I argue for in Misquoting Jesus does not actually stand at odds with Prof. Metzger’s position that the essential Christian beliefs are not affected by textual variants in the manuscript tradition of the New Testament" and notes that "[m]ost textual variants (Prof. Metzger and I agree on this) have no bearing at all on what a passage means". In another work on textual criticism, Ehrman and Metzger state that even if we did not have any New testament manuscripts, the entire New Testament could be restored from the extensive quotations by the early Church fathers.

Daniel B. Wallace, and other textual critics have provided details and examples of textual variants, how they are reconstructed properly based on rigorous methods and lines of evidence, and dispelled modern myths of irrecuperable corruptions or lost information. Such investigations have concluded that the New Testament text is well preserved, while correcting diverse claims on textual criticism.

== Individual units ==
The Synoptic gospels follow Mark closely compared to other ancient historians’ usage of sources, while John’s relatively free usage of Mark lines up well with the practices of other authors during antiquity but contrasts with the unusually conservative adaptations of the Synoptics. Brown contends for important contradictions between the gospels, though Allison notes that most variations in the Synoptics are relatively minor. The patterns of parallels and differences found in the gospels are typical of ancient biographies about real people and history.

=== Early Life of Jesus ===
The genealogy, birth and childhood of Jesus appear only in Matthew and Luke. Critical scholars such as W. D. Davies and E. P. Sanders consider both, such as Luke’s census of Quirinius, to be non-historical, (Note: Many biblical scholars view the discussion of historicity as secondary, given that gospels were primarily written as theological documents rather than historical accounts.) though they contain some useful biographical information concerning Jesus's birth during the reign of Augustus and his father's name. Conservative scholars have maintained the historicity of the narratives.

The Gospel of Matthew and Luke give differing genealogies of Jesus. Some have suggested that the differences are the result of different lineages, Matthew's from King David's son, Solomon, to Jacob, father of Joseph, and Luke's from King David's other son, Nathan, to Heli, father of Mary and father-in-law of Joseph. Geza Vermes argues that Luke makes no mention of Mary, and questions what purpose a maternal genealogy would serve in a Jewish setting.

=== Baptism of Jesus ===
Modern biblical scholars view the baptism of Jesus as a historical event to which a high degree of certainty can be assigned.

=== Teachings of Jesus ===
Most scholars have accepted the parables of Jesus as authentically dominical. John P. Meier argues that most parables are marked by the theology of Matthew and Luke and that few of the parables can be attributed with confidence to the historical Jesus, although other scholars disagree. Dale Allison professes to be slower than Meier to move from redactional features to complete invention and suggests that most of Luke’s parables do not derive from redaction.

=== Cleansing of the Temple ===
According to Sanders most scholars agree that it is "overwhelmingly probable that Jesus did something in the temple and said something about its destruction".

=== Passion narrative ===
The entry of Jesus into Jerusalem recalls the entry of Judas Maccabeus; the Last Supper is mentioned only in the synoptics. There is a general agreement among scholars that Jesus did enter Jerusalem and was acclaimed by his supporters.

While Christian tradition reflects a tendency to shift responsibility for Jesus’ execution away from Roman authorities and toward Jewish leaders, both Jewish and Roman figures appear to have been involved in the Crucifixion of Jesus; Paul in the First Epistle to the Thessalonians claims the Judeans were responsible for the death of Jesus, while he mentions the Roman authorities in the First Epistle to the Corinthians, agreeing with the Gospel accounts where Jesus’s death follows the Sanhedrin and Pilate’s actions. Gerd Lüdemann argues that such theological and missionary motivations raise questions about the historicity of the Gospel accounts at this point in the narrative.

=== Last Supper ===
According to John P. Meier and E. P. Sanders, Jesus having a final meal with his disciples is almost beyond dispute among scholars, and belongs to the framework of the narrative of Jesus' life. I. Howard Marshall states that any doubt about the historicity of the Last Supper should be abandoned.

=== Crucifixion ===
Scholars nearly universally accept the historicity of Jesus' crucifixion, although there is no consensus on the details. Sanders and Fredriksen support the historicity of the crucifixion, but contend that Jesus’s prediction of the crucifixion is a "church creation". On the other hand, Michael Patrick Barber and Dale Allison argue that the historical Jesus predicted his violent death. The account of Judas’s death in Acts, where Judas buys a field and dies there, differs from the one in Matthew, where he gives the bribe to the temple priests who buy the field instead.

== Archaeology and geography ==
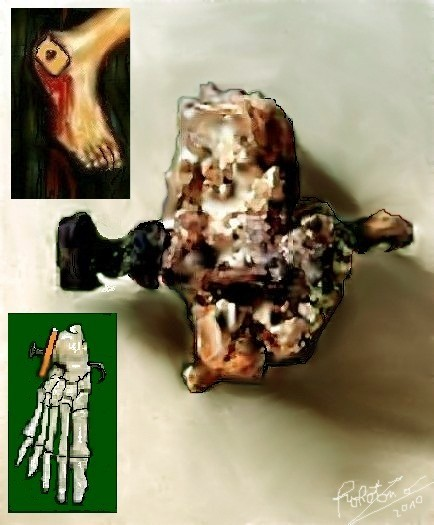
Skeletal remains of Jehohanan, 1st-century CE crucifixion victim from Givat HaMivtar in Jerusalem, with a nail still lodged inside the heel bone

Archaeological tools are very limited with respect to questions of existence of any specific individuals from the ancient past. According to Eric Cline, there is no direct archaeological evidence for the majority of people in antiquity, including people like Jesus or apostles. Bart Ehrman states that having no archeological evidence is not an argument for the non-existence of Jesus or anyone else because we have no archaeological evidence from anyone else from Jesus's day either. Even still, either archaeological record or extra-biblical attestations do exist for numerous people found in the New Testament, including Jesus. Craig Evans notes that archaeologists have some indirect information on how Jesus' life might have been from archaeological finds from Nazareth, the High Priest Caiaphas' ossuary, numerous synagogue buildings, and Jehohanan, a crucified victim who had a Jewish burial after execution. Archeological findings from Nazareth refute claims by mythicists that Nazareth did not exist in the 1st century and also give credibility to brief passages in the Gospels on Jesus' time in Nazareth, his father's trade, and connection to places in Judea. Archaeologists have uncovered a site in Capernaum which is traditionally believed, based on tentative circumstantial evidence, to have been the House of Peter, and which may thus possibly have housed Jesus. Some of the places mentioned in the gospels have been verified by archaeological evidence, such as the Pool of Bethesda, the Pool of Siloam, and the Temple Mount platform extension by King Herod. A mosaic from a third-century church in Megiddo mentions Jesus. The gospel of John has seen increasing archeological corroboration of some its mundane details and some of the most important discoveries in the last few decades have been related to this gospel. A geological study based on sediments near the Dead Sea indicate that an earthquake occurred around 31 AD ± 5 years, which plausibly coincides with the earthquake reported by Matthew 27 near the time of the crucifixion of Christ. A statistical study of name frequency in the Gospels and Acts corresponded well with a population name distribution database from 330 BC - 200 AD and the works of Josephus, and did not fit well with ancient fictional works; supporting historicity broadly.

== See also ==
- Authority – Reliability of a text as a witness
- Bible version debate – Debate concerning the proper Bible version to use
- Biblical manuscript – Handwritten copy of a portion of the Bible
- Christ myth theory – Fringe theory claiming that Jesus did not exist
- Criticism of the Bible
- Development of the New Testament canon
- Gospel harmony – Compiling events of the biblical gospels
- Jesus in comparative mythology – Comparative mythology study of Jesus
- Jesus Seminar – American biblical research project
- Life of Jesus – Part of the New Testament
- New Testament apocrypha – Writings by early Christians, not included in the Biblical Canon
- Scholarly interpretation of Gospel elements
