= Q+/Papias hypothesis =

Hypothesis about the synoptic gospels

Q/Papias hypothesis

Theory Information
- Order: Logoi; Mark; Matt; Papias; Luke
- Additional Sources: Logoi, Papias

Gospels' Sources
- Matthew: Logoi, Mark
- Mark: Logoi
- Luke: Logoi, Mark, Matt, Papias

Theory History
- Originator: Dennis R. MacDonald
- Originating Work: Two Shipwrecked Gospels: The "Logoi of Jesus" and Papias's "Exposition of the Logia about the Lord."
- Origination Date: 2012

The Q+/Papias hypothesis (Q+/PapH), advanced by Dennis R. MacDonald, offers an alternative solution to the synoptic problem. MacDonald prefers to call this expanded version of Q Logoi of Jesus, which is supposed to have been its original title.

The Q+/PapH has similarities to previous solutions to the synoptic problem. Like the two-source hypothesis, the Q+/PapH affirms that both Matthew and Luke have used a Q document. Like the Farrer hypothesis, it affirms that Matthew used Mark and that Luke used both Mark and Matthew. Like the modified two-document hypothesis, it affirms that Mark also used the Q document.

== Reconstructing the Logoi of Jesus (Q+) ==
=== Primitivity ===
When two or more texts contain parallel content, the Q+/Papias hypothesis uses the following criteria to determine which version is more primitive:

- An independent version is more primitive than one within a narrative context
- A unified version is more primitive than one that appears in multiple contexts
- When a saying relies on a biblical text, a version which is closer to the antecedent text is more primitive than one which obfuscates the relationship
- A version that exhibits awkwardness is more primitive than one that seems to have been improved
- A version that is pithy and balanced is more primitive than one containing explications
- A version exhibiting the redactional qualities of its host text is less primitive than one that is atypical within its host text

When the decision of primitivity alternates between different texts (instead of one text always exhibiting a more primitive version), this situation allows for the possibility that the texts in question must have used another, earlier document. In the case of the Synoptics, the Q+/PapH suggests that this earlier text is the Logoi of Jesus (Q+).

=== Matthew's Minimal Q (MQ−) ===
In order to reconstruct the Logoi of Jesus (Q+), the Q+/Papias hypothesis begins by establishing a minimal version of Q used by Matthew (MQ−). MQ− can be reconstructed by reference to only Matthew and Mark because of two considerations:

- Matthew contains a number of doublets (two tellings of the same story) which is presumably the result of Matthew taking one from Q and one from Mark. Sometimes the version Matthew takes from Q meets the criteria for primitivity against Mark's and appear to have even served as a source for Mark's version.
- There exist non-doublets in Matthew (instances where Matthew could have included Mark's account but does not do so, presumably because Matthew found the non-Markan version preferable and sufficient).

The cases of inverted priority—that is, when the content of a latter Gospel (Matthew) is deemed to be more primitive than the content of an earlier Gospel (Mark)—are the impetus for believing that Matthew and Mark used a Q document.

=== Matthew's Expanded Q (MQ+) ===
The next step according to the Q+/Papias hypothesis is to expand Matthew's Q (MQ+). According to MacDonald, "There is no reason to think that Matthew relied on a second source only in these cases of doublets and nondoublets."

The three types of logia used to expand MQ− into MQ+ are:

1. Logia in Matthew that are deemed to be more primitive than the corresponding logia in Mark
2. Logia in Matthew that may reflect the material upon which Mark has performed a secondary redaction
3. Logia that appear in Matthew but not in Mark

The Q+/PapH uses four criteria to determine whether a logion should be included in MQ+:

- Criterion A – Inverted Priority: The logion in Matthew exhibits a more primitive quality than the corresponding logion in Mark. This criterion can be applied in the cases of the first two types of logia.
- Criterion B – Evidence of Tradition: The logion in Matthew exhibits evidence that Matthew inherited it.
- Criterion C – Congruence with Minimal MQ: The logion in Matthew coheres with other logia identified as belonging to Matthew's pre-Markan source via Criterion A.
- Criterion D – Explanation for Mark's Omission or Transformation: The logion is preserved by Matthew which the interpreter can posit a plausible explanation for why Mark omitted or "radically transformed" it if he would have seen it in Q.

=== The Logoi of Jesus (Q+) ===
The final step in reconstructing the Logoi of Jesus (Q+) is to bring Luke's Gospel into consideration and to put the logia in order.

The same four criteria used to construct MQ+ are again used for logia from Luke's Gospel (and some from the Acts of the Apostles), with Criterion A, inverted priority, being most pertinent.

MacDonald introduces six new criteria for establishing the order of the Logoi of Jesus:

- Criterion 1: If all three Synoptic Gospels preserve the same order for certain logia, then it is wisest to follow this order as well.
- Criterion 2: If a logion appears in only one Gospel, its location should be determined relative to the other content from the Logoi of Jesus in that Gospel.
- Criterion 3: If logia shared by Matthew and Luke, but not Mark, agree in sequence, and if the Lukan versions exhibit inverted priority to the Matthean version, then this sequence is to be preferred.
- Criterion 4: If two or more logia are "indebted to a biblical antecedent," referring to the biblical text being used may suggest the appropriate order.
- Criterion 5: If different Gospels present logia in different orders, the interpreter should consider the Evangelists' literary tendencies and prefer the order that "displays the least redactional dislocation."
- Criterion 6: If different Gospels present logia in different orders, the interpreter should also prefer the order that makes the most sense within the sequence of other material attributed to the Logoi of Jesus.

MacDonald writes, "I confess to an aesthetic prejudice: the lost Gospel was coherent and resembled other ancient books, unlike the textual reconstructions of Q offered in CEQ or Fleddermann, which are fragmentary, often incoherent, and literarily sui generis."

Whereas most previous attempts at reconstructing Q use the chapter-verse numbering from Luke's Gospel, MacDonald's reconstruction introduces a new numbering system: three hundred eighty-nine verses comprising ten chapters.

== The Logoi of Jesus and Deuteronomy ==
As reconstructed by MacDonald, the Logoi of Jesus appears to have been structured as a rewriting, or imitation, of Deuteronomy. The title, Logoi of Jesus, itself evokes Deuteronomy 1:1 (lxx), "These are the logoi that Moses spoke..." MacDonald summarizes, "the Logoi of Jesus was not a loose assortment of traditional sayings clumsily gathered into speeches: it was a strategic rewriting of Deuteronomy with a coherent and compelling structure and plot. To be sure, it is not a narrative such as one finds in the Synoptics, but it is a narrative nonetheless."

== Mark and Q ==
Like the Modified Two-Document Hypothesis, the Q+/Papias hypothesis holds that Mark used the Q document in composing his Gospel. This is unorthodox because scholars of the synoptic problem have generalized Q as consisting of the overlapping material in Matthew and Luke minus the content they both share with Mark.

== The significance of Papias ==
After constructing a Q+ document, MacDonald turns his attention to the second-century CE Christian writer Papias of Hierapolis. In some of the few fragments of his writings that remain, Papias attempts to solve the synoptic problem. He knew of the Gospel of Mark and what he understood to be two translations of the Gospel of Matthew into Greek (from a Hebrew original). MacDonald suggests that the texts Papias in fact had were Matthew's Gospel and the Logoi of Jesus, which could easily be confused as an abridged version of Matthew.

== Implications for the historical Jesus ==
One of the most critical criteria for establishing the historical Jesus is the criterion of multiple attestation, that is, the description or saying of Jesus is attested in multiple, independent sources. For instance, in John Meier's work, A Marginal Jew: Rethinking the Historical Jesus, Meier identifies four independent sources for reconstructing the historical Jesus within the New Testament: Q, Mark, Paul, and John. Historical Jesus scholars using the four-source hypothesis have even more independent sources at their disposal; in addition to Q, Mark, Paul, and John, they have the M source and the L source. Some scholars also include Agrapha and Apocryphal gospels, such as the Gospel of Thomas. (Most scholars consider these to be dependent upon the Canonical gospels).

The Q+/Papias hypothesis, on the other hand, dramatically reduces the number of independent sources. Q and Mark are not independent sources for the Historical Jesus because the Q+/PapH claims that Mark used Q. John also cannot be a source of independent attestation because the Q+/PapH holds that John redacted Mark and/or Luke. By MacDonald's assessment, the Q+/PapH leaves scholars with only two independent sources for reconstructing the Historical Jesus: the Logoi of Jesus (Q+) and the undisputed Pauline epistles.

== Scholarly reception ==
Early reception of MacDonald's Q+/Papias hypothesis has been positive. While the initial reviewers have been cautious about categorically embracing the Q+/PapH, they agree that MacDonald's contribution advances the debate about the synoptic problem. John Kloppenborg, one of the editors of the Critical Edition of Q, offers the following review, "In spite of various methodological problems, there is no doubt that MacDonald's Two Shipwrecked Gospels is worth careful scrutiny and should provoke some reassessment of the extent of Q." Another reviewer, James F. McGrath, writes, "MacDonald offers a possible way of preserving what is strongest in the current competing paradigms, while also identifying their weaknesses, and finding a third option that may prove satisfactory to proponents of both. Consequently, future research into the synoptic problem cannot afford to take for granted another paradigm without at least engaging the proposal MacDonald offers."

The Q Section of the Society of Biblical Literature used MacDonald's book as a starting point for one of its sessions at the 2013 Annual Meeting in Baltimore, Maryland.

== See also ==
- Marcan priority
- Two-source hypothesis
- Three-source hypothesis
- Common Sayings Source
