= Source hypothesis =

Source hypothesis can refer to:

- Documentary hypothesis, for the Pentateuch of the Hebrew Bible
- Two-source hypothesis, for the Synoptic Gospels of the Greek New Testament
- Three-source hypothesis, for the Synoptic Gospels of the Greek New Testament
- Four-document hypothesis, for the Synoptic Gospels of the Greek New Testament
