= Multi-source hypothesis =

Proposed solution to the synoptic problem

Theory Information
- Order: Proto, Q A, B Matt, Mark, Luke
- Additional Sources: Q-source, Proto, A, B

Gospels' Sources
- Matthew: A, Q
- Mark: A, B
- Luke: B, Q

Theory History
- Originator: Herbert Marsh
- Proponents: Marie-Émile Boismard, Philippe Rolland, Delbert Burkett

The Multi-source hypothesis is a proposed solution to the synoptic problem, holding that Matthew, Mark, and Luke are not directly interdependent but have each drawn from a distinct combination of earlier documents. It encompasses a family of theories differing in the particulars of the nature and relationships of these earlier documents.

An early form of the theory was proposed by Herbert Marsh over two centuries ago. More recently, Marie-Émile Boismard proposed a structurally similar theory, which was further developed by Philippe Rolland and Delbert Burkett. Alan Kirk and Christopher Skinner have critiqued Burkett’s model for the Synoptic Problem.

According to these theories, the common material among the three synoptic gospels ultimately derives from a proto-gospel somewhat like Mark. This proto-gospel underwent two independent revisions, A and B. Mark was formed by recombining these two revisions. Matthew built upon A and Luke upon B. Both Matthew and Luke also drew from a common source Q, as well as other sources for their unique material.

== See also ==
- Two-source hypothesis
- Source criticism
