= Matthean Posteriority hypothesis =

Proposed solution to the synoptic problem

- Wilke hypothesis

Theory Information
- Order: Marcan priority Luke; Matt
- Additional Sources: No additional sources

Gospels' Sources
- Matthew: Mark, Luke
- Luke: Mark

Theory History
- Originator: Gottlob Christian Storr
- Origination Date: 1786
- Proponents: Christian Gottlob Wilke, Karl Kautsky

The Matthean Posteriority hypothesis, also known as the Wilke hypothesis after Christian Gottlob Wilke, is a proposed solution to the synoptic problem, holding that the Gospel of Mark was used as a source by the Gospel of Luke, then both of these were used as sources by the Gospel of Matthew. Thus, it posits Marcan priority and Matthaean posteriority.

Wilke's hypothesis received little attention until recent decades, but a resurgence of support for Matthean Posteriority has been one of the defining trends of Synoptic studies during the 2010s, and the theory has entered the mainstream of scholarship.

== History ==
Gottlob Christian Storr, in his 1786 argument for Marcan priority, asked, if Mark was a source for Matthew and Luke, how the latter two were then related. Storr proposed, among other possibilities, that the canonical Matthew (written in Greek) was translated from the original, which was written in either Hebrew or Aramaic (the logia spoken of by Papias) by following Mark primarily but also drawing from Luke, although he later went on to oppose this.

These ideas were little noticed until 1838, when Christian Gottlob Wilke revived the hypothesis of Marcan priority and extensively developed the argument for Matthaean posteriority. Wilke's contemporary Christian Hermann Weisse at the same time independently argued for Marcan priority but for Matthew and Luke independently using Mark and another source Q—the two-source hypothesis. A few other German scholars supported Wilke's hypothesis in the nineteenth century, but in time most came to accept the two-source hypothesis, which remains the dominant theory to this day. Wilke's hypothesis was accepted by Karl Kautsky in his Foundations of Christianity.

Wilke's hypothesis received little further attention until recent decades, when it was revived in 1992 by Huggins, then Hengel, then independently by Blair. The resurgence of support for Matthean Posteriority is represented by the works of Alan Garrow, Evan Powell, and most importantly Robert MacEwen. The rise of the Matthaean posteriority hypothesis has been one of the defining trends of Synoptic studies during the 2010s, and the theory has entered the mainstream of scholarship.

== Evidence ==
Most arguments for the Wilke hypothesis follow those of the Farrer hypothesis in accepting Marcan priority but rejecting Q. The difference, then, is in the direction of dependence between Matthew and Luke.

Arguments advanced in favor of Matthaean posteriority include:

- Matthew's version of the double tradition appears more developed in wording and structure than Luke's, which appears more primitive. (The same observation is made by supporters of the two-source hypothesis, who regard Luke adhering better to the original Q.)
- Matthew contains passages that are conflations of elements drawn from Mark and Luke (e.g. Matt 9:14–17, 9:35–10, 12:22–30, 12:31–32, 19:23–30, 24:23–28). This phenomenon is unique to Matthew, for there is no similar array of passages in Luke that are composed of elements drawn from Mark and Matthew.
- Matthew seems to have deliberately rearranged his sources to collecting teachings into five large blocks (e.g., the Sermon on the Mount), which makes better sense than Luke rearranging Matthew into scattered fragments.
- In the double tradition, Matthew's language often retains characteristically Lucan features.
- The frequent occurrence of doublets in Matthew may indicate drawing from similar accounts in two different sources.

== See also ==
- Two-source hypothesis
- Farrer hypothesis
- Three-source hypothesis
- Four-document hypothesis
