= M source =

Hypothetical source for Matthew's Gospel

Streeter's four-document hypothesis

M source, which is sometimes referred to as M document, or simply M, comes from the M in "Matthean material". It is a hypothetical textual source for the Gospel of Matthew. M Source is defined as that "special material" of the Gospel of Matthew that is neither Q source nor Mark. With the decline of source criticism the existence of a unified M source is largely rejected in scholarship today.

== History ==
Nineteenth century New Testament scholars who rejected the traditional perspective of the priority of Matthew in favor of Marcan priority speculated that the authors of Matthew and Luke drew the material they have in common with the Gospel of Mark from that Gospel. Matthew and Luke, however, also share large sections of text which are not found in Mark. They suggested that neither Gospel drew upon the other, but upon a second common source, termed the Q. This two-source hypothesis speculates that Matthew borrowed from both Mark and a hypothetical sayings collection, called Q. For most scholars, the Q collection accounts for what Matthew and Luke share – sometimes in exactly the same words – but are not found in Mark. Examples of such material are the Devil's three temptations of Jesus, the Beatitudes, the Lord's Prayer and many individual sayings.

In The Four Gospels: A Study of Origins (1924), Burnett Hillman Streeter argued that a third source, referred to as M and also hypothetical, lies behind the material in Matthew that has no parallel in Mark or Luke. This four-source hypothesis posits that there were at least four sources to the Gospel of Matthew and the Gospel of Luke: the Gospel of Mark, and three lost sources: Q, M, and L. (M material is represented by violet in the above chart.) Throughout the remainder of the 20th century, there were various challenges and refinements of Streeter's hypothesis. For example, in his 1953 book The Gospel Before Mark, Pierson Parker posited an early version of Matthew (Aram. M or proto-Matthew) as the primary source. Parker argued that it was not possible to separate Streeter's "M" material from the material in Matthew parallel to Mark.

With the decline of source criticism the existence of a unified M source is largely rejected in scholarship today.

== Composition ==
=== Synoptic Gospels and the Nature of M ===
The relationship among the three synoptic gospels goes beyond mere similarity in viewpoint. The gospels often recount the same stories, usually in the same order, sometimes using the same words. Scholars note that the similarities between Mark, Matthew, and Luke are too great to be accounted for by mere coincidence. If the four-source hypothesis is correct, then M would probably have been a written document and contained the following:

Likely content of M Source
Parable	Chapter	Verses	Number of verses
Parable of the Tares	13	13:24–43	20
Parable of the Hidden Treasure	13	13:44	1
Parable of the Pearl	13	13:45–46	2
Parable of Drawing in the Net	13	13:47–52	6
Parable of the Unforgiving Servant	18	18:21–35	15
Parable of the Workers in the Vineyard	20	20:1–16	17
Parable of the Two Sons	21	21:28–32	5
Parable of the Ten Virgins	25	25:1–13	14

==== M source (30–50) ====
The third primary source is M. The study of pre-Gospel sources is declining in scholarship, with the tendency most visible with the M and L sources.

== See also ==
- Jewish-Christian Gospels
- Four-document hypothesis
- Common Sayings Source
- List of Gospels
