= Synoptic Gospels =

Gospels of Matthew, Mark, and Luke

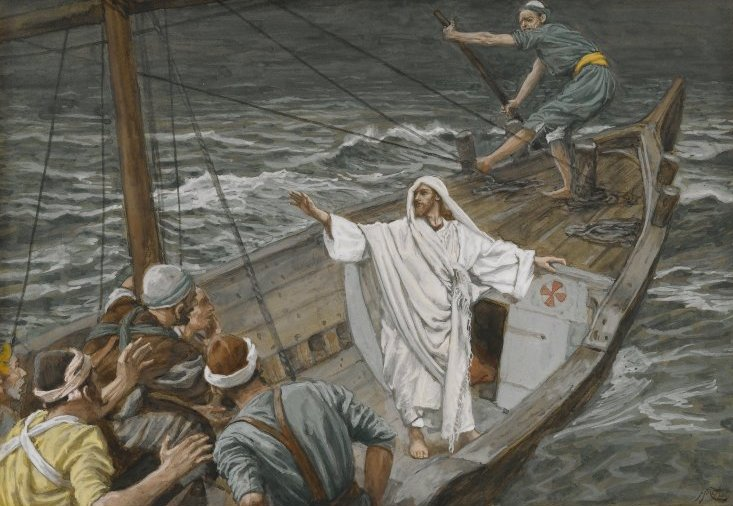
The calming of the storm is recounted in each of the three synoptic gospels, but not in John.

The gospels of Matthew, Mark, and Luke are referred to as the synoptic Gospels because they include many of the same stories, often in a similar sequence and in similar or sometimes identical wording. They stand in contrast to John, whose content is largely distinct. The term synoptic (Latin: synopticus; Greek: συνοπτικός, romanized: synoptikós) comes via Latin from the Greek σύνοψις, synopsis, i.e. "(a) seeing all together, synopsis". (Note: Both Greek words, synoptikos and synopsis, derive from σύν syn (prep.), meaning "together, with", and etymologically related words pertaining to sight, vision, appearance, i.e. ὀπτικός optikos (adj.; cf. English optic), meaning "of or for sight", and ὄψις opsis (n.), meaning "appearance, sight, vision, view".) The modern sense of the word in English is of "giving an account of the events from the same point of view or under the same general aspect". It is in this sense that it is applied to the synoptic gospels.

This strong parallelism among the three gospels in content, arrangement, and specific language is widely attributed to literary interdependence, though the role of orality and memorization of sources has also been explored by scholars. Scholarship starting around 2020 focuses on explaining the gospels' relationship in terms of ancient compositional practices and comparisons with other ancient historical biographers. The question of the precise nature of their relationship is a topic of ongoing debate, and no conclusive solution has been found yet. The majority view favors Marcan priority, in which both Matthew and Luke have made direct use of the Gospel of Mark as a source, and further holds that Matthew and Luke also drew from an additional hypothetical document, called Q, though alternative hypotheses that posit direct use of Matthew by Luke or vice versa without Q are increasing in popularity within scholarship.

== Structure ==
=== Common features ===
Common text between the synoptic gospels, as measured by A.M. Honoré

Broadly speaking, the synoptic gospels are similar to John: all are composed in Koine Greek, have a similar length, and were completed in less than a century after Jesus' death. They also differ from non-canonical sources, such as the Gospel of Thomas, in that they belong to the ancient genre of biography, collecting not only Jesus' teachings, but recounting in an orderly way his origins, ministry, Passion, miracles and Resurrection. The patterns of parallels and variations found in the gospels are typical of ancient biographies about real people and history. A. M. Honoré offers a statistical classification of the number of words in the single, double, and triple traditions. According to Robert H. Stein, "97.2 percent of the words in Mark have a parallel in Matthew, and 88.4 percent have a parallel in Luke".

In content and in wording, though, the synoptics diverge widely from John but have a great deal in common with each other. Though each gospel includes some unique material, the majority of Mark and roughly half of Matthew and Luke coincide in content, in much the same sequence, often nearly verbatim. This common material is termed the triple tradition.

=== Triple tradition ===
The triple tradition, the material included by all three synoptic gospels, includes many stories and teachings:

- John the Baptist
- Baptism and temptation of Jesus
- First disciples of Jesus
- Hometown rejection of Jesus
- Healing of Peter's mother-in-law, demoniacs, a leper, and a paralytic
- Call of the tax collector
- New Wine into Old Wineskins
- Man with withered hand
- Commissioning the Twelve Apostles
- The Beelzebul controversy
- Teachings on the parable of the strong man, eternal sin, His true relatives, the parable of the sower, the lamp under a bushel, and the parable of the mustard seed
- Calming the storm
- The Gerasene demoniac
- The daughter of Jairus and the bleeding woman
- Feeding the 5000
- Confession of Peter
- Transfiguration
- The demoniac boy
- The little children
- The rich young man
- Jesus predicts his death
- Blind near Jericho
- Palm Sunday
- Casting out the money changers
- Render unto Caesar
- Woes of the Pharisees
- Second Coming Prophecy
- The Last Supper, passion, crucifixion, and entombment
- The empty tomb and resurrected Jesus
- Great Commission

The triple tradition's pericopae (passages) tend to be arranged in much the same order in all three gospels. This stands in contrast to the material found in only two of the gospels, which is much more variable in order.

The classification of text as belonging to the triple tradition (or for that matter, double tradition) is not always definitive, depending rather on the degree of similarity demanded. Matthew and Mark report the cursing of the fig tree, a single incident, despite some substantial differences of wording and content. In Luke, the only parable of the barren fig tree is in a different point of the narrative. Some would say that Luke has extensively adapted an element of the triple tradition, while others would regard it as a distinct pericope.

==== Example ====
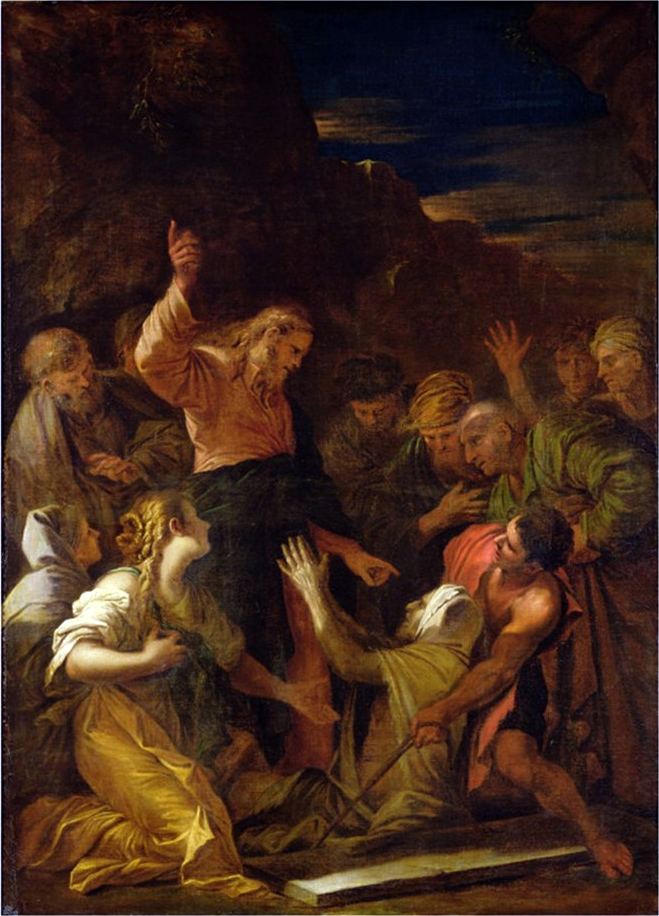
Christ cleansing a leper by Jean-Marie Melchior Doze, 1864

An illustrative example of the three texts in parallel is the healing of the leper:

Mt 8:2–3	Mk 1:40–42	Lk 5:12–13
Καὶ ἰδοὺ, λεπρὸς προσελθὼν προσεκύνει αὐτῷ λέγων· Κύριε, ἐὰν θέλῃς δύνασαί με καθαρίσαι. καὶ ἐκτείνας τὴν χεῖρα ἥψατο αὐτοῦ λέγων· Θέλω, καθαρίσθητι· καὶ εὐθέως ἐκαθαρίσθη αὐτοῦ ἡ λέπρα.	Καὶ ἔρχεται πρὸς αὐτὸν λεπρὸς παρακαλῶν αὐτὸν καὶ γονυπετῶν καὶ λέγων αὐτῷ ὅτι, Ἐὰν θέλῃς δύνασαί με καθαρίσαι. καὶ σπλαγχνισθεὶς ἐκτείνας τὴν χεῖρα αὐτοῦ ἥψατο καὶ λέγει αὐτῷ· Θέλω, καθαρίσθητι· καὶ εὐθὺς ἀπῆλθεν ἀπ᾿ αὐτοῦ ἡ λέπρα, καὶ ἐκαθαρίσθη.	Καὶ ἰδοὺ, ἀνὴρ πλήρης λέπρας· ἰδὼν δὲ τὸν Ἰησοῦν πεσὼν ἐπὶ πρόσωπον ἐδεήθη αὐτοῦ λέγων· Κύριε, ἐὰν θέλῃς δύνασαί με καθαρίσαι. καὶ ἐκτείνας τὴν χεῖρα ἥψατο αὐτοῦ λέγων· Θέλω, καθαρίσθητι· καὶ εὐθέως ἡ λέπρα ἀπῆλθεν ἀπ᾿ αὐτοῦ.
And behold, a leper came and worships him, saying: Lord, if you wish, I can be cleansed. And he stretched out his hand and touched him, saying: I wish it; be cleansed. And immediately his leprosy was cleansed.	And, calling out to him, there comes to him a leper and kneeling and saying to him: If you wish, I can be cleansed. And, moved with compassion, he stretched out his hand and touched him and says to him: I wish it; be cleansed. And immediately the leprosy left him, and he was cleansed.	And behold, a man full of leprosy. But, upon seeing Jesus, he fell upon his face and requested him, saying: Lord, if you wish, I can be cleansed. And he stretched out his hand and touched him, saying: I wish it; be cleansed. And immediately the leprosy left him.

More than half the wording in this passage is identical. Each gospel includes words absent in the other two and omits something included by the other two.

=== Relation to Mark ===
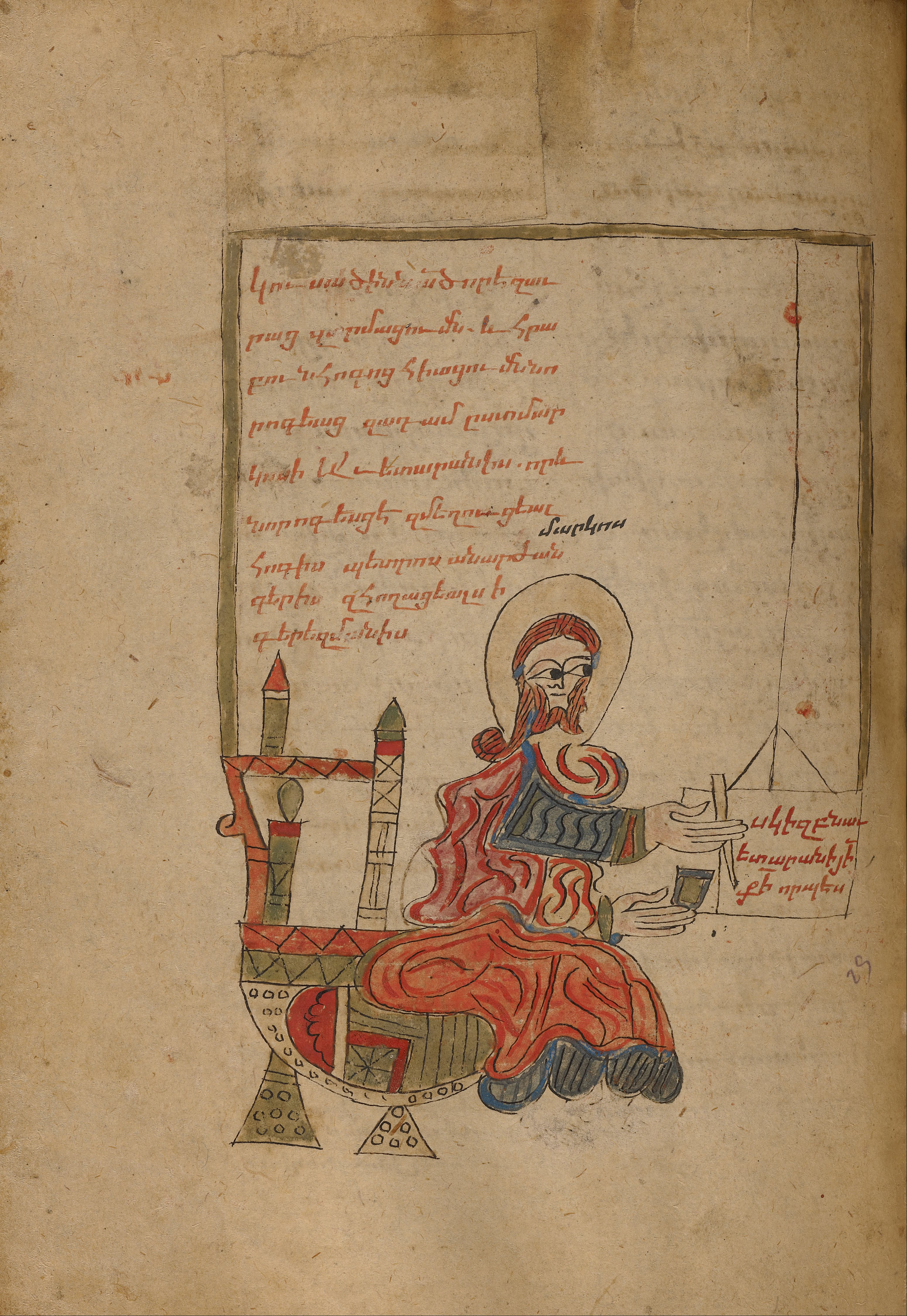
Mark writing his Gospel, from a medieval Armenian manuscript

The triple tradition itself constitutes a complete gospel quite similar to the shortest gospel, Mark.

Mark, unlike Matthew and Luke, adds little to the triple tradition. Pericopae unique to Mark are scarce, notably two healings involving saliva and the naked runaway. Mark's additions within the triple tradition tend to be explanatory elaborations (e.g., "the stone was rolled back, for it was very large") or Aramaisms (e.g., "Talitha kum!"). The pericopae Mark shares with only Luke are also quite few: the Capernaum exorcism and departure from Capernaum, the strange exorcist, and the widow's mites. A greater number, but still not many, are shared with only Matthew, most notably the so-called "Great Omission" from Luke of Mk 6:45–8:26.

Most scholars take these observations as a strong clue to the literary relationship among the synoptics and Mark's special place in that relationship, though various scholars suggest an entirely oral relationship or a dependence emphasizing memory and tradents in a tradition rather than simple copying. The Gospels represent a Jesus tradition and were enveloped by oral storytelling and performances during the early years of Christianity, rather than being redactions or literary responses to each other. The hypothesis favored by most experts is Marcan priority, whereby Mark was composed first, and Matthew and Luke each used Mark, incorporating much of it, with adaptations, into their own gospels. Alan Kirk praises Matthew in particular for his "scribal memory competence" and "his high esteem for and careful handling of both Mark and Q", which makes claims the latter two works are significantly different in terms of theology or historical reliability dubious. A leading alternative hypothesis is Marcan posteriority, with Mark having been formed primarily by extracting what Matthew and Luke shared in common.

=== Double tradition ===
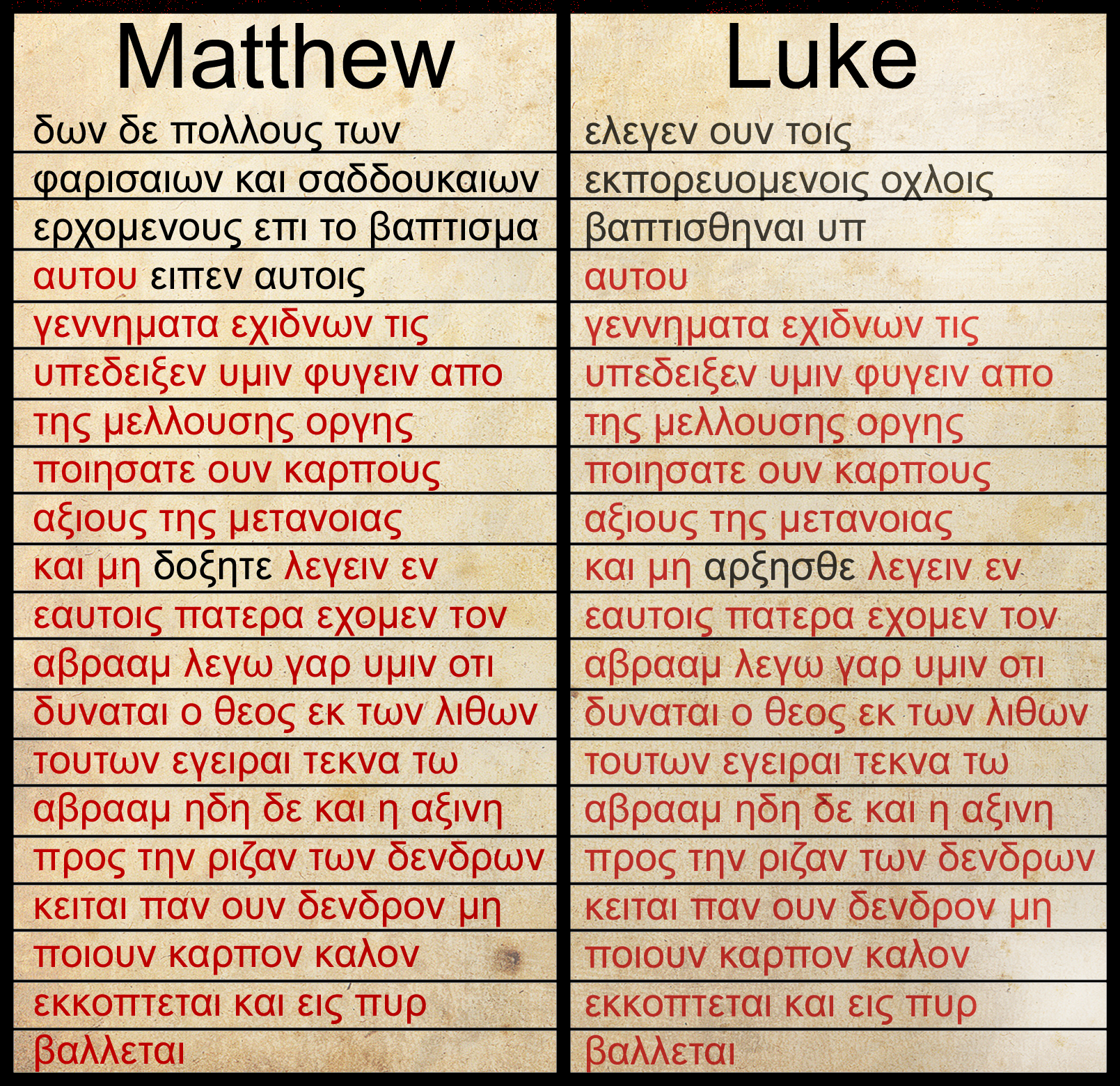
The preaching of John the Baptist in Matthew and Luke, with differences rendered in black. Here the two texts agree verbatim, with an isolated exception, for a span of over sixty words. Mark has no parallel.

An extensive set of material—some two hundred verses, or roughly half the length of the triple tradition—are the pericopae shared between Matthew and Luke, but absent in Mark. This is termed the double tradition. Parables and other sayings predominate in the double tradition, but also included are narrative elements:

- Preaching of John the Baptist
- Temptation of Jesus (which Mark summarizes in two verses)
- The Sermon on the Mount (Matthew) or Plain (Luke)
- The Centurion's servant
- Messengers from John the Baptist
- Woes to the unrepentant cities
- Jesus thanks his Father
- Return of the unclean spirit
- Parables of the leaven, the lost sheep, the great banquet, the talents, and the faithful servant
- Discourse against the scribes and Pharisees
- Lament over Jerusalem

Unlike triple tradition material, double tradition material is structured differently in the two gospels. Matthew's lengthy Sermon on the Mount, for example, is paralleled by Luke's shorter Sermon on the Plain, with the remainder of its content scattered throughout Luke. This is consistent with the general pattern of Matthew collecting sayings into large blocks, while Luke does the opposite and intersperses them with narrative.

Besides the double tradition proper, Matthew and Luke often agree against Mark within the triple tradition to varying extents, sometimes including several additional verses, sometimes differing by a single word. These are termed the major and minor agreements (the distinction is imprecise). One example is in the passion narrative, where Mark has simply, "Prophesy!" while Matthew and Luke both add, "Who is it that struck you?"

The double tradition's origin, with its major and minor agreements, is a key facet of the synoptic problem. The simplest hypothesis is Luke relied on Matthew's work or vice versa. But many experts, on various grounds, maintain that neither Matthew nor Luke used the other's work. If this is the case, they must have drawn from some common source, distinct from Mark, that provided the double-tradition material and overlapped with Mark's content where major agreements occur. This hypothetical document is termed Q, for the German Quelle, meaning "source".

=== Special Matthew and Special Luke ===
Matthew and Luke contain a large amount of material found in no other gospel. These materials are sometimes called "Special Matthew" or M and "Special Luke" or L.

Both Special Matthew and Special Luke include distinct opening infancy narratives and post-resurrection conclusions (with Luke continuing the story in his second book Acts). In between, Special Matthew includes mostly parables, while Special Luke includes both parables and healings.

Special Luke is notable for containing a greater concentration of Semitisms than any other gospel material.

Luke gives some indication of how he composed his gospel in his prologue:

Since many have undertaken to set down an orderly account of the events that have been fulfilled among us, just as they were handed on to us by those who from the beginning were eyewitnesses and servants of the word, I too decided, after investigating everything carefully from the very first, to write an orderly account for you, most excellent Theophilus, so that you may know the truth concerning the things about which you have been instructed.

== Synoptic problem ==
The texts of the three synoptic gospels often agree very closely in wording and order, both in quotations and in narration. Most scholars ascribe this to documentary dependence: the agreements among synoptic gospels are due to one gospel drawing from the text of another, or from some written source that another gospel also drew from. Recent scholarship tends to explain the gospels' relationship in terms of ancient compositional practices and comparisons with other ancient historical biographers over the traditional emphasis on theological agendas.

=== Controversies ===
The synoptic problem hinges on several interrelated points of controversy:

- Priority: Which gospel was written first? (If one text draws from another, the source must have been composed first.)
- Successive dependence: Did each of the synoptic gospels draw from each of its predecessors? (If not, the frequent agreements between the two independent gospels against the third must originate elsewhere.)
- Lost written sources: Did any of the gospels draw from some earlier document which has not been preserved (e.g., the hypothetical "Q", or from earlier editions of other gospels)?
- Oral sources: To what extent did each evangelist or literary collaborator draw from personal knowledge, eyewitness accounts, liturgy, or other oral traditions to produce an original written account?
- Translation: Jesus and others quoted in the gospels spoke primarily in Aramaic, but the gospels themselves in their oldest available form are each written in Koine Greek. Who performed the translations, and at what point?
- Redaction: How and why did those who put the gospels into their final form expand, abridge, alter, or rearrange their sources?

=== History ===
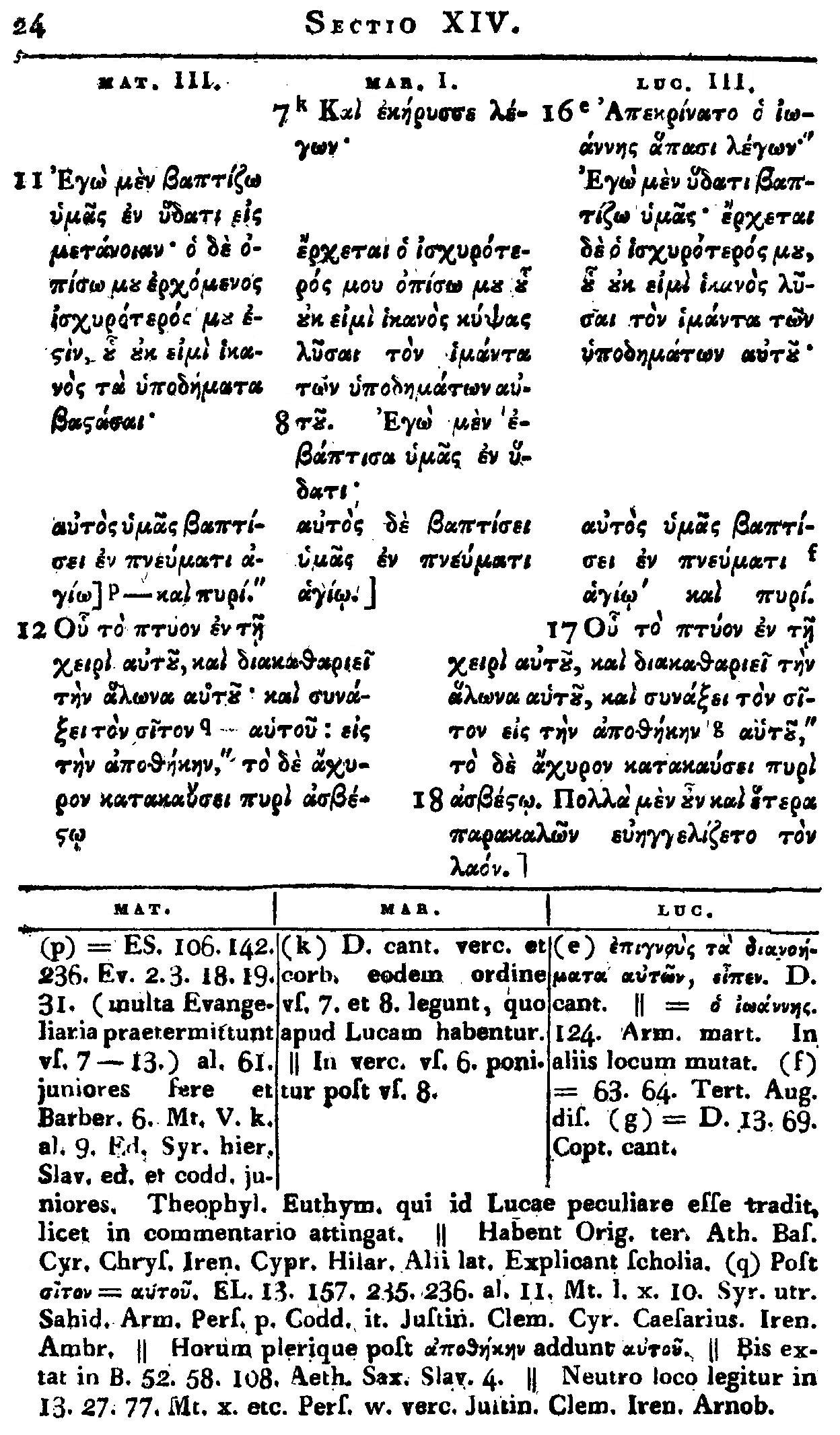
A page of Griesbach's Synopsis Evangeliorum, which presents the texts of the synoptic gospels arranged in columns

Ancient sources virtually unanimously ascribe the synoptic gospels to the apostle Matthew, to Mark, and to Luke—hence their respective canonical names. The ancient authors, however, did not agree on which order the Gospels had been written. For example, Clement of Alexandria held that Matthew wrote first, Luke wrote second and Mark wrote third; on the other hand, Origen argued that Matthew wrote first, Mark wrote second and Luke wrote third; Tertullian states that John and Matthew were published first and that Mark and Luke came later; and Irenaeus precedes all these and orders his famous 'four pillar story' by John, Luke, Matthew, and Mark.

A remark by Augustine of Hippo in his work Harmony of the Gospels at the beginning of the fifth century presents the gospels as composed in their canonical order (Matthew, Mark, Luke, John), with each evangelist thoughtfully building upon and supplementing the work of his predecessors—the Augustinian hypothesis (Matthew–Mark). Later in the same work, he revised his position, claiming that it was "more probable" that Luke came before Mark and Mark made use of both Matthew and Luke, an early version of the two-gospel hypothesis; his support of this position, however, has largely been forgotten.

The Augustinian Hypothesis (when any model of dependence was considered at all) seldom came into question until the late eighteenth century, when Johann Jakob Griesbach published in 1776 a synopsis of the synoptic gospels. Instead of harmonizing them, he displayed their texts side by side, making both similarities and divergences apparent. Griesbach, noticing the special place of Mark in the synopsis, hypothesized Marcan posteriority and advanced (as Henry Owen had a few years earlier) the two-gospel hypothesis (Matthew–Luke).

In the nineteenth century, researchers applied the tools of literary criticism to the synoptic problem in earnest, especially in German scholarship. Early work revolved around a hypothetical proto-gospel (Ur-Gospel), possibly in Aramaic, underlying the synoptics. From this line of inquiry, however, a consensus emerged that Mark itself served as the principal source for the other two gospels—Marcan priority.

In a theory first proposed by Christian Hermann Weisse in 1838, the double tradition was explained by Matthew and Luke independently using two sources—thus, the two-source (Mark–Q) theory—which supplemented Mark with another hypothetical source consisting mostly of sayings. This additional source was at first seen as the logia (sayings) spoken of by Papias and thus called "Λ", (Note: The capital form of the Greek letter lambda λ, corresponding to l, used here to abbreviate logia (Greek: λόγια).) but later it became more generally known as "Q", from the German Quelle, meaning source. This two-source theory eventually won wide acceptance and was seldom questioned until the late twentieth century; most scholars simply took this new orthodoxy for granted and directed their efforts toward Q itself, and this is still largely the case.

The theory is also well known in a more elaborate form set forth by Burnett Hillman Streeter in 1924, which additionally hypothesized written sources "M" and "L" (for "Special Matthew" and "Special Luke" respectively)—hence the influential four-document hypothesis. This exemplifies the prevailing scholarship of the time, which saw the canonical gospels as late products, dating from well into the second century, composed by unsophisticated cut-and-paste redactors out of a progression of written sources, and derived in turn from oral traditions and from folklore that had evolved in various communities.

In recent decades, weaknesses of the two-source theory have been more widely recognized, and debate has reignited. Many have independently argued that Luke did make some use of Matthew after all. British scholars went further and dispensed with Q entirely, ascribing the double tradition to Luke's direct use of Matthew—the Farrer hypothesis of 1955-which is enjoying growing popularity within scholarship today. The rise of the Matthaean posteriority hypothesis, which dispenses with Q but ascribes the double tradition to Matthew's direct use of Luke, has been one of the defining trends of Synoptic studies during the 2010s, and the theory has entered the mainstream of scholarship. Meanwhile, the Augustinian hypothesis has also made a comeback, especially in American scholarship. The Jerusalem school hypothesis has also attracted fresh advocates, as has the Independence hypothesis, which denies documentary relationships altogether.

On this collapse of consensus, Wenham observed: "I found myself in the Synoptic Problem Seminar of the Society for New Testament Studies, whose members were in disagreement over every aspect of the subject. When this international group disbanded in 1982 they had sadly to confess that after twelve years' work they had not reached a common mind on a single issue."

More recently, Andris Abakuks applied a statistical time series approach to the Greek texts to determine the relative likelihood of these proposals. Models without Q fit reasonably well. Matthew and Luke were statistically dependent on their borrowings from Mark. This suggests at least one of Matthew and Luke had access to the other's work. The most likely synoptic gospel to be the last was Luke. The least likely was Mark. While this weighs against the Griesbach proposal and favors the Farrer, he does not claim any proposals are ruled out.

=== Conclusions ===
No definitive solution to the Synoptic Problem has been found yet. The two-source hypothesis, which was dominant throughout the 20th century, still enjoys the support of most New Testament scholars; however, it has come under substantial attack since the end of the 20th century by a number of biblical scholars, who have attempted to relaunch the Augustinian hypothesis, the Griesbach hypothesis and the Farrer hypothesis.

In particular, the existence of the Q source has received strong criticism in the first two decades of the 21st century: scholars such as Mark Goodacre and Brant Pitre have pointed out that no manuscript of Q has ever been found, nor is any reference to Q ever made in the writings of the Church Fathers (or any ancient writings, in fact). This has prompted E. P. Sanders and Margaret Davies to write that the Two-sources hypothesis, while still dominant, "is least satisfactory" and Fr. Joseph Fitzmyer SJ to state that the Synoptic Problem is "practically insoluble".

=== Theories ===
Nearly every conceivable theory has been advanced as a solution to the synoptic problem. The most notable theories include:

Notable synoptic theories
Priority	Theory	Diagram	Notes
Marcan priority	Two‑source (Mark–Q)		Most widely accepted theory. Matthew and Luke independently used Q, taken to be a Greek document with sayings and narrative.
Marcan priority	Farrer (Mark–Matthew)		Double tradition explained entirely by Luke's use of Matthew.
Marcan priority	Three‑source (Mark–Q/Matthew)		A hybrid of Two-source and Farrer. Q may be limited to sayings, may be in Aramaic, and may also be a source for Mark.
Marcan priority	Wilke (Mark–Luke)		Double tradition explained entirely by Matthew's use of Luke.
Marcan priority	Four-source (Mark–Q/M/L)		Matthew and Luke used Q. Only Matthew used M and only Luke used L.
Matthaean priority	Two‑gospel (Griesbach) (Matthew–Luke)		Mark primarily has collected what Matthew and Luke share in common (Marcan posteriority).
Matthaean priority	Augustinian (Matthew–Mark)		The oldest known view, still advocated by some. Mark's special place is neither priority nor posteriority, but as the intermediate between the other two synoptic gospels. Canonical order is based on this view having been assumed (at the time when New Testament Canon was finalized).
Lucan priority	Jerusalem school (Luke–Q)		A Greek anthology (A), translated literally from a Hebrew original, was used by each gospel. Luke also drew from an earlier lost gospel, a reconstruction (R) of the life of Jesus reconciling the anthology with yet another narrative work. Matthew has not used Luke directly.
Marcion priority	Priority of the Gospel of Marcion		All gospels directly used the gospel of Marcion as their source, and have been influenced heavily by it.
Others or none	Multi‑source		Each gospel drew from a different combination of hypothetical earlier documents.
Others or none	Proto‑gospel		The gospels each derive, all or some of, its material from a common proto-gospel (Ur-Gospel), possibly in Hebrew or Aramaic.
Others or none	Q+/Papias (Mark–Q/Matthew)		Each document drew from each of its predecessors, including Logoi (Q+) and Papias' Exposition.
Others or none	Independence		Each gospel is an independent and original composition based upon oral history.

== See also ==
- Aramaic primacy
- Authorship of the Gospels
- Biblical criticism
- Gospel harmony
- List of Gospels
- List of key episodes in the Canonical Gospels
- Source criticism
