= Q source =

Hypothetical source of gospel contents

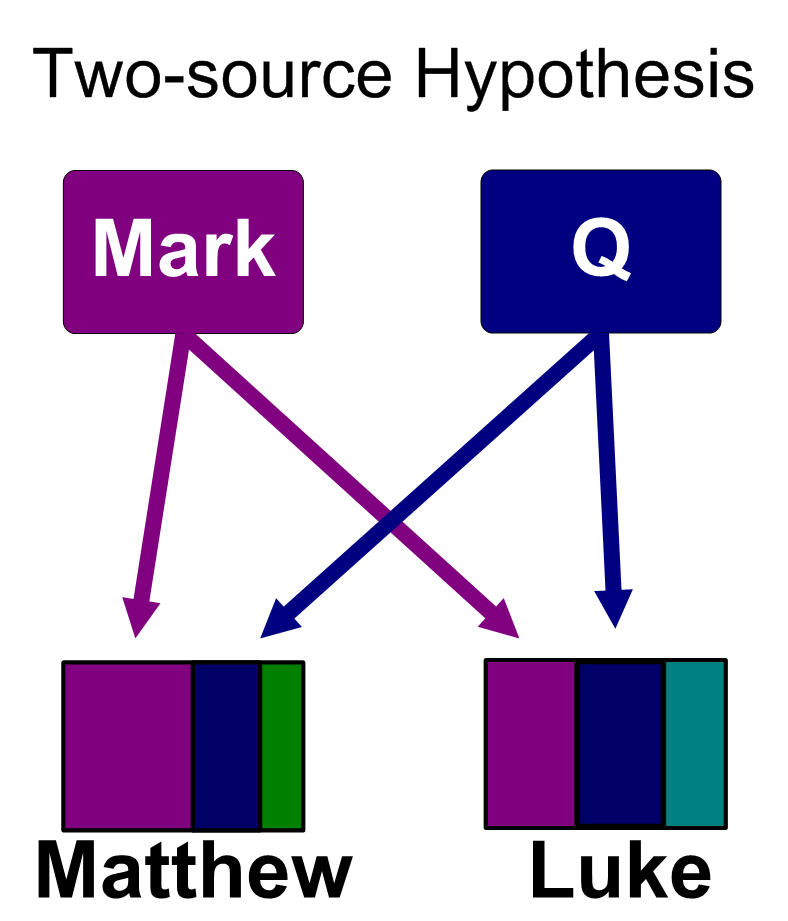
The "Two-source Hypothesis" proposes that the Gospels of Matthew and Luke were written independently, each using Mark and a second hypothetical document called "Q" as a source. Q was conceived as the most likely explanation behind the common material (mostly sayings) found in the Gospel of Matthew and the Gospel of Luke but not in the Gospel of Mark. Material from two other sources—the M source and the L source—are represented in the Gospels of Matthew and Luke here by green and teal respectively.

The Q source (also called the Sayings Gospel, Q Gospel, Q document(s), or Q; from German: Quelle, meaning "source") is a hypothesized written collection of primarily Jesus' sayings (λόγια, logia). Q is part of the common material found in the Gospels of Matthew and Luke but not in the Gospel of Mark. According to this hypothesis, this material was drawn from the early Church's oral gospel traditions.

Q had been hypothesized by 1900 alongside Marcan priority. Some scholars have postulated that Q is actually a plurality of sources, some written and some oral. Others have attempted to determine the stages in which Q was composed. Despite the two-source hypothesis enjoying wide support, Q's existence has been increasingly questioned by alternative theories such as the Farrer and Matthean Posteriority hypotheses.

== History ==
For centuries, biblical scholars followed the Augustinian hypothesis: that the Gospel of Matthew was the first to be written, Mark used Matthew in the writing of his, and Luke followed both Matthew and Mark in his (the Gospel of John is quite different from the other three, which because of their similarity are called the Synoptic Gospels). Nineteenth-century New Testament scholars who rejected Matthew's priority in favor of Marcan priority speculated that Matthew's and Luke's authors drew the material they have in common with the Gospel of Mark from the Gospel of Mark. However, Matthew and Luke also share large sections of text not found in Mark. They suggested that neither Gospel drew upon the other, but upon a second common source, termed Q. (Note: This hypothetical lost text—also called the Q Gospel, the Sayings Gospel Q, the Secret of Q, the Synoptic Sayings Source, the Q Manuscript, and (in the 19th century) The Logia—is said to have comprised a collection of Jesus' sayings. Acceptance of the theories of the existence of "Q" and the priority of Mark are the two key elements in the "two-source hypothesis". (See also the Gospel of the Hebrews and Streeter.)) Along with Marcan priority, Q had been hypothesized by 1900, and enjoyed dominance in synoptic scholarship from the foundation of the International Q Project in 1983 until recent times; much of this ended with Mark Goodacre's Case Against Q, and many scholars today have come to doubt rather than defend Q. B. H. Streeter formulated a widely accepted view of Q: that it was written in Koine Greek; that most of its contents appear in Matthew, in Luke, or in both; and that Luke better preserves the text's original order than does Matthew. In the two-source hypothesis, the three-source hypothesis and the Q+/Papias hypothesis, Matthew and Luke both used Mark and Q as sources. Some scholars have postulated that Q is actually a plurality of sources, some written and some oral. Others have attempted to determine the stages in which Q was composed.

Despite the two-source hypothesis enjoying wide support, Q's existence has been increasingly questioned by alternative theories such as Farrer and Matthean Posteriority. A collection of dominical sayings would have been highly valuable to early Christians, but figures such as Jerome, who had access to the vast Library of Caesarea, make no mention of such a document. The making of copies of Q may have been seen as unnecessary, since its contents were preserved in the canonical gospels. Indeed, Christians may have preferred to make copies of the Gospels of Matthew and Luke, "where the sayings of Jesus from Q were rephrased to avoid misunderstandings, and to fit their own situations and their understanding of what Jesus had really meant".

Herbert Marsh is seen by some as the first person to hypothesize the existence of a "narrative" source and a "sayings" source, although he included in the latter parables unique to Matthew and unique to Luke. In his 1801 work, A dissertation on the Origin and Composition of our Three First Canonical Gospels, he used the Hebrew letter aleph (א) to denote the narrative source and the letter beth (ב) to denote the sayings source.

The next person to advance the "sayings" hypothesis was the German Friedrich Schleiermacher in 1832. Schleiermacher interpreted an enigmatic statement by the early Christian writer Papias of Hierapolis, c. 95–109 AD ("Matthew compiled the oracles (logia) of the Lord in a Hebrew manner of speech, and everyone translated them as well he could") as evidence of a separate source. Rather than the traditional interpretation—that Papias was referring to the writing of Matthew in Hebrew—Schleiermacher proposed that Papias was actually referring to a sayings collection of the apostle Matthew that was later used, together with narrative elements, by another "Matthew" and by the other Evangelists.

In 1838, another German, Christian Hermann Weisse, took Schleiermacher's suggestion of a sayings source and combined it with the idea of Marcan priority to formulate what is now called the Two-Source Hypothesis, in which both Matthew and Luke used Mark and the sayings source. Heinrich Julius Holtzmann endorsed this approach in an influential treatment of the synoptic problem in 1863, and the two-source hypothesis has dominated ever since.

At this time, the second source was usually called the Logia, or Logienquelle ('logia-source'), because of Papias's statement, and Holtzmann gave it the symbol Lambda (Λ). However, toward the end of the 19th century, doubts began to grow about the propriety of anchoring its existence to Papias's account, with the symbol Q (which was devised by Johannes Weiss to denote Quelle, meaning 'source') adopted instead to remain neutral about the connection of Papias to the collection of sayings.

This two-source hypothesis speculates that Matthew borrowed from both Mark and Q. For most scholars, Q accounts for what Matthew and Luke share—sometimes in exactly the same words—but that are absent in Mark. Examples are the Devil's three temptations of Jesus, the Beatitudes, the Lord's Prayer, and many individual sayings.

In The Four Gospels: A Study of Origins (1924), Burnett Hillman Streeter argued that a third hypothetical source, referred to as M, lies behind the material in Matthew that has no parallel in Mark or Luke, and that some material present only in Luke might have come from an also unknown L source. This hypothesis posits that underlying the Gospels of Matthew and Luke are at least four sources, namely the Gospel of Mark and three lost texts: Q, M, and L.

Throughout the remainder of the 20th century, there were various challenges and refinements of Streeter's hypothesis. For example, in his 1953 book The Gospel Before Mark, Pierson Parker posited an early version of Matthew (Aramaic M or proto-Matthew) as the primary source. Parker argued that it was not possible to separate Streeter's "M" material from the material in Matthew parallel to Mark.

In the early 20th century, more than a dozen reconstructions of Q were made. However, they differed so much from each other that no one verse of Matthew was present in all of the Q reconstructions. As a result, interest in Q subsided, and the topic was neglected for many decades.

Following the discovery of the Gospel of Thomas in the Nag Hammadi library, the Jesus Seminar proposed that such an apocryphal Gospel could be the Q source, but many scholars reject this hypothesis, since they place Thomas and similar apocrypha in the first half of the 2nd century CE. It has also been proposed that the Q source and the Gospel of Thomas have another, older common source between them, referred to as the Common Sayings Source.

== Composition ==
Redactional speculation, notably in the work of John S. Kloppenborg analyzing certain literary and thematic phenomena, argued that Q was composed in three stages. In the view of Kloppenborg, the earliest stage of its redaction was a collection of wisdom sayings involving issues such as poverty and discipleship. Then, he posits, this collection was expanded by including a layer of judgmental sayings directed against "this generation". The final stage included the Temptation of Jesus narrative.

Although Kloppenborg cautioned against assuming that Q's composition history is the same as the history of the Jesus tradition (i.e., that the oldest layer of Q is necessarily the oldest and pure-layer Jesus tradition), some recent seekers of the Historical Jesus, including members of the Jesus Seminar, have done just that. Basing their reconstructions primarily on the Gospel of Thomas and the oldest layer of Q, they propose that Jesus functioned as a wisdom sage, rather than a rabbi, though not all members affirm the two-source hypothesis. Kloppenborg is now a fellow of the Jesus Seminar himself.

However, scholars supporting the three-stage Q development hypothesis, such as Burton L. Mack, argue that Q's unity comes not only from its being shared by Matthew and Luke, but also because, in the layers of Q as reconstructed, the later layers build upon and presuppose the earlier ones, whereas the reverse is not the case. In this argument, evidence that Q has been revised is not evidence for disunity in Q, since the hypothesised revisions depend upon asymmetric logical connections between what are posited to be the later and earlier layers.

Some biblical scholars believe that an unknown redactor composed a Greek-language proto-Gospel. It may have been circulating in written form about the time the Synoptic Gospels were composed (i.e., between late 50s and mid-90s AD). The name Q was coined by the German theologian and biblical scholar Johannes Weiss.

=== Synoptic Gospels and the nature of Q ===
The relationship among the three synoptic gospels goes beyond mere similarity in viewpoint. The gospels often recount the same stories, usually in the same order, sometimes using the same words. Scholars note that the similarities among Mark, Matthew, and Luke are too great to be coincidental.

If the two-source hypothesis is correct, then Q would probably have been a written document. If Q was a shared oral tradition, it is unlikely that it could account for the nearly identical word-for-word similarities between Matthew and Luke when quoting Q material. Similarly, it is possible to deduce that Q was written in Greek. If the Gospels of Matthew and Luke were referring to a document that had been written in some other language (such as Aramaic), it is highly unlikely that two independent translations would have exactly the same wording.

The Q document must have been composed before Matthew and Luke; some scholars even suggest that Q predated Mark. A date for the final Q document is often placed in the 40s or 50s of the 1st century, with some arguing its so-called sapiential layer (1Q, containing six wisdom speeches) was written as early as the 30s.

If Q existed, physical copies of it have since been lost. Some scholars, however, believe it can be partially reconstructed by examining elements common to Matthew and Luke (but absent from Mark). Versions of this reconstructed Q do not overtly mention key narrative events of Jesus' life, such as his birth, death and resurrection. Nevertheless, Q shows evidence of presupposing (some) of these events: Scholars widely believe that the hypothetical Q source presupposes Jesus' death when referencing the "cross" in Q 14:27, the various references to opposition & persecution (6:22-23; 11:49-51; 13:34-35), with Jesus being "the culmination of the list of Wisdom’s prophetic delegates who have been consistently killed from the time of Abel onwards." Other scholars likewise affirm Jesus' death in the Q source without any in-depth discussion.

=== Case for Q ===
The case for Q's existence follows from the argument that neither Matthew nor Luke is directly dependent on the other in the double tradition (defined by New Testament scholars as material that Matthew and Luke share that does not appear in Mark). However, the verbal agreement between Matthew and Luke is so close in some parts of the double tradition that the most reasonable explanation for this agreement is common dependence on a written source or sources. Even if Matthew and Luke are independent (see Marcan priority), the Q hypothesis states that they used a common document. Arguments for Q being a written document include:

- Sometimes the exactness in wording is striking, for example, Matthew 6:24 and Luke 16:13, (27 and 28 Greek words respectively); Matthew 7:7–8 and Luke 11:9–10, (24 Greek words each).
- There is sometimes commonality in order between the two, for example the Sermon on the Plain and Sermon on the Mount.
- The presence of doublets, where Matthew and Luke sometimes each present two versions of a similar saying but in different context, only one of those versions appearing in Mark. Doublets may be considered a sign of two written sources, i.e., Mark and Q.
- Luke mentions that he knows of other written sources of Jesus' life, and that he has investigated in order to gather the most information.

The fact that no Q manuscripts exist today does not necessarily argue against its existence. Many early Christian texts no longer exist, and are only known of through citation or mention of them in surviving texts. Once Q's text was incorporated into the body of Matthew and Luke, it may have been no longer necessary to preserve it, just as interest in copying Mark seems to have waned substantially once it was incorporated into Matthew. The editorial board of the International Q Project writes: "During the second century, when the canonizing process was taking place, scribes did not make new copies of Q, since the canonizing process involved choosing what should and what should not be used in the church service. Hence they preferred to make copies of the Gospels of Matthew and Luke, where the sayings of Jesus from Q were rephrased to avoid misunderstandings, and to fit their own situations and their understanding of what Jesus had really meant."

=== Case against Q ===
The existence of the "minor agreements" within the two-source hypothesis has raised serious concerns. These minor agreements are those points where Matthew and Luke agree against or beyond Mark precisely within their Marcan verses (for example, the mocking question at the beating of Jesus, "Who is it that struck you?", found in both Matthew and Luke but not in Mark, although this "minor agreement" falls outside the usually accepted range of Q). The "minor agreements" call into question the proposition that Matthew and Luke knew Mark but not each other, e.g. Luke might have indeed been following Matthew, or at least a Matthew-like source. Peabody and McNicol argue that until a reasonable explanation is found, the two-source hypothesis is not viable.

One of the strongest points against Q is the fact that such a document has never been found, in whole or in part. New Testament scholar James Edwards argues that the existence of a treasured sayings document in circulation going unmentioned by early Church Fathers remains one of the great conundrums of modern Biblical scholarship. Pier Franco Beatrice argues that until these issues are resolved, Q will remain in doubt.

Some scholars argue that the Gospel according to the Hebrews was the basis for the synoptic tradition. They point out that in the first section of De Viris Illustribus (Jerome), the Gospel of Mark is where it should be as it was the first gospel written and was used as a source for the later gospels. Following it should be Q; but not only is Q not where it should be at the start of Jerome's work, this treasured work recording the Logia of Christ is mentioned nowhere by him. Rather, the document mentioned in the second section is not Q, but the Gospel according to the Hebrews.

Austin Farrer, Michael Goulder, and Mark Goodacre have also argued against Q, maintaining Marcan priority, claiming the use of Matthew by Luke. This view has come to be known as the Farrer hypothesis. Their arguments include:

- Farrer, in his 1955 paper that first outlined this hypothesis, notes that when two documents contain common material, identical in the words and phrases they use to describe some scenes, the simplest explanation is that one of the two used the other as a source, rather than both using a third document as a source.
- Goulder points to common Matthean phrases such as "brood of vipers", "make fruit", and "cast into the fire" that each appear in Luke only once, in a Q passage. Goulder's conclusion, based on writing styles, is that Matthew is the source for these "Q" sayings.
- Goodacre notes that there is no extant copy of Q and that no early church writer makes an unambiguous reference to a document resembling the Q that modern scholars have reconstructed from the common material in Luke and Matthew.

While supporters say that the discovery of the Gospel of Thomas supports the concept of a "sayings gospel", Mark Goodacre points out that Q has a narrative structure as reconstructed and is not simply a list of sayings.

Other scholars have brought other arguments against Q:

Two documents, both correcting Mark's language, adding birth narratives and a resurrection epilogue, and adding a large amount of "sayings material", are likely to resemble each other, rather than to have such similar scope by coincidence. Specifically, there are 347 instances (by Neirynck's count) where one or more words are added to the Marcan text in both Matthew and Luke; these are called the "minor agreements" against Mark. Some 198 instances involve one word, 82 involve two words, 35 three, 16 four, and 16 instances involve five or more words in the extant texts of Matthew and Luke as compared to Marcan passages. John Wenham (1913–1996) adhered to the Augustinian hypothesis that Matthew was the first Gospel, Mark the second, and Luke the third, and objected on similar grounds to those who hold to the Griesbach hypothesis. Eta Linnemann, formerly a follower of Rudolf Bultmann, rejected Q, and Marcan priority, for a variation of the Two Gospel hypothesis that holds that the Mosaic requirement for "two witnesses" made two Jewish Gospels a necessity in the Diaspora audiences.

== Notable contents ==
Some of the more notable portions of the New Testament are believed to have been first recorded in Q:

- John the Baptist's "Brood of Vipers" polemic in Matthew 3:7
- Some portions of the Temptation of Christ
- The Beatitudes
- Turning the other cheek
- Love your enemies
- Golden Rule
- Judge not, lest ye be judged
- The Test of a Good Person
- The Parable of the Wise and the Foolish Builders
- The Parable of the Lost Sheep
- The Parable of the Wedding Feast
- The Parable of the Talents
- The Parable of the Leaven
- Parable of the blind leading the blind
- The Lord's Prayer
- Expounding of the Law
- The Birds of the Air

== See also ==
- Agrapha – Sayings of Jesus not found in the canonical Gospels
- Common Sayings Source – Hypothesized source document containing sayings attributed to Jesus
- Gospel harmony – Compiling events of the biblical gospels
- Documentary hypothesis – A similar theory surrounding the creation of the Torah
- Apocryphal gospels
