= Common Sayings Source =

Hypothesized source document containing sayings attributed to Jesus

The Common Sayings Source is one of many theories that attempts to provide insight into the Synoptic Problem. The theory posits that the Gospel of Thomas, a sayings gospel, and the Q source, a hypothetical sayings gospel, have a common source. Elements of this Common Sayings Source can be found in the text of the Gospel of Thomas and what scholars are proposing existed in the Q source. The high level of similarities between the two sources suggests that both documents are later redactions of a single source, the original Common Sayings Source, which was then redacted by different groups to suit their own needs.

The main proponent of the theory is John Dominic Crossan. He chaired the historical Jesus section of the Society of Biblical Literature and was co-director of the Jesus Seminar. The theory is based on research previously done by John Kloppenborg on the Q source, William Arnal on the Gospel of Thomas, and Stephen Patterson on the Common Tradition. John Dominic Crossan uses these scholars’ research and combines them to create the theory of the Common Sayings Source.

This source provides insight into the Synoptic Problem and lends more evidence for the two-document hypothesis and the Q source.

== The Common Sayings Source ==
Based on three scholars’ previous work, Crossan uses the research in order to establish his theory of a Common Sayings Source.

- John Kloppenborg had investigated the Q source and established the traditional stratification. He provided evidence to show that Q has three layers.
  - Q^{1} provides the Sapiential Layer that contains six wisdom speeches.
  - Q^{2} is the Apocalyptic Layer that has five judgment speeches.
  - Q^{3} provides the Biographical Layer with the three stories of the temptations in the desert.
- William Arnal provided insight into the Gospel of Thomas and developed the idea of compositional stratification. Arnal established two layers in the Gospel of Thomas, a Sapiential Layer and Gnostic Layer. The Sapiential Layer contains wisdom speeches and the Gnostic Layer contains esoteric and Gnostic wisdom.

Arnal believes that the Gnostic Layer was added to the Sapiential layer, which is where his compositional stratification theory comes from. Similarly, Kloppenborg's theory of traditional stratification suggests that the Sapiential Layer existed and the apocalyptic was later developed.

- Patterson found the Sapiential Layers of both Gospels contained similar wisdom speeches. He called this shared material “Common Tradition Source”. Patterson continued his theory further by establishing the redaction of the common material and explaining the theology of the redactors. According to Patterson, the editor of the Q source was concerned with apocalyptic issues, while the Gospel of Thomas deals with Gnostic issues.

Crossan adapts Patterson's theory to be called the Common Sayings Source because he feels that it is more than a tradition but an actual source. He agrees that the original Common Sayings Tradition, presented by Patterson, contained neither Gnosticism nor Apocalypticism, but required redactional adaptation towards either or both of those eschatologies.

The Common Sayings Source suggests that there are enough parallels in the Q source and Gospel of Thomas to suggest a common source.

- 28% (37 out of 132 units) of the Gospel of Thomas has parallels in Q.
- 37% (37 out of 101 units) of Q has parallels in the Gospel of Thomas.

Crossan uses the data provided by the International Q Project in order to compare the two sources together and points out that approximately one third of each gospel is found in the other.

The high level of similarities leads Crossan to believe that there must have been a common source. Similar to the reasoning behind the two-document hypothesis for the existence of a Q source, the percentage of common material found in Thomas and Q would suggest an earlier source shared by the authors of both documents. However, unlike Q, the Common Sayings Source is presumed to be oral, due to a lack of common order or sequence. This is not to say that a written document is an impossibility. It is clear in the Synoptic Gospels that it was common for authors to edit works for their own needs, including the slight change in the order or sequence.

Crossan believes that this Common Sayings Source provided a foundation for the two later documents known as Q and The Gospel of Thomas.

== The synoptic problem ==
The common material believed to be the Common Sayings Source can be found in the “special” material of the Synoptic Gospels.

- 30% (11 out of 37 units) of what is common to the Gospel of Thomas and Q Gospel has parallels in Mark.
- 12% (16 out of 132 units) of the Gospel of Thomas has parallels in material special to Matthew.
- 7% (9 out of 132 units) of the Gospel of Thomas has parallels in material special to Luke.

These statistics provide evidence that the Q source and Gospel of Thomas material play a minor role in the Synoptic Gospels. The Common Sayings source does not provide an alternative solution to the Synoptic Problem, but provides a deeper understanding of the two-document theory.

This argument is considered a straw man when one observes that Q is not extant, and that 72 logia of the 114 (63%) that are in Thomas, have parallels in the Synoptic Gospels. If there was a Q, the Gospel of Thomas is more than a perfect fit, with two thirds of it appearing in the four canonical gospels alone

As a hypothetical document, the Q source is still only a hypothesis. Prior to the discovery of the Gospel of Thomas in 1945 it was thought that a Gospel without a narrative that only contained sayings was out of the question. The find of the Gospel of Thomas in Nag Hammadi changed the possibility of a gospel of sayings. The possibility of the Q source being an ancient document has become closer to reality with the discovery of Thomas.

Crossan's theory provides further evidence that there is a connection between these two sources and if we find some of Q in Thomas that it is possible that these common sayings came from an earlier source. This evidence provides further evidence of the existence of the Common Sayings Source.

== Arguments in support ==
A debate has formed around the dating of the Gospel of Thomas. In order for Crossan's theory to be possible, an earlier dating for the Gospel of Thomas is necessary in order to be written prior to the Synoptic Gospels, like the Q source. Some scholars suggest that due to the Gnostic content, Thomas was compiled in the 2nd Century, one century after the Synoptic Gospels. These scholars believe that the author of Thomas incorporated the Synoptic texts after their circulation began and therefore, Thomas could not have been connected to the Q source.

However, many scholars feel that the dating of Thomas rightfully belongs no later than 200 CE B. Grenfell and A. Hunt placed the Oxyrhynchus Papyrus 1, one of the oldest copies of the Gospel of Thomas, in this period. It is not the autograph copy and therefore, must have existed earlier than 200ce. Additionally, an investigation of the text provides internal evidence that suggests a date of authorship to be the beginning of the 2nd Century. This timeframe would fit well with the time of the Synoptic Gospels and lend support to the idea that Thomas may have been written around the time of Q.

Koester adds insight when he concluded that Thomas did not evolve from the editing of Synoptic parables but from an independent oral source. From “careful analysis of the parable of the Sower in the Synoptics and Thomas, John Homan concludes not only that the version in Thomas is independent, but that it does indeed permit us to recover an earlier version of this parable.” These examples provide evidence that Crossan's theory may be accurate when he discusses an early dating of Thomas and the independent oral source.

Another important issue of Crossan's theory is discovering whether or not the connections between Q and Thomas are anything more than a coincidence. Many scholars seem to have no issue believing that Thomas began from an oral tradition, which is suggested by the theory of the Common Sayings Source. Koester believes “Thomas is either dependent upon the earliest version of Q, or more likely shares with the author of Q one or several early collections of Jesus’ sayings ... Thus Thomas attests to a stage in the Logoi Gattung shared by Q and Thomas which had not yet been redacted under the influence of Apocalyptic expectation.” This seems surprisingly similar to the Common Sayings Source theory where Crossan contends that a common source without apocalyptic or Gnostic information is the source for Q and Thomas. McLean provides an explanation for any slight variation that can be found between the sayings in the two sources. “One would expect that the discrete sayings collections available to Q and Thomas would have varied in content and been made available at different times.”

Even those who oppose Crossan's theory, like Deconick, find themselves confused when attempting to locate the possible source for Thomas. Even though she believes the Common Sayings Source theory is unlikely, she does admit that “Thomas emerged as an oral text,” which is not out of line from what Crossan has suggested.

== Reactions ==
The theory of the Common Sayings Source relies a great deal on the acceptance of the two-source hypothesis or the three-source hypothesis and the existence of the Q source. In addition to the hypothetical material in the Q source, another important factor to the Common Sayings source is the information provided in the Gospel of Thomas. The Gospel of Thomas is a relatively recent discovery and it is possible that there were other versions of the text, as can be said in the case of many other early Christian writings. A change in either the accepted Q document or another version of Thomas may prove to contain either more or less parallels. This could cause issues with or support to the Common Sayings Source theory.

A number of articles have been written reviewing Crossan's book, The Birth of Christianity, where he discusses the Common Sayings Source theory. Many of these make the same comments regarding his theory. William Loader of Murdoch University comments, “Crossan’s proposals are too inflexible, too much of a methodological ‘short-cut’.” He explains that

Crossan depends heavily on assuming that the Thomas tradition never knew Jesus sayings with such emphasis, an argument from silence either way. So much is made to depend on this and on the supposition that the earliest layer of Q as reconstructed by Kloppenborg, was exclusively normative, that is, its failure, allegedly, to include apocalyptic sayings reflected rejection of them, their eschatology and, as with John, their theism.

Loader points out a number of issues with Crossan’s overall methodology and issues with the glossing over of important issues. Loader is not the only scholar to call attention to this deficiency.

Christopher Mount of Chicago University had described Crossan’s methodology as “overly simplified.” Mount feels that Crossan's unwillingness to question a fundamental perspective of the Christian sources with which he is working is evident at many points in his reconstruction, which leads to a slant in his generally well-thought-out analysis. Nonetheless, Mount ends his review by stating that attempting to better Crossan's work “cannot be done with greater force of argument and command of the data than [he] has brought to bear on the task.”

Crossan relies heavily on the work of John Kloppenborg, who does not outwardly support Crossan's theory. “A documentary hypothesis for the relationship between Q and Thomas must be ruled out.” Kloppenborg points out that there are instances of overlap that scholars believe are Common Sayings Source material found in the wisdom speeches, “Thomas lacks elements present in Q, which had Thomas known Q, would surely have taken over.” Kloppenborg created the stratification theory in Q that Crossan relies on but it seems that Kloppenborg does not agree with the use of his theory to create a comparison between his layering of Q and the layering of the Gospel of Thomas.

Deconick also points out that “equally questionable is the reliance on Kloppenborg’s hypothetical model of stratification for Q.” Crossan admits in his work that his theory is heavily dependent on the accuracy of the three theories that he has combined, including the hypothetical Q source. Deconick uses this fact as an argument against Crossan's theory. She also explains that she is “reluctant to concede an early “sapiential” Thomas and that she finds it impossible to work from the premise that Thomas represents a collection of early sapiential non apocalyptic sayings and that the earliest stratification of Q must have been similar in content to it.” This is one of the cornerstones to Crossan’s theory. She adds that “we cannot assume that Thomas was originally or entirely a sapiential gospel. This also meant that we cannot assume that Q was sapiential because Thomas was sapiential.”
