= Two-source hypothesis =

Hypothesis in biblical criticism

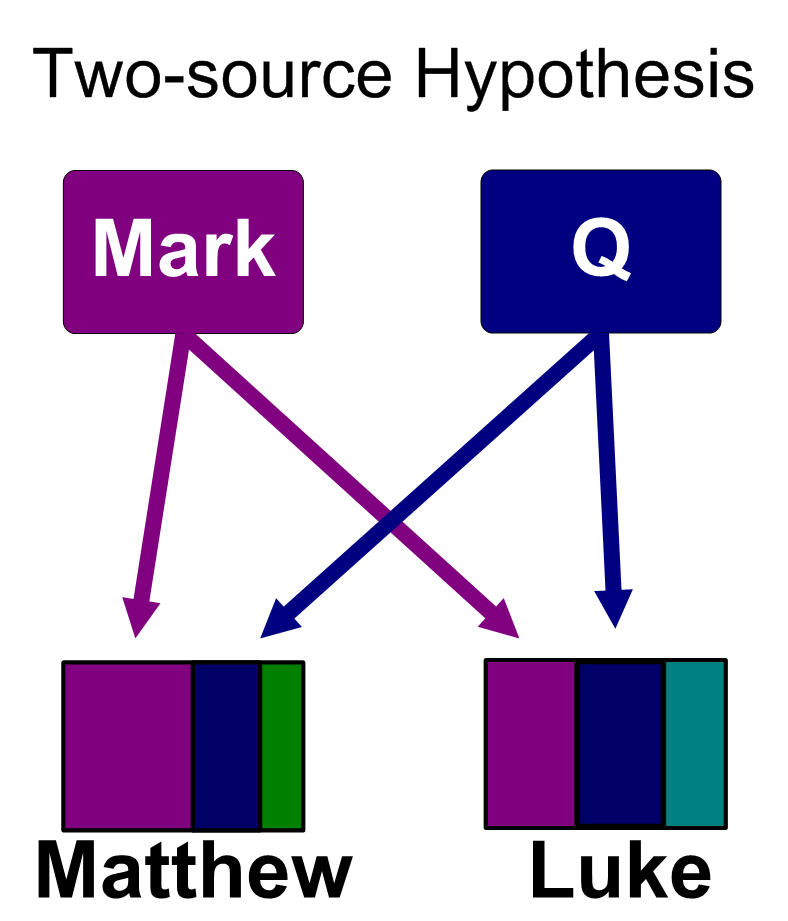

Theory Information
- Order: Mark, Q Matt, Luke
- Additional Sources: Q source

Gospels' Sources
- Matthew: Mark, Q
- Luke: Mark, Q

Theory History
- Originator: Christian Hermann Weisse
- Origination Date: 1838
- Proponents: Heinrich Julius Holtzmann; William Sanday; B.H. Streeter

The two-source hypothesis (or 2SH) is an explanation for the synoptic problem, the pattern of similarities and differences among the three Gospels of Matthew, Mark and Luke. It posits that the Gospel of Matthew and the Gospel of Luke were based on the Gospel of Mark and a hypothetical sayings collection from the Christian oral tradition called Q.

The two-source hypothesis emerged in the 19th century. B. H. Streeter definitively stated the case in 1924, adding that two other sources, referred to as M and L, lie behind the material in Matthew and Luke respectively. The strengths of the hypothesis are its explanatory power regarding the shared and non-shared material in the three gospels; its weaknesses lie in the exceptions to those patterns, and in the hypothetical nature of its proposed collection of Jesus-sayings. Later scholars have advanced numerous elaborations and variations on the basic hypothesis, and even completely alternative hypotheses that are increasing in popularity.

When Streeter's two additional sources, M and L, are taken into account, this hypothesis is sometimes referred to as the four-document hypothesis.

== History ==
The two-source hypothesis was first articulated in 1838 by Christian Hermann Weisse, but it did not gain wide acceptance among German critics until Heinrich Julius Holtzmann endorsed it in 1863. Prior to Holtzmann, most Catholic scholars held to the Augustinian hypothesis (Matthew → Mark → Luke) and Protestant biblical critics favored the Griesbach hypothesis (Matthew → Luke → Mark). The Two-Source Hypothesis crossed the channel into England in the 1880s primarily due to the efforts of William Sanday, culminating in B. H. Streeter's definitive statement of the case in 1924. Streeter further argued that additional sources, referred to as M and L, lie behind the material in Matthew and Luke respectively.

== Background: the synoptic problem ==
The hypothesis is a solution to what is known as the synoptic problem: the question of how best to account for the differences and similarities between the three synoptic gospels, Matthew, Mark and Luke. The answer to this problem has implications for the order in which the three were composed, and the sources on which their authors drew.

Any solution to the synoptic problem needs to account for two features:

- The "triple tradition": The three gospels frequently share both wording and arrangement of "pericopes" (incidents, stories - this substantial sharing is what led to them being called "synoptic", or seeing-together). Where they differ on this shared material, Mark and Luke will agree against Matthew, or Mark and Matthew will agree against Luke, but very rarely will Mark be the odd one out. Matthew's and Luke's versions of shared pericopes will usually be shorter than Mark's.
- The "double tradition": Sometimes Matthew and Luke share material which is not present in Mark. In these cases Matthew and Luke sometimes parallel each other closely, but at other times are widely divergent.

== Overview of the hypothesis ==
The 2SH attempts to solve the synoptic problem by advancing two propositions, Marcan priority to explain the triple tradition, and the existence of a lost Q document to solve the double tradition. In summary, the two-source hypothesis proposes that Matthew and Luke used Mark for its narrative material as well as for the basic structural outline of chronology of Jesus' life; and that Matthew and Luke use a second source, Q (from German Quelle, "source"), not extant, for the sayings (logia) found in both of them but not in Mark.

=== Marcan priority ===
The 2SH explains the features of the triple tradition by proposing that both Matthew and Luke used Mark as a source. Mark appears more 'primitive': his diction and grammar are less literary than Matthew and Luke, his language is more prone to redundancy and obscurity, his Christology is less supernatural, and he makes more frequent use of Aramaic. The more sophisticated versions of Mark's pericopes in Matthew and Luke must be either the result of those two "cleaning up" Mark, if his is the first gospel, or of Mark "dumbing down" Matthew and/or Luke, if he was later. Critics regard the first explanation as the more likely. On a more specific level, Marcan priority seems to be indicated due to instances where Matthew and Luke apparently omit explanatory material from Mark, where Matthew adds his own theological emphases to Mark's stories, and in the uneven distribution of Mark's stylistic features in Matthew.

=== The existence of Q ===
The 2SH explains the double tradition by postulating the existence of a lost "sayings of Jesus" document known as Q, from the German Quelle, "source". It is this, rather than Marcan priority, which forms the distinctive feature of the 2SH as against rival theories. The existence of Q follows from the conclusion that, as Luke and Matthew are independent of Mark in the double tradition, the connection between them must be explained by their joint but independent use of a missing source or sources. (That they used Q independently of each other follows from the fact that they frequently differ quite widely in their use of this source). Alan Kirk and John Kloppenborg are notable defenders of the hypothesis today.

== Problems with the hypothesis ==
While the 2SH remains the most popular explanation for the origins of the synoptic gospels, two questions – the existence of the so-called "minor agreements," and problems with the hypothesis of Q – continue at the centre of discussion over its explanatory power, and alternative hypotheses that posit the direct use of Matthew by Luke or vice versa without Q are increasing in popularity within scholarship.

=== The minor agreements ===
The "minor agreements" are those points where Matthew and Luke agree against Mark (for example, the mocking question at the beating of Jesus, "Who is it that struck you?", found in both Matthew and Luke but not in Mark). The "minor agreements" thus call into question the proposition that Matthew and Luke knew Mark but not each other. Streeter devoted a chapter to the matter, arguing that the Matthew/Luke agreements were due to coincidence, or to the result of the two authors' reworking of Mark into more refined Greek, or to overlaps with Q or oral tradition, or to textual corruption.

A few later scholars explain the minor agreements as being due to Luke's using Matthew in addition to Q and Mark (3SH). But the modern argument for Q requires Matthew and Luke to be independent, so the 3SH raises the question of how to establish a role for Q if Luke is dependent on Matthew. Accordingly, some scholars (like Helmut Koester) who wish to keep Q while acknowledging the force of the minor agreements attribute them to a proto-Mark, such as the Ur-Markus in the Marcan Hypothesis (MkH), adapted by Mark independently from its use by Matthew and Luke. Still other scholars feel that the minor agreements are due to a revision of the Mark found in the Bible, called deutero-Mark. In this case, both Matthew and Luke are dependent on proto-Mark, which did not survive the ages.

"Therefore, the minor agreements, if taken seriously, force a choice between accepting pure Marcan priority on one hand or the existence of Q on the other hand, but not both simultaneously as the 2SH requires."

=== Problems with Q ===
A principal objection to the 2SH is that it requires a hypothetical document, Q, the existence of which is not attested, either by existing fragments or by early Church tradition. The minor agreements are also, according to the critics, evidence of the non-existence of, or rather the non-necessity for, Q: if Matthew and Luke have passages which are missing in Mark (the "Who is it that struck you?" sentence quoted above is a famous example), this demonstrates only that Matthew is quoting Luke or vice versa.

Two additional problems are noteworthy, the "problem of fatigue" and the Q narrative problem. The first relates to the phenomenon that a scribe, when copying a text, will tend to converge on his source out of simple fatigue. Thus Mark calls Herod by the incorrect title basileus, "king", throughout, while Matthew begins with the more correct tetrarches but eventually switches to basileus. When similar changes occur in double tradition material, which according to the 2SH are the result of Matthew and Luke relying on Q, they usually show Luke converging on Matthew.

Pierson Parker in 1940 suggested that the non-canonical Gospel of the Hebrews was the second source used in the Gospel of Luke. This view is yet to gain influence.

== Variants ==
The two-document hypothesis emerged in the 19th century: Mark as the earliest gospel, Matthew and Luke written independently and reliant on both Mark and the hypothetical Q. In 1924 B. H. Streeter refined the two-document hypothesis into the four-document hypothesis based on the possibility of a Jewish M source (see the Gospel according to the Hebrews).

While the standard two-source theory holds Mark and Q to be independent, some argue that Q was also a source for Mark. This is sometimes called the Modified two-document hypothesis (although that term was also used in older literature to refer to the Four-document hypothesis).

A number of scholars have suggested a Three-source hypothesis, that Luke actually did make some use of Matthew after all. This allows much more flexibility in the reconstruction of Q.

Dunn proposes an Oral Q hypothesis, in which Q is not a document but a body of oral teachings.

== Other hypotheses ==
Some form of the Two Source hypothesis continues to be preferred by a majority of New Testament scholars as the theory that is best able to resolve the synoptic problem. Nevertheless, doubts about the problems of the minor agreements and, especially, the hypothetical Q, have produced alternative hypotheses.

In 1955 a British scholar, A. M. Farrer, proposed that one could dispense with Q by arguing that Luke revised both Mark and Matthew. In 1965 an American scholar, William R. Farmer, also seeking to do away with the need for Q, revived an updated version of Griesbach's idea that Mark condensed both Matthew and Luke. In Britain, the most influential modern opponents of the 2SH favor the Farrer hypothesis, while Farmer's revised Griesbach hypothesis, also known as the Two Gospel hypothesis, is probably the chief rival to the Two Source hypothesis in America.

In 1838, the German theologian Christian Gottlob Wilke argued for a solution that combined Marcan priority with an extensively developed argument for Matthew's direct dependence upon both Mark and Luke. Thus, like Farrer, Wilke's hypothesis has no need for Q, but it simply reverses the direction of presumed dependence between Matthew and Luke proposed by Farrer. A few other German scholars supported Wilke's hypothesis in the nineteenth century, but in time most came to accept the two-source hypothesis, which remains the dominant theory to this day. The Wilke hypothesis was accepted by Karl Kautsky in his Foundations of Christianity and has begun to receive new attention in recent decades since its revival in 1992 by Huggins, then Hengel, then independently by Blair. Additional recent supporters include Garrow and Powell.

The traditional view is represented by the Augustinian hypothesis, which is that the four gospels were written in the order in which they appear in the bible (Matthew → Mark → Luke), with Mark a condensed edition of Matthew. This hypothesis was based on the claim by the 2nd century AD bishop Papias that he had heard that Matthew wrote first. By the 18th century the problems with Augustine's idea led Johann Jakob Griesbach to put forward the Griesbach hypothesis, which was that Luke had revised Matthew and that Mark had then written a shorter gospel using material on which both Matthew and Luke agreed (Matthew → Luke → Mark).

A variant of the Augustinian hypothesis, attempting to synchronise Matthew and Mark on the basis of the Mosaic "two witnesses" requirement of Deuteronomy 19:15 (Matthew + Mark → Luke), was proposed by Eta Linnemann, following rejection of the view of her teacher Rudolf Bultmann.

== See also ==
- Biblical criticism
- Historicity of Jesus
- Q+/Papias hypothesis
- Common Sayings Source
- Gospel harmony
