= B. H. Streeter =

English Anglican theologian and biblical scholar (1874–1937)

The Reverend B. H. Streeter FBA
- Born: Burnett Hillman Streeter; 17 November 1874; London, England
- Died: 10 September 1937 (aged 62); Near Waldenburg, Switzerland
- Title: Provost of The Queen's College, Oxford (1933–1937)
- Spouse: Irene Streeter (m. 1910)

Ecclesiastical career
- Religion: Christianity (Anglican)
- Church: Church of England
- Ordained: 1899

Academic background
- Education: The Queen's College, Oxford
- Influences: William Sanday

Academic work
- Discipline: Biblical studies; theology
- Sub-discipline: New Testament studies
- Institutions: Pembroke College, Oxford; The Queen's College, Oxford
- Main interests: Synoptic problem
- Notable works: The Four Gospels (1924)
- Notable ideas: Four-document hypothesis
- Influenced: Aiyadurai Jesudasen Appasamy

Burnett Hillman Streeter FBA (17 November 1874 – 10 September 1937) was an English Anglican theologian, biblical scholar, and textual critic.

== Life ==
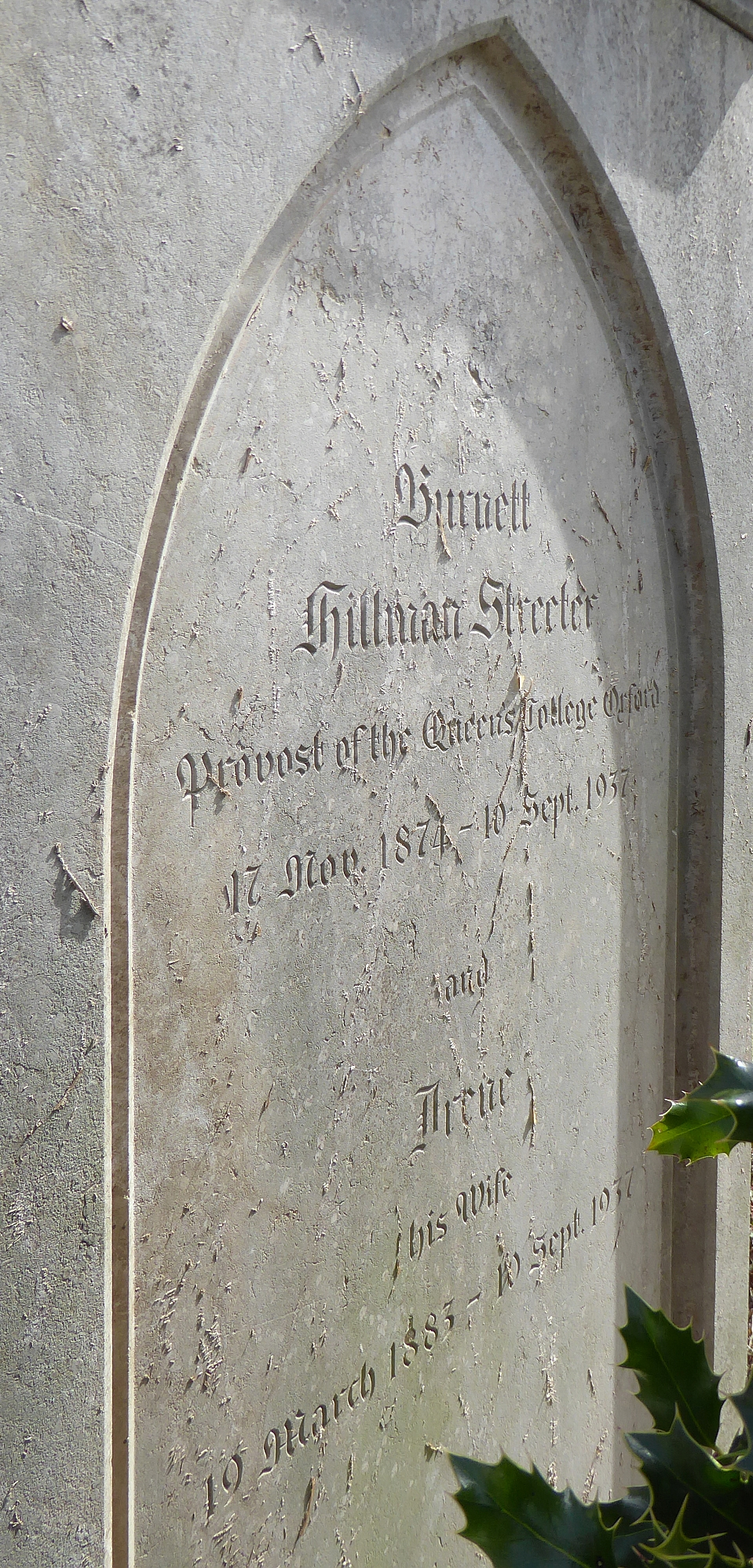
Grave at the cemetery Hörnli, Riehen, Basel

Streeter was born in Croydon, London, on 17 November 1874 and educated at The Queen's College, Oxford. He was ordained in 1899 and was a member of the Archbishops' Commission on Doctrine in the Church of England (from 1922 to 1937). In 1910, Streeter formed a group of Oxford dons known as The Group, which met weekly to discuss theological topics. He attended the 1935 Nuremberg Rally with Frank Buchman. He wrote a dozen volumes in the fields of philosophy of religion, comparative religion, and New Testament textual studies.

He was Dean Ireland's Professor of the Exegesis of Holy Scripture at the University of Oxford from 1932 to 1933, when he became Provost of Queen's College.

The most important work of Streeter was The Four Gospels: A Study of Origins (1924), in which he proposed a "four-document hypothesis" (instead of the "two-source hypothesis") as a new solution to the synoptic problem. In this work, he also developed the theory of "local texts" in the manuscript transmission of the New Testament (pp. 27–50). Johann Leonhard Hug was his forerunner.

Streeter found a new textual family: Caesarean text-type. He remarked a close textual relationship between Codex Sinaiticus and Vulgate of Jerome.

Streeter and his wife, Irene, were the only passengers on a Koolhoven FK.50, HB-AMO which crashed into Mount Kelleköpfli on a flight from Bern to Basel on 10 September 1937. The crew started the descent to Basel in low visibility due to foggy conditions. The plane hit Mount Kelleköpfli located near Waldenburg, 25 kilometres southeast of Basel airport. The pilot Walter Eberschweiler and the Streeters were killed immediately, while the radio operator/navigator Hans Huggler survived the accident, but was severely injured.

== Works ==
- Foundations: A Statement of Christian Belief in Terms of Modern Thought, (Macmillan and Co.: London 1912).
- Restatement and Reunion: A Study in First Principles (Macmillan and Co.: London 1914)
- War: This war (1914–1918) and the Sermon on the Mount (Oxford University Press: London 1915)
- Immortality: an Essay in Discovery Coordinating Scientific Psychical and Biblical Research (Macmillan Company: New York 1917)
- Woman and the Church (T. Fisher Unwin: London 1917)
- God and the Struggle for Existence (Association Press: New York 1919)
- The Message of Sadhu Sundar Singh: A Study in Mysticism and Practical Religion, (Macmillan Company: New York 1921).
- The Spirit: the Relation of God and Man, Considered from the Standpoint of Recent Philosophy and Science (Macmillan Company: New York 1922).
- The Four Gospels, a Study of Origins treating of the Manuscript Tradition, Sources, Authorship, & Dates (1924), (4th Revised Edition, Macmillan and Co.: London 1930).
- Reality: A New Correlation of Science and Religion, (Macmillan and Co.: London 1926); reprinted subsequently.
- Primitive Church Studied with Special Reference to the Origins of the Christian Ministry, (Macmillan Company: New York 1929).
- The Chained Library, (Burt Franklin: New York 1931).
- The Buddha and the Christ, Bampton Lectures (1932).
- The God who speaks, (Macmillan Company: New York 1936).

== See also ==
- Hereford Cathedral
- Moral Re-Armament

Academic offices
Preceded by Laurence Grensted	Bampton Lecturer; 1932	Succeeded by Robert Lightfoot
Preceded by Cuthbert Turner	Dean Ireland's Professor of the Exegesis of Holy Scripture; 1932–1933	Succeeded by Robert Lightfoot
Preceded by E. M. Walker	Provost of The Queen's College, Oxford; 1933–1937	Succeeded by R. H. Hodgkin
Awards
Preceded by Francis Burkitt	Burkitt Medal; 1926	Succeeded by J. H. Ropes
