= Three-source hypothesis =

Issue in biblical criticism

Theory Information
- Order: Q Marcan Priority; Matt; Luke
- Additional Sources: Q source

Gospels' Sources
- Matthew: Q, Mark
- Mark: (Q)
- Luke: Q, Mark, Matt, Luke

Theory History
- Proponents: Heinrich Julius Holtzmann, Eduard Simons, Hans Hinrich Wendt, Edward Y. Hincks, Robert Morgenthaler, Robert H. Gundry

The three-source hypothesis is a candidate solution to the synoptic problem. It combines aspects of the two-source hypothesis and the Farrer hypothesis. It states that the Gospel of Matthew and the Gospel of Luke used the Gospel of Mark and a sayings collection as primary sources, but that the Gospel of Luke also used the Gospel of Matthew as a subsidiary source. The hypothesis is named after the three documents it posits as sources, namely the sayings collection, the Gospel of Mark, and the Gospel of Matthew.

The sayings collection may be identified with Q, or with a subset of Q if some (typically narrative-related) material normally assigned to Q is instead attributed to Matthew's creativity in conjunction with Luke's use of Matthew.

This theory has been advocated by Heinrich Julius Holtzmann, Eduard Simons, Hans Hinrich Wendt, Edward Y. Hincks, Robert Morgenthaler and Robert H. Gundry.

Alternatively, M.A.T. Linssen proposes it as a variant by equating the sayings collection to the Gospel of Thomas, suggesting that Matthew and Luke worked together to write different gospels, each targeted at their own audience.

== See also ==
- Synoptic problem
- Marcan priority
- Q source
- Two-source hypothesis
- Q+/Papias hypothesis
- Common Sayings Source
