= Four-document hypothesis =

Explanation for the relationship between three Gospels of the Bible

- Four-source hypothesis

Theory Information
- Order: Mark, Q, M, L, (Antiochian document), (Document of Infancy) (Proto-Luke); Matthew, Luke
- Additional Sources: Q source, M source, L source, (Antiochian document), (Document of Infancy)

Gospels' Sources
- Matthew: Mark, Q, M, (Antiochian document)
- Luke: Mark, Q, L, (Proto-Luke), (Document of Infancy)

Theory History
- Originator: B. H. Streeter
- Origination Date: 1925

The four-document hypothesis or four-source hypothesis is an explanation for the relationship between the three Gospels of Matthew, Mark, and Luke. It posits that there were at least four sources to the Gospel of Matthew and the Gospel of Luke: the Gospel of Mark and three lost sources (Q, M, and L). It was proposed by B. H. Streeter in 1925, who refined the two-source hypothesis into a four-source hypothesis.

== Description ==
According to B. H. Streeter's analysis the non-Marcan matter in Luke has to be distinguished into at least two sources, Q and L. In a similar way he argued that Matthew used a peculiar source, which we may style M, as well as Q. Luke did not know M, and Matthew did not know L. Source M has the Judaistic character (see the Gospel according to the Hebrews), and it suggests a Jerusalem origin; source L Streeter assigned to Caesarea; and source Q, the analysis posits, was connected with Antioch. The document Q was an Antiochene translation of a document originally composed in Aramaic – possibly by the Apostle Matthew for Galilean Christians. Gospel of Luke developed in two phases (see picture).

According to this view the first gospel is a combination of the traditions of Jerusalem, Antioch, and Rome, while the third gospel represents Caesarea, Antioch, and Rome. The fact that the Antiochene and Roman sources were reproduced by both Evangelists Matthew and Luke was due to the importance of those Churches. Streeter thought there is no evidence that the other sources are less authentic.

Streeter hypothesized a proto-Luke document, an early version of Luke that did not incorporate material from Mark or the birth narrative. According to this hypothesis, the evangelist added material from Mark and the birth narratives later. Telling against this hypothesis, however, the gospel has no underlying passion tradition separate from Mark, and Luke's travel account is evidently based on Mark 10. A contemporary version of the four-source theory omits proto-Luke, with the evangelist combining Mark, Q, and L directly. Still, the gospel might have circulated originally without the birth narrative in the first two chapters.

== See also ==
- Augustinian hypothesis
- Farrer hypothesis
- Gospel harmony
- Gospel of Marcion
- Hebrew Gospel hypothesis
- Marcan priority
- Synoptic Gospels § The synoptic problem
- Two-gospel hypothesis
