= L source =

Inferred oral tradition behind Luke's gospel

Visualisation of the four-document hypothesis. "L" is the term for material unique to the Gospel of Luke.

In textual criticism of the New Testament, the L source is a hypothetical oral or textual tradition which the author of Luke–Acts may have used when composing the Gospel of Luke. Support for a distinct L source has largely faded in modern scholarship.

== Composition ==
The question of how to explain the similarities among the Gospels Matthew, Mark, and Luke is known as the synoptic problem. The hypothetical L source fits a contemporary solution in which Mark was the first gospel and Q was a written source for both Matthew and Luke. According to the four-document hypothesis, the author combined Mark, the Q source, and L to produce his gospel. The material in L, like that in M, probably comes from the oral tradition. I. Howard Marshall (1994) stated: "Luke rightly regarded these sources as reliable".

James R. Edwards (2009) equated the L source with the Hebrew Gospel referred to by patristic authors. His thesis has not been accepted by other scholars.

== Contents ==
According to Honoré (1968), the unique material in the third Gospel amounted to 35% of that gospel. Theissen (1998) went further, stating that the special material comprises nearly half of the Gospel of Luke.

L includes the Annunciation, the Visitation, the Lukan account of the virgin birth of Jesus (including the Adoration of the Shepherds, the Circumcision and Presentation of Jesus at the Temple), the Finding in the Temple, many parables of Jesus, and Jesus at Herod's court. Like Matthew's unique source, known as M, the L source has several parables such as the Parable of the Good Samaritan (Luke 10:25–37) and the Parable of the Prodigal Son (Luke 15:11–32).

According to E. Earle Ellis (1999), the L source material exhibits the highest prevalence of Semitisms within the Luke–Acts corpus, so that Semitic sources were probably at the basis of L source verses such as Luke 1:5–2:40; 5:1–11; 7:11–17, 36–50; 8:1–3; 9:51–56; 11:27f.; 13:10–17; 14:1–6; 17:11–19; 19:1–10; 23:50–24:53. By contrast, the portions of the Gospel of Luke that parallel the contents of the Gospel of Mark represented 'a more polished Greek' than Mark's, and show fewer Hebraisms.

== Decline ==
The study of hypothetical pre-Gospel sources is declining in scholarship, with the tendency most visible with the M and L sources. Interest in L and proto-Luke virtually disappeared by the latter half of the twentieth century, though Paffenroth's 1997 monograph renewed interest.

== See also ==
- Authorship of Luke–Acts
- Criterion of multiple attestation
- Mary, mother of Jesus
- M source
- List of Gospels
- Marcion hypothesis
