= Revised Standard Version =

English translation of the Bible

- Full name: Revised Standard Version
- Abbreviation: RSV
- OT published: 1952
- NT published: 1946
- Derived from: American Standard Version
- Textual basis: OT: Biblia Hebraica Stuttgartensia with limited Dead Sea Scrolls and Septuagint influence; Apocrypha: Septuagint with Vulgate influence; NT: Novum Testamentum Graece
- Translation type: Formal equivalence
- Reading level: High school
- Version revision: 1971 (Note: A minor text revision for both the Old Testament and the New Testament was initiated in 1959, taking into account "a study of criticisms and suggestions from various readers." It was completed in 1962, being subsequently included in existing editions. The 1971 text edition (being the second edition) featured a revision of the New Testament.)
- Copyright: 1946, 1952, 1971 (the Apocrypha is copyrighted 1957, 1977) by the Division of Christian Education of the National Council of the Churches of Christ in the USA
- Religious affiliation: Protestant, Ecumenical, with Catholic acceptance since mid-1960s
- Website: rsv.friendshippress.org
- Genesis 1:1–3 In the beginning God created the heavens and the earth. The earth was without form and void, and darkness was upon the face of the deep; and the Spirit of God was moving over the face of the waters. And God said, "Let there be light"; and there was light. John 3:16 For God so loved the world that he gave his only Son, that whoever believes in him should not perish but have eternal life.

The Revised Standard Version (RSV) is an English translation of the Bible published in 1952 by the Division of Christian Education of the National Council of the Churches of Christ in the USA. This translation is a revision of the American Standard Version (ASV) of 1901, and was intended to be a readable and literally accurate modern English translation which aimed to "preserve all that is best in the English Bible as it has been known and used through the years" and "to put the message of the Bible in simple, enduring words that are worthy to stand in the great Tyndale-King James tradition."

The RSV was the first translation of the Bible to make use of the Dead Sea Scroll of Isaiah, a development considered "revolutionary" in the academic field of biblical scholarship. The New Testament was first published in 1946, the Old Testament in 1952, and the Apocrypha in 1957; the New Testament was revised in 1971. The original Revised Standard Version, Catholic Edition (RSV-CE) was published in 1965–66, and the deuterocanonical books were expanded in 1977. The Revised Standard Version, Second Catholic Edition (RSV-2CE) was published in 2006.

In later years, the RSV served as the basis for two revisions—the New Revised Standard Version (NRSV) of 1989, and the English Standard Version (ESV) of 2001.

== Publication and promotion ==
The immediate predecessor to the RSV was the American Standard Version (ASV), published in 1901 by Thomas Nelson & Sons. It was copyrighted to protect the ASV text from unauthorized changes, and that copyright acquired by the International Council of Religious Education, one of the predecessor organizations to the National Council of Churches, which was formed in 1950. In 1928, the Council created a committee charged with creating a new translation based on the ASV, which was considered a somewhat weak and disappointing translation. Luther A. Weigle became its chair and helped find members; the final committee began meeting in 1937 at Yale Divinity School where they did their work.

A number of specially bound presentation copies were given to local public officials in the days prior to the general release. One such presentation copy, the very first copy of the RSV Bible to come off the press, was presented by Weigle to an appreciative President Harry S. Truman on September 26, four days before it was released to the general public.

On September 30, 1952, the RSV Bible was released to the general public. The NCC sponsored a celebratory rally in Washington D.C., with representatives of the churches affiliated with it present. A total of 3,418 interdenominational religious gatherings across North America were held that evening to honor the new version and the translators who made it possible.

== Features ==
There are four key differences between the RSV and its three direct predecessors (the KJV, RV and ASV):

1. The translators reverted to the KJV and RV's practice of translating the Tetragrammaton, or the Divine Name, YHWH. In accordance with the 1611 and 1885 versions, the RSV translated it as "LORD" or "GOD" (depending on whether the Hebrew of the particular verse was read "Adonai" or "Elohim" in Jewish practice), whereas the ASV had translated it "Jehovah".
2. A change was made in the usage of second-person pronouns. The KJV, RV and ASV use the pronouns thou, thee, thy and thine to translate all instances of the second-person singular in the original languages, alongside their associated verb forms (such as art, hast, hadst and didst). The pronoun you and its related forms are used in these translations only to translate the plural. In contrast, the RSV uses only the you forms regardless of number, retaining the older singular thou forms only in address to God (a fairly common practice for Bible translations until the 1970s).
3. The RSV is the first direct revision of the KJV to significantly modernize the language used; for example, the verb ending -eth is replaced by the more contemporary -s to indicate the third-person singular present, some archaic past tense forms such as spake and sware are updated to their modern counterparts (spoke and swore), and the original case distinction between ye and you is removed (the latter being favoured in both nominative and objective cases).
4. For the New Testament, the RSV followed the latest available version of Nestle's Greek text, whereas the RV and ASV had used the Westcott and Hort Greek text, and the KJV had used the Textus receptus.

== Reception and controversy ==
=== Isaiah 7:14 dispute and impact ===
The RSV New Testament was well received, but reactions to the Old Testament were varied and not without controversy. Critics claimed that the RSV translators had translated the Old Testament from a non-Christian perspective. Some critics specifically referred to a Jewish viewpoint, pointing to agreements with the 1917 Jewish Publication Society of America Version Tanakh and the presence on the editorial board of a Jewish scholar, Harry Orlinsky. Such critics further claimed that other views, including those regarding the New Testament, were not considered. The focus of the controversy was the RSV's translation of the Hebrew word עַלְמָה (ʿalmāh) in Isaiah 7:14 as "young woman."

Almah in Hebrew translates as a young woman of childbearing age who had not had children, and so may or may not be a virgin. The Greek language Septuagint written one hundred to three hundred years before Jesus rendered almah as parthenos (παρθένος), which translates as "virgin", and this is the understanding carried over by Christians.

Of the seven appearances of ʿalmāh, the Septuagint translates only two of them as parthenos, "virgin" (including Isaiah 7:14). By contrast, the word בְּתוּלָה (bəṯūlāh) appears some 50 times, and the Septuagint and English translations agree in understanding the word to mean "virgin" in almost every case.

The controversy stemming from this rendering helped reignite the King-James-Only Movement within the Independent Baptist and Pentecostal churches. Furthermore, many Christians have adopted what has come to be known as the "Isaiah 7:14 litmus test", which entails checking that verse to determine whether or not a new translation can be trusted.

=== Protest ===
Some opponents of the RSV took their antagonism beyond condemnation. Luther Hux, a pastor in Rocky Mount, North Carolina, announced his intention to burn a copy of the RSV during a sermon on November 30, 1952. This was reported in the press and attracted shocked reactions, as well as a warning from the local fire chief. On the day in question, he delivered a two-hour sermon entitled "The National Council Bible, the Master Stroke of Satan—One of the Devil's Greatest Hoaxes". After ending the sermon, he led the congregation out of the church, gave each worshipper a small American flag and proceeded to set light to the pages containing Isaiah 7:14. Hux informed the gathered press that he did not burn the Bible, but simply the "fraud" that the Isaiah pages represented. Hux later wrote a tract against the RSV entitled Modernism's Unholy Bible.

The RSV translators linked these events to the life of William Tyndale, an inspiration to them, explaining in their preface: "He met bitter opposition. He was accused of willfully perverting the meaning of the Scriptures, and his New Testaments were ordered to be burned as 'untrue translations.'" But where Tyndale was strangled and then burned at the stake for his work, Bruce Metzger, referring to the pastor who burned the RSV and sent the ashes to Luther Weigle, commented in his book The Bible In Translation: "today it is happily only a copy of the translation that meets such a fate" instead of Bible translators.

== Post-1952 developments ==
=== Catholic Edition ===
In 1965–66, the Catholic Biblical Association adapted, under the editorship of Bernard Orchard O.S.B. and Reginald C. Fuller, the RSV for Catholic use with the release of the Revised Standard Version Catholic Edition (RSV-CE). A revised New Testament was published in 1965, followed by a full RSV Catholic Edition Bible in 1966. The RSV Catholic Edition included revisions up through 1962, a small number of new revisions to the New Testament, mostly to return to familiar phrases, and changes to a few footnotes. It contains the deuterocanonical books of the Old Testament placed in the traditional order of the Vulgate.

=== Second Edition of the New Testament ===
On March 15, 1971, the RSV Bible was re-released with the Second Edition of the translation of the New Testament. Whereas in 1962 the translation panel had merely authorized a handful of changes, in 1971 they gave the New Testament text a thorough editing. This Second Edition incorporated Greek manuscripts not previously available to the RSV translation panel, namely, the Bodmer Papyri, published in 1956–61.

The most obvious changes were the restoration of Mark 16.9-20 (the long ending) and John 7.53-8.11 aka The Pericope Adulterae (in which Jesus forgives an adultress) to the text (in 1946, they were put in footnotes). Also restored was Luke 22.19b-20, containing the bulk of Jesus' institution of the Lord's Supper. In the 1946-52 text, this had been cut off at the phrase, "This is my body", and the rest had only been footnoted, since this verse did not appear in the original Codex Bezae manuscript used by the translation committee.

The description of Christ's ascension in Luke 24:51 had the footnote "...and was carried up into heaven" restored to the text. Luke 22.43-44, which had been part of the text in 1946–52, was relegated to the footnote section because of its questionable authenticity; in these verses an angel appears to Jesus in Gethsemane to strengthen and encourage Him before His arrest and crucifixion. Many other verses were rephrased or rewritten for greater clarity and accuracy. Moreover, the footnotes concerning monetary values were no longer expressed in terms of dollars and cents but in terms of how long it took to earn each coin (e. g., the denarius was no longer defined as twenty cents but as a day's wage). The Book of Revelation, called "The Revelation to John" in the previous editions, was retitled "The Revelation to John (The Apocalypse)".

Some of these changes to the RSV New Testament had already been introduced in the 1965-66 RSV Catholic Edition, and their introduction into the RSV itself was done to pave the way for the publication of the Common Bible in 1973.

The Standard Bible Committee intended to prepare a second edition of the Old Testament, but those plans were scrapped in 1974, when the National Council of Churches voted to authorize a full revision of the RSV.

=== Common Bible ===
The Common Bible of 1973 ordered the books in a way intended to please both Catholics and Protestants. It was divided into four sections:

1. The Old Testament (39 Books)
2. The Catholic Deuterocanonical Books (12 Books)
3. The additional Eastern Orthodox Deuterocanonical Books (three Books; six Books after 1977)
4. The New Testament (27 Books)

=== Reader's Digest Bible ===
In 1982, Reader's Digest published a special edition of the RSV that was billed as a condensed edition of the text. A team of seven editors led by John Evangelist Walsh produced the manuscript. The Reader's Digest edition was intended for those who did not read the Bible or who read it infrequently; it was not intended as a replacement of the full RSV text. In this version, 55% of the Old Testament and 25% of the New Testament were cut. Familiar passages such as the Lord's Prayer, Psalm 23, and the Ten Commandments were retained. For those who wanted the full RSV, Reader's Digest provided a list of publishers that sold the complete RSV at that time.

=== Second Catholic Edition ===
In early 2006, Ignatius Press released the Revised Standard Version, Second Catholic Edition (RSV-2CE). This second edition removed archaic pronouns (thee, thou), and accompanying verb forms (didst, speakest), revised passages used in the lectionary according to the Vatican document Liturgiam authenticam, and elevated some passages out of the RSV footnotes when they favored Catholic renderings, such as replacing "young woman" with "virgin" in Isaiah 7:14.

== Revisions ==
=== New Revised Standard Version ===
In 1989, the National Council of Churches released a full-scale revision to the RSV called the New Revised Standard Version (NRSV). It was the first major version to use gender-neutral language and thus drew more criticism and ire from conservative Christians than did its 1952 predecessor. This criticism largely stemmed from concerns that the modified language obscured phrases in the Old Testament that could be read as messianic prophecies.

=== English Standard Version ===
In 2001, Crossway published the English Standard Version (ESV), its revision of the 1971 text edition of the RSV. In comparison to the RSV, the ESV reverts certain disputed passages to their prior rendering as found in the ASV. (Note: For example, in Isaiah 7:14, "young woman" was reverted to "virgin".) Unlike the NRSV, the ESV, depending on the context, prefers to use gender-inclusive language sparingly.

== Legacy and use today ==
When the New Revised Standard Version (NRSV) was published in 1989, some traditional Christians — both Catholic and Protestant — criticized its wide use of gender-inclusive language. Because of its significance in the development of the English Bible tradition, many publishers and Biblical scholars continue to rely on the RSV tradition in their work, especially when writing for mixed Catholic and Protestant audiences:

[T]he Revised Standard Version of 1946–1957 was becoming established and, in 1966, was accepted by Catholics and Protestants as a 'Common Bible'. It was the first truly ecumenical Bible and brought together the two traditions — the Catholic Douay–Rheims Bible and the Protestant Authorised Version.

Moreover, because of its importance to Anglican heritage and the English Bible tradition, the Revised Standard Version, Second Catholic Edition (RSV-2CE) has been approved for liturgical use in Anglican Use Catholic parishes of the U.S. Pastoral Provision and Personal Ordinariates for former Anglicans around the world. The Personal Ordinariate of Our Lady of Walsingham in the United Kingdom has adopted the RSV-2CE as "the sole lectionary authorized for use" in its liturgies. The RSV is one of the versions authorized to be used in services of the Episcopal Church and the Anglican Communion.

On January 20, 2017, incoming U.S. President Donald Trump took his inaugural oath of office using a copy of the RSV Bible given to him by his mother in 1955 when he graduated from a Presbyterian Sunday School.

== Documentaries ==
In 1999, the National Council of Churches, in association with Odyssey Productions, produced a TV documentary about the making of the RSV — The Bible Under Fire.

== Controversies ==
In 2022, the documentary 1946: The Mistranslation That Shifted Culture explains how the American committee behind the Revised Standard Version Bible first translated two Greek words referring to abusive behavior and exploitative relationships as homosexual in 1946. From then on, other translations, such as the New International Version of the 1970s, decided to use the term “homosexual”, which the film claims propagated social exclusion of homosexuals. The Revised Standard Version translation committee changed the text in 1971, using instead the word “sexual perverts” in the publication of a revision. The documentary also claims that the English translations of other passages are incorrect, such as Leviticus 18:22 which was translated as “Man shall not lie with man, for it is an abomination”, while the same passage taking into account the sacred prostitution context of the time was translated into German: “Man shall not lie with young boys as he does with a woman, for it is an abomination.”
