= David Laird Dungan =

American academic (1936–2008)

David Laird Dungan (10 May 1936 – 30 November 2008) was an American scholar of Christianity. He served as Distinguished Professor of the Humanities and Emeritus Professor of New Testament and Early Christianity at the University of Tennessee, Knoxville. He also was a scholar of the synoptic problem.

== Biography ==
The son of Presbyterian missionaries, Dungan was born in New Haven, Connecticut, and grew up in Shanghai, China until 1940. His family moved back to the United States and he was then raised in Berea, Kentucky, where he graduated high school in 1953. He earned degrees from The College of Wooster (B.A. 1957), McCormick Seminary in Chicago (B.D. 1963), and Harvard Divinity School (Th.D. 1968).

From 1967 to 2002, Dungan was a faculty member in the Department of Religious Studies at the University of Tennessee, Knoxville, teaching courses in Biblical literature, Church history, and images of Jesus. His teaching was interdisciplinary, with courses linking religion to the environmental crisis, and a course in the 1980s on religious legacies of the Vietnam War, in which local veterans served as guest lecturers, sharing their experiences with students. His teaching was inquiry based; according to one colleague, it was designed "to put students in the presence of what is primitive and, far more, pristine about biblical texts," to put students "in the grip of serious uneasiness" with their prior assumptions, and to challenge them to work through dilemmas of faith and scholarship for themselves.

Dungan was a proponent of the two-gospel hypothesis (Griesbach hypothesis), which argues that the Gospel of Mark is derived from the Gospel of Matthew and the Gospel of Luke. This meant he argued against both Markan priority and the necessity of the Q document proposed in the more accepted and common two-source hypothesis. He authored numerous articles and books on the subject, including A History of the Synoptic Problem (Yale University Press, 1999). He was also a founding member of the International Institute for the Renewal of Gospel Studies and a member of the Research Team of the International Institute for Gospel Studies, groups which facilitated and supported Dungan's work.

In 1976-77 and again in 2006, he taught at the invitation of the Pontifical Biblical Institute in Rome. Documents for the Study of the Gospels, which he began co-editing in the 1970s with David R. Cartlidge, is used by scholars and students worldwide. Dungan frequently collaborated with William R. Farmer, one of the main proponents of the two-gospel hypothesis. From 1990 to 1998, he and Farmer co-edited the International Bible Commentary: A Catholic and Ecumenical Commentary for the 21st Century, a collection of commentaries from biblical scholars from diverse Christian traditions worldwide.

At the time of his death, he was working on a multimedia book project entitled Images of Jesus in America. Colleagues have assembled a volume of essays in his honor, which includes an introductory set of essays on his life of teaching and scholarship. The University of Tennessee, Knoxville, has established the David L. Dungan Memorial Lecture Fund to support an annual lecture by a noted scholar on an issue that motivated Dungan's work.

== Publications by David Laird Dungan ==
Books Authored

- Constantine's Bible: Politics and the Making of the New Testament (Augsburg Fortress Publishers, 2006).
- A History of the Synoptic Problem: The Canon, the Text, the Composition, and the Interpretation of the Gospels (Yale University Press, 1999).
- Beyond the Q Impasse: Luke's Use of Matthew: A Demonstration by the Research Team of the International Institute for Gospel Studies, co-authored with Allan J. McNicol, David B. Peabody, Lamar Cope, William R. Farmer, and Philip L. Shuler (Trinity Press International, 1996).
- The Sayings of Jesus in the Churches of Paul: The Use of the Synoptic Tradition in the Regulation of Early Church Life (Philadelphia: Fortress Press; Blackwell Publishers, 1971).

Books Edited

- International Bible Commentary: a Catholic and Ecumenical Commentary for the 21st Century, co-edited with William R. Farmer, Dominique Barrios-Delgado, Armando Levoratti, and Sean McEvenue, English language edition (Liturgical Press, 1998).
- Documents for the Study of the Gospels, co-edited with David R. Cartlidge, revised and expanded edition (Augsburg Fortress Publishers, 1994). Originally published as Sourcebook of Texts for the Comparative Study of the Gospels: Literature of the Hellenistic and Roman Period Illustrating the Milieu and Character of the Gospels, co-edited with David R. Cartlidge, Society of Biblical Literature (Scholars’ Press, 1974).
- The Interrelations of the Gospels: a Symposium Led by M É Boismard, W R Farmer, F Neirynck, Jerusalem 1984, Bibliotheca Ephemeridum Theologicarum Lovaniensium 95 (Louvain, Belgium: Leuven Univ. Pr, 1990; repr. Ithaca, NY: Snow Lion Publications, 2002).

Articles and Essays Authored

- "The Bible and Ecology," co-authored with Dan Deffenbaugh, in International Bible Commentary: a Catholic and Ecumenical Commentary for the 21st Century, edited by William R. Farmer, et al., English language edition (Liturgical Press, 1998).
- "What is the Synoptic Problem?" co-authored with John Kloppenborg, in International Bible Commentary: a Catholic and Ecumenical Commentary for the 21st Century, edited by William R. Farmer, et al., English language edition (Liturgical Press, 1998).
- "'Eppur Si Muove': Circumnavigating the Mythical Recensions of Q," Soundings 78:3-4 (1995): 541-570.
- "The Year of Living Dangerously: An East–West Dialectic," co-authored with Linda Ehrlich, The New Orleans Film Review 19.3-4 (1993): 118-124.
- "The Two Gospel Hypothesis," Anchor Bible Dictionary, vol. 5 (New York: Doubleday 1992), 671-679.
- "Response to the two-source hypothesis," in The Interrelations of the Gospels: a Symposium Led by M É Boismard, W R Farmer, F Neirynck, Jerusalem 1984, Bibliotheca Ephemeridum Theologicarum Lovaniensium 95 (Louvain, Belgium: Leuven Univ. Pr, 1990; repr. Ithaca, NY: Snow Lion Publications, 2002), 201-216.
- "Synopses of the Future," in The Interrelations of the Gospels: a Symposium Led by M É Boismard, W R Farmer, F Neirynck, Jerusalem 1984, Bibliotheca Ephemeridum Theologicarum Lovaniensium 95 (Louvain, Belgium: Leuven Univ. Pr, 1990; repr. Ithaca, NY: Snow Lion Publications, 2002), 317-347.
- "Jesus and Violence," in Jesus, the Gospels, and the Church. Essays in Honor of William R. Farmer, edited by E. P. Sanders (Mercer University Press, 1987), 135 –162.
- "Critique of the Main Arguments for Mark's Priority as Formulated by B. H. Streeter," in The Two-Source Hypothesis: a Critical Appraisal, edited by Arthur J. Bellinzoni, Jr., Joseph B. Tyson, and William O. Walker (Mercer Univ. Press, 1985; repr. Ithaca, NY: Snow Lion Publications, 2002), 143-161.
- "Critique of the Q Hypothesis," in The Two-Source Hypothesis: a Critical Appraisal, edited by Arthur J. Bellinzoni, Jr., Joseph B. Tyson, and William O. Walker (Mercer Univ. Press, 1985; repr. Ithaca, NY: Snow Lion Publications, 2002), 427-433.
- "Synopses of the Future," Biblica 66 (1985) 457–492.
- "A Griesbachian Perspective on the Argument from Order," in Synoptic Studies: The Ampleforth Conferences of 1982 and 1983, edited by Christopher M. Tuckett, Journal for the Study of the New Testament Supplement Series #7 (Sheffield, England: Sheffield Academic Press 1984; repr. Ithaca, NY: Snow Lion Publications, 2002), 67-74.
- "The Purpose and Provenance of the Gospel of Mark According to the 'Two Gospel' ([Owen-]Griesbach) Hypothesis," in Colloquy on New Testament Studies: a Time for Reappraisal and Fresh Approaches, edited by Bruce C. Corley (Mercer Univ. Press, 1983; repr. Ithaca, NY: Snow Lion Publications, 2002), 133-179. Repr. in New Synoptic Studies: the Cambridge Gospel Conference and Beyond, edited by William R. Farmer (Mercer Uni. Press, 1983; repr. Ithaca, NY: Snow Lion Publications, 2002), 411-440.
- "Theory of Synopsis Construction," Biblica 61 (1980): 305–329.
- "Survey of Nineteenth Century ‘Lives of Jesus’," Religious Studies Review (Oct. 1978): 113–127.
- "Lives of Jesus Series," review article co-written with James O. Duke, Religious Studies Review 4.4 (1978): 259-265.
- "Albert Schweitzer’s Disillusionment with the Historical Reconstruction of the Life of Jesus," in Perkins Journal 29 (1976): 27–48.
- "Reconsidering Albert Schweitzer," Christian Century 92.32 (8 Oct. 1975): 874-880.
- "New Testament Canon in Recent Study," Interpretation 29.4 (1975): 339-351.
- "Reactionary Trends in the Gospel Producing Activity of the Early Church: Marcion, Tatian, Mark," in L’évangile du Marc, Bibliotheca Ephemeridum Theologicarum Lovaniensium #34, edited by M. Sabbe (Louvain Univ. Press 1974), 179–202.
- "Mark the Abridgment of Matthew and Luke," in Jesus and Man’s Hope, vol. I, edited by D. Miller (Pittsburgh Theological Seminary Press, 1970), 51–79. Repr. in The Two Source Hypothesis: A Critical Appraisal, edited by A. Bellinzoni (Mercer University Press, 1985).
