= Eta Linnemann =

German theologian

Eta Linnemann (October 19, 1926 in Osnabrück – 9 May 2009 in Leer (Ostfriesland)) was a German Protestant theologian. In her last years, she broke completely with the theology of her teacher Rudolf Bultmann.

== Life ==
Eta Linnemann studied Protestant theology in Marburg, Tübingen and Göttingen from October 1948 to July 1953. She passed her first and second state examinations in August 1953 and in August 1957, respectively. The Evangelical Lutheran Church of Hanover commissioned Linnemann to write interpretations of biblical texts for religious education. From this work arose her dissertation on the parables of Jesus - Gleichnisse Jesu, Einführung und Auslegung - with which she was promoted to a doctor of theology summa cum laude in July 1961 at the Church University Berlin-Zehlendorf.

Between 1961 and 1966 she taught at the seminar for church service in Berlin-Zehlendorf, in 1967 she was appointed as visiting professor at Braunschweig University of Technology. In February 1970, Eta Linnemann worked in Marburg with Rudolf Bultmann and Ernst Fuchs on studies on the Passion story. On 10 August 1971, she was awarded an honorary professorship of New Testament at the Theological Faculty of the Philipps-University Marburg. The following year, the Braunschweig University of Technology appointed her to the chair of theology and methodology of religious education. Linnemann was a member of the international society Studiorum Novi Testamenti Societas.

Following a conversion experience in 1977, Linnemann caused a stir in 1978 when she renounced the historical-critical method in 1978 and asked readers to destroy her previous publications. From 1983, at the age of 60, she departed Germany for Indonesia to train pastors at the Theological University of the Indonesian Mission community in Batu. In 2007, she cited Ernst Käsemann and an unnamed ear witness, that Rudolf Bultmann on his death bed had recanted his critical views.

Eta Linnemann lived her last years in the Loga district of Leer.

== Influence ==
Linnemann rejected Markan priority and favored the Independence View of the synoptic gospels. One of Linnemann's views to find support among conservative English speaking scholarship, notably F. David Farnell, was her rejection of a Q (source) for the synoptic Gospels in favour of an explanation following the Jewish requirement of Deuteronomy 19:15 that "on the evidence of two or three witnesses a matter shall be confirmed".

== Selected publications ==
- Bibel oder Bibelkritik? (The Bible or biblical criticism?), Nuremberg 2007
- Historical Criticism of the Bible: Methodology or Ideology? Reflections of a Bultmannian Turned Evangelical, (translated by Robert W Yarbrough), Grand Rapids 2001, Kregel Publications, ISBN 978-0-8254-3095-4
- Gibt es ein synoptisches Problem? (Is there a synoptic problem?), Nuremberg 1999, 4 revised edition. 3rd edition translated into English.
- Wissenschaft oder Meinung? (Science or opinion?), Nuremberg 1999, 2 extended edition
- Bibelkritik auf dem Prüfstand. (Biblical criticism to the test), Nuremberg 1998, 1 Edition
- Studien zur Passionsgeschichte. (Studies on the Passion story), Göttingen, 1970
- Gleichnisse Jesu - Einführung und Auslegung. (The Parables of Jesus - introduction and interpretation), Göttingen 1964, 3rd enlarged edition
