= Lectionary 29 =

Lectionary ℓ 29
- New Testament manuscript
- Text: Evangelistarion †
- Date: 12th-century
- Script: Greek
- Now at: Bodleian Library
- Size: 25.5 cm by 20 cm
- Hand: elegantly written

Lectionary 29, designated by siglum ℓ 29 (in the Gregory-Aland numbering), is a Greek manuscript of the New Testament on parchment. Palaeographically it has been assigned to the 12th-century.

== Description ==
The codex contains lessons from the Gospels of John, Matthew, and Luke (Evangelistarium), with lacunae. It is written in Greek minuscule letters, on 156 parchment leaves (25.5 cm by 20 cm), 2 columns per page, 23 lines per page. It contains musical notes. The manuscript is "elegantly written but much worn".

== History ==
The codex was merely examined by Griesbach. C. R. Gregory saw it in 1883.

The manuscript is not cited in the critical editions of the Greek New Testament (UBS3).

Currently the codex is located in the Bodleian Library (Auct. D. inf. 2. 15) in Oxford.

== See also ==
- List of New Testament lectionaries
- Biblical manuscript
- Textual criticism

== Bibliography ==
- Gregory, Caspar René (1900). Textkritik des Neuen Testaments. Vol. 1. Leipzig: J.C. Hinrichs. p. 390.
