= Lectionary 21 =

Lectionary ℓ 21
- New Testament manuscript
- Text: Evangelistarion
- Date: 14th-century
- Script: Greek
- Now at: Bodleian Library
- Size: 24 cm by 19.5 cm
- Hand: coarsely written

Lectionary 21, designated by siglum ℓ 21 (in the Gregory-Aland numbering), is a Greek manuscript of the New Testament on vellum leaves. Palaeographically it has been assigned to the 14th-century.

== Description ==
The codex contains lessons from the Gospels of Matthew, Luke lectionary (Evangelistarium), with numerous lacunae. It has not lessons from Gospel of John. It is written in Greek minuscule letters, on 59 parchment leaves (24 cm by 19.5 cm), 2 columns per page, 28 lines per page. The leaves follow in the order 1–3, 15, 4-11, 16. The manuscript is "coarsely written".

== History ==
Formerly it was known as Codex Seldeni 4. It was added to the list of the New Testament manuscripts by Wettstein. The codex was examined by Mill (as Seld. 4) and Griesbach. C. R. Gregory saw it in 1883.

The manuscript is sporadically cited in the critical editions of the Greek New Testament (UBS3).

Currently the codex is located in the Bodleian Library (Arch. Selden. B. 56) in Oxford.

== See also ==
- List of New Testament lectionaries
- Biblical manuscript
- Textual criticism

== Bibliography ==
- Gregory, Caspar René (1900). Textkritik des Neuen Testaments. Vol. 1. Leipzig: J.C. Hinrichs. p. 389.
