= Reginald Fuller =

Reginald Fuller may refer to:

- Reginald C. Fuller (1908–2011), English biblical scholar, ecumenist, and Roman Catholic priest
- Reginald H. Fuller (1915–2007), Anglo-American biblical scholar, ecumenist, and Anglican priest
