= Luther A. Weigle =

American minister (1880–1976)

Luther Allan Weigle (September 11, 1880 – September 2, 1976) was an American Protestant religious scholar and educator who served as dean of Yale Divinity School. He is most known for leading the committee that created the Revised Standard Version (RSV) translation of the Bible. He was active in the ecumenical movement that sought to find common ground between different Christian denominations. He was a founding member of the Association of Theological Schools (ATS) and served on its board for decades.

== Biography ==
Luther Weigle was born on September 11, 1880, in Littlestown, Pennsylvania, the son of Rev. Elias Daniel Weigle, a Lutheran pastor, and Hannah Bream Weigle. He attended nearby Gettysburg College, graduating in 1900. He then studied at the affiliated Gettysburg Lutheran seminary, and he was ordained as a Lutheran pastor by the Allegheny Synod in 1903. During his studies, he learned Koine Greek, the language the New Testament is written in. He attended Yale University in New Haven, Connecticut, for graduate school, where he earned his PhD in 1905.

In 1905, he was appointed a professor of philosophy at Carleton College in Minnesota. He served as a dean from 1909–1914. He also wrote his first book, The Pupil and the Teacher, in 1911, a curriculum intended for Sunday schools most churches operated. It applied then-recent developments in psychology to Christian education. The book was popular and sold well in Protestant circles. In 1916, he took a job offer back at Yale. He also transferred his ministership to the Congregational church, which was then affiliated with Yale and what its ministers were expected to join. He wrote he kept a Lutheran theology, but admired the Congregationalists for being welcoming regardless. He was appointed dean of the Yale Divinity School, and served in that position from 1928 to 1949. There, he made Yale a more prestigious if choosier seminary that insisted on high standards for its students. During his tenure, Yale also admitted women to seminary for the first time, in 1932. He retired from his seminary post in 1949.

Weigle was a member of the ecumenical movement that felt that the doctrinal differences that traditionally divided various Christian denominations were not actually that significant and should not interfere with cross-Christian unity. He worked with various cross-denominational initiatives, creating Christian organizations that weren't tied to one specific denomination. From 1941 to 1950, he was the chairman of the committee that would eventually merge the Federal Council of Churches with various other organizations to create the National Council of Churches. He was also a leader in establishing the World Council of Churches in 1948. He also held influential roles within the World Sunday School Association and the International Council of Religious Education.

Weigle opined on the secular American education system as well. He testified as an expert witness in Abington School District v. Schempp that Bible-reading in a public school could have a secular purpose and would not violate the separation of church and state. He generally considered that the 1st Amendment was intended to disallow government favoritism of any one particular denomination or sect, but that common Christian elements should usually be permissible. He was opposed to the Supreme Court decisions that restricted school prayer in the United States in 1962 and 1963, and favored a constitutional amendment to allow it more broadly.

Weigle's wife Clara Rosetta Boxrud died in 1964. Weigle himself died on September 2, 1976, in New Haven from medical complications after a fall. The couple was survived by 4 children and 20 grandchildren as of 1976.

== Revised Standard Version ==
The work Weigle is best-remembered for is his work as chairman of the committee of 22 scholars that produced the Revised Standard Version, a new translation of the Bible. He was appointed to the committee in 1928. At the time, the 1901 American Standard Version (ASV) was considered something of a disappointment, and many English-speaking churches continued to use the King James Version (KJV) of the Bible. The National Council of Churches sought to find a new translation in 20th-century English that maintained the beauty of the KJV, avoided the somewhat stilted language of the ASV, and took into account the various discoveries of ancient manuscripts of Biblical works in the 19th and 20th century. The work took years, with the final committee meeting and starting its new translation in 1937 at the Yale Divinity School. The revised New Testament published in 1946, the revised Old Testament in 1952, and the revised Apocrypha published in 1957.

For the most part, the RSV was well-received, and sold millions of copies. Weigle devoted much of his time to articles, interviews, and other promotion of the RSV. Its main and initial market was Protestants, but a slightly modified Catholic Edition was created by Catholic scholars (RSV-CE) as well as an Orthodox-approved version once the Apocyrpha was translated. The RSV did attract controversy. Weigle had performed an unusual act among Christian translators of the Bible - he had invited Harry Orlinsky, a practicing Jew, to participate in the translation committee, given Orlinsky's deep knowledge of the Biblical Hebrew language, the Jewish scriptures, and ancient Hebrew literature. The RSV translated Isaiah 7:14 as a reference to a "young woman" shall conceive, as the usual translation of the Hebrew word almah. The committee doesn't seem to have realized the choice would be scrutinized more than any other passage, but this translation saw sharp criticism among certain conservatives. They blamed Orlinsky and attacked the RSV as a Jewish, modernist, or even communist translation of the Old Testament. Weigle personally defended Orlinsky and his contributions from criticism. He was later called to testify before Congress in 1960 after an Air Force manual claimed the RSV was created by communist "fellow travelers". He defended himself against charges of communism, describing himself as a "Republican in politics, a Lutheran in theology, and a Congregationalist in affiliation."

== Selected works ==
As author

- Weigle, L. A. (1911). The Pupil and the Teacher. Philadelphia: The United Lutheran Publication House. (New edition, 1929).
- Weigle, L. A., & Hallam, H. (1919). Training the Devotional Life. Boston: Pilgrim Press.
- Weigle, L. A. (1920). Talks to Sunday School Teachers. New York: Doran.
- Weigle, L. A. (1920). The Training of Children in the Christian Family. Boston, Chicago: The Pilgrim Press.
- Weigle, L. A. (1928). American Idealism (Vol. X). The Pageant of America. New Haven, Yale University Press.
- Weigle, L. A. (1937). We are able. New York: Harper & Brothers.
- Weigle, L. A. (1939). Jesus and the Educational Method. New York, Cincinnati: The Abingdon Press.
- Weigle, L. A. (1949). The English New Testament from Tyndale to the Revised Standard Version. New York: Abingdon-Cokesbury Press.
- Weigle, L. A. (1956). The Living Word: Some Bible words explained. New York: Thomas Nelson & Sons.
- Weigle, L. A., & Bridges, R. (1960). The Bible Word Book: Concerning obsolete or archaic words in the King James version of the Bible. New York: Thomas Nelson & Sons.

As editor

- Bushnell, Horace. (1916). Christian Nurture. New York: Charles Scribner's Sons. (Reprinted in 1947)
- The New Testament Octapla: Eight English versions of the New Testament in the Tyndale-King James tradition (1962). New York: Thomas Nelson & Sons.
- The Genesis Octapla: Eight English versions of the Bible in the Tyndale-King James tradition (1965). New York: Thomas Nelson & Sons.
