= Matthaean priority =

Matthaean priority is the proposition that the Gospel of Matthew was the first gospel written of the three synoptic gospels. It may refer to:

- Augustinian hypothesis, that the Gospel of Matthew was written first, Mark was based on Matthew, and Luke was based on both Matthew and Mark
- Two-gospel hypothesis, that the Gospel of Matthew was written first, Luke was based on Matthew, and Mark was based on both Matthew and Luke

== See also ==
- Synoptic problem
