= Marcan priority =

Hypothesis about Christian Bible Gospel of Mark

Theory Information
- Order: Mark; Luke, Matt

Theory History
- Originator: Gottlob Christian Storr
- Origination Date: 1786
- Proponents: Christian Gottlob Wilke, Christian Hermann Weisse, Heinrich Julius Holtzmann, J. C. Hawkins
- Opponents: B. C. Butler, William R. Farmer

Marcan priority (or Markan priority) is the hypothesis that the Gospel of Mark was the first of the three synoptic gospels to be written, and was used as a source by the other two (Matthew and Luke). It is a central element in discussion of the synoptic problem—the question of the documentary relationship among these three gospels.

Most scholars since the late 19th century have accepted the concept of Marcan priority. Others support either different forms of Marcan priority or reject it altogether. It forms the foundation for the widely accepted two-source theory.

== History ==
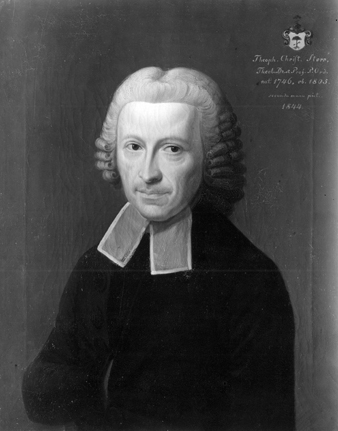
Gottlob Christian Storr

The tradition handed down by the Church Fathers regarded Matthew as the first Gospel written in Hebrew, which was later used as a source by Mark and Luke. It is seen as early as in Irenaeus's book Against Heresies. Augustine of Hippo wrote in the 5th century: "Now, those four evangelists whose names have gained the most remarkable circulation over the whole world, and whose number has been fixed as four, ...are believed to have written in the order which follows: first Matthew, then Mark, thirdly Luke, lastly John." And: "Of these four, it is true, only Matthew is reckoned to have written in the Hebrew language; the others in Greek. And however they may appear to have kept each of them a certain order of narration proper to himself, this certainly is not to be taken as if each individual writer chose to write in ignorance of what his predecessor had done...".

This view of Gospel origins, however, began to be challenged in the late 18th century, when Gottlob Christian Storr proposed in 1786 that Mark was the first to be written.

Storr's idea met with little acceptance at first, with most scholars favoring either Matthaean priority, under the traditional Augustinian hypothesis or the Griesbach hypothesis, or a fragmentary theory (according to which, stories about Jesus were recorded in several smaller documents and notebooks and combined by the evangelists to create the Synoptic Gospels). Working within the fragmentary theory, Karl Lachmann in 1835 compared the Synoptic Gospels in pairs and noted that, while Matthew frequently agreed with Mark against Luke in the order of passages and Luke agreed frequently with Mark against Matthew, Matthew and Luke rarely agreed with each other against Mark. Lachmann inferred from this that Mark best preserved a relatively fixed order of episodes in Jesus's ministry.

In 1838, two theologians, Christian Gottlob Wilke and Christian Hermann Weisse, independently extended Lachmann's reasoning to conclude that Mark not only best represented Matthew and Luke's source but also that Mark was Matthew and Luke's source. Their ideas were not immediately accepted, but Heinrich Julius Holtzmann's endorsement in 1863 of a qualified form of Marcan priority won general favor.

There was much debate at the time over whether Matthew and Luke used Mark itself or some Proto-Mark (Ur-Mark). In 1899 J. C. Hawkins took up the question with a careful statistical analysis and argued for Marcan priority without Proto-Mark, and other British scholars soon followed to strengthen the argument, which then received wide acceptance.

Most scholars in the 20th century regarded Marcan priority as no longer a hypothesis but an established fact. Still, fresh challenges from B. C. Butler and William R. Farmer proved influential in reviving the rival hypothesis of Matthaean priority, and recent decades have seen scholars less certain about Marcan priority and more eager to explore all the alternatives.

== Dependent hypotheses ==
The two-source hypothesis, one of several built upon Marcan priority, holds that a hypothetical document (the Q source) was used as a source by Matthew and Luke independently.

If Marcan priority is accepted, the next logical question is how to explain the extensive material, some 200 verses, shared between Matthew and Luke but not found at all in Mark—the double tradition. Furthermore, there are hundreds of instances where Matthew and Luke parallel Mark's account but agree against Mark in minor differences—the minor agreements. Different answers to this question give rise to different synoptic hypotheses.

- The most widely accepted hypothesis is the two-source hypothesis, that Matthew and Luke each independently drew from both Mark and another hypothetical source, which scholars have termed the Q source. This Q, then, was the origin of the double-tradition material, and many of the minor agreements are instances where both Matthew and Luke followed Q's version of a passage rather than Mark's.
- The foremost alternative hypothesis under Marcan priority is the Farrer hypothesis, which postulates that Mark was written first, then Matthew expanded on the text of Mark, and Luke used both Mark and Matthew as source documents (Mark → Matthew → Luke). The double tradition is then simply portions of Matthew that Luke chose to repeat, so there is no need for Q.
- A hybrid of these two hypotheses is the three-source hypothesis, which posits three sources for Luke: Mark, Q, and Matthew.
- The Matthean Posteriority hypothesis is similar to the Farrer hypothesis but has Matthew using Luke as a source (Mark → Luke → Matthew), rather than vice versa. This hypothesis has found a resurgence of support during the 2010s and has entered the mainstream of scholarship. (Note: Andrejevs, Joseph, Lupieri, and Verheyden: "In hindsight, it now seems clear that the emergence of the MPH will be cited as one of, if not the defining feature of the 2010s as far as the synoptic studies are concerned…With the highest number of pro- and MPH-leaning contributions published by various authors in one place to date (Garrow, Huggins, Lupieri, MacEwen, Saulina, Tripp), this volume will likely be remembered as the moment the MPH crossed into the mainstream of synoptic studies. Thereby its theorists have made good on the momentum the MPH somewhat unexpectedly generated in the 2010s.")
- A final hypothesis holds that Matthew and Luke have no literary relationship beyond their dependence on Mark, but rather each supplemented the triple tradition with oral sources. Where these oral sources overlapped with each other, the double tradition arose, and where they overlapped also with Mark, minor agreements arose. This hypothesis, with few supporters, is usually viewed as a variation on the two-source hypothesis, where Q is not a document but a body of oral material, and thus called the oral Q hypothesis.

== Alternatives ==
The Two-Gospel (Griesbach) theory, an alternative to Marcan priority, holds that Mark used Matthew and Luke as sources.

Marcan posteriority states that Mark's correspondence with other synoptics was due to Mark taking from them. The view of the Church Fathers such as Augustine was that the order in the New Testament was also the order of publication and inspiration – Matthew, then Mark, then Luke, then John. This is usually called the Augustinian hypothesis. A modern tweak of this view that maintains Matthaean priority is the two-gospel (Griesbach) hypothesis which holds that Mark used both Matthew and Luke as a source (thus, in order, Matthew—Luke—Mark). This view envisions a Mark who mostly collected the common material shared between Matthew and Luke.

Lucan priority has been revived in recent decades in the complex form of the Jerusalem school hypothesis, which also places Mark in the middle. Here, Mark uses Luke, then Matthew uses Mark but not Luke, while all three Synoptics draw from a hypothetical Greek translation of an earlier Hebrew work.

Some theories deny literary priority to any one of the Synoptic Gospels, asserting that, whatever their chronological order of composition, none of them draws from any of the others. The multi-source hypothesis has each synoptic gospel combining a distinct mix of earlier documents, while the independence hypothesis denies any documentary relationship and regards each gospel as an original composition utilizing oral sources only.

Some variations on Marcan priority propose an additional revision of Mark—a Proto-Mark (Ur-Mark) if earlier than the canonical Gospel, or a Deutero-Mark if later—serving as a source for Matthew and/or Luke.

== Evidence ==
Arguments for Marcan priority are usually made in contrast to its main rival, Matthaean priority, bringing into focus the question of whether Matthew was a source for Mark or vice versa. The evidence supporting Marcan priority is entirely internal.

Many lines of evidence point to Mark having some sort of special place in the relationship among the Synoptics, as the "middle term" between Matthew and Luke. But this could mean that Mark is the common source of the other two (priority), or that it derives from both (posteriority), or even that it is an intermediary in transmission from one to the other—in other words, many such arguments can support both Marcan priority and its rivals. Famously, the so-called "Lachmann fallacy", concerning the order of pericopae in Mark, was once used to argue for Marcan priority but is now seen as a largely neutral observation.

Modern arguments for or against Marcan priority tend to center on redactional plausibility, asking, for example, whether it is more reasonable that Matthew and Luke could have written as they did with Mark in hand, or that Mark could have written as he did with Matthew and Luke in hand, and whether any coherent rationale can be discerned underlying the redactional activity of the later evangelists.

Where matters of detailed wording are concerned, there is some uncertainty in the Gospel texts themselves, as textual criticism of the gospels is still an active field, which cannot even decide, for example, on Mark's original ending. Such issues often intersect with the synoptic problem; for example, B. H. Streeter famously dismissed many of the "minor agreements" so troublesome for the two-source theory by appealing to textual corruption driven typically by harmonization.

=== Marcan style ===
Mark's style of Greek is unique among the Gospels. Some scholars have argued that Mark's style is unsophisticated and unrefined or awkward. But others find Mark's Greek very dense and detailed. Mark is full of Latinisms, in idioms and vocabulary. Mark tends to conjoin verbs and sentences with καὶ (kai, "and"); in fact, more than half the verses in Mark begin with καὶ. Mark is also notably fond of εὐθὺς (euthùs, "immediately") and πάλιν (pálin, "again"), frequently uses dual expressions, and often prefers the historical present. In essence, then, Mark's style is not so much literary as thoroughly colloquial.

The parallel passages in Matthew and especially in Luke tend to be in a more polished and eloquent style of literary Greek. Where Mark uses an unusual word or expression, Matthew and Luke often substitute something more natural. Though they often add material of substance, they tend to trim down Mark's redundancies and verbosity and express his meaning more concisely.

Supporters of Marcan priority see this as Matthew and Luke improving the style of the material they incorporate from Mark. Supporters of Marcan posteriority, however, see Mark as recasting material from Matthew and Luke in his own peculiar style, less like lofty literature and more in a vivid, fast-moving style befitting oral preaching.

=== Content not present in Mark ===
Mark's gospel is by far the shortest, just over half the length of Luke, and omits much found in Matthew and Luke. In fact, while the majority of Mark is included in the other two Synoptics, the additional material shared between Matthew and Luke only is quite extensive.

While Marcan priority easily sees Matthew and Luke building upon Mark by adding new material, Marcan posteriority must explain some surprising omissions. Mark has no infancy narrative nor any version of the Lord's Prayer, for example.

Nor does Mark have more than a handful of unique pericopes. This is expected under Marcan priority, where Matthew has reused nearly everything he found in Mark, but if Mark was written last, it is harder to explain why so little new material was added.

However, Mark's selection of material must be explained in either case, unless it is to be believed that the author of Mark knew nothing more about Jesus than what was written in Mark. Bauckham argues that Mark's content is limited to what Peter himself had witnessed, or at least learned from trusted associates. Powers argues that Mark's purpose is fundamentally kerygmatic, needing to hold the attention of outsiders hearing the Gospel preached for the first time, and so focuses on who Jesus was and what he did, eschewing the sort of lengthy teachings that dominate the double tradition and most of Special Matthew. So, with Mark's selection process better understood, these omissions per se are no longer viewed as such compelling evidence for Marcan priority.

=== Content found only in Mark ===
There are very few passages in Mark with no parallel in either Matthew or Luke, which makes them all the more significant:

- The parable of the growing seed
- The healing of the deaf mute of Decapolis
- The healing of the blind man of Bethsaida
- The naked fugitive

If Mark is drawn from Matthew and Luke, it is hard to see why so little material would be added, if anything were going to added at all, and the choice of additions is also rather strange. On the other hand, if Mark was written first, it is easier to see why Matthew and Luke would omit these passages. These two healings are the only ones in the Synoptics involving the use of saliva (but cf. the healing of the man born blind in John 9), and the naked runaway is an obscure incident with no obvious meaning or purpose. (Note: Mark 14:52 may be an allusion to Amos 2:16 "And he who is stout of heart among the mighty shall flee away naked in that day,' says the LORD.")

This does not tell the whole story, for altogether Mark has (depending on the method of counting) about 155 verses included in neither Matthew nor Luke—nearly a quarter of the entire Gospel of Mark. Most of these are details omitted in the parallel passages, rather than distinct pericopes. In fact, apart from sayings material, nearly every pericope in Mark is longer than its parallels in Matthew and Luke. An illustrative example is the calming of the storm:

Mt 8:23–25	Lk 8:22–24	Mk 4:35–38
As he got into the boat, his disciples followed him. And a great storm developed on the sea so that the waves began to swamp the boat. But he was asleep. So they came and woke him up saying, "Lord, save us! We are about to die!"	One day Jesus got into a boat with his disciples and said to them, "Let's go across to the other side of the lake." So they set out, and as they sailed he fell asleep. Now a violent windstorm came down on the lake, and the boat started filling up with water, and they were in danger. They came and woke him, saying, "Master, Master, we are about to die!"	On that day, when evening came, Jesus said to his disciples, "Let's go across to the other side." So after leaving the crowd, they took him along, just as he was, in the boat, and other boats were with him. Now a great windstorm developed and the waves were breaking into the boat, so that the boat was nearly swamped. But he was in the stern, sleeping on a cushion. They woke him up and said to him, "Teacher, don't you care that we are about to die?"

Mark's unique details tend to be, by necessity, non-essential ones. Marcan priority sees Matthew and Luke trimming away trivial narrative details in favor of the extensive material they wished to add elsewhere. But under Marcan posteriority, these details must have been added to Mark to make the stories more vivid and clear. In either case, Mark must have had an independent source (traditionally, Peter) spanning nearly the entire Gospel; but if so, Marcan posteriority requires a complex and skillful weaving together of this source with both Matthew and Luke, even within individual sentences, which would have been a challenging task.

=== Hard readings ===
Often the differences in Mark from the parallels in Matthew and Luke are "hard readings" (Lectio Difficilior), which seem to portray Jesus or the apostles in a negative light or in ways that a later redactor would likely find uncongenial. Marcan priority argues that these hard readings were more likely original to Mark and then smoothed out or omitted when Matthew and Luke encountered them, rather than added by Mark to accounts lacking them.

Notable hard readings unique to Mark include:

- "He was not able to do a miracle there, except to lay his hands on a few sick people and heal them. And he was amazed because of their unbelief." (Mk 6:5–6), vs. "He did not do many miracles there because of their unbelief." (Mt 13:58).
- Jesus "healed many who were sick" (Mk 1:34), vs. "all who were sick" (Mt 8:16; Lk 4:40).
- "When his family heard this they went out to restrain him, for they said, 'He is out of his mind.'" (Mk 3:21 uniquely).
- In the storm at sea, the disciples ask, "Don't you care that we are about to die?" (Mk 4:38), vs. "We are about to die!" (Mt 8:25; Lk 8:24). Jesus replies, "Do you still have no faith?" (Mk 4:40), vs. "ye of little faith" (Mt 8:26) or "Where is your faith?" (Lk 8:25).
- The disciples' "hearts were hardened" (Mk 6:52, 8:17–18 uniquely).
- James and John ask to sit beside Jesus in his kingdom (Mk 10:35), vs. their mother making the request (Mt 20:20).
- A hungry Jesus curses a fig tree for lacking fruit (Mark 11:12–14). One scholar notes this not only appears self-serving, but also irrational, as Mark adds that "it was not the season for figs." In contrast, Matthew 21:18–22 interprets the incident as a miracle that shows the power of faith.

Marcan posteriority faces the harder task of accounting for these as Marcan changes, but does so by appealing to Mark's fondness for vivid detail and for starkly contrasting Jesus' teachings with the attitudes of those around him.

=== Order ===
Comparing the sequential order of parallel pericopes among the three Synoptics, the arrangement often varies, but some general patterns emerge. Mark nearly always follows Matthew and Luke where they agree in order and one or the other when they disagree. On the other hand, the double tradition pericopae shared between Matthew and Luke show little agreement in order.

Such observations have been studied in detail for centuries, but the difficulty has been in how to interpret them. Marcan priority views this order as support for Matthew and Luke each building upon Mark; Marcan posteriority, however, sees this order as proof that Mark drew alternately from Matthew and Luke. Even the Augustinian hypothesis can see Mark adapting Matthew's order, then Luke adapting Mark's order.

=== Dualisms ===
Mark displays a special fondness for "dualisms" of various kinds, one of which is repeating essentially the same thing in two adjacent phrases. In a majority of cases, the parallel passages in Matthew and Luke, if any, echo only one of the two, and it often happens that Matthew chooses one and Luke chooses the other. Some prominent examples:

- "When it was evening, after sunset" vs "When it was evening" + "As the sun was setting"
- "the leprosy left him and he was cleansed" vs "the leprosy left him" + "his leprosy was cleansed"
- "the word that was sown in them" vs "the word from their hearts" + "what was sown in his heart"
- "They came to Jericho. As Jesus and his disciples and a large crowd were leaving Jericho" vs "As Jesus approached Jericho" + "As they were leaving Jericho, a large crowd followed them"
- "immediately as you enter it" vs "immediately" + "as you enter it"
- "were seeking how to seize him by stealth and kill him" vs "were seeking how they might put him to death" + "conspired to seize Jesus by stealth and kill him"
- "Now on the first day of the feast of Unleavened Bread, when the Passover lamb is sacrificed" vs "Now on the first day of the feast of Unleavened Bread" + "Then came the day for the feast of Unleavened Bread, on which the Passover lamb had to be sacrificed"
- "today, on this night" vs "today" + "this very night"
- "Now when evening had already come, since it was the day of preparation" (that is, the day before the Sabbath) vs "Now when it was evening" + "It was the day of preparation and the Sabbath was beginning"

Supporters of Marcan posteriority advance these as clear cases of Mark conflating the parallel accounts from Matthew and Luke. Supporters of Marcan priority, on the other hand, point to a larger number of instances where both Matthew and Luke have chosen the same half of a Marcan dualism and argue that, when each gospel trimmed down these redundant expressions, sometimes by chance Matthew and Luke made opposite choices.

Riley observes when Matthew has one or both halves of a Marcan dualism, it usually occurs where Matthew and Mark are following the same sequence; when Luke has one or both halves of a Marcan dualism, it always occurs where Luke and Mark are following the same sequence. This is expected under Marcan posteriority, assuming the Marcan account can more easily refer to Matthew from memory, but more difficult to explain under Marcan priority.

=== Editorial fatigue ===
Goodacre lists a number of occasions where it appears that Matthew or Luke begin by altering Mark, but become fatigued and lapse into copying Mark directly, even when doing so is inconsistent with the changes they have already made. Alan Kirk, on the other hand, questions the idea that Matthew and Luke had a deficient concentration. Rather than redacting visually the evangelists used their memories to copy passages from Mark. Kirk argues that such skillful writers should not be accused of carelessness, and the instances of fatigue can be explained as a living reactualization of their sources.

For example, Matthew is more precise than Mark in the titles he gives to rulers, and initially gives Herod Antipas the correct title of "tetrarch", yet he lapses into calling him "king" at a later verse, apparently because he was copying Mark at that point.

Another example is Luke's version of the Parable of the Sower, regarding the seed sown on rocky ground, where Luke omits several elements of the parable, but then follows Mark in the parable's interpretation. Luke says merely that the seed withered for lack of moisture and does not mention the seed springing up quickly, nor the lack of roots, nor being scorched by the sun; yet these omissions remain in the interpretation as, respectively, receiving the word with joy, having no firm root, and the time of temptation.

This phenomenon, along with the lack of counterexamples of fatigue occurring in the opposite direction, supports Marcan priority.

=== Naming of eyewitnesses ===
Where Mark mentions someone by name, someone not well-known originally who could have been left anonymous, Bauckham argues that it is because his audience at the time could refer to them as living eyewitnesses. Several persons are named only in Mark:

- Bartimaeus (Mk 10:46; Mt 20:30; Lk 18:35)
- Alexander and Rufus (Mk 15:21; Mt 27:32; Lk 23:26)
- Salome (Mk 15:40, 16:1; Mt 27:55–56, 28:1; Lk 23:49, 24:10)

The reverse situation of Matthew or Luke naming those unnamed in Mark never occurs. If, as Bauckham reasons, the reason for the omission of these names in Matthew and Luke is that these persons have since died, this phenomenon lends support to Mark being composed earliest.

=== External evidence ===
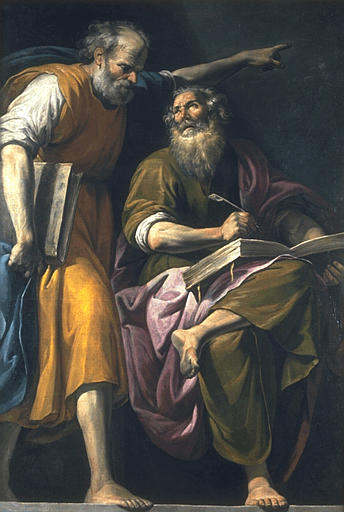
Pasqualotto, St. Mark writes his Gospel at the dictation of St. Peter, 17th century

The early patristic evidence records a few traditions on the origins of the Synoptic Gospels. It never indicates that one gospel used another as a source and shows little concern even for their chronological order; the focus was rather on who composed them and on their apostolic authority. What evidence there is as to the order of composition or publication is seen as virtually unanimous agreement on placing Matthew first.

The earliest relevant source is Papias (c. 105), whose surviving fragments report two notable facts, echoed by most later sources. The evangelist Mark, he says, was Peter's interpreter and compiled his Gospel from the preaching of Peter in Rome, which Peter then sanctioned for use in the churches. Matthew the Apostle, on the other hand, wrote his account himself in the "Hebrew dialect".

This account of the origin of Mark is seen as likely genuine by many scholars, though hardly all. If so, Mark's source is not the other two Synoptics but Peter—unless Peter himself drew from them, as some propose.

The curious statement that Matthew's logia (as Papias calls it) was written in the "Hebrew dialect"—the ordinary way of referring to either the Hebrew or the Aramaic language—has been much discussed. The difficulty is that canonical Matthew is in Greek and does not appear to be a translation, nor is any such original Hebrew version known. Some scholars have argued that Papias simply meant "a Semitic style" in Greek. Other synoptic theorists have speculated on some role of this logia as a source for the canonical Gospels; the hypothesis, for example, that canonical Matthew was a recension of the logia making use also of Mark's Gospel was the original foundation for the two-source theory.

Ephrem the Syrian (c. 350) is more explicit about the Gospels' languages: "Matthew the Hebrew wrote this, and behold it was turned into Greek. [...] Matthew wrote the Gospel in Hebrew, Mark in Latin from Simon in the city of Rome, Luke in Greek," and this is echoed in many later sources such as Gregory of Nazianzus. Mark writing in Latin may have arisen merely by inference, but it is true that canonical Mark exhibits numerous Latinisms, and some have argued that indeed canonical Mark was translated from a Latin original. Most scholars, however, reject this view and consider the Greek original.

Irenaeus (c. 185), who knew the work of Papias, gives the first extant account of the origins of Luke (to which later sources add little) and of all four Gospels together:

So Matthew, among the Hebrews in their own dialect, brought forth a writing of the Gospel, while Peter and Paul in Rome were evangelizing and founding the church. But after their departure Mark, the disciple and interpreter of Peter, himself handed what was preached by Peter down to us in writing. And Luke, the follower of Paul, set forth in a book the Gospel that was preached by him. Then John, the disciple of the Lord and also the one who leaned against his chest, also published the Gospel when residing in Ephesus of Asia.

It is doubtful whether Irenaeus intends a chronological order in this passage; "while" need not be understood temporally, and "after their departure" need not indicate the time of composition, but simply that the apostles' testimony survived in writing even after they themselves were gone. Elsewhere Irenaeus often prefers the order Matthew—Luke—Mark—John when addressing the Gospels together, and this order thereafter recurs commonly in a wide variety of ancient sources. In fact, early Bibles and canons arranged the four Gospels in many different sequences, though most placed Matthew first among the Synoptics.

From Clement (c. 195), who probably also knew the work of Papias, comes a unique and much-discussed statement that the gospels with genealogies (i.e., Matthew and Luke) were "written before" (progegraphthai), in contrast to Mark. Farmer touted this as support for Marcan posteriority, but Carlson argued that the word was better interpreted as "openly published", in contrast to Mark's initially private circulation.

Origen (c. 250), a pupil of Clement who also knew the work of Irenaeus well, enumerates the Gospels as follows: "As learned by tradition… the first written was Matthew… the second, Mark… the third, Luke… after all of them, John." Most readers then and now have seen this as a clear statement of chronology, though some have doubted that was Origen's intent. In any case, this canonical order was increasingly well established by this time, and subsequent sources accepted this temporal sequence.

Augustine (c. 400) recites this traditional chronological order and adds his own influential inferences. Denying that each evangelist wrote in ignorance of his predecessors, he describes Mark as "seemingly an attendant and epitomizer" of Matthew. Later in the same work, Augustine revises his opinion and sees Mark as following not only Matthew but also Luke; Mark "walks with both". This is sometimes seen as the first suggestion that one Gospel used another as a source, but it is not at all clear whether Augustine had literary dependence in mind.

In summary, the external evidence stands against Matthew using Mark, inasmuch as Matthew was written first, and against Mark directly using Matthew, unless perhaps either of these canonical Gospels is a translation into Greek influenced by the other. The patristic consensus, rather, was literary independence. However, the value of this external evidence is uncertain; most synoptic scholars regard it as being of little help and focus almost entirely on the internal evidence instead.
