= Henry Owen =

Welsh theologian and biblical scholar (1716-1795)

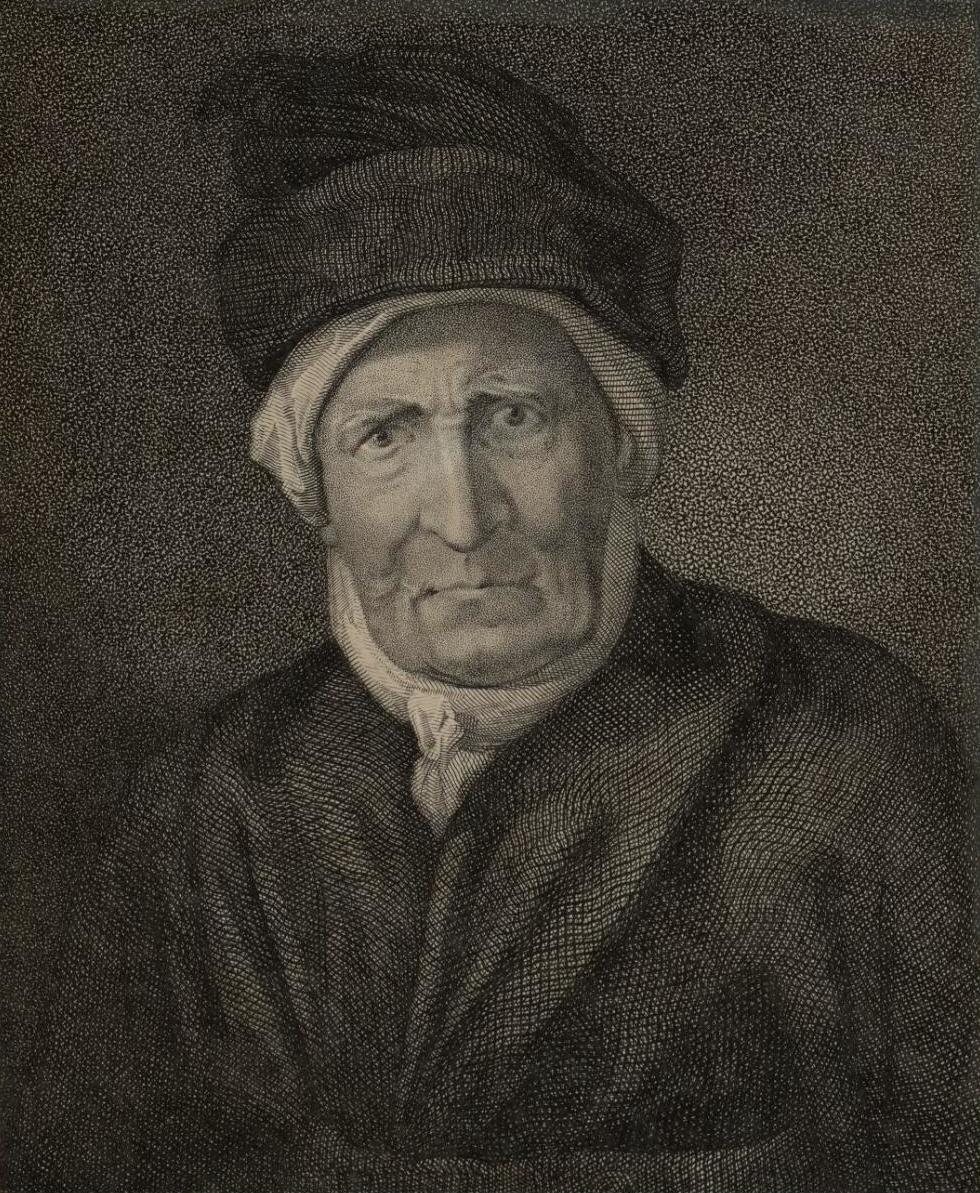
Henry Owen

Henry Owen FRS (1716–1795) was a Welsh theologian and biblical scholar. In biblical scholarship he discussed the date of publication and the form and manner of the composition of the four canonical gospel accounts.

== Life ==
He was the son of William Owen, born at his father's home near Cadair Idris, and educated at Ruthin School. He entered Jesus College, Oxford, in 1736. There took his degrees in arts (B.A. 1739, M.A.1743), while also devoting himself to mathematical studies, before concentrating on medical studies (M.B. 1746, M.D. 1753).

Ordained to the Anglican Church in 1746, Owen practised medicine for three years while a curate in Gloucestershire to Theophilus Leigh, at Broadwell with Adlestrop. Advancement came, through Ralph Thoresby (1698–1763), son of Ralph Thoresby the antiquarian and rector of Stoke Newington, to whom he acted as curate, and Matthew Fetherstonhaugh, who presented him in 1752 to the living of Terling in Essex. He gave up Terling in 1760, when presented to the London parish St Olave Hart Street. From 1775 he also held the living of Edmonton, Middlesex, through Shute Barrington, bishop of Llandaff, whose chaplain he had become.

From 1769 to 1771 Owen was Boyle Lecturer. He died on 14 October 1795 and is buried at All Saints' Church, Edmonton.

== Works ==
Owen's major work was Observations on the Four Gospels, tending chiefly to ascertain the time of their Publication, and to illustrate the form and manner of their Composition (1764). The "Griesbach hypothesis" of Johann Jakob Griesbach, a form of two-gospel hypothesis, has been attributed to Owen.

Among Owen's other publications are:

- Harmonia Trigonometrica, or A short treatise on Trigonometry (1748);
- The Intent and Propriety of the Scripture Miracles considered and explained (1755);
- An Enquiry into the present State of the Septuagint Version of the Old Testament (1769);
- Critica Sacra, or a short Introduction to Hebrew Criticism (1774); he replied, in a Supplement to this work, to comments on the Critic Sacra made by Raphael Baruch or Baruh in Critica Sacra Examined (1775). Baruh was a Sephardic immigrant in Britain from Livorno.
- Collatio codicis Cottoniani Geneseos cum editione Romana a Joanne Ernesto Grabe jam olim facta nunc demum summa cura edita ab Henrico Owen, M.D. (1778);
- A brief Account, historical and critical, of the Septuagint Version of the Old Testament, to which is added a Dissertation on the comparative Excellency of the Hebrew and Samaritan Pentateuch (1787);
- The Modes of Quotation used by the Evangelical Writers, explained and vindicated (1789).

Owen also helped to complete a number of works by William Bowyer, who published works of Owen: the two were on close terms.

== Family ==
In 1760 Owen married Mary Butts, daughter of Robert Butts, bishop of Norwich. They had a son, Henry Butts Owen, who took over from his father as vicar of St Olave Hart Street in 1794, and five daughters.
