= Augustinian hypothesis =

Theory on the origin of the synoptic Gospels

- Augustinian Proposal

Theory Information
- Order: Matt; Mark; Luke
- Additional Sources: Preaching of Peter

Gospels' Sources
- Mark: Matt, preaching of Peter
- Luke: Matt, Mark

Theory History
- Proponents: Augustine of Hippo

The Augustinian hypothesis (sometimes referred to as the Augustinian Proposal) is a solution to the synoptic problem, which concerns the origin of the canonical Gospels in the New Testament. The hypothesis holds that Matthew was written first, by Matthew the Evangelist (see the Gospel According to the Hebrews and the Jewish-Christian Gospels). Mark the Evangelist wrote the Gospel of Mark second and used Matthew and the preaching of Peter as sources. Luke the Evangelist wrote the Gospel of Luke and was aware of the two Gospels that preceded him. Unlike some competing hypotheses, this hypothesis does not rely on, nor does it argue for, the existence of any document that is not explicitly mentioned in historical testimony. Instead, the hypothesis draws primarily upon historical testimony, rather than textual criticism, as the central line of evidence. The foundation of evidence for the hypothesis is the writings of the Church Fathers: historical sources dating back to as early as the first half of the 2nd century, which have been held as authoritative by most Christians for nearly two millennia. Adherents to the Augustinian hypothesis view it as a simple, coherent solution to the synoptic problem.

The Augustinian hypothesis addresses certain fundamental points of contention surrounding the synoptic problem, such as how reliable the early Christian tradition is, which gospel was written first, whether there were other unknown sources behind the gospels, to what extent, if any, the gospels were redacted, and to what extent the gospels were altered between the time they were originally written and the time the first surviving manuscripts appear. These and other matters are raised and alternate resolutions proposed by proponents of competing hypotheses, such as the two-source hypothesis, its related Q hypothesis, the Farrer hypothesis, and others.

The main two areas of contention within the Augustinian community are whether Matthew was originally written in the Aramaic language using Hebrew script (see Aramaic primacy), or if the Greek text is the original, and whether it was Mark or Luke who wrote second. A modified version of the Augustinian hypothesis, known as the Griesbach hypothesis, agrees that Matthew wrote first and that Mark depended on Matthew, and does not dispute that the original text was in Hebrew thereafter translated into Greek, but argues that Mark also depended on Luke and therefore that Luke's gospel precedes Mark's. Because of the similarity on primary points of contention, this hypothesis is also treated as a possible amendment to the Augustinian hypothesis.

== Origin ==
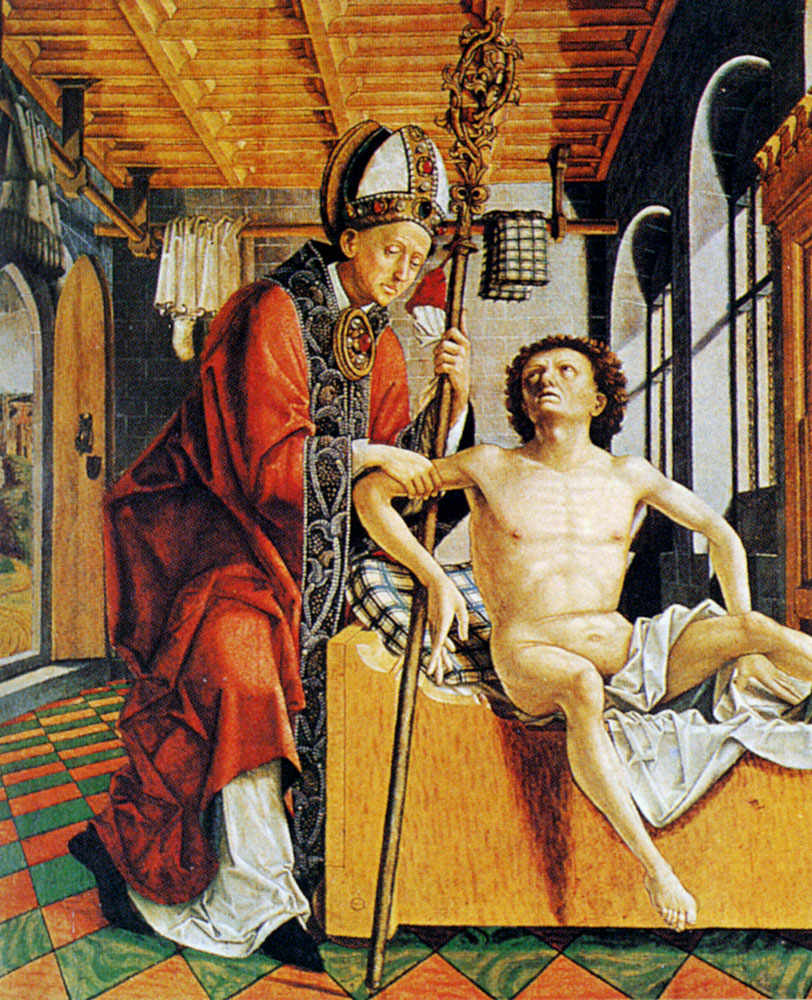
St. Augustine Freeing A Prisoner, by Michael Pacher (1482)

The hypothesis takes its name from Augustine of Hippo, an early 5th-century Christian theologian, Church Father, and bishop from Roman Africa, who wrote: "Now, those four evangelists whose names have gained the most remarkable circulation over the whole world, and whose number has been fixed as four, ...are believed to have written in the order which follows: first Matthew, then Mark, thirdly Luke, lastly John." And: "Of these four, it is true, only Matthew is reckoned to have written in the Hebrew language; the others in Greek. And however they may appear to have kept each of them a certain order of narration proper to himself, this certainly is not to be taken as if each individual writer chose to write in ignorance of what his predecessor had done..."

Mark was famously dubbed by Augustine as pedissequus et breviator Matthaei ("the attendant and abbreviator of Matthew"), in direct contrast to the view most commonly held in academia today, that Mark's gospel was the earliest. Augustine also discussed the commonalities between the Synoptic Gospels, including the identical language found in Matthew, Mark, and Luke. Augustine was not the first to articulate this view, as Irenaeus and Origen, among others, shared this ordering. However, Augustine is the earliest extant author to give a detailed scholarly textual analysis of the three texts' interdependence, and to articulate a theory for the express purpose of explaining this fact.

== Ancient tradition ==
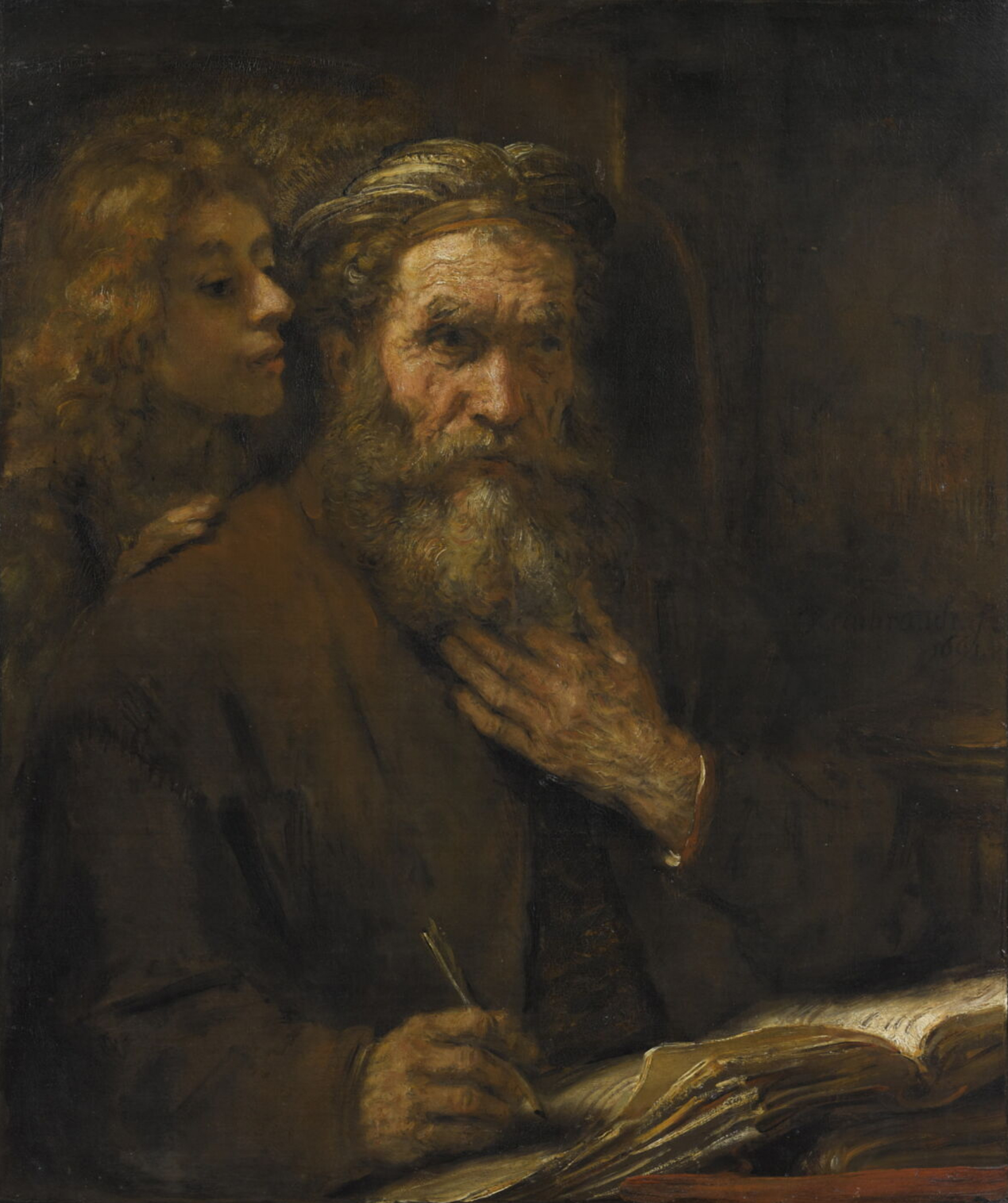
The Evangelist Matthew Inspired by an Angel, by Rembrandt (1661), Louvre, Paris

The Church Fathers who wrote about the order and authorship of the canonical Gospels all supported some basic ideas of the Augustinian hypothesis. The fathers whose writings survive and who wrote about authorship are almost unanimous in agreement that Matthew the apostle was the author, wrote first, and did so for the Hebrews in their language. A number of sources in antiquity asserted that Mark wrote his Gospel after Matthew based on the preaching of Peter. Various elements of this tradition are found in the writings of Irenaeus, Origen, Eusebius, and others.

The text of the Gospel itself circulated with a title "According to Matthew", a tradition indisputably acknowledged before the close of the 2nd century. In addition, the title "According to Matthew" is found in the earliest manuscripts. A number of scholars have argued that the title must be dated no later than 125. Many contemporary scholars, however, believe it was originally anonymous.

The earliest surviving references to the gospel tradition are quoted by Eusebius (lived c. 263–339 CE), and different but related traditions appear in the works of Papias (wrote during the first half of 2nd century CE) and the works of Clement. A third ancient source, Irenaeus, also provides further information about the traditions, especially that of Papias, and possibly adds a third related tradition to the sources. These related traditions generally agree on the primary points of contention within the Augustinian hypothesis, though not without discrepancies. Rather than seen as a refutation to the hypothesis, instead these discrepancies are often cited in defense of the hypothesis because they counter the argument that the entire tradition is merely a repetition of Papias's original assertion (therefore, if he were wrong, the great many historical sources supporting the theory would be inconsequential). Instead, slight disagreement is actually in favor of multiple, near identical traditions.

=== Papias ===
According to Irenaeus, Papias was "a hearer of John and a companion of Polycarp, a man of primitive times", who wrote a volume in "five books." The benefit of historical immediacy, as argued by D. H. Fischer is one of the key determinants of historicity, and the church father Papias is a very early source in regard to testimony that the Matthew wrote his gospel first. Papias wrote that: "Matthew compiled the sayings in the Hebrew language, and everyone translated them as well he could." (The 'Hebrew language' referred to by Papias has often been interpreted as Aramaic.)

It has been argued, because Papias does not cite an authority for his assertions concerning Matthew but does concerning Mark, that Matthew was already fully accepted at the time of his writings.

=== Clement ===
Eusebius also recorded an important tradition from Clement of Alexandria (died c. 213):

In the same volumes Clement has found room for a tradition of the primitive authorities of the Church regarding the order of the gospels. It is this. He used to say that the earliest gospels were those containing the genealogies [Matthew, Luke], while Mark's originated as follows: When, at Rome, Peter had openly preached the word and by the Spirit had proclaimed the gospel, the large audience urged Mark, who had followed him for a long time and remembered what had been said, to write it all down. This he did, making his gospel available to all who wanted it. When Peter heard about this, he made no objection and gave no special encouragement. Last of all, aware that the physical facts had been recorded in the gospels, encouraged by his pupils and irresistibly moved by the Spirit, John wrote a spiritual gospel.

This source claims multiple authorities of antiquity, not merely Papias; this is taken as evidence against the view that the testimony of the Fathers is based solely upon the witness of Papias. Furthermore the tradition of Clement concurs with the significant point of contention: Matthean priority. However, Clement conflicts with the Augustinian hypothesis concerning the order of Mark and Luke. The Griesbach hypothesis attempts to resolve the difficulty concerning this secondary point of contention by stating Luke wrote before Mark.

=== Irenaeus ===
Irenaeus, who was familiar with the work of Papias and who knew Polycarp and possibly even the apostle John, wrote: "Now Matthew published also a book of the Gospel among the Hebrews in their own dialect, while Peter and Paul were preaching the gospel in Rome and founding the Church."

He is quoted by Eusebius (Note: Irenaeus's Against Heresies is available not only as portions quoted by Eusebius, but also in complete Latin copies, although not in the original.) as saying:

2. Matthew published his Gospel among the Hebrews in their own language, while Peter and Paul were preaching and founding the church in Rome.

3. After their departure Mark, the disciple and interpreter of Peter, also transmitted to us in writing those things which Peter had preached; and Luke, the attendant of Paul, recorded in a book the Gospel which Paul had declared.

4. Afterwards John, the disciple of the Lord, who also reclined on his bosom, published his Gospel, while staying at Ephesus in Asia.

Irenaeus gives here another tradition in accord with Papias, though containing more information. This has been taken as evidence of a third, yet harmonious tradition. However, Irenaeus places the composition of Mark after Peter's death, while Clement (and others, such as Origen and Eusebius) claimed Peter was alive and approved the work. Nonetheless, his chronology of the composition of the books does accord with the Augustinian hypothesis (which does not directly address whether Peter was alive at the time of the composition of Mark).

An original Aramaic version of Matthew does not exist in the sense that no copy survives in the original language today. Many proponents of the Augustinian hypothesis hold that the current Greek Matthew is a complete translation of the original Aramaic Matthew. This theory has strong support in a number of Church Fathers. Papias, Irenaeus, Origen, Eusebius, Epiphanius and Jerome all agree that the original Matthew was written in Hebrew. Jerome even claimed to have seen the original Aramaic Matthew in the library of Pamphilus the Martyr. Eusebius wrote in c. 325 that Pantaerus found a copy of the Gospel of Matthew written in Hebrew in India, and that it had been left there by Bartholomew. In c. 376, Epiphanius wrote there was "no doubt" that a sect in Palestine still used the original Hebrew text "just as it was originally written." And, of course, Augustine also repeated this tradition. To these authors should be added Pantaenus, Athanasius, John Chrysostom, Cyril of Jerusalem, Gregory of Nazianzus, and others in agreement. However, most modern scholars believe Matthew was originally composed in Greek (see Aramaic New Testament hypotheses and Hebrew Gospel hypothesis).

== Augustinian revival ==
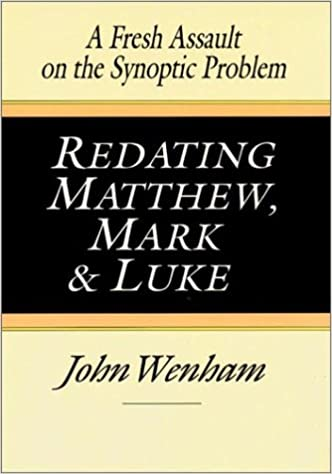
Book cover of John Wenham's Redating Matthew, Mark and Luke

The Augustinian position, and the similar Griesbach hypothesis, has drawn recent interest, especially from Christopher Butler, John Wenham, William R. Farmer, and other Christian scholars as an alternative solution to the synoptic problem, and has been employed as a scholarly refutation of Marcan priority, the Q hypothesis, and the two-source hypothesis.

Butler argued that accepting the priority of Matthew rendered it possible to dispense with the hypothetical Q document altogether, a position he supported by arguments concerning the inadmissibility of appealing to Q as a sound explanation of the cases where Matthew appears to be more original than Mark.

Likewise it has been pointed out that differences between the synoptic Gospels are as easily explained by differing purposes of the authors than by forced redactions or omissions due to ignorance. Furthermore, against certain arguments that the “primitiveness” of the ideas within the Gospels is the determining factor in their literary interdependence, it is observed that defining "primitiveness" carries obvious difficulties.

Farmer argued that a modification of the Augustinian hypothesis, the so-called two-gospel hypothesis, ordering Matthew-Luke-Mark, eliminated all reasons for the existence of Q, a position whose credibility was conceded by W.C. Allen and others. Bernard Orchard also developed the two-gospel hypothesis and suggested a plausible historic scenario that merged its ideas with the historic evidence that underlines the Augustinian hypothesis.

=== Modern position in detail ===
Recently, modern scholars accepting some form of the Augustinian hypothesis have attempted to develop a detailed argument explaining the theoretical origin of the synoptic Gospels. There was a perceived need for this in response to recent competing theories, expressed by Bernard Orchard: “the two-document hypothesis and the priority of Mark are still only hypotheses, not infallible dogmas, and they have stood secure for so long chiefly because no one has been able to offer any satisfactory alternative." Central to this process is the assumption that the gospel's development should be understood as a reaction to various developing needs of the early church.

John Wenham argued that, in the early Jerusalem Church, there would have been an early need for the production of a written record to augment the "atmosphere of spontaneity" within which the apostles, disciples, and eyewitnesses would have given instruction. The reasons for this, he asserted, were: the need for instruction when no qualified teacher was available, the need for consistency and accuracy in what was taught as it spread throughout the first scattered Christian communities, and for the purpose of evangelization. Wenham also argued that Matthew was a natural choice since, as a tax collector, he would have had the requisite literacy, as well as his first hand memories, and perhaps even notes. Others have observed that persecutions in Palestine, threatening dispersion of the Christians, would have been a motivating factor for a text of the life of Jesus.

The majority Hebrew makeup of the primitive Church has been seen as support of Aramaic primacy. Besides the traditional material (see above), other support for an Aramaic Matthew advanced in recent years includes the theory that the Medieval Hebrew gospel of Matthew in Even Bohan could be a corrupted version of the original.

Bernard Orchard identified the above period as a "first phase" of the development of the Gospels, distinguished from the subsequent phase by the events of the year 42:

A savage persecution of the Church, begun by Herod Agrippa I in AD 42, was the signal for the dispersion of the apostles now possessing in the Gospel of Matthew the necessary tool to support and confirm their preaching, while at the same time preserving their theological unity. The first phase was completed, and the second phase of the Church's expansion was about to begin with the mission of Paul.

Central to Orchard's characterization of this new second phase is the distinction between a primarily Hebrew orientation and a primarily Greek orientation, focusing not only on the Jewish converts to Christianity, but to the Gentile converts as well. This, he argues, resulted in three key events: the translation of the original Matthew into Greek, the production of the Gospel of Mark within the context of Peter's preaching to Greek-speaking converts in Rome, and Luke's authorship of his Gospel under the instruction of Paul. Cited in support of this are the comments of Clement, Irenaeus, and others who state that the Gospel of Mark was written by Mark, a follower of the apostle Peter, based on his speeches. Orchard countered the claim that the Gospel of Mark must have been written first, since it contains less information than Matthew and Luke, by positing that Peter elected not to speak on certain subjects, such as the birth and resurrection narratives, since he had not been a direct witness of those events.

The notion that Peter employed Matthew in his preaching was supported by B.C. Butler, but not by John Wenham, who instead explained the similar structure by arguing simply that Mark used both his recollection of his instruction from the Gospel of Matthew and his memory of the preaching of Peter to pen his own synthesis.

The association of the Gospel of Luke with Paul the Apostle, which is witnessed by tradition, has led some to argue that Luke was with Paul during his imprisonment in Rome, or to at least place the date of composition prior to 70 and the fall of Jerusalem. The author of Luke also wrote in his prologue that he employed various sources in composing his work. Wenham argued that an excess of such material, along with the constraints of scroll length, was one cause of his noticeable omission of material found in Matthew and Mark.

An unusual modern scholar who supported the notion that the synoptic Gospels were of an early date, specifically before 70, was John Robinson. Though generally considered a liberal theologian, his views in respect to the development of the Gospels were consistent with the Augustinian hypothesis. He wrote in his work Redating the New Testament that past scholarship was based on a "tyranny of unexamined assumptions" and an "almost wilful blindness," concluding that the New Testament was written before 64, and that there is no compelling evidence and little evidence of any kind that anything in the New Testament reflects knowledge of the Temple's destruction. Furthermore, in relation to the four gospels, according to Norman Geisler:

"Robinson places Matthew at 40 to after 60, Mark at about 45 to 60, Luke at before 57 to after 60, and John at from 40 to after 65."

== See also ==
- Early Christian writings
- Farrer hypothesis
- Four-document hypothesis
- Gospel harmony
- Griesbach hypothesis
- Hebrew Gospel hypothesis
- Two-source hypothesis
