= John Evangelist Walsh =

American author (1927–2015)

- Born: John Evangelist Walsh; December 27, 1927; Manhattan, New York City
- Died: March 19, 2015 (age 87); Monroe, Wisconsin
- Education: Iona College (dropped out)
- Occupations: Author, biographer, editor, historian, journalist
- Spouse: Dorothy Schubis (1956–2015)
- Children: John Walsh, Timothy Walsh, Ann Walsh, Matthew Walsh
- Relatives: Thomas Walsh, Ann Walsh née Cunney (parents)
- Writing career
- Language: English
- Years active: 1948–2015
- Period: 1963–2012
- Genres: History, literary biography
- Notable works: Unraveling Piltdown, The Bones of Saint Peter: The First Full Account of the Discovery of the Apostle's Tomb, Midnight Dreary: The Mysterious Death of Edgar Allan Poe, Reader's Digest Bible, Moonlight: Abraham Lincoln and the Almanac Trial
- Notable awards: Best Fact Crime Edgar Award

John Evangelist Walsh (1927–2015) was an American author, biographer, editor, historian and journalist. He was best known for leading a team of seven editors tasked with creating a condensed version of the Revised Standard Version of the Bible. Born in 1927, he first began working in journalism while serving in the US Army from 1946 to 1948, after which he worked for a variety of publishing companies, mainly condensing literature. He retired in his early 70s, while still regularly writing and publishing novels. He died on March 19, 2015, in Monroe, Wisconsin, at age 87.

== Life and career ==
John Evangelist Walsh was born in Manhattan, New York City on December 27, 1927, to Thomas and Ann (née Cunney) Walsh. He was of Irish descent. Walsh attended high school at the now-closed Power Memorial Academy in Manhattan, and after his senior year, enlisted in the US Army, serving in the infantry in Trieste, Italy, from 1946 to 1948. It was during that time when Walsh first became involved in journalism, reporting and taking photographs for The Spearhead and The Blue Devil, two military newspapers.

Following his two years of service, he enrolled at Iona College in New Rochelle, New York, but dropped out to take a job as a reporter The Oneonta Daily Star. He later worked as an editor at Prentice Hall, Simon & Schuster, and Reader's Digest, where he worked mainly on condensed-literature projects. He married his wife, Dorothy Schubis, on November 17, 1956, in Flushing, Queens, New York.

Walsh's time at Reader's Digest marked an ambitious and unprecedented project: the condensation of the Bible, an enterprise that would make him and his colleagues well known on a national scale. According to John T. Beaudouin, the Reader's Digest Condensed Books editor during those years, the magazine had been eager to condense the Bible for a long time, but was not sure if it was feasible. He told The New York Times in 1982:

''We condensed a 14-volume set of 56 classics for young readers in the late 1960s, but the Bible had always been considered the ultimate challenge. We weren't sure we could do it, but after we studied the text and found it repetitive we thought we could.''

The first phases of planning began in 1975, and by 1979, a team of seven editors was assembled, with John Walsh as the director. The whole project, however, was placed under the supervision of the Rev. Bruce M. Metzger, a Presbyterian minister and esteemed biblical scholar and author. He served as the final say in what verses and chapters were necessary for inclusion. The team decided to condense the Revised Standard Version (RSV) rather than the King James Version (KJV) because the RSV language was simpler to begin with, in contrast to the older vocabulary and abstruse language found in the KJV. The RSV is 850,000 words long, and the team set out to remove repetition and unnecessary inclusions. Walsh installed a strict system for condensation: first, editors must consult three unique scholarly analyses of any given passage before editing it. After changes were made, it would be reviewed by a second editor, and then sent to Walsh for inspection. If the condensation was deemed adequate, it would be given to the Rev. Metzger for a final appraisal. In the end, around 55% of the Old Testament and 25% of the New Testament was expunged, a total of 40% of the Bible overall. Walsh commented to the New York Times on the difficulty of project in 1982 on the date of the Bible's release:

''It was the hardest job I've ever done in my life. We were dealing with a library of ancient literature with so many different literary forms to which the condensation had to be adjusted and adapted.''

He then acknowledged he originally had qualms about the project, citing the Book of Revelation, which forbids changing "the words of the book of this prophecy." However, his early doubts were replaced by satisfaction in the end, telling the New York Times 'Our Bible is still the word of God, but it's easier to get into and stay with and appreciate.'' The project in its entirety took three years, and the Reader's Digest Bible was released on September 22, 1982.

While the Reader's Digest Bible was perhaps his most famous accomplishment, Walsh was a lifelong writer. He was moderately well known in the historical nonfiction and literary biographical genres, some of his better known books being The Bones of Saint Peter: The First Full Account of the Discovery of the Apostle's Tomb, Midnight Dreary: The Mysterious Death of Edgar Allan Poe, Poe the Detective: The Curious Circumstances Behind "The Mystery of Marie Roget", and Unraveling Piltdown: The Science Fraud of the Century and Its Solution. His books Midnight Dreary and Moonlight: Abraham Lincoln and the Almanac Trial were nominated for Edgar Awards, and Midnight Dreary and The Shadows Rise: Abraham Lincoln and the Ann Rutledge Legend were both finalists for the Lincoln Prize. His only award-winning publication was Poe the Detective: The Curious Circumstances Behind "The Mystery of Marie Roget", which won an Edgar Award for Best Fact Crime in 1969.

After over 60 years in New York City, Walsh retired with his wife, Dorothy, to Monroe, Wisconsin, where he continued to publish books and write articles, mostly about Monroe and Green County history. He died on March 19, 2015, in a Monroe hospital, leaving behind nine unpublished texts, on such wide-ranging topics as Ralph Waldo Emerson, Edgar Allan Poe, Robert Frost, the Shroud of Turin, Pearl Harbor, and two mystery novels. His obituary reported that he was writing just one day prior to his death.

== Bibliography ==
- The Bones of Saint Peter: The First Full Account of the Discovery of the Apostle's Tomb
- This Brief Tragedy: Unravelling the Todd-Dickinson Affair
- Dagger of the Mind: Solving the Mystery of Shakespeare's Death
- Darkling I Listen: The Last Days and Death of John Keats
- Emily Dickinson in Love: The Case for Otis Lord
- The Execution of Major Andre
- The First Book of Physical Fitness
- First Flight: The Untold Story of the Wright Brothers
- The Hidden Life of Emily Dickinson: A Biography
- Into My Own: The English Years of Robert Frost, 1912–1915
- The Letters of Francis Thompson
- The Man Who Buried Jesus: A Novel
- Memoirs of a Middle Aged Chancer
- Midnight Dreary: The Mysterious Death of Edgar Allan Poe (Edgar Award nominee in the Best Critical/Biographical Work category; Lincoln Prize finalist)
- Moonlight: Abraham Lincoln and the Almanac Trial (Edgar Award nominee in the Best Fact Crime category)
- The Night Casey Was Born: The True Story Behind the Great American Ballad "Casey at the Bat"
- Night on Fire: The First Complete Account of John Paul Jones's Greatest Battle
- Olympic Games (First Book)
- One Day at Kitty Hawk: The Untold Story of the Wright Brothers and the Airplane
- Plumes in the Dust: The Love Affair of Edgar Allan Poe and Fanny Osgood
- Poe the Detective: The Curious Circumstances Behind "The Mystery of Marie Roget" (Edgar Award winner in the Best Fact Crime category)
- The Reader's Digest Bible (leader of team of 7 editors)
- The Shadows Rise: Abraham Lincoln and the Ann Rutledge Legend (Lincoln Prize finalist)
- The Shroud: The Authoritative, Comprehensive and Concise Report on the Single Most Fascinating Artifact in the Christian World
- The Sinking of the USS Maine, February 15, 1898: The Incident That Triggered the Spanish–American War.
- Strange Harp, Strange Symphony: The Life of Francis Thompson
- The Summer Olympics (A First Book)
- Unraveling Piltdown: The Science Fraud of the Century and Its Solution
- Walking Shadows: Orson Welles, William Randolph Hearst, and Citizen Kane
- When the Laughing Stopped: The Strange, Sad Death of Will Rogers
