= Harry Orlinsky =

- Born: Harry Meyer Orlinsky; March 14, 1908; Owen Sound, Ontario, Canada
- Died: March 21, 1992 (aged 84); Owings Mills, Maryland, U.S.
- Resting place: Mount Lebanon Cemetery; Collingdale, Pennsylvania, U.S.
- Education: Dropsie College, Ph.D., 1935
- Occupation: Bible scholar
- Known for: Chief editor of NJPS Torah
- Spouse: Donya Fein (m. 1934)
- Children: 2

Harry M. Orlinsky (14 March 1908 – 21 March 1992) was an American scholar, who was the editor-in-chief of the Jewish Publication Society (NJPS) translation of the Torah (1962).

== Early life and education ==
Harry Orlinsky was born in 1908 to Yiddish-speaking parents in Owen Sound, Ontario on March 17. Growing up, pool was one of his favorite pastimes. He attended the University of Toronto and began his religious studies with a Bible class taught by Theophile Meek. Under Meek’s mentorship, Orlinsky went on to earn his PhD at Philadelphia’s Dropsie College for his work on the translation of the Septuagint, the Jewish Greek translation of the Bible. While there, he met his future wife Donya Fein. Orlinsky then completed a year of post-doctoral work at the Hebrew University in Jerusalem. Upon his return to the United States, he started working at the Baltimore Hebrew Teachers College (1936-1944). During this time he also studied at Johns Hopkins University with William F. Albright. Because of World War II, Albright was unable to secure the necessary funds for Orlinsky to become a permanent member of the faculty at Hopkins. Instead, Orlinsky, with the help of Albright, was able to secure a post with the Jewish Institute of Religion in 1943 (now merged with the Hebrew Union College) and it is here that Orlinsky spent the rest of his career.

Orlinsky married Donya Fein in 1934 and they had two sons, Walter (Velvel) and Seymour (Zeke). Orlinsky died on Saturday 21 March 1992 at North Oaks Retirement Community in Owings Mills, Maryland. He was 84 years old. He was buried at Mount Lebanon Cemetery in Collingdale, Pennsylvania.

== Work as a translator ==
Perhaps the greatest result of Orlinsky’s work on Torah translation was the creation of a gender-free translation of the Bible. Since the translator must interpret and explain the text, it behooves him (or her) to understand why certain words were used. If a language has a preference for masculine pronouns, is that because the reference is really to males, or does it have to do with the way a language functions? A similar example from modern times is the use of "guys" to refer to a group of people in general, regardless of gender. If the rest of the text did not use a masculine pronoun but rather used a more gender-neutral term such as "one," then Orlinsky felt it was safe to say that the translator can use that term as well for the masculine pronouns within a given text.

Orlinsky's work earned him the position as a key translator on not one but two new Bible translations. Starting 1952, he helped the Protestant National Council with their Revised Standard Version (RSV) of the Bible and then again with the New Revised Standard Version (1989). Walter Harrelson, the vice-chairman of the 1989 translation committee, said that Orlinsky was instrumental in the translation. He helped to keep the committee on track in using the older Massoretic text rather than the easier-to-translate Septuagint, which is a Greek translation. Harrelson recalls Orlinsky's constant reminder, "We’re translating Hebrew Scriptures. We're not translating from the Greek Hebrew Scriptures."

Following the success of the RSV in 1952, Orlinsky turned his attention to a new translation of the Bible for Jews. He urged the Jewish Publication Society of America (JPS) to take up the task, since it was they who were responsible for the 1917 version still in use at the time. Orlinsky became the editor-in-chief for the Torah, which was published in 1962. He was also instrumental in helping to get The Prophets (1978) and The Writings (1982) published as well. Orlinsky helped move the translation of the Bible away from the literalism of the King James Version to the exegesis that was the hallmark of JPS’s 1917 translation and Orlinsky’s translation work.

== Mr. Green Affair ==
In 1954, the Israeli government sought to authenticate four Dead Sea Scrolls being sold in New York City. The Metropolitan of the Syrian Monastery of St. Mark in Jerusalem ran a small ad in The Wall Street Journal, which was then brought to the attention of the Israeli Consulate in New York. The scrolls themselves had been at the center of a negotiation between the Metropolitan and Professor Eleazar Lippe Sukenik, the founder of the Hebrew University Department of Archaeology, which had been founded following the 1948 Arab-Israeli War. Unfortunately, since the newly founded State of Israel was unable to fund the purchase of the scrolls in 1948, the Metropolitan then moved the scrolls to the United States and deposited them in the Trust Company of New Jersey in Jersey City. It was at this point that the existence of the scrolls came to the attention of Yigael Yadin, from the office of the Consul-General of Israel in New York. Yadin felt that these scrolls belonged to Israel and should be housed there. He was positive, though, that the Metropolitan would not willingly sell the scrolls to Israel. This meant that he had to find someone who was knowledgeable about the scrolls but was not directly connected to Israel.

On July 1, 1954 at noon, Orlinsky received a phone call from Yadin and was summoned Israeli Consulate. Once there, Orlinsky was ushered into the presence of Mr. Harman, the Israeli Consul-General, and Mr. Yadin. They then revealed that the reason for the strange summons was that the Dead Sea Scrolls were currently sitting in the vaults of the Trust Company of New Jersey. Orlinsky was told to assume the name of Mr. Green and examine the scrolls for the Israeli Government.

Orlinsky was instructed to take a taxi to the Lexington Avenue entrance of the Waldorf-Astoria hotel and make sure that he was not being followed. Once there, he would meet with Sydney M. Estridge. Each man had been given a code to identify the other. Once this had been accomplished, they would proceed together to a vault located in the basement and meet with a representative of the Metropolitan. Finally, he was to examine the scrolls, keep his speech to an absolute minimum, and respond to no other identification than Green.

Following the authentication process, Orlinsky called an unlisted number and spoke the code "lechayim," confirming the scrolls' authenticity. Later, at the Consulate, Orlinsky signed a statement confirming the same, and after he and his wife were sworn to secrecy.

== Written works ==
- Ancient Israel. 1954. Cornell University.
- Studies on the Second Part of the book of Isaiah: The So-Called "Servant of the Lord" and "Suffering Servant" in Second Isaiah. 1967, (enlarged edition 1977). Leiden: Brill.
- Understanding the Bible Through History and Archaeology. 1969. Ktav Publishing House.
- Essays in Biblical and Jewish Culture and Bible Translation. 1973. Ktav.
