= Independence hypothesis =

Proposed solution to the synoptic problem

Independence Hypothesis
- The independence theory posits that each evangelist has independently drawn from eyewitness accounts and perhaps oral tradition.

Theory Information
- Order: No relationship
- Additional Sources: No additional sources

Theory History
- Proponents: Eta Linnemann

The Independence hypothesis is a proposed solution to the synoptic problem. It holds that Matthew, Mark, and Luke are each original compositions formed independently of each other, with no documentary relationship.

Scholars have long noted that the three synoptic gospels have a great deal in common, not just in content but also in order and precise Greek wording. Most scholars have asserted that this must be due to some sort of literary interrelationship among the gospels, with fragments of text copied from one source to another, but have struggled to find a satisfactory theory of who copied from whom. The independence theory rejects this consensus of documentary dependence; rather, each evangelist has independently drawn from eyewitness accounts and perhaps liturgy and other oral tradition.

The similarities among the synoptic gospels, the whole basis for the synoptic problem, are held to be, first of all, vastly overstated, and secondly, explainable as artifacts of relying on the same witnesses or of different witnesses to the same events.

The witnesses to the gospel content, especially apostles such as Peter, would have preached their testimony countless times before contributing to the gospels, and such numerous rehearsals tend to make a story settle into a relatively consistent wording. Any of this material that entered public liturgy (e.g., the Lord's Prayer) would become even more stabilized. On the other hand, different witnesses nearly always preserve different details and present numerous minor inconsistencies. So, too, does a single witness consulted on different occasions. Moreover, sayings and anonymous healings may have recurred many times in a similar fashion, so that seemingly similar accounts actually preserve distinct events. What we would expect to see in the gospels according to this method of composition, goes the theory, is what we find: many similar accounts, often with virtually identical wording, but many additions and omissions, a somewhat different selection of content in each, as well as inconsistencies of order and details.

Protestant theologian Eta Linnemann argues that the reason for four independent Gospels stems from the legal principle of Deuteronomy 19:15: "On the evidence of two or three witnesses a matter shall be confirmed."

== See also ==
- Oral gospel tradition
- Hebrew gospel hypothesis
- Criterion of multiple attestation

== Sources ==
- Richard Bauckham, Jesus and the Eyewitnesses: The Gospels as Eyewitness Testimony (2006).
- Werner Kelber, The Oral-Scribal-Memorial Arts of Communication in Early Christianity (2008).
- Eta Linnemann, Is There a Synoptic Problem?: Rethinking the Literary Dependence of the First Three Gospels (1992).
- Bo Reicke, The Roots of the Synoptic Gospels (1986).
- John M. Rist, On the Independence of Matthew and Mark (1978).
- Robert L. Thomas (ed.), Three Views on the Origins of the Synoptic Gospels (2002).
- John W. Wenham, Redating Matthew, Mark, and Luke: A Fresh Assault on the Synoptic Problem (1991).
