= William R. Farmer =

American theologian (1921–2000)

William Reuben Farmer (1921 – December 31, 2000) was an American New Testament scholar, professor of theology at Southern Methodist University, and advocate of ecumenism.

== Biography ==
Farmer studied at Cambridge University in England and Union Theological Seminary in New York. He graduated from seminary in 1952 and was ordained as a minister of the United Methodist Church. He became a professor at the Perkins School of Theology at Southern Methodist University in Dallas, Texas in 1959 or 1960. There, he was known as an associate and ally to Albert Outler, a Protestant church historian who closely observed and studied the Catholic Church and supported both the paleo-orthodox and the ecumenical movement.

Farmer supported the Southern Christian Leadership Conference (SCLC) and served on its board of directors in supporting civil rights for African-Americans in Dallas. In 1990, at the age of 67, he joined the Roman Catholic Church. After his retirement, he did occasional projects with the University of Dallas, such as editing a volume of Bible commentaries from a Catholic and ecumenical perspective. Farmer died in 2000 in Dallas of prostate cancer.

== Works ==
Farmer's most notable area of research was the synoptic problem, or the question of the nature of the connection between the gospels of Matthew, Mark, and Luke. In his 1964 book The Synoptic Problem: A Critical Analysis, he disputes the two-source hypothesis that had generally become accepted in the 20th century, which suggests that Mark and an unknown tradition called "Q" were used to write Matthew and Luke. Farmer supported a variant of the older Matthean priority, the view of many early Church fathers such as Augustine. Farmer called his preferred version the two-gospel hypothesis, and suggests instead that Mark was the latest gospel that drew from both Matthew and Luke.

In a 1992 paper, Farmer suggested the movement for Marcan priority originated as an effect of the German Kulturkampf in the 1870s, a political and cultural struggle between the largely Lutheran government of the German Empire and the German Catholic Church. In this view, playing down the importance of Matthew would show that the Catholic Church was "wrong" and weaken their claims of canonical authority, opening the way for the Protestant-led government to seize authority and power. Farmer found few supporters for this view.

== Books (selection) ==
- Maccabees, Zealots, and Josephus: An Inquiry into Jewish Nationalism in the Greco-Roman period. New York: Columbia University Press. 1956. LCCN 56-7364.
- The Synoptic Problem: A Critical Analysis. New York: Western North Carolina Press. 1964. (Reprinted in 1976)
- The Last Twelve Verses of Mark. New York: Cambridge University Press. 1974.
- The Gospel of Jesus: The Pastoral Relevance of the Synoptic Problem. Louisville: Westminster John Knox Press. 1994.

== Edited books (selection) ==
- New Synoptic Studies: The Cambridge Gospel Conference and Beyond. Macon, Georgia: Mercer University Press. 1983.
- Biblical Studies and the Shifting of Paradigms, 1850-1914. Macon, Georgia: Mercer University Press. 1995. (with Henning Graf Reventlow)
- The International Catholic Bible Commentary: a Catholic and Ecumenical Commentary for the Twenty-first Century. Collegeville, Minnesota: Liturgical Press. 1998.
- Anti-Judaism and the Gospels. Harrisburg, Pennsylvania: Trinity Press International. 1999.
