= Johann Jakob Griesbach =

German biblical textual critic (1745–1812)

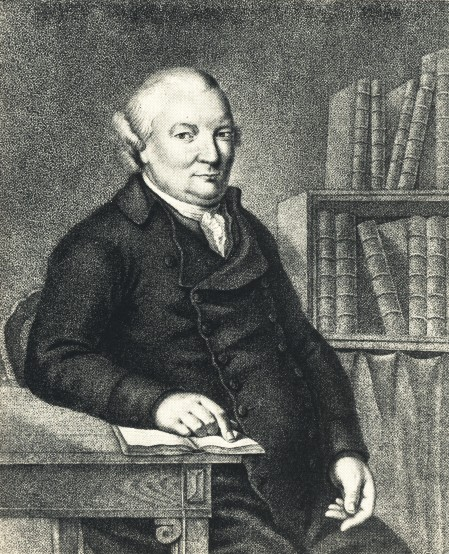
- Johann Jakob Griesbach
- Born: 4 January 1745; Butzbach, Germany
- Died: 24 March 1812 (aged 67); Jena, Germany
- Occupation: Textual critic
- Known for: Griesbach hypothesis

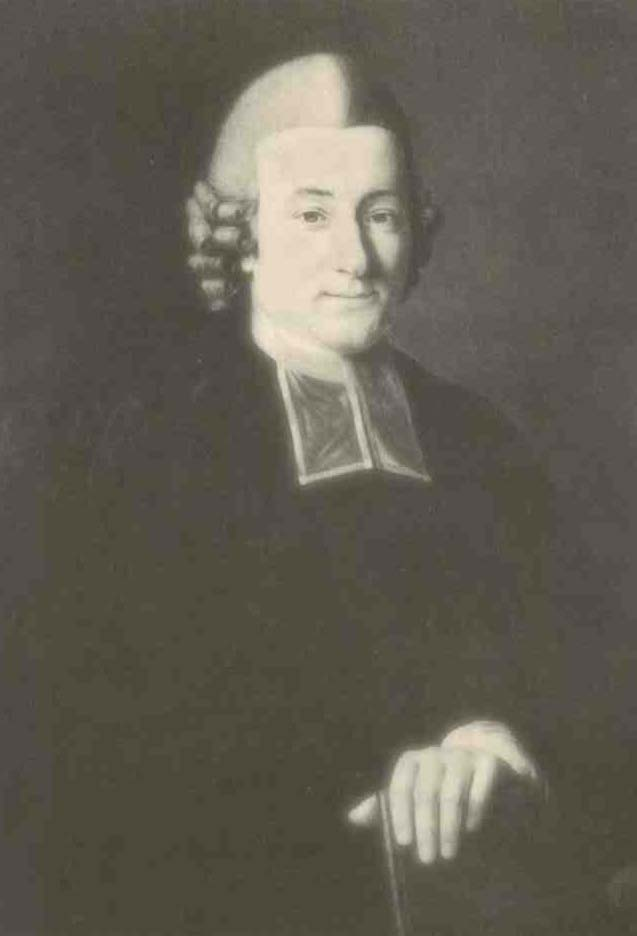
Johann Jakob Griesbach

Johann Jakob Griesbach (4 January 1745 – 24 March 1812) was a German biblical textual critic. Griesbach's fame rests upon his work in New Testament criticism, in which he inaugurated a new epoch. His solution to the synoptic problem bears his name, but the Griesbach hypothesis has become, in modern times, known as the "two-gospel hypothesis."

== Biography ==
He was born in Butzbach, a small town in the state of Hesse-Darmstadt, where his father, Konrad Kaspar (1705–1777), was pastor. Griesbach was educated at Frankfurt, and at the universities of Tübingen, Leipzig and Halle, where he became one of J. S. Semler's most ardent disciples. It was Semler who induced him to turn his attention to the textual criticism of the New Testament. At the close of his undergraduate career he undertook a literary tour through Germany, the Netherlands, France and England. In England he may have met Henry Owen whose seminal work Observations on the Four Gospels (1764) is listed among the books of Griesbach's estate, although he does not seem to have acknowledged any indebtedness to Owen.

On his return to Halle, Griesbach acted for some time as Privatdozent, but in 1773 was appointed to a professorial chair; in 1775 he went to the University of Jena, where he spent the rest of his life (though he received calls to other universities).

He died in Jena.

== New Testament text critic ==
Griesbach's critical edition of the New Testament first appeared at Halle, in three volumes, in 1774–1775. The first volume contained the first three Gospels, synoptically arranged; the second, the Epistles and the book of Revelation. All the historical books were reprinted in one volume in 1777, the synoptical arrangement of the Gospels having been abandoned as inconvenient. Of the second edition, considerably enlarged and improved, the first volume appeared in 1796 and the second in 1806 (Halle and London). Of a third edition, edited by David Schulz, only the first volume, containing the four Gospels, appeared (1827).

For the construction of his critical text Griesbach took as his basis the Elzevir edition. Where he differed from it he placed the Elzevir reading on the inner margin along with other readings he thought worthy of special consideration (these last, however, being printed in smaller type). To all the readings on this margin he attached special marks indicating the precise degree of probability in his opinion attaching to each. In weighing these probabilities he proceeded upon a particular theory which in its leading features he had derived from J. A. Bengel and J. S. Semler, dividing all the manuscripts into three main groups – the Alexandrian, the Western and the Byzantine.

A reading supported by only one recension he considered as having only one witness in its favour; those readings which were supported by all the three recensions, or even by two of them, especially if these two were the Alexandrian and the Western, he unhesitatingly accepted as genuine. Only when each of the three recensions gives a different reading does he proceed to discuss the question on other grounds.

See his Symbolae criticae ad supplendas et corrigendas variarum N. T. lectionum collectiones (Halle, 1785, 1793), and his Commentarius criticus in textum Graecum N. T., which extends to the end of Mark and discusses the more important various readings with great care and thoroughness (Jena, 1794 if.).

Among the other works of Griesbach (which are comparatively unimportant) may be mentioned his university thesis De codicibus quatuor evangeliorum Origenianis (Halle, 1771) and a work upon systematic theology (Anleitung zur Kenntniss der populären Dogmatik, Jena, 1779). His Opuscula, consisting chiefly of university "Programs" and addresses, were edited by Gabler (2 volumes, Jena, 1824).

== Gospel Synopsis ==
In 1776 Griesbach published his Greek Gospel synopsis of Matthew, Mark and Luke as a volume separate from his critical edition of the New Testament (cf. above), of which it had previously been a part, and thereby established the tool of a synopsis as an essential research aid in New Testament studies.

For Griesbach's hypothesis concerning the interrelation of the Gospel accounts of Matthew, Mark and Luke, and its modern variant, see Griesbach hypothesis.

== Bicentenary Colloquium ==
To mark the bicentenary of the publication of Griesbach's Gospel synopsis as a separate volume a group of distinguished international biblical scholars met in July 1976 at Münster/Westphalia for the Johann Jakob Griesbach Bicentenary Colloquium 1776–1976.

A selection of the papers presented at the colloquium appraising Griesbach's life, work and influence, aimed "to indicate why an understanding of this scholar's contribution to New Testament criticism is important both for the history of New Testament scholarship and for contemporary research", together with the text in Latin and in English translation of The Dissertation of J. J. Griesbach, Doctor of Theology and Principal Professor in the University of Jena, in which he demonstrates that the entire Gospel of Mark has been extracted from the Gospels of Matthew and Luke, written in the name of the University of Jena (1789–1790), now revised and furnished with many additions, are to be found in Bernard Orchard and Thomas R. W. Longstaff (ed.), J. J. Griesbach: Synoptic and Text-Critical Studies 1776-1976, Volume 34 in the SNTS Monograph Series (Cambridge University Press, hardback 1978, paperback 2005 ISBN 0-521-02055-7).

== Works ==
- Griesbach, Johann Jakob (1809). Novum Testamentum Graece. Quattuor Evangelia complectens [The Greek New Testament: Comprising the Four Gospels]. Vol. I. London: J. Mackinlay, Cuthell & Martin. p. 4.
- Griesbach, Johann Jakob (1818). Novum Testamentum Graece. Actas et Epistolas Apostolorum cum Apocalypsi complectens [The Greek New Testament: Comprising the Acts, and the Epistles of the Apostles with the Apocalypse]. Vol. 2. London: J. Mackinlay, Cuthell & Martin. p. 4.
- Griesbach, Johann Jakob; Leusden, Johannes (1817). Hē kainē diathēkē: Novum Testamentum Graece. Cura Leusdenii et Griesbachii [The New Testament: The Greek New Testament, As Presented by Leusden and Griesbach]. Glasgow: Andreae & Joannis M. Duncan.
- Griesbach, Johann Jakob; Leusden, Johannes (1823). Hē kainē diathēkē: Novum Testamentum Graece. Cura Leusdenii et Griesbachii [The New Testament: The Greek New Testament, As Presented by Leusden and Griesbach]. London: G & W. B. Whittaker.
- Griesbach, Johann Jakob (1793). Symbolae criticae ad supplendas et corrigendas variarum N. T. lectionum collectiones [Critical symbols to Supplement and Correct Various Collections of New Testament Readings]. Halle; London: I. Iac, Curtii Vidvae.
- The Four Gospels of the New Testament, in Greek, from the Text of Griesbach, with a Lexicon in English of all the Words Contained in them. Boston: Cummings, Hillard & Co. 1825.

== See also ==
- Gospel harmony
