= Christian Gottlob Wilke =

German theologian (1786–1854)

Christian Gottlob Wilke (May 13, 1786, in Badrina (in modern-day Schönwölkau) – November 10, 1854, in Würzburg) was a German theologian.

He studied philosophy and theology at the University of Leipzig, and from 1814 to 1819 served as a minister to a Saxon Landwehr installation. Afterwards he worked as a pastor in the hamlet of Hermannsdorf in the Ore Mountains.

In 1838 he settled in Dresden, where he published his first book, Der Urevangelist oder exegetisch kritische Untersuchung über das Verwandtschaftsverhältniß der drei ersten Evangelien (The Urevangelist, exegetical critical study on the relationship of the first three Gospels, 1838). In this work he asserted that the evangelist Mark was the "original evangelist" and was the source for the Gospels of Matthew and Luke. During the same time frame, philosopher Christian Hermann Weisse (1801-1866), independent of Wilke, came up with the same conclusion.

In the following years, Wilke published a New Testament lexicon called Clavis Novi Testamenti Philologica (1840–41, not to confuse with the anterior book of same title by Christian Abraham Wahl), a book involving New Testament rhetoric titled Die neutestamentliche Rhetorik (1842–43) and an influential study on New Testament hermeneutics called Die Hermeneutik des Neuen Testaments (1843–44).

Trained as a Lutheran, he converted to Roman Catholicism in 1846. Subsequently, he moved to Würzburg, where he worked on revisions of his earlier publications.

== Sources ==
- Wikisource translated biography @ Allgemeine Deutsche Biographie
