= Bernard Orchard =

British biblical scholar (1910–2006)

Bernard Orchard, OSB

Dom Bernard Orchard (3 May 1910 – 28 November 2006) was a British Catholic Benedictine monk, headmaster and biblical scholar.

== Early life and education ==
John Archibald Henslowe Orchard, the son of a farmer, was born in Bromley, Kent. He was educated at Ealing Priory School (to which he would in later life return as headmaster), and on leaving in 1927 became its first pupil since foundation in 1902 to go to university, winning a place at Fitzwilliam House, in the University of Cambridge, where he read History and Economics. At Ealing Priory he shared classes with Reginald C. Fuller with whom he would in later life collaborate on scholarly projects.

== Monk ==
After graduating, Orchard taught initially at a preparatory school before in 1932 taking the monastic habit at Downside Abbey, adopting the name Bernard; he was subsequently ordained as a priest in 1939. At Downside he both taught at the school, served as choirmaster and began his career as a biblical scholar under the tutelage of Abbots John Chapman and Christopher Butler. From 1943 he took advantage of the influence of Divino afflante Spiritu, the encyclical of Pope Pius XII, to embark upon A Catholic Commentary on Holy Scripture, eventually published in 1951.

== St. Benedict's School ==
After 13 years at Downside, then-Abbot Sigebert Trafford instructed Orchard to take on the headship of Ealing Priory School. Established in 1902 as a dependency of Downside, by 1945 it was in a state in which closure rather than further development seemed more likely. Notwithstanding, Orchard threw himself into the task of revitalising the school, which he renamed St Benedict's School, and by 1947 succeeded in obtaining recognition by the Ministry of Education as efficient (thus enabling it to participate in the teachers' pension scheme).

In 1951 Orchard was admitted to the Headmasters' Conference, giving St Benedict's the status of a public school, the only Catholic day school to achieve this position. By 1959, Abbot Rupert Hall of the by-then independent Ealing Abbey, was concerned that Orchard's ambitions for the school exceeded the financial capability of the monastic community, and requested that Orchard resign his position as headmaster in 1960. Orchard's successor died after just one term and the monk then appointed in his stead resigned after five years. This resulted in Orchard being called upon in 1965 to resume the post. He held until a further dispute over his ambitions for expansion led in 1969 to his resignation a second time.

== Biblical Scholar ==
After completing his biblical commentary in 1951, and in addition to his headmaster's duties, Orchard embarked with Reginald C. Fuller, his erstwhile fellow Ealing Priory pupil, on producing a new translation of the Bible, suitable for both liturgical and academic use, which was published in 1967. Aged 60, free from stewardship of the school, Orchard resumed his career as a biblical scholar in earnest. He participated in the establishment in 1969 and was the second General Secretary (1970–1972) of the World Catholic Federation and, displaying the same vigour evident in his revival of St Benedict's School, organised and financed a series of international conferences on the Gospels. During the 1970s he spent four years as spiritual director of the Beda College in Rome and took up the position of visiting professor of New Testament Studies at the University of Dallas (in Dallas, Texas) before returning to Ealing for the remainder of his life.

Following in the footsteps of his mentor Christopher Butler, Orchard promoted, in the face of general scholarly scepticism, the Griesbach hypothesis, which he renamed the Two-Gospel Hypothesis. This maintained that the Gospel of Matthew was the first and the Gospel of Mark the third, being a synthesis of Matthew's Gospel and the Gospel of Luke. Into his old age he remained a familiar face in biblical circles, lecturing worldwide in support of his hypothesis. Aged 95, he publicly declined the invitation of Cormac Murphy-O'Connor, the Archbishop of Westminster to attend a lecture which would support the priority of Mark's Gospel. Orchard's researches and ideas, regarding the Gospels, have been saved on www.churchinhistory.org

== Death ==
After leading the chant at midday on 28 November 2006, Orchard, aged 96, prayed at the bedside of the dying Dom Kevin Horsey. They were the last survivors of the Ealing community before it became independent in 1947. They died within hours of each other that night.

== Works ==
=== Books ===
- Orchard, Bernard (1976). Matthew, Luke & Mark. Griesbach solution to the synoptic question. Vol. 1. Manchester: Koinonia Press. ISBN 9780860880097. OCLC 3562922.
- ——— (1982). Synopsis of the Four Gospels in English.
- ——— (1983). Synopsis of the Four Gospels in Greek. Edinburgh: T. & T. Clark. ISBN 9780567093318. OCLC 9707458.
- ———; Riley, Harold (1987). The Order of the Synoptics: why three synoptic gospels?. Macon, GA: Mercer University Press. ISBN 9780865542228. OCLC 15283083.
- ——— (1990). The Evolution of the Gospels. CTS SC60. London: Incorporated Catholic Truth Society. ISBN 9780851837994. OCLC 59825652.
- ——— (1993). Born to be King - The Epic of the Incarnation (A theological application of the Matthean Priority Hypothesis. London: Ealing Abbey Scriptorium. ISBN 9780952210412. OCLC 29594819.
- ——— (1993). The Origin and Evolution of the Gospels. London: Ealing Abbey Scriptorium. ISBN 9780952210429. OCLC 315971139. - originally The evolution of the Gospels (1990)

=== Edited by ===
- ———, ed. (1951). A Catholic Commentary on Holy Scripture. New York: Thomas Nelson and Sons. OCLC 2657334.
- ———; Fuller, Reginald C., eds. (1966). The Holy Bible: containing the Old and New Testaments, Revised Standard Version, Catholic edition. Toronto: Thomas Nelson & Sons. OCLC 6699526.
- ———; Fuller, Reginald C., eds. (1973). The Common Bible. London.
- ———, ed. (1969). A New Catholic Commentary. London: Nelson. OCLC 668362759.

=== Chapters ===
- ——— (1979). "Ellipsis and Parenthesis in Gal 2:1-10 and 2 Thess 2:1-12". In Benelli, G.; De Lorenzi, Lorenzo (eds.). Paul de Tarse - Apotre de Notre Temps. Rome: Abbaye de S. Paul. OCLC 614071210.
- ——— (1979). "Some Guidelines for the Interpretation of Eusebius's Hist. Eccl. 3.34-39". In Weinrich, William C. (ed.). New Testament Age: essays in honor of Bo Reiche. Vol. II. Basle. pp. 393–403. OCLC 844929012.
- ——— (1990). "Response to H. Merkel (Ancient Patristic Testimony to the Gospels". In Dungan, David L.; Boismard, M. E.; Farmer, William Reuben; Neirynck, Frans (eds.). The Interrelations of the Gospels. Bibliotheca Ephemeridum theologicarum Lovaniensium. Vol. 95. Leuven: Leuven University Press. pp. 591–604. OCLC 638658231.
- ——— (1992). "Mark and the Fusion of Traditions". In Neirynck, Frans; van Segbroeck, Frans (eds.). The Four Gospels - Festschrift Frans Neirynck. Vol. 3. Leuven: Leuven University Press. pp. 779–800. ISBN 9789061864950. OCLC 60241515.
- ——— (1993). "The Publication of Mark's Gospel". In Focant, Camille (ed.). The Synoptic Gospels - Source Criticism and The New Literary Criticism. Bibliotheca ephemeridum theologicarum Lovaniensium. Vol. 110 (ed. Leuven: Leuven University Press. pp. 518–20. OCLC 902057788.

=== Journal articles ===
- ——— (1938). "Thessalonians and the Synoptic Gospels". Biblica. 19: 19–42.
- ——— (1938). "The Rejection of Christ". Downside Review. LVI: 410–26.
- ——— (1939). "The Persecution of Christ". Downside Review. LVII: 189–98.
- ——— (1939). "The Two Year Public Ministry Viewed and Reviewed". Downside Review. LVII: 308–39.
- ——— (1939). "St Paul and the Book of Daniel". Biblica. 20: 172–79.
- ——— (1942). "A Note on the Meaning of Galatians 2: 3-5". Journal of Theological Studies. 43: 173–77.
- ——— (1944). "A New Solution of the Galatians Problem". Bulletin of the John Rylands Library. 28: 154–74. doi:10.7227/BJRL.28.1.9.
- ——— (1945). "The Problem of Acts and Galatians". Catholic Biblical Quarterly. 7: 377–97.
- ——— (March 1973). "Prayers We have in Common: The Biblical Aspect". Worship. 47 (3): 144–49.
- ——— (1973). "The Meaning of ton epiousion (Mt 6:11 = Lk 11:3)". Biblical Theology Bulletin. III (3): 274–82.
- ——— (1973). "The Ellipsis between Galatians 2:3 and 2:4". Biblica. 54: 469–81.
- ——— (February 1974). "Priestly Training according to the Gospels". Omnis Terra (English Edition). 58.
- ——— (1976). "Once again the Ellipsis between Galatians 2:3 and 2:4". Biblica. 57: 254–55.
- ——— (1975–76). "John A. T. Robinson and the Synoptic Problem". New Testament Studies. 22: 346–452.
- ——— (1978). "JJ Griesbach: Synoptic and Text Critical Studies 1776-1976". Society for New Testament Studies.
- ——— (1978). "Are All Gospel Synopses Biased?". Theologische Zeitschrift. 34: 149–62.
- ——— (1979). "Why THREE Synoptic Gospels?". Irish Theological Quarterly. 46 (4).
- ——— (Winter 1987). "The Solution of the Synoptic Problem". Scripture Bulletin. XVIII (1).
- ——— (January 1988). "The Formation of the Synoptic Gospels". Downside Review. 106 (362): 1–16. doi:10.1177/001258068810636201. S2CID 134623493.
- ——— (1993). "The Making and Publication of Mark's Gospel: An Historical Investigation". Annales Theologici. 1: 369–93.
- ——— (1996). "Dei Verbum and the Synoptic Gospels". Downside Review. 108 (372): 199–213.
- ——— (October 1995). "Josephus and the Unnamed Priests of his Roman Mission". Downside Review. 113 (393): 248–70. doi:10.1177/001258069511339302. S2CID 163305477.
- ——— (October 2001). "The Bethrothal and Marriage of Mary to Joseph". Homiletic and Pastoral Review. CII (1).
- ——— (November 2001). "The Bethrothal and Marriage of Mary to Joseph". Homiletic and Pastoral Review. CII (2).
