= Biblica (journal) =

Academic journal published by the Pontifical Biblical Institute

- Discipline: Biblical studies
- Language: Multilingual
- Edited by: Dean Béchard

Publication details
- History: 1920–present
- Publisher: Pontifical Biblical Institute (Italy)
- Frequency: Quarterly

Standard abbreviations
- ISO 4: Biblica

Indexing
- ISSN: 0006-0887

Links
- Journal homepage

Biblica is an academic journal published by the Pontifical Biblical Institute. The editor-in-chief is Dean Béchard.
