= Reginald C. Fuller =

English Catholic priest and biblical scholar (1908–2011)

Reginald Cuthbert Fuller (12 September 1908 – 21 April 2011) was an English Catholic priest, biblical scholar and honorary Canon of Westminster Cathedral.

Born in London, he contributed significantly to the advancement of Catholic life and ecumenism in England during the 20th century, notably through co-founding the Catholic Biblical Association of Great Britain, his collaboration as an Editorial Committee member of the first one-volume Bible commentary for English-speaking Catholics and his General Editorship of its second edition, and his work as a member of the Revised Standard Version Bible Committee and as Co-Editor of the first complete Bible translation in modern English for Catholics from the Hebrew and the Greek, as well as of its ecumenical edition. His specialist subjects were the Deuterocanonical Books, on which he contributed articles to three major Biblical Commentaries (see "Publications" below), and the life and works of Alexander Geddes, a pioneer of biblical criticism, on which he wrote his doctoral thesis (see "Publications" below).

== Early life and education ==
Fuller was born on 12 September 1908. His parents, the physician and medical author Arthur William Fuller and Florence Margaret Fuller (née Montgomery), of St John's Wood, London, initially sent their son to Ealing Priory School (subsequently renamed St Benedict's School) where he happened to share classes and hone his Latin skills in competition with a younger pupil, later also a New Testament scholar, John Bernard Orchard, who would be Fuller's colleague on a number of academic projects. Recognizing their son's academic potential, the parents then decided upon a move to Cardinal Vaughan School, before sending him for the final years of his schooling to Ampleforth College.

== Seminary and academic studies ==
Fuller attended seminary studies at Allen Hall, St Edmund's College, Ware, Hertfordshire, from 1926 to 1931 and was ordained priest by Cardinal Francis Bourne, Archbishop of Westminster, at Westminster Cathedral in 1931. Studies at the Dominican University in Rome led to a licentiate in theology in 1933 and a doctorate in 1935, and courses at the Biblical Institute in the city culminated in a licentiate in Sacred Scripture in 1934. Later biblical research at Cambridge University during the years 1964–1968 lead to the award of a PhD.

== Pastoral appointments ==
At various times during 1950–1994 Father Fuller held pastoral appointments in the Archdiocese of Westminster. He served as Rector of the Church and Shrine of Our Lady of the Assumption and St Gregory, Warwick Street, London W1B 5LZ ("Warwick Street Church") (1950–1963), as Chaplain at Westminster Cathedral (1976–1978), and as Rector of the Church of the Blessed Sacrament, Islington (1978–1983). After his retirement he served as Assistant Priest at the Church of St Mellitus, Tollington Park, London (1983–1990 (where on one occasion in the sacristy he was attacked by intruders and hit over the head with a crucifix but suffered no lasting injury), and at the Church of Our Lady and St Joseph, Poplar, London (1990–1994). Thereafter he took up residence at Clergy House at Westminster Cathedral, regularly hearing Confessions at the Cathedral and helping with occasional exhibitions. In 2003 he moved to Nazareth House, where on request he continued to provide spiritual guidance to his visitors on an individual basis.

== Teaching appointments ==
Fuller was lecturer in Biblical Studies at Allen Hall, St Edmund's College, Ware, Hertfordshire, from 1936 to 1949, for the Newman Association from 1950 to 1954, and at St Mary's College, Strawberry Hill, Twickenham, from 1968 to 1972. He then spent three years in Kenya as lecturer in Old Testament Studies at the University of Nairobi from 1972 to 1975. While there he availed himself of the opportunity to indulge some of his recreational interests and with members of the university staff went mountain climbing and visited Mount Kenya and the Ngorongoro Crater, and admired the wild-life in Serengeti/Tanzania and the Victoria Falls in Zimbabwe.

== Other professional activities ==
From 1949 to 1990 Fuller was a member of the Society of Old Testament Studies (SOTS). Among his involvement in major professional projects was the co-founding of the Catholic Biblical Association of Great Britain, of which he then was Hon. Secretary from 1940 to 1965 and chairman from 1968 to 1982. As representative of the association, he acted in 1963 as promoter of a revised English spelling of biblical names for Catholic use before the Conference of Bishops of England and Wales (e.g. Noah, Elijah, Joshua, in place of Noe, Elias, Josue as found in the Douay-Challoner Bible, based on the Latin text).

Fuller was invited by Dom Bernard Orchard to be a member of the editorial committee of the first one-volume Bible commentary for English-speaking Catholics, entitled A Catholic Commentary on Holy Scripture (CCHS, 1953 ); and the Westminster diocese entrusted Fuller in 1951 with the office of censor deputatus for the nihil obstat in its regard (cf. CCHS, p. iv). When subsequent developments – among them the study of the manuscripts discovered in the caves at Qumran and the Second Vatican Council – required an updating of the commentary, he was general editor of its second edition, entitled A New Catholic Commentary on Holy Scripture (1969).

He was, moreover, co-editor of the first complete Bible translation in modern English for Catholics from the Hebrew and Greek, entitled The Holy Bible – Revised Standard Version Catholic Edition (1966), and its ecumenical counterpart, The Common Bible (1973). He was a member of the Revised Standard Version Bible Committee from 1969 to 1980 and of the Joint Committee on the Revised English Bible from 1979 to 1989. From 1946 to 1953 he was the editor of the quarterly journal, Scripture.

== Personal life and death ==
Fuller celebrated his 100th birthday in 2008. He died 21 April 2011, aged 102.

== Publications ==
In addition to many articles and book reviews that Fuller contributed to specialist journals, e.g. Scripture Bulletin, Priests and People, The Tablet. He wrote articles on the Deuterocanonical Books for A Catholic Commentary on Holy Scripture (1953), A New Catholic Commentary on Holy Scripture (1966), and International Catholic Bible Commentary (1996), and the articles "Alexander Geddes, 1737–1802" and "Mythology and Biblical Studies to 1800" for Dictionary of Biblical Interpretation (1999).

His PhD thesis was published in 1984 under the title Alexander Geddes: A Pioneer of Biblical Criticism, 1737–1802.

He outlined the history of the Church and Shrine of Our Lady of the Assumption and St Gregory, better known as "Warwick Street Church", where he had been a Rector from 1950 to 1963, in a small illustrated book entitled Steadfast in Loyalty – Warwick Street Church – A Short History and Guide (1956, 1973).

His friendship with Leonard Cheshire led to his editing a slender volume providing an insight into Cheshire's spiritual resources during his struggle with the effects of motor neurone disease, entitled Crossing the Finishing Line – Last Thoughts of Leonard Cheshire VC (1998, ISBN 0-85439-527-X, see pp. 7–14, 80).

== Sources ==
- Who's Who in Catholic Life (2005)
