= Gospel of Marcion =

Text used by the mid-2nd-century Marcion of Sinope

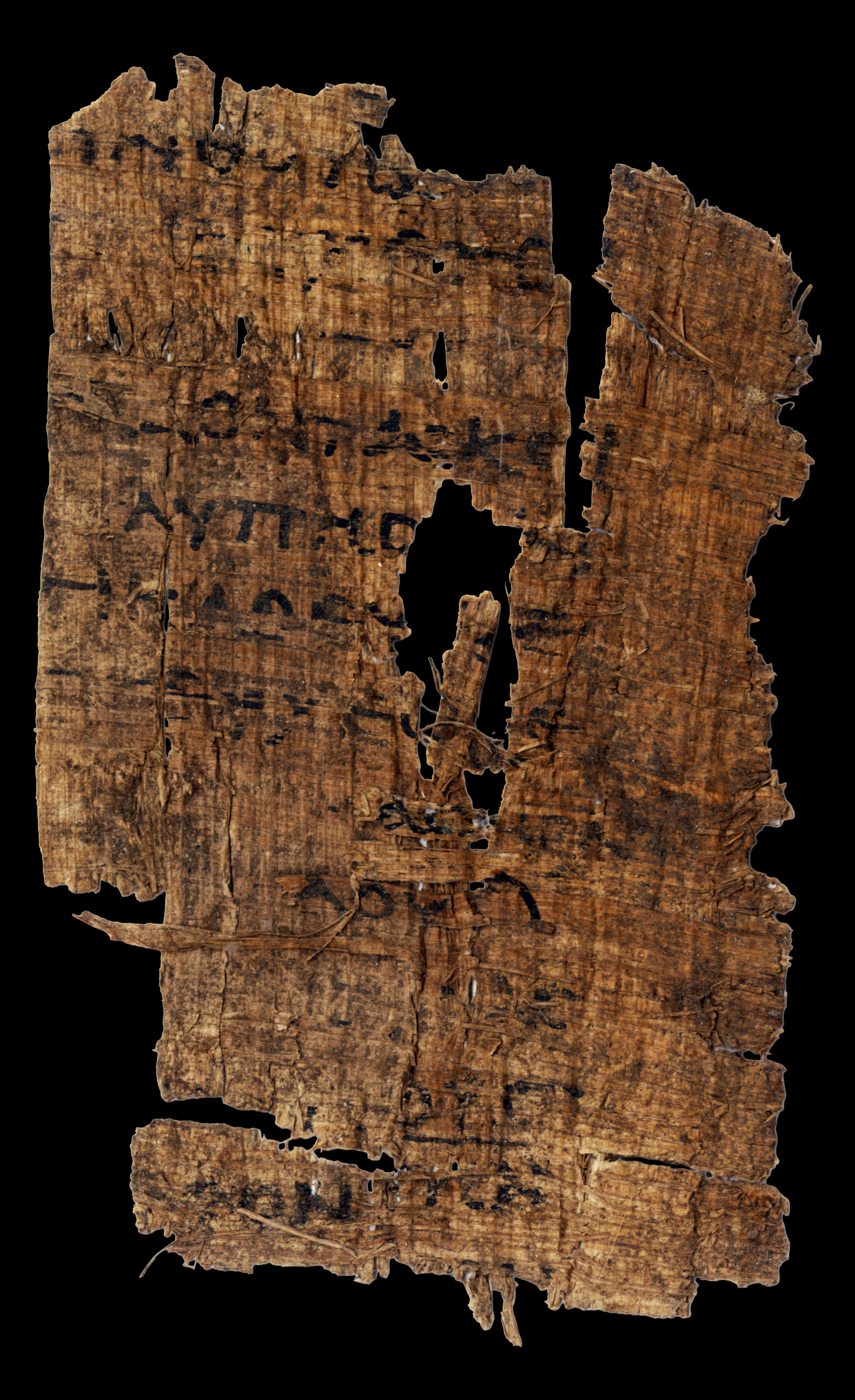
Claire Clivaz has argued that Papyrus 69 is "a witness to a Marcionite edition of Luke's Gospel".

The Gospel of Marcion, called by its adherents the Gospel of the Lord, or more commonly the Gospel (Evangelion), was a text used by the mid-2nd-century Christian teacher Marcion of Sinope to the exclusion of the other gospels. The majority of scholars agree that this gospel was a later revised version of the Gospel of Luke.

There are debates as to whether several verses of Marcion's gospel are attested firsthand in a manuscript in Papyrus 69, a hypothesis proposed by Claire Clivaz and put into practice by Jason BeDuhn. Thorough, meticulous, yet highly divergent reconstructions of much or all of the content of the Gospel of Marcion have been made by several scholars, including August Hahn (1832), Theodor Zahn (1892), Adolf von Harnack (1921), Kenji Tsutsui (1992), Jason BeDuhn (2013), Dieter T. Roth (2015), Matthias Klinghardt (2015/2020, 2021), and Andrea Nicolotti (2019).

== Contents ==
Reconstructions of the text of Marcion's Gospel make careful use of second-hand quotations and paraphrases to the text as found in anti-Marcionite writings by orthodox Christian apologists, especially Tertullian, Epiphanius, and the Dialogue of Adamantius. Of these secondary witnesses, Tertullian contributes the most material and references, Epiphanius the second most, and the Dialogue of Adamantius the third most. All these authors compared the Gospel of Marcion with that of Luke, and highlighted the fact that it missed or altered certain passages.

Like the Gospel of Mark, Marcion's gospel lacked any nativity story. Luke's account of the baptism of Jesus was also absent. The gospel began, roughly, as follows:

In the fifteenth year of Tiberius Caesar, Pontius Pilate being governor of Judea, Jesus descended into Capernaum, a city in Galilee, and was teaching on the Sabbath days. (cf. Luke 3:1a, 4:31)

Other Lukan passages that did not appear in Marcion's gospel include the parables of the Good Samaritan and the Prodigal Son.

While Marcion preached that the God who had sent Jesus Christ was an entirely new, alien god, distinct from the God who had created the world, this view was not explicitly taught in Marcion's gospel. The Gospel of Marcion is, however, much more amenable to a Marcionite interpretation than the canonical Gospel of Luke, because it lacks many of the passages in Luke that explicitly link Jesus with Judaism, such as the parallel birth narratives of John the Baptist and Jesus in Luke 1–2.

== Three hypotheses on the gospels of Marcion and Luke ==
There are three main hypotheses concerning the relationship between the gospel of Marcion and the gospel of Luke:

1. Marcion's Evangelion derives from Luke by a process of reduction (The Patristic Hypothesis).

2. Luke derives from Marcion's Evangelion by a process of expansion (The Schwegler Hypothesis).

3. Marcion's Evangelion and Luke are both independent developments of a common proto-gospel (The Semler Hypothesis).

=== Patristic hypothesis ===
The proto-orthodox and orthodox Church Fathers maintained that Marcion edited Luke to fit his own theology, Marcionism, and the majority of modern scholars such as Bruce M. Metzger and Roth have maintained this as well. The late 2nd-century writer Tertullian stated that Marcion, "expunged [from the Gospel of Luke] all the things that oppose his view... but retained those things that accord with his opinion".

Christopher Hays contends that Klinghardt's 2006 case made a number of philological errors, misunderstood the nature of how Marcion is contended to have redacted Luke, and offered an inconsistent case that Luke had redacted Marcion. For example, while one argument for Marcionite priority over Luke rests on the claim that it is unlikely that Marcion deleted significant portions of Luke, rather than Luke having expanded significant portions of Marcion, Hays held that Marcion also deleted significant portions of Paul's letters to create his Apostolikon. Thus, Hays sees it as special pleading to acknowledge that Marcion edited down Paul and to also hold that Marcion did not edit down Luke.

Francis Watson notes that several changes the Evangelion makes to the Gospel of Luke are clearly secondary, rendering Marcionite Priority improbable. For instance, Luke 11:42 condemns the Pharisees for neglecting the justice or judgment and love of God, while the Evangelion associates divine love with calling rather than judgement in line with Marcionite ideology.

Dieter Roth has responded to Markus Vinzent's thesis (that Marcion was the author of the first Gospel and that the four canonical Gospels only came after it). According to Roth, Vinzent advances this thesis based on a number of misreadings of Tertullian.

Bart D. Ehrman notes that "Tertullian, Epiphanius, and other ancient witnesses" support this claim. He does not take a side, stating, "These claims are precisely what we would have expected from the two rival camps, and neither set of them deserves much consideration."

According to this view, Marcion eliminated the first two chapters of Luke concerning the nativity, and began his gospel at Capernaum making modifications to the remainder suitable to Marcionism. The differences in the texts below are interpreted by advocates of this hypothesis as evidence of Marcion editing Luke to omit the Hebrew Prophets and to better support a dualistic view of the earth as evil.

Comparable passages in Luke and Marcion
Luke	Marcion's Gospel
O foolish and slow of heart to believe in all that the prophets have spoken (24:25)	O foolish and hard of heart to believe in all that I have told you (24:25)
They began to accuse him, saying, 'We found this man perverting our nation' (23:2)	They began to accuse him, saying, 'We found this man perverting our nation [...] and destroying the law and the prophets.' (23:2)
I thank you, Father, Lord of heaven and earth (10:21)	I thank you, heavenly Father... (10:21)

Late 19th- and early 20th-century theologian Adolf von Harnack, in agreement with the traditional account of Marcion as revisionist, theorized that Marcion believed there could be only one true gospel, all others being fabrications by pro-Jewish elements, determined to sustain worship of Yahweh; and that the true gospel was given directly to Paul the Apostle by Christ himself, but was later corrupted by those same elements who also corrupted the Pauline epistles. In this understanding, Marcion saw the attribution of this gospel to Luke the Evangelist as a fabrication, so he began what he saw as a restoration of the original gospel as given to Paul. Harnack wrote that:

For this task he did not appeal to a divine revelation, any special instruction, nor to a pneumatic assistance [...] From this it immediately follows that for his purifications of the text – and this is usually overlooked – he neither could claim nor did claim absolute certainty.

=== Semler hypothesis and Schwegler hypothesis ===
A "long line of scholars" have rejected the traditional view that the Gospel of Marcion was a revision of the Gospel of Luke, and instead argued that it reflects an early version of Luke later expanded into its canonical form. These scholars see a consistent pattern running in the opposite direction, that Marcion's Gospel usually attests simpler, earlier textual traditions than corresponding content in canonical Luke both at the micro- and macro-level. The following examples (all attested by Greek witnesses to the Gospel of Marcion) illustrate this point of view.

Comparable passages in Luke and Marcion
Canonical Luke	Marcion's Gospel
Rejoice in that day and leap for joy, for surely your reward is great in heaven; for that is what their fathers did to the prophets. (6:23)	Your fathers have done the same already to the prophets. (6:23)
O faithless and perverse generation, how long will I be with you and endure you? (9:41)	Faithless generation! How long must I put up with you? (9:41)
That slave who knew what his master wanted, but did not prepare himself or do what was wanted, will receive a severe beating. (12:47)	For the slave who knew yet did not act will be flogged many times (12:47)

Scholars who reject the Patristic hypothesis defend either of the two hypotheses. One group argues that both gospels are independent redactions of a "proto-Luke", with Marcion's text being closer to the original proto-Luke. This position is called the Semler hypothesis after the name of its creator, Johann Salomo Semler. This position has been supported by scholars such as Josias F.C. Loeffler, Johann E.C. Schmidt, Leonhard Bertholdt, Johann Gottfried Eichhorn, John Knox, Karl Reinhold Köstlin, Joseph B. Tyson, and Jason BeDuhn. The other group argues that the Gospel of Luke is a later redaction of the Gospel of Marcion that significantly revised and expanded it. This position is called the Schwegler hypothesis after its creator Albert Schwegler. This position has been supported by scholars such as Albrecht Ritschl, Ferdinand Christian Baur, Paul-Louis Couchoud, Georges Ory, John Townsend, R. Joseph Hoffman, Matthias Klinghardt, Markus Vinzent, and David Trobisch.

Several arguments have been put forward in favor of those two latter views.

Firstly, there are many passages found in reconstructions of Marcion's gospel (based on comments of his detractors) that seem to contradict Marcion's own theology, which would be unexpected if Marcion was simply removing passages from Luke with which he did not agree. Matthias Klinghardt (in 2008) and Jason BeDuhn (in 2012) have both made this argument in detail.

Secondly, Marcion is attested to have claimed that the gospel he used was original and that the canonical Luke was a falsification. The accusations of alteration are therefore mutual.

Thirdly, John Knox and Joseph Tyson (both using Harnack's edition), and more recently Daniel A. Smith (using Roth's edition), have all put forth statistical analyses showing that Lukan single traditions are disproportionately lacking in the Gospel of Marcion, while double and triple traditions are disproportionately present. They argue that this result makes sense if canonical Luke added new material to Marcion's gospel or its source, but that it is unlikely if Marcion removed material from Luke.

There are more nuanced variations and combinations of these hypotheses. Knox and Tyson, for example, follow the Semler hypothesis in general, but still posit with the Patristic hypothesis that Marcion removed some passages. Pier Angelo Gramaglia, in his critical translation of Klinghardt's edition, concurs with the overall direction of the Semler and Schwegler hypotheses, but has argued on philological grounds that the Gospel of Marcion and Luke are two successive editions by the same editor. Like several 19th-century scholars, Knox, Tyson, Vinzent, and Klinghardt have extended the Schwegler hypothesis to include the canonical Book of Acts, arguing that it is an anti-Marcionite work.

Judith Lieu argues that Marcion had access and edited a work extremely similar to the Canonical Gospel of Luke, though this older work would have lacked certain passages. As such the currently extant Gospel of Luke would have appeared after the Gospel of Marcion.

== As a version of Mark ==
In 2008, Matthias Klinghardt proposed that Marcion's gospel was based on the Gospel of Mark, that the Gospel of Matthew was an expansion of the Gospel of Mark with reference to the Gospel of Marcion, and that the Gospel of Luke was an expansion of the Gospel of Marcion with reference to the Gospels of Matthew and Mark. In Klinghardt's view, this model elegantly accounts for the double tradition— material shared by Matthew and Luke, but not Mark— without appealing to purely hypothetical documents, such as the Q source. In his 2015 book, Klinghardt changed his opinion compared to his 2008 article. In his 2015 book, he considers that the gospel of Marcion precedes and influenced the four gospels (Matthew, Mark, Luke, and John).

== As a two source gospel ==
In his 2013 book, BeDuhn argued that understanding Marcion's Gospel as the first two source gospel, drawing on Q and Mark, resolves many of the problems of the traditional Q hypothesis, including its narrative introduction and the minor agreements. Pier Angelo Gramaglia, in his 2017 critical commentary on Klinghardt's reconstruction, made an extended argument that Marcion's Gospel is a two-source gospel, making use of Mark and Q, while canonical Luke builds on Marcion's Gospel in part from a secondary appropriation of Q material. Research from 2018 suggests that the Gospel of Marcion may have been the original two-source gospel based on Q and Mark.

== As the first gospel ==
The Marcion hypothesis proposed by Klinghardt

In his 2014 book Marcion and the Dating of the Synoptic Gospels, Markus Vinzent considers, like Klinghardt, that the gospel of Marcion precedes the four gospels (Matthew, Mark, Luke, and John). He believes that the Gospel of Marcion influenced the four gospels. Vinzent differs with both BeDuhn and Klinghardt in that he believes the Gospel of Marcion was written directly by Marcion: Marcion's gospel was first written as a draft not meant for publication which was plagiarized by the four canonical gospels; this plagiarism angered Marcion who saw the purpose of his text distorted and made him publish his gospel along with a preface (the Antithesis) and 10 letters of Paul. However, James Barker finds Vinzent's case “wholly unconvincing”, citing Clare Rothschild's review relegating his monograph to “a nonscientific genre.”

The Marcion priority also implies a model of the late dating of the New Testament Gospels to the 2nd century – a thesis that goes back to David Trobisch, who, in 1996 in his habilitation thesis accepted in Heidelberg, presented the conception or thesis of an early, uniform final editing of the New Testament canon in the 2nd century.

== The Apostolic ==
In addition to the Gospel, Marcion's canon included the Apostolic (Apostolikon), a list of epistles said to be authored by Paul. Marcion was the first to collect the various writings attributed to Paul, which had been circulating independently from one another, into a single document. Compared to the later orthodox canon, which contains thirteen Pauline epistles, Marcion's one included only ten (Romans, 1 Corinthians, 2 Corinthians, Galatians, Colossians, Philippians, 1 Thessalonians, 2 Thessalonians, Philemon and Laodiceans, the latter being a modified version of Ephesians).

The Pastoral epistles (1 Timothy, 2 Timothy, Titus) and the Epistle to the Hebrews (which is anonymous but was later attributed to Paul) were not featured. Some passages of the epistles which contradicted Marcion's theology (such as Jesus being descended from David or references to the Covenant with Abraham) were either non-original or expunged.

Marcion's treatment of the epistles, and his exclusion of portions which are likely to be original and authentic, has led some scholars to see his Gospel as a product of a likewise alteration of a pre-existing work, and to reject Marcionite priority.

== See also ==
- List of Gospels
- Marcion hypothesis
