= Priority of the Gospel of Marcion =

Biblical hypothesis about the gospel of Marcion

Theory Information
- Order: Marcion; John, Matt, Mark; Luke
- Additional Sources: Gospel of Marcion

Theory History
- Proponents: Markus Vinzent, Matthias Klinghardt
- Opponents: Christopher Hays

Marcion Priority is the hypothesis that the Gospel of Marcion precedes all four canonical gospels in production or composition and was used a source for some or all of them; it is an attempted solution to the synoptic problem. While there are some modern proponents of this hypothesis such as Matthias Klinghardt, the majority of scholars agree with the traditional Patristic view that the Gospel of Marcion was a revised version of the Gospel of Luke.

== Context ==
Marcion of Sinope (c. 85 – c. 160) is considered to be the founder of an early Christian movement called Marcionism. He is regarded by numerous scholars as having produced the first New Testament canon which included a gospel, called the Evangelion (or Euangelion), which he either acquired or significantly developed, or even fully wrote. Some have called it or even still call it the Gospel of Marcion.

Some Church Fathers said that the Marcionite Evangelion was a revision of the gospel of Luke with some passages expunged from it to fit Marcion's theology; this hypothesis on the relationship between the gospels of Marcion and of Luke is called the patristic hypothesis. However, some scholars have argued that the Marcionite gospel preceded the gospel of Luke and that the gospel of Luke is a revision of the Gospel of Marcion: the Schwegler hypothesis. Others argue that the Marcionite Evangelion and the gospel of Luke are two independent versions of another, prior gospel-text, with the gospel of Marcion being 'more faithful' to such a source than the gospel of Luke, or even being an unaltered version of that proposed source (the Semler hypothesis). Some go further and propose that the Gospel of Marcion was the very first gospel ever produced, preceding all others including the gospels of Matthew, Mark, Luke, and John (the Marcion priority hypothesis).

"[T]here has been a long line of scholars" who, against what the Church Fathers said, claimed "that our canonical Luke forms an enlarged version of a 'Proto-Luke' which was also used by Marcion. This dispute [...] was especially vivid in nineteenth century German scholarship". In 1942, John Knox published his, Marcion and the New Testament, in which he proposed that the gospel of Marcion had the chronological priority over Luke. No defence of this theory was made again until two 2006 articles: one by Joseph Tyson, and one by Matthias Klinghardt. "Knox and Tyson believe that Marcion used and falsified 'Proto-Luke'", while Klinghardt, who, at that time, did not propose that the gospel of Marcion was the very first gospel ever produced, asserted "that Marcion used Proto-Luke as he found it, that is, Marcion's Gospel and 'Proto-Luke' are identical".

== Chronology ==
=== Gospel of Marcion preceding Canonical Luke ===
Some scholars, such as Judith Lieu, argue that the Gospel of Marcion precedes the extant form of Canonical Luke either in composition or in wide circulation.

=== Gospel of Marcion as preceding the Canonical Gospels ===
In his 2013 book, The First New Testament: Marcion's Scriptural Canon, Jason BeDuhn said he considers that the gospel of Marcion was not produced or adapted by Marcion, but instead that the Gospel of Marcion was a preexisting gospel adopted by Marcion and his movement. He believes that: "On the whole, the differences between Luke and the Evangelion [i.e. the Gospel of Marcion] resist explanation on ideological grounds, and point instead toward Semler's original suggestion 250 years ago: the two gospels could be alternative versions adapted for primarily Jewish and primarily Gentile readers, respectively. In other words, the differences served practical, mission-related purposes rather than ideological, sectarian ones. Under such a scenario, the Evangelion would be transmitted within exactly the wing of emerging Christianity in which we can best situate Marcion’s own religious background". Semler's hypothesis being that "the Evangelion and Luke are both pre-Marcionite versions going back to a common original".

In his 2014 book Marcion and the Dating of the Synoptic Gospels, Markus Vinzent proposed, based on his interpretation of aspects of Tertullian's Against Marcion (and other works of Tertullian), that the Marcionite Evangelion was first written as a document "for his classroom (without Antitheses and perhaps without Paul's letters)," i.e. not meant for publication, but which was circulated and plagiarized by the four canonical gospels authors; and that, in response to that plagiarism, Marcion wrote an Antitheses and published it along with his gospel and a ten letter collection of the Pauline epistles. That is, a first edition of an Evangelion Marcion had (or even wrote) preceded the four canonical gospels—Matthew, Mark, Luke, and John—and that it influenced the four canonical gospel writers and hence the four canonical gospels they wrote (and that Marcion produced a second edition of his Evangelion along with his response).

In a study published in a 2015 book in German, Matthias Klinghardt had changed his mind comparing to his 2008 article in which he had said that the Marcionite gospel was based on the Gospel of Mark, that the Gospel of Matthew was an expansion of the Gospel of Mark with reference to the Gospel of Marcion, and that the Gospel of Luke was an expansion of the Gospel of Marcion with reference to the Gospels of Matthew and Mark. In that 2015 book (subsequently published in English), Klinghardt shared the same opinion as BeDuhn and Vinzent on the priority and influence of the Marcionite gospel. Like Vinzent, he proposed that the Gospel of Marcion preceded and influenced the four canonical gospels: Matthew, Mark, Luke, and John. Klinghardt and BeDuhn reaffirmed their opinions in two 2017 articles.

The Marcion priority hypothesis implies the dating of the New Testament Gospels to the mid 2nd century – a thesis that goes back to David Trobisch, who, in 1996 in his habilitation thesis accepted in Heidelberg, presented a thesis of an early, uniform final editing of the New Testament canon in the 2nd century.

== Criticism ==
The majority of scholars view the Gospel of Marcion as a second century work that edited the canonical Gospel of Luke rather than agreeing with arguments like Vinzent's to the contrary.

Christopher Hays contends that Klinghardt's 2006 case made a number of philological errors, misunderstood the nature of how Marcion is contended to have redacted Luke, and offered an inconsistent case that Luke had redacted Marcion. For example, while one argument for Marcionite priority over Luke rests on the claim that it is unlikely that Marcion deleted significant portions of Luke, rather than Luke having expanded significant portions of Marcion, Hays held that Marcion also deleted significant portions of Paul's letters to create his Apostolikon. Thus, Hays sees it as special pleading to acknowledge that Marcion edited down Paul and to also hold that Marcion did not edit down Luke.

Francis Watson notes that several changes the Evangelion makes to the Gospel of Luke are clearly secondary, rendering Marcionite Priority improbable. For instance, Luke 11:42 condemns the Pharisees for neglecting the justice or judgment and love of God, while the Evangelion associates divine love with calling rather than judgement in line with Marcionite ideology.

Sebastian Moll has said that all surviving sources say that Marcion is the one who edited Luke, and therefore the burden of proof is on advocates of Marcionite priority to provide the counter-argument.

Dieter Roth has responded to Markus Vinzent's thesis (that Marcion was the author of the first Gospel and that the four canonical Gospels only came after it). According to Roth, Vinzent advances this thesis based on a number of misreadings of Tertullian.

Simon Gathercole assumes that a text like canonical Luke was the source edited by Marcion, made probable by his editing of the Pauline epistles, canonical Luke containing almost of the Marcionite Gospel's content, extensive verbatim agreements between Luke and Marcion mediating against a common source in favor of one's usage of the other, and the presence of Lukan language and style in Marcion's gospel.

James Barker finds Vinzent's case “wholly unconvincing”, citing Clare Rothschild's review relegating his monograph to “a nonscientific genre.”

== See also ==
- Farrer hypothesis
- Griesbach hypothesis
- Markan priority
- Synoptic problem
- Two-source hypothesis
