= P126 =

P126 may refer to:

- BRM P126, a Formula One racing car
- Papyrus 126, a biblical manuscript
- TCG Bornova (P-126), a patrol boat of the Turkish Navy
- P126, a state regional road in Latvia
