= Marcionism =

Early Christian dualistic theology

Marcionism or Marcionite Christianity was an early Christian dualistic belief system originating with the teachings of Marcion of Sinope in Rome around 144 AD. Marcion was an early Christian theologian, evangelist, and an important figure in early Christianity. Marcion was born between about 85 and 100 and died around 160. He is reported to have been the son of a bishop of Sinope in Pontus, though nearly all biographical detail about him derives from hostile sources and from a "heretic legend" that later writers extrapolated from his works; Sinope itself first appears as his birthplace in late antique sources. About the middle of the 2nd century (140–155) he traveled to Rome. Irenaeus and other patristic writers present him there as a follower of the Syrian gnostic Cerdo, from whom he is said to have taken the doctrines of the evil creator and the alien good God, but recent scholarship regards the derivation as uncertain and probably unhistorical. Marcion preached that the benevolent God of the Gospel who sent Jesus into the world as the savior was the true Supreme Being, different and opposed to the malevolent deity, the Demiurge or creator deity, identified with Yahweh in the Hebrew Bible. He considered himself a follower of Paul the Apostle, whom he believed to have been the only true apostle of Jesus.

Marcion's canon, possibly the first Christian biblical canon ever compiled, consisted of eleven books: the Gospel of Marcion, which was a shorter version of the Gospel of Luke, and ten Pauline epistles. Marcion's canon rejected the entire Old Testament, along with all other epistles and gospels of what would become the 27-book canon of the New Testament, which during his life had yet to be compiled.

Marcionism was denounced by its opponents as heresy and written against by the Church Fathers – notably by Tertullian in his five-book treatise Adversus Marcionem (Against Marcion) in about 208. Marcion's writings are lost, though they were widely read and numerous manuscripts must have existed. Even so, many scholars say it is possible to reconstruct a large part of ancient Marcionism through what later critics, especially Tertullian, said concerning Marcion. The movement was widespread, which forced rivalling sects to begin making defences. Marcionites founded Churches across the Roman empire, and their decline is attributed to state intervention by later imperial edicts banning all groups deemed heretical from assembly.

== History ==
According to Tertullian and other writers of early proto-orthodox Christianity, the movement known as Marcionism began with the teachings and excommunication of Marcion around 144. The reason provided by hostile accounts was potentially for being schismatic. Marcion was reportedly a wealthy shipowner, the son of a bishop of Sinope in Pontus, Anatolia. He arrived in Rome c. 139-140, soon after the Bar Kokhba revolt, and is said to have contributed 200,000 sestertius to the church, using his personal wealth to fund an ecclesiastical organization. Marcionism continued to thrive for around 300 years, although Marcionite ideas may have persisted much longer. The organization continued for some centuries later outside the Byzantine Empire in areas which later would be dominated by Manichaeism, particularly as the Sasanian Empire.

=== Schism within Marcionism ===
By the reign of emperor Commodus (180–192), Marcionism was divided into various opinions with various leaders; among whom was Apelles, whom Rhodo describes as "priding himself on his manner of life and his age, acknowledges one principle, but says that the prophecies are from an opposing principle, being led to this view by the responses of a maiden by name Philumene, who was possessed by a demon". However, "others, among whom were Potitus and Basilicus, held to two principles, as did Marcion himself. Others consider that there are not only two, but three natures. Of these, Syneros was the leader and chief.”

In the early 3rd century, a splinter group of Marcionites was established by Prepon the Syrian, who claimed the existence of an intermediate spiritual entity between the good and evil gods.

== Teachings ==
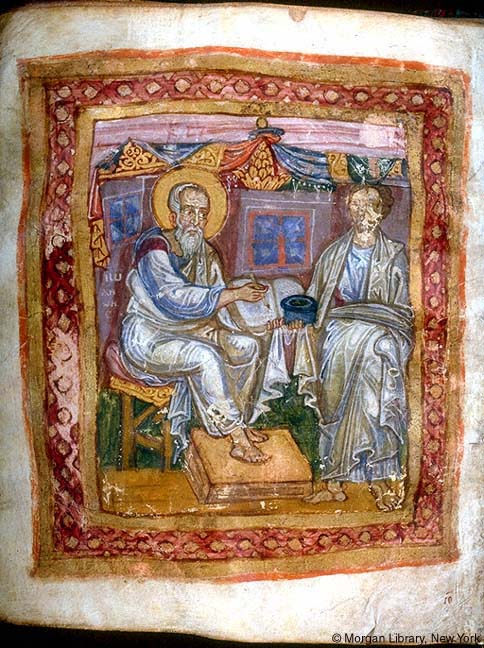
Marcion of Sinope (according to Robert Eisler's interpretation) depicted with the Apostle John

The premise of Marcionism is that the ministry of Jesus is incompatible with the actions of God in the Old Testament. Focusing on the Pauline traditions, Marcion felt that all other conceptions of the Gospel, and especially any association with Israelite religion, was opposed to, and a backsliding from, the truth. He further regarded the arguments of Paul regarding Law and Gospel, wrath and grace, works and faith, flesh and spirit, sin and righteousness, death and life, as the essence of religious truth. He ascribed these aspects and characteristics to two principles, the righteous and wrathful God of the Old Testament, who is at the same time identical with the creator of the world, and a second God of the Gospel who is only love and mercy.

The character of the creator in Marcion's system is disputed. On the reading long dominant since Adolf von Harnack, Marcion opposed a merely just and wrathful demiurge to the wholly good God of the gospel; Sebastian Moll has argued instead that the contrast is between a good and an evil God, and that Marcion did not seek to discard the Old Testament but treated it as the foundation of his theology. On either reading the demiurge is not a principled adversary of the alien God, and the material creation is not held to be satanic but only as good as a world constituted by law and punishment can be.

In the God of the [Old Testament] he saw a being whose character was stern justice, and therefore anger, contentiousness and unmercifulness. The law which rules nature and man appeared to him to accord with the characteristics of this God and the kind of law revealed by him, and this God is the creator and lord of the world (κοσμοκράτωρ [English transliteration: kosmokrator/cosmocrator]). As the law which governs the world is inflexible and yet, on the other hand, full of contradictions, just and again brutal, and as the law of the Old Testament exhibits the same features, so the God of creation was to Marcion a being who united in himself the whole gradations of attributes from justice to malevolence, from obstinacy to inconsistency."

In Marcionite belief, Jesus was not a Jewish Messiah, but a spiritual entity that was sent by the Monad to reveal the truth about existence, thus allowing humanity to escape the earthly trap of the demiurge. Marcion called God 'the Stranger God', or 'the Alien God' in some translations, as this deity had not had any previous interactions with the world, and was wholly unknown, similar to the Unknown God of Hellenism and the Areopagus sermon.

Various popular sources count Marcion among the Gnostics. The Oxford Dictionary of the Christian Church (3rd ed.) puts it, "it is clear that he would have had little sympathy with their mythological speculations" (p. 1034). In 1911 Henry Wace stated:

A modern divine would turn away from the dreams of Valentinianism in silent contempt; but he could not refuse to discuss the question raised by Marcion, whether there is such opposition between different parts of what he regards as the word of God, that all cannot come from the same author.

A primary difference between Marcionites and Gnostics was that the Gnostics based their theology on secret wisdom (as, for example, Valentinus, who claimed to have received the secret wisdom from Theudas, who had received it directly from Paul) of which they claimed to be in possession. In contrast, Marcion based his theology on the contents of the Letters of Paul and the recorded sayings of Jesus—in other words, an argument from scripture, with Marcion defining what was and was not scripture. Also, the Christology of the Marcionites is thought to have been primarily Docetic, denying the human nature of Jesus. This may have been due to the Marcionites' unwillingness to believe that Jesus was the son of both God the Father and the demiurge. Scholars of Early Christianity disagree on whether to classify Marcion as a Gnostic: Adolf von Harnack does not classify Marcion as a Gnostic, whereas G. R. S. Mead does. Harnack argued that Marcion was not a Gnostic in the strict sense because Marcion rejected elaborate creation myths, and did not claim to have special revelation or secret knowledge. Mead claimed Marcionism makes certain points of contact with Gnosticism in its view that the creator of the material world is not the true deity, rejection of materialism and affirmation of a transcendent, purely good spiritual realm in opposition to the evil physical realm, the belief the "True" God sent Jesus to save humanity, the central role of Jesus in revealing the requirements of salvation, the belief Paul had a special place in the transmission of this "wisdom", and its docetism. According to the 1911 Encyclopædia Britannica article on Marcion:

It was no mere school for the learned, disclosed no mysteries for the privileged, but sought to lay the foundation of the Christian community on the pure gospel, the authentic institutes of Christ. The pure gospel, however, Marcion found to be everywhere more or less corrupted and mutilated in the Christian circles of his time. His undertaking thus resolved itself into a reformation of Christendom. This reformation was to deliver Christendom from false Jewish doctrines by restoring the Pauline conception of the gospel, Paul being, according to Marcion, the only apostle who had rightly understood the new message of salvation as delivered by Christ. In Marcion's own view, therefore, the founding of his church—to which he was first driven by opposition—amounts to a reformation of Christendom through a return to the gospel of Christ and to Paul; nothing was to be accepted beyond that. This of itself shows that it is a mistake to reckon Marcion among the Gnostics. A dualist he certainly was, but he was not a Gnostic.

Marcionism shows the influence of Hellenistic philosophy on Christianity and presents a moral critique of the Old Testament from the standpoint of Platonism. According to Harnack, the sect may have led other Christians to introduce a formal statement of beliefs into their liturgy (see Creed) and to formulate a canon of authoritative Scripture of their own, thus eventually producing the current canon of the New Testament.

As for the main question, however, whether he knew of, or assumes the existence of, a written New Testament of the Church in any sense whatever, in this case an affirmatory answer is most improbable, because if this were so he would have been compelled to make a direct attack upon the New Testament of the Church, and if such an attack had been made we should have heard of it from Tertullian. Marcion, on the contrary, treats the Catholic Church as one that 'follows the Testament of the Creator-God,' and directs the full force of his attack against this Testament and against the falsification of the Gospel and of the Pauline Epistles. His polemic would necessarily have been much less simple if he had been opposed to a Church which, by possessing a New Testament side by side with the Old Testament, had ipso facto placed the latter under the shelter of the former. In fact Marcion’s position towards the Catholic Church is intelligible, in the full force of its simplicity, only under the supposition that the Church had not yet in her hand any 'litera scripta Novi Testamenti.'

Marcion is believed to have imposed a severe morality on his followers, some of whom suffered in the persecution. In particular, he refused to re-admit those who recanted their faith under Roman persecution; see also lapsi. This severity extended to a thoroughgoing asceticism corresponding to Marcion's distance from the demiurge's creation. Marriage counted as porneia leading to phthora, destruction, and Marcion barred his community from marriage and sexual intercourse; only catechumens who vowed celibacy, or who renounced sexual relations if already married, were baptized and admitted to communion, so that the propagation of the created world would be curtailed. Meat and wine were likewise renounced, but fish was permitted and regarded as a kind of holy food, alongside bread, honey, milk and vegetables, so that the Marcionites can be classed as pescetarian. Epiphanius reports that bread and water were used at the Eucharist, and in keeping with Marcion's docetic Christology Tertullian records that hoc est corpus meum became figura corporis mei, the figure of my body.

== Marcionite canon ==
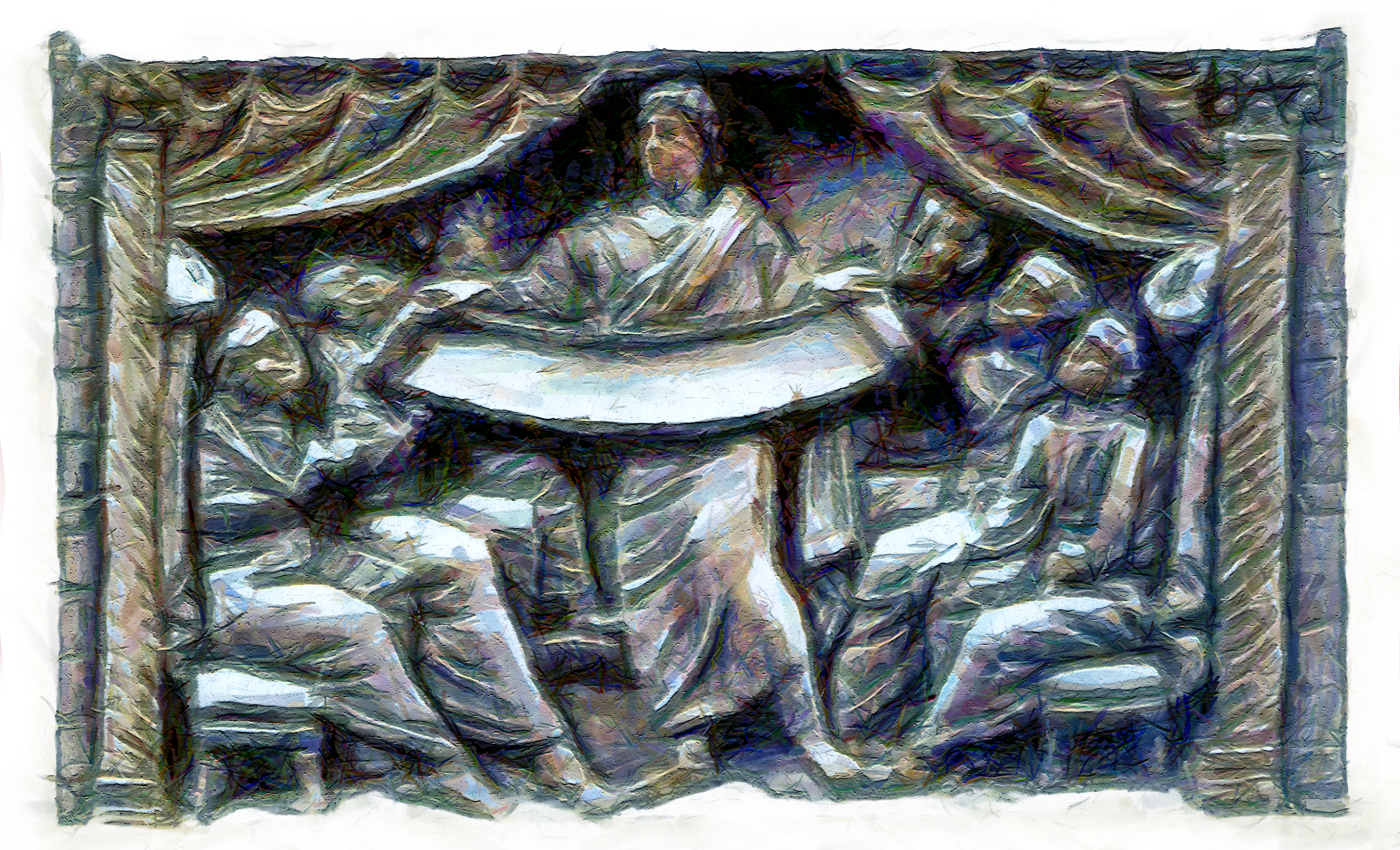
Marcion teaching. Mart Sander (mixed media, 2014)

Tertullian claimed Marcion was the first to separate the New Testament from the Old Testament. Marcion is said to have gathered scriptures from Jewish tradition, and juxtaposed these against the sayings and teachings of Jesus in a work entitled Antitheses. Besides the Antitheses, the Marcionite Testament comprised a Gospel of Christ — Marcion's version of Luke, which the Marcionites attributed to Paul — differing in a number of respects from the version now regarded as canonical. It appears to have lacked the prophecies of Christ's coming, the infancy narrative and the baptism, and its wording is generally terser than that of canonical Luke. It also included ten of the Pauline epistles, in the following order: Galatians, 1 Corinthians, 2 Corinthians, Romans, 1 Thessalonians, 2 Thessalonians, Laodiceans, Colossians, Philemon, Philippians.

Marcion's Apostolikon did not include the Pastoral epistles or the Epistle to the Hebrews. According to the Muratorian canon, it included a Marcionite pseudo-Paul's epistle to the Alexandrians and an epistle to the Laodiceans. The contents of this Marcionite Epistle to the Laodiceans are unknown. Some scholars equate it with the Epistle to the Ephesians, because the latter originally did not contain the words 'in Ephesus', and because it is the only non-pastoral Pauline epistle missing from the Marcionite canon, suggesting Laodiceans was simply Ephesians under another name. The Epistle to the Alexandrians is not known from any other source; Marcion himself appears to have never mentioned it.

In bringing together these texts, Marcion redacted what is perhaps the first New Testament canon on record, which he called the Gospel and the Apostolikon, which reflects his belief in the writings of Jesus and the apostle Paul respectively. An English- language reconstruction of the content of the Evangelion and Apostolikon attested in Patristic sources was published by Jason David BeDuhn in 2013.

The Prologues to the Pauline Epistles (which are not a part of the text, but short introductory sentences as one might find in modern study Bibles), found in several older Latin codices, are now widely believed to have been written by Marcion or one of his followers. Harnack makes the following claim:

We have indeed long known that Marcionite readings found their way into the ecclesiastical text of the Pauline Epistles, but now for seven years we have known that Churches actually accepted the Marcionite prefaces to the Pauline Epistles! De Bruyne has made one of the finest discoveries of later days in proving that those prefaces, which we read first in Codex Fuldensis and then in numbers of later manuscripts, are Marcionite, and that the Churches had not noticed the cloven hoof.

Conversely, several early Latin codices contain Anti-Marcionite Prologues to the Gospels.

=== Comparison ===
Marcionite canon (c. 130–140)		Modern canon (c. 4th century)	
Section	Books	Section	Books
Evangelikon	Gospel of Marcion (close resemblance to Gospel of Luke)	Gospels (Euangelia)	Gospel of Matthew; Gospel of Mark; Gospel of Luke; Gospel of John
(nonexistent)	(none)	Acts	Acts of the Apostles
Apostolikon	Galatians; 1 Corinthians; 2 Corinthians; Romans; 1 Thessalonians; 2 Thessalonians; Laodiceans^{1}; Colossians; Philippians; Philemon	Pauline epistles	Romans; 1 Corinthians; 2 Corinthians; Galatians; Ephesians; Philippians; Colossians; 1 Thessalonians; 2 Thessalonians; 1 Timothy; 2 Timothy; Titus; Philemon; Hebrews
(nonexistent)	(none)	Catholic epistles	James; 1 Peter; 2 Peter; 1 John; 2 John; 3 John; Jude
(nonexistent)	(none)	Apocalypses	Apocalypse of John
1. Contents unknown; some scholars equate it with Ephesians.

== Reaction to Marcion by early Christians ==
According to a remark by Origen (Commentary on the Gospel of Matthew 15.3), Marcion "prohibited allegorical interpretations of the scripture". Tertullian disputed this in his treatise against Marcion.

Tertullian, along with Epiphanius of Salamis, also charged that Marcion set aside the gospels of Matthew, Mark and John, and used Luke alone. Tertullian cited Luke 6:43–45 ("a good tree does not produce bad fruit") and Luke 5:36–38 ("nobody tears a piece from a new garment to patch an old garment or puts new wine in old wineskins"), in theorizing that Marcion set about to recover the authentic teachings of Jesus. Irenaeus claimed,

[Marcion's] salvation will be the attainment only of those souls which had learned his doctrine; while the body, as having been taken from the earth, is incapable of sharing in salvation.

Tertullian also attacked this view in De Carne Christi.

According to Irenaeus in Adversus Haereses, Polycarp once encountered Marcion:

And Polycarp himself replied to Marcion, who met him on one occasion, and said, "Dost thou know me?" "I do know thee, the first-born of Satan."

Hippolytus reported that Marcion's phantasmal (and Docetist) Christ was "revealed as a man, though not a man", and did not really die on the cross. However, Ernest Evans, in editing this work, observes:

This may not have been Marcion's own belief. It was certainly that of Hermogenes (cf. Tertullian, Adversus Hermogenem) and probably other gnostics and Marcionites, who held that the intractability of this matter explains the world's many imperfections.

== Islamic accounts ==
The Arabic name for Marcionism, marqiyūniyya, is attested to by several historical sources of the Islamic Golden Age which appear to reveal that a meager Marcionite community continued to exist in the Near East into the tenth century. For example, Thomas of Margā, abbot of the Eastern Syriac monastery of Beth ʿAvē, states that, at the end of the eighth century, the metropolitan bishop of Gēlān and Daylam, Šuḇḥālišoʿ, travelled into the remote parts of his see, preaching "among the pagans, Marcionites and Manichaeans." In a similar way, the tenth-century Muslim bibliographer Ibn al-Nadim goes so far as to claim that the Marcionites are "numerous in Khurāsān" and that there "they practice openly, like the Manichaeans." Although information about the Khorasanite Marcionites is not related in any other historical source, ibn al-Nadīm nevertheless also quotes a "reliable informant" (thiqa), "whom he says had seen Marcionite books and who reported that their script resembled that of the Manichaeans."

Those medieval Muslim writers who specialized in the study of foreign religions often presented Marcionite theology accurately. For example, al-Masʿūdī (d. 956) states that the Marcionites taught "two principles, good and evil, and justice is a third (principle) between the two," which, according to de Blois, are explicit references to the Marcionite belief in "the good god, evil matter, and the just god." In the majority of cases, the Islamic references to Marcionism are references to what has been termed "Neo-Marcionism," a sub-branch of the sect that seems to have lived in Khorasan in the tenth century. The classical Muslim thinkers rejected all types of Marcionite theology as deviations from the truth, and some thinkers, such as ibn al-Malāḥimī (d. c. 1050) wrote polemics against them as others did against Nicene Christianity. This did not, however, prevent many of the same thinkers from studying the Marcionites from an anthropological or sociological point of view, as is evident from Ibn al-Malāḥimī's extended reference to the customs of the Marcionites.

== Further scholarship ==
In Lost Christianities, Bart Ehrman contrasts the Marcionites with the Ebionites as polar ends of a spectrum with regard to the Old Testament. Ehrman describes Marcionism as rejecting the Jewish God, the Hebrew Bible, and the material world, as well as elevating Paul as the primary apostle. There were early Christian groups, such as the Ebionites, which did not accept Paul's writings as a part of their canon. Ehrman asserts that Marcion likely "hated Jews and everything Jewish". This claim, however, is unsupported by other contemporary historians.

Robert M. Price considers the Pauline canon a single collection of epistles despite the problem which is caused by a lack of knowledge as to how they were collected, when they were collected, who collected them and sent copies of them to the various churches. Price has investigated several historical scenarios and reached the conclusion that Marcion was the first person in recorded history who is known to have collected Paul's writings and sent copies of them to various churches together as a canon. He summarizes,

But the first collector of the Pauline Epistles had been Marcion. No one else we know of would be a good candidate, certainly not the essentially fictive Luke, Timothy, and Onesimus. And Marcion, as Burkitt and Bauer show, fills the bill perfectly.

David Trobisch argues that the evidence which is revealed by comparison of the oldest manuscripts of Paul’s letters proves that several epistles had previously been assembled as an anthology which was published separate from the New Testament, and as a whole, this anthology was then incorporated into the New Testament. Trobisch also argues that Paul was the assembler of his own letters for publication.

=== Reconstruction of Marcion's gospel and the synoptic problem ===
Since 2010 the relation of Marcion's gospel to the Gospel of Luke has been reopened. Jason BeDuhn has argued that the omissions alleged by the church fathers cannot be explained as theological redaction, since for each supposedly excised motif a passage of equivalent content can be identified that was not previously present; on this view Marcion's text is better understood as an independent variant of Luke descending from a common precursor rather than as an abridgement.

Two full reconstructions of the text appeared in 2015, by Dieter T. Roth and by Matthias Klinghardt, proceeding from different methodological premises. Klinghardt argues for a "Marcion priority": the text Marcion transmitted represents a pre-canonical state on which all four canonical gospels depend, so that Luke is an expanded revision of it rather than its source. If accepted, this would displace Marcan priority and render the hypothesis of a sayings source unnecessary, and it implies a dating of the canonical gospels into the 2nd century in line with David Trobisch's thesis of a single early final redaction of the New Testament.

The thesis is contested. Eduard Lohse held it more probable that canon formation had begun before Marcion, since Justin Martyr, a contemporary who engaged critically with Marcion's teaching, already knew a fourfold gospel. Judith Lieu situates Marcion within the intra-Christian debates of the 2nd century and treats the canonical Luke as the outcome of an editorial development that first becomes visible in the edition associated with Marcion.

== Influence ==
The Bogomil and Cathar movements held similar dualistic views, and rejected the Old Testament God for reasons Marcion had originally enunciated. However, it remains unclear whether these are continuations of earlier Marcionite and Gnostic traditions, or represents an independent re-invention.

Nikolai Berdyaev saw the antitheism of his day as a muddled form of the ancient Marcionite rejection of a creator god because of the problem of evil.

During the Nazi era, aspects of Marcion's ideas were similar to a group of Nazi Protestants who advocated the complete rejection of the Old Testament.

== See also ==
- Antinomianism
- Antitactae
- Borborites
- Catharism
- Christianity in the ante-Nicene period
- Gnosticism
- List of Gnostic sects
- Manichaeism
- Marcion hypothesis
- Positive Christianity
- Yaldabaoth
