= David Trobisch =

German scholar (born 1958)

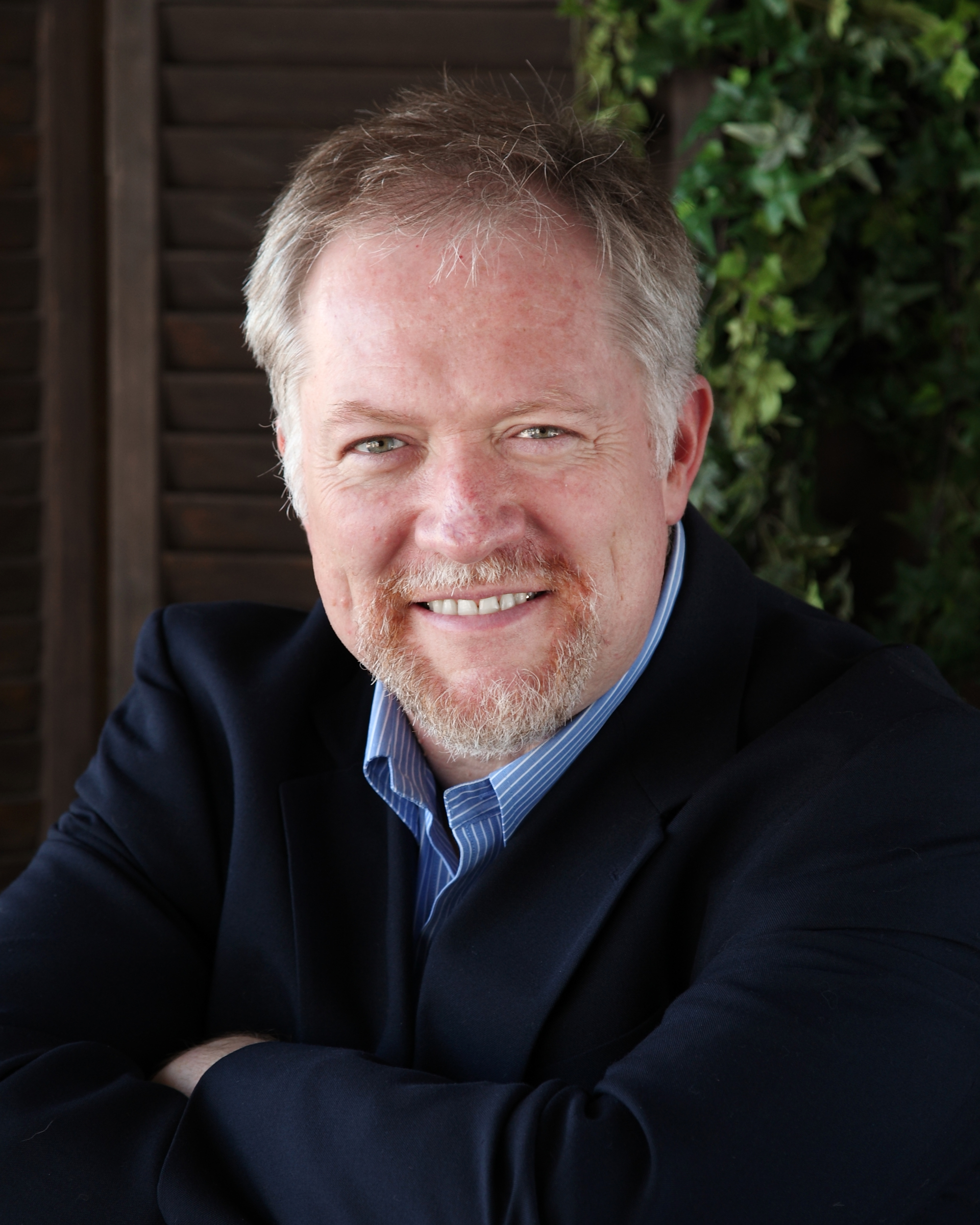
- Born: Ebolowa, Cameroon
- Occupation: Biblical scholar

Academic background
- Education: Doctor of Theology
- Alma mater: Heidelberg University
- Doctoral advisor: Prof. Gerd Theißen

Academic work
- Institutions: Heidelberg University; Yale Divinity School; Bangor Theological Seminary
- Main interests: Theology, Bible
- Notable works: The First Edition of the New Testament
- Website: http://trobisch.com/david/wb/

David Johannes Trobisch (born on August 18, 1958) is a German scholar whose work has focused on formation of the Christian Bible, ancient New Testament manuscripts and the epistles of Paul.

== Life ==
Trobisch grew up in Cameroon, where his parents served as Lutheran missionaries.

Trobisch divides his time between Germany, where his wife, son and two grandchildren live, and a home in Springfield, Missouri. When in the U.S., he considers himself part of the Evangelical Lutheran Church in America.

=== Education ===
Trobisch went to school in Austria and after passing the Abitur, (University entrance exam) in 1976 (Matura BEA Saalfelden), he moved to Germany and studied Koine Greek at Augustana Divinity School (Neuendettelsau). Trobisch also studied in Tübingen, and in 1977 he studied biblical Hebrew at the Heidelberg University.

In 1982 Trobisch earned his Master of Theology from Heidelberg University. From 1988 he holds his Doctor of Theology also from the Heidelberg University, under his advisor: Prof. Gerd Theissen with his thesis: Die Entstehung der Paulusbriefsammlung : Studien zu den Anfängen christlicher Publizistik. From 1995, Trobisch holds his Habilitation with the thesis Die Endredaktion des Neuen Testaments: eine Untersuchung zur Entstehung der christlichen Bibel also from Heidelberg University.

=== Teaching ===
Trobisch has taught at Heidelberg University, Missouri State University, and Yale Divinity School.

From September 1996 to July 2008, he worked at Bangor Theological Seminary, where he became Throckmorton-Hayes Professor of New Testament Language and Literature (2000-2009).

=== Academic work ===
Trobisch served as the founding Director of Museum of the Bible. Since February 2014 to January 2015, he was Director of the Green Collection, Oklahoma City, Oklahoma, and from February 2015 to March 2018 he served as Director of Collections.

David Trobisch is also recognized for his work on the Letters of Paul, the Formation of the Christian Bible, Performance Theory in Antiquity, and Bible Manuscripts. He is on the editorial board of the Novum Testamentum Graece.

== Ideas ==
Since the publication of his book The First Edition of the New Testament in 2000, Trobisch has argued against the commonly held notion that the New Testament canon developed gradually over centuries. Instead, Trobisch argues that a collection of Christian scriptures closely approximating the modern New Testament canon "was edited and published by specific people at a very specific time and at a very specific place."

His argument centers around the striking uniformity found in ancient manuscripts of New Testament documents. According to Trobisch, almost all extant manuscripts document a closed collection of 27 books, listed in the same order and grouped in the same four volumes, bearing the same titles with very few variants, and all using the same unique system to mark sacred terms (nomina sacra). He also points out that nearly all manuscripts were published in the form of a codex, rather than the scroll format which was overwhelmingly dominant in non-Christian literature at the time. From these facts, Trobisch concludes that almost all our extant manuscripts of New Testament documents must be copies of a single, very influential published collection.

Trobisch argues that this "first edition of the New Testament" was published some time in the mid- to late second century. Because late second century and early third century Christian authors such as Irenaeus, Clement of Alexandria, and Tertullian seem to have used a canon of scripture very similar to the modern one, Trobisch holds that the New Testament must have been published before 180 CE.

In a 2007 article titled Who Published the New Testament?, Trobisch postulated that the publisher of the first edition of the New Testament may well have been Polycarp, an early bishop of Smyrna in Asia Minor. Trobisch based this conclusion on a variety of factors. Firstly, Polycarp was a well-known person in the mid-second century, who held authority among proto-Catholic Christians in both Rome and Asia Minor. Secondly, Polycarp was reputed to be a disciple of John the Apostle, so his authority would have been able to add credibility to the Gospel of John and the Johannine epistles of the New Testament, which are widely believed by modern scholars not to be authentic works of John the Apostle. Thirdly, Polycarp was known to be a vocal opponent of Marcionite Christianity, which Trobisch and many other scholars take to be a major impetus for the development of the New Testament canon. Finally, Polycarp is believed to have had experience in publishing, because he distributed the first collection of the epistles of Ignatius (see Pol. Phil. 13).

=== Views on Marcion ===
Some time in the second century, the heretical Christian thinker Marcion of Sinope published his own Christian canon which contained a shorter version of the Gospel of Luke (the Gospel of Marcion) and ten Pauline epistles. Trobisch holds the view, shared by scholars such as John Knox and Joseph Tyson, that the gospel used by Marcion is earlier than the canonical Luke-Acts, and that Luke-Acts was in fact published as a response to Marcion's canon, contemporaneously with the publishing of the first edition of the New Testament as a whole.

== Reception ==
Michael Kok has questioned Trobisch's theory that the New Testament was canonized by a single group of editors given the differences in copies between the gospels, variant orderings in the canonical lists, and the presence of nomina sacra.

Stanley Stowers found Die Entstehung de Paulusbriefsammlung to provide a knowledgeable and creative account of Paul's epistolary collection, though he found certain conclusions unconvincing. He finds Trobisch's strength in describing the development of letter collections but a major handicap describing the stage from private communication to collection.

Eugene Lovering, Jr. welcomed Trobisch's contribution to studying the Pauline epistolary collection and his accurate survey of past scholarship, but notes that he only partly addresses the evidence of the corpus, forcibly dismissing sequences that significantly differ from the canonicals. According to Lovering, Trobisch's study of contemporary letters tends to be sketchy and too uncritically applied to Paul's, but he does not discount the potential of his methodology and proposals.

Barbara Bowe finds Trobisch's proposals "ingenious, if not altogether convincing or defensible", uncovering a lack of familiarity with recent rhetorical studies on Paul's epistles and acknowledgements of alternate scholarly perspectives. Bowe contends that the work purports to represent consensus, though should actually be seen as fascinating and novel conjecture.

Larry Hurtado called Die Endredaktion des Nuen Testaments a "noteworthy and well-argued thesis." Hurtado rejects Trobisch's 'uncritical' support for George Howard and Schuyler Brown's theories as well his argument regarding Christian preference for the codex, while noting the latter's strengths regarding historical background, affirmations of diversity, and proposal that the New Testament was intended to be read as a collection.

D. C. Parker finds much to commend in Trobisch's The First Edition of the New Testament, notably in regard to the nomina sacra, the adoption of the codex, and ordering of certain NT books. However, he also finds counter-evidence such as the anachronistic concept of an edition, the inconsistency of the nominal sacra in early witnesses, the contents and ordering of the books, of which he finds Trobisch's discussion the most dubious, the titles of the writings, and the variety of text-types.

== Works ==
=== Theses ===
- Trobisch, David (1989). Die Entstehung der Paulusbriefsammlung: Studien zu den Anfängen christlicher Publizistik (ThD thesis Heidelberg, Wintersemester 1987/88). Novum Testamentum et orbis antiquus (in German). Vol. 10. Freiburg, Schweiz: Universitätsverlag; Göttingen: Vandenhoeck & Ruprecht. ISBN 978-3525539118. OCLC 20542167.
- Trobisch, David (1996). Die Endredaktion des Neuen Testaments: eine Untersuchung zur Entstehung der christlichen Bibel (Habilitationsschrift--Heidelberg, 1994). Novum Testamentum et orbis antiquus. Vol. 31. Fribourg: Universitätsverlag; Göttingen: Vandenhoeck & Ruprecht. ISBN 3-7278-1075-0. OCLC 467576020.

=== Books ===
- Trobisch, David (1994). Paul's letter collection : tracing the origins. Minneapolis: Fortress Press. ISBN 978-0800625979. OCLC 30036741.
- Trobisch, David (2000). The First Edition of the New Testament. New York: Oxford University Press. doi:10.1093/acprof:oso/9780195112405.001.0001. ISBN 978-0-195-11240-5. OCLC 827708997.
- Trobisch, David (2012). "The New Testament in Light of Book Publishing in Antiquity". In Kloppenberg, John S.; Newman, Judith H. (eds.). Editing the Bible: Assessing the Task Past and Present (PDF). Resources for Biblical Study. Vol. 69. Atlanta, GA: Society of Biblical Literature. pp. 161–170. ISBN 978-1-58983-648-8.
- Ward, Richard F; Trobisch, David (2013). Bringing the Word to life : engaging the New Testament through performing it. Grand Rapids, Michigan: William B. Eerdmans Publishing Company. ISBN 978-1467437646. OCLC 871069009.
- Trobisch, David (2018). "The Gospel According to John in the Light of Marcion's Gospelbook". In Heilmann, Jan; Klinghardt, Matthias (eds.). Das Neue Testament und sein Text im 2.Jahrhundert. Texte und Arbeiten zum neutestamentlichen Zeitalter. Vol. 61. Tübingen, Germany: Narr Francke Attempto Verlag GmbH. pp. 171–172. ISBN 978-3-7720-8640-3.

=== Articles ===
- Trobisch, David (2007). "Who Published the New Testament?" (PDF). Free Inquiry. 28 (Dec. 2007/Jan. 2008). Amherst, NY: Council for Secular Humanism: 30–33.
