= Papyrus 69 =

- New Testament manuscript
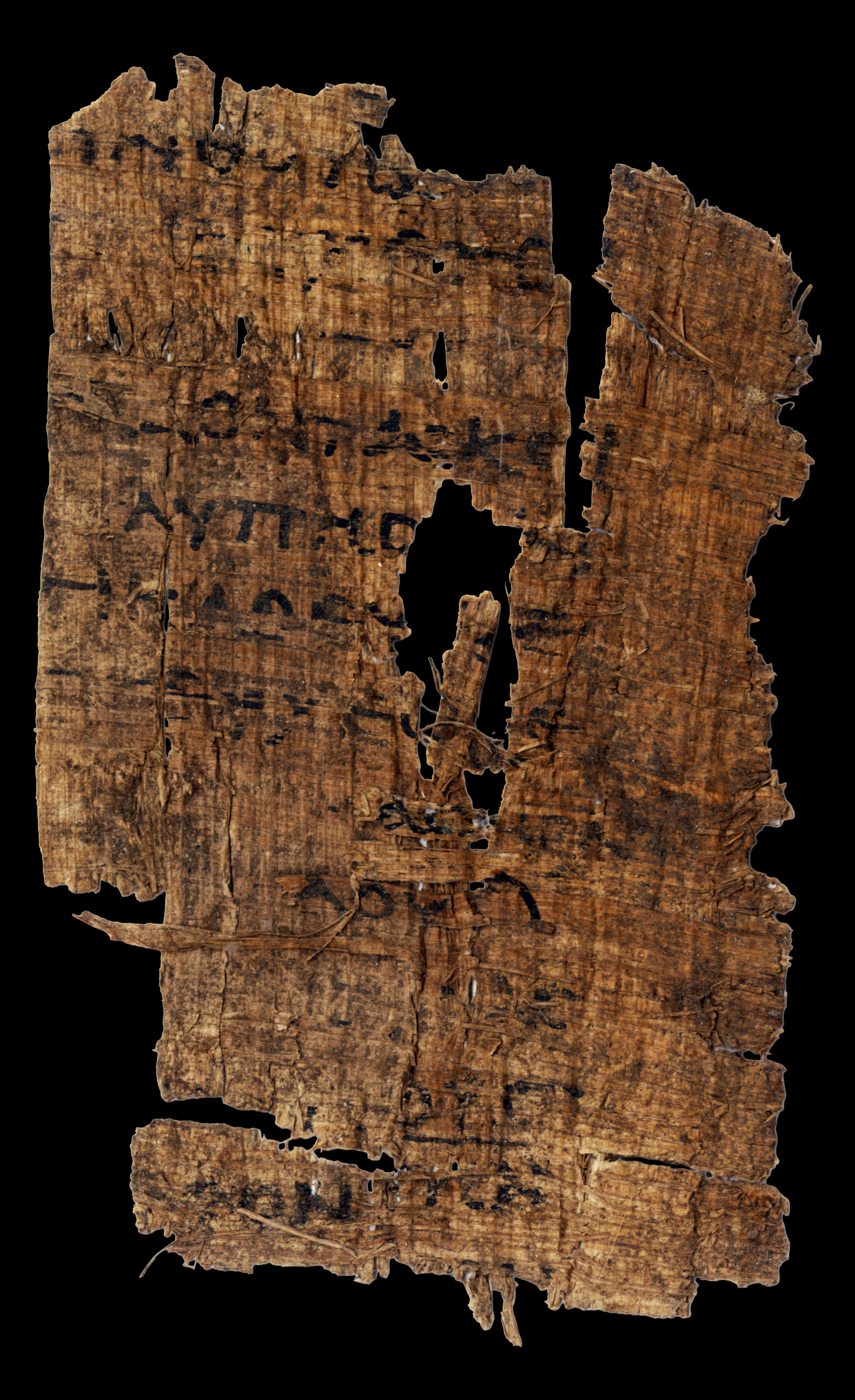
- Recto, Luke 22:41-48
- Name: P. Oxy 2383
- Sign: 𝔓^{69}
- Text: Luke 22:41,45-48r+22:58-61v
- Date: c. 200-300
- Script: Greek
- Found: Oxyrhynchus, Egypt
- Now at: Papyrology Rooms, Bodleian Art, Archaeology and Ancient World Library, Oxford
- Size: 8.5 x 5 cm
- Type: Western text-type
- Category: IV

Papyrus 69 (designated by 𝔓^{69} in the Gregory-Aland numbering) is a small fragment dating to the 3rd century. Scholars have debated whether its text is a witness to the Gospel of Marcion or the canonical Gospel of Luke.

== Description ==
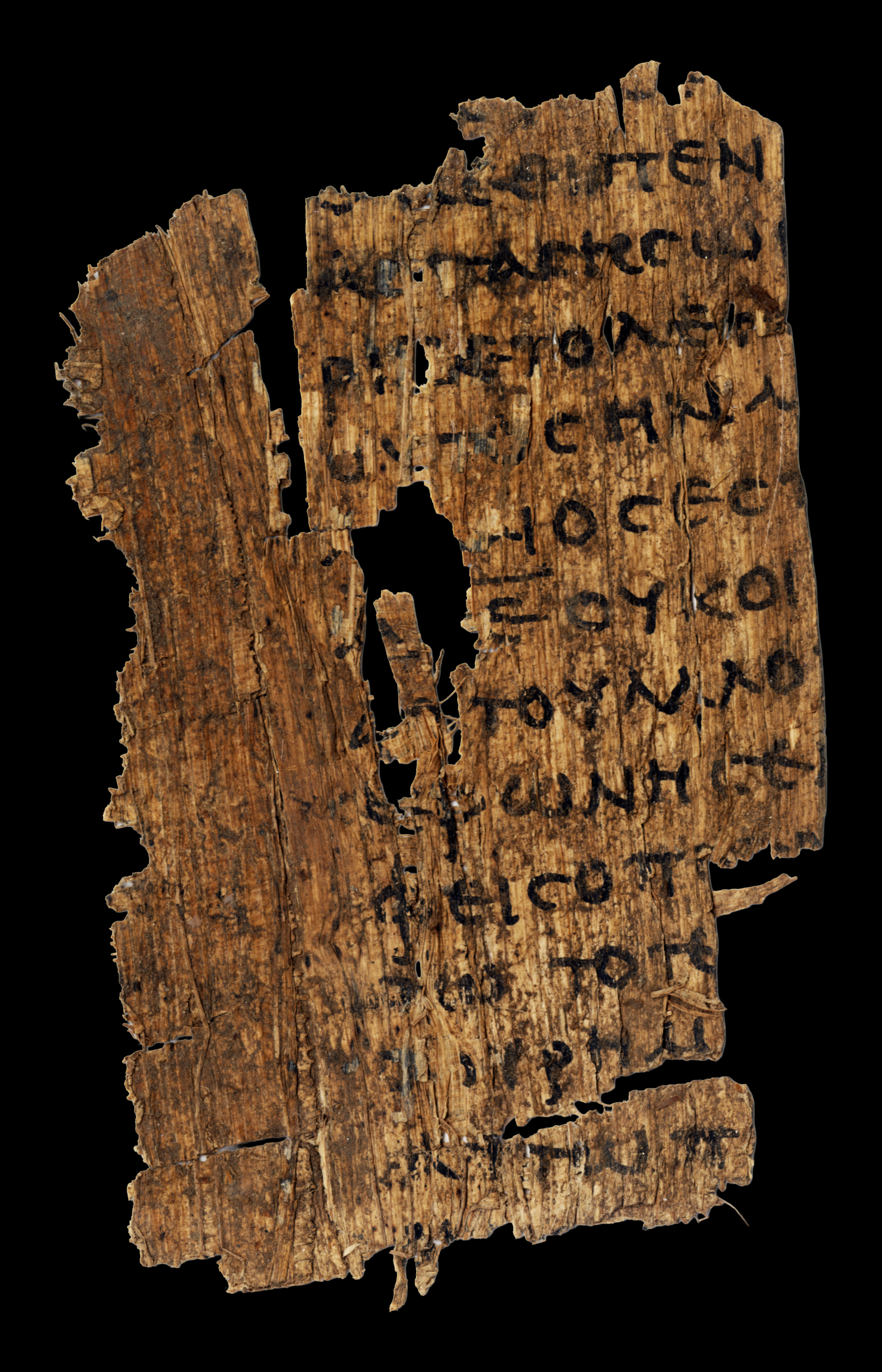
Verso, Luke 22:58-61

This fragment (𝔓^{69} or P. Oxy 2383) recounts the prayer of Jesus in Gethsemane, the betrayal of Jesus by Judas, and the betrayal of Jesus by Peter. Famously, and similar to the Gospel of Marcion, it omits all of Luke 22:42–45a, a portion famous for Jesus asking, 'remove this cup from me' (22:42), for an 'angel from heaven' appearing' (22:43), and for Jesus sweating drops of blood (22:44).

Claire Clivaz has developed the hypothesis that 𝔓^{69} is most plausibly understood 'as a witness to a Marcionite edition of Luke's Gospel', an idea she credits to François Bovon. Jason BeDuhn has supported this hypothesis, drawing upon 𝔓^{69} in his reconstruction of the Gospel of Marcion. Peter M. Head, conversely, has dismissed Clivaz' arguments in two posts on an Evangelical Christian blog.

The Greek text of this codex is a representative of the Western text-type. According to Aland text is very free, "characteristic of precursors of the D-text", therefore Aland placed it in Category IV.

== Text ==
[recto]

[εις πειρασ]μ[ον] ^{[41]} κ̣[αι αυτος απεσ]
[πασθη απ αυτων ωσ]ε̣ι λιθου β̣ο̣λ̣[ην]
[και θεις τα γονατα προσ]η̣υ̣χ̣ε̣τ̣ο̣
^{[45]} [ελθων προς τους μ̣αθ]ητ[ας ευ]
[ρεν αυτους καθευ]δοντας κοι
[μωμενους αυτους απο τη]ς̣ λυπης ^{[46]} [κ]α̣ι̣
[ειπεν αυτοις] τ̣ι κ̣α̣θευδ̣ε
[τε ανασταντες πρ]ο̣σ̣ευχεσ̣θ̣ε
[ινα μη εισελθητε εις πει]ρ̣ασμ̣ο̣ν̣
^{[47]} [ετι δε αυτου λαλουντος ι]δου̣
[οχλος και ο λεγομενος ιου]δ̣ας
[εις των ι̅β̅ προηρχετο α]υ̣[τ]ους
[και εγγισας εφιλησε]ν̣ τ̣ον ι̣̅η̅ν̅
^{[48]} [ι̅η̅ς̅ δε ειπεν αυτω ιουδα φι]λ̣η̣[ματι

[verso]

^{[58]} – [ιδων] α̣υ̣[τ]ω̣ ε̣[φη και συ εξ αυτων ει]
ο̣ δ̣ε ειπεν [α̅ν̅ε̅ ουκ ειμι ^{[59]} και δι]
α̣σ̣τασης ωσ̣[ει ωρας α̅ αλλος τις ισχυ]
ριζ̣ετο λεγω[ν επ αληθειας και]
ου̣τ̣ο̣ς ην μ[ετ αυτου και γαρ γα]
λ̣[ι]λ̣α̣ιος εστ̣[ιν] ^{[60]} [ειπεν δε ο πετρος]
α̣ν̣̅ε ουκ οι[δα ο λεγεις και ετι]
αυτου λαλου̣[ντος παραχρημα]
ε̣φωνησεν̣ [αλεκτωρ] ^{[61]} [και στρα]
φεις ο πε̣τ̣ρ̣[ος ενεβλεψεν αυ]
τω τοτε [υπεμνησθη ο πετρος]
τ̣ου ρημ[ατος του κ̅υ̅ ως ειπεν]
αυ̣τω π[ριν αλεκτορα φωνησαι ση]
μ̣[ερον απαρνηση με τρις] ^{[62]} [και]

== See also ==
- List of New Testament papyri
- Luke 22
- Christ's agony at Gethsemane

== Images ==
- P69/P.Oxy.L 2383
- Images of P69 at the Center for the Study of New Testament Manuscripts
