= Marcion of Sinope =

Early Christian theologian (c.85–c.160)

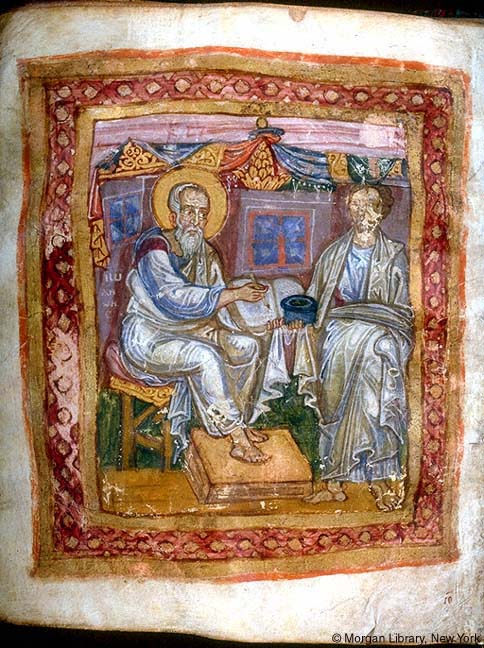
- Apostle John (left) and (according to Eisler) Marcion of Sinope (right), from Morgan Library MS 748, 11th century
- Born: AD 85; Sinope, Bithynia and Pontus, Roman Empire
- Died: AD 160 (aged 75); Roman Anatolia, Roman Empire
- Notable work: Gospel of Marcion
- Theological work
- Era: Patristic age
- Tradition or movement: Marcionism
- Main interests: Dualism, Nontrinitarianism

Marcion of Sinope (Ancient Greek: Μαρκίων (Note: Genitive: Μαρκίωνος) Σινώπης; c. 85 – c. 160) was a theologian in early Christianity. Marcion preached that God had sent Jesus Christ, who was distinct from the "vengeful" God (Demiurge) who had created the world. He considered himself a follower of Paul the Apostle, whom he believed to have been the only true apostle of Jesus Christ; his doctrine is called Marcionism. Marcion published the earliest record of a canon of New Testament books.

Early Church writers such as Justin Martyr, Irenaeus, and Tertullian denounced Marcion as a heretic or antichrist, and he was excommunicated by the church of Rome around 144. He published his own canon of Christian sacred scriptures, which contained ten Pauline epistles (including the Epistle to the Laodiceans, while excluding the Pastoral epistles) and the Gospel of Marcion, which the majority of scholars agree was a later revised version of the Gospel of Luke.

This made Marcionism a catalyst in the process of the development of the New Testament canon by forcing the proto-orthodox Church to respond to his canon.

== Life ==
Epiphanius records in his Panarion (c. 375) that Marcion was born the son of a bishop in Pontus (modern-day Turkey), likely Philologus of Sinope. Rhodo and Tertullian, young men in Marcion's old age, described him as a "mariner" and a "ship-master" respectively. Some time between 135 and 140, Marcion traveled to Rome, joined the Roman church, and made a large donation of 200,000 sesterces to the congregation there. Conflicts with the church of Rome arose and he was eventually excommunicated in 144, his donation being returned to him.

Irenaeus writes that "a certain Cerdo, originating from the Simonians, came to Rome under Hyginus [...] and taught that the one who was proclaimed as God by the Law and the Prophets is not the Father of our Lord Jesus Christ" (Against Heresies, 1, 27, 1). Also, according to them, Marcion and the Gnostic Valentinus were companions in Rome.

In 394, Epiphanius claimed that after beginnings as an ascetic, Marcion seduced a virgin and was accordingly excommunicated by his father, prompting him to leave his home town. Some scholars have taken this "seduction of a virgin" as a metaphor for Marcion's corruption of the Christian Church, with the Church portrayed as the undefiled virgin, and that Marcion apparently has become "the victim of the historicisation of such a metaphor, even though it contradicts the otherwise firm tradition of his strict sexual probity". Tertullian claims in The Prescription Against Heretics (written c. 200) that Marcion professed repentance, and agreed to the conditions granted to him—that he should receive reconciliation if he restored to the Church those whom he had led astray—but that he was prevented from doing so by his death; modern scholars consider this unlikely to be true.

== Marcionite Church ==
The Marcionite church expanded greatly within Marcion's lifetime, becoming a major rival to the other emerging church. After his death, it retained its following and survived Christian controversy and imperial disapproval for several centuries. Adolf von Harnack viewed him as a 2nd-century "Martin Luther".

Harnack stresses how unlike the emerging catholic church the Marcionite congregations were in their internal order. Tertullian complained that office among them was unsettled and widely shared: “one man is bishop today, another tomorrow; a deacon today is a reader tomorrow; a presbyter today is a layman tomorrow.” The same polemic remarked on an absence of charismatic phenomena in their assemblies, since the Marcionites had no prophets or visionaries among them.

== Teachings ==
Study of the Hebrew Bible, along with received writings circulating in the nascent Church, led Marcion to conclude that many of the teachings of Jesus were incompatible with the actions of Yahweh, characterized as the belligerent god of the Hebrew Bible. Marcion responded by developing a ditheistic system of belief around the year 144. (Note: 115 years and six months from the start of Christ's ministry in the fifteenth year of Tiberius, according to Tertullian's reckoning in Adversus Marcionem, xv.) This notion of two gods—a higher transcendent one and a lower world-creator and ruler—allowed Marcion to reconcile his perceived contradictions between Christian Covenant theology and the gospel proclaimed by the New Testament.

In contrast to other leaders of the nascent Christian Church, however, Marcion declared that Christianity was in complete discontinuity with Judaism and entirely opposed to the scriptures of Judaism. Marcion did not claim that these were false. Instead, he asserted that they were entirely true, but were to be read in an absolutely literalistic manner, one which led him to develop an understanding that Yahweh was not the same God spoken of by Jesus. For example, Marcion argued that the Genesis account of Yahweh walking through the Garden of Eden asking where Adam was, proved that Yahweh inhabited a physical body and was without universal knowledge, attributes wholly incompatible with the Heavenly Father professed by Jesus.

According to Marcion, the God of the Old Testament, whom he called the Demiurge, the creator of the material universe, is a jealous tribal deity of the Jews, whose law represents legalistic reciprocal justice and who punishes mankind for its sins through suffering and death. In contrast, the God that Jesus professed is an altogether different being, a universal God of compassion and love who looks upon humanity with benevolence and mercy. Marcion also produced a book titled Antitheses, which is no longer extant, contrasting the Demiurge of the Old Testament with the Heavenly Father of the New Testament.

Marcion held Jesus to be the son of the Heavenly Father but understood the incarnation in a docetic manner, i.e. that Jesus' body was only an imitation of a material body, and consequently denied Jesus' physical and bodily birth, death, and resurrection.

Marcion was the first to codify a Christian canon. His canon consisted of only eleven books, grouped into two sections: the Evangelikon, a shorter version of the Gospel of Luke, and the Apostolikon, a selection of ten epistles of Paul the Apostle, which were also slightly shorter than the canonical text. Early Christians such as Irenaeus, Tertullian, and Epiphanius claimed that Marcion's editions of Luke and the Pauline epistles were intentionally edited by Marcion to match his theological views, and most modern scholars agree. However, some scholars such as Matthias Klinghardt argue that Marcion's texts were not substantially edited by him, and may in some respects represent an earlier version of these texts than the canonical versions or even the oldest. Like the Gospel of Mark, the gospel used by Marcion did not contain elements relating to Jesus's birth and childhood. Interestingly, it did contain some Jewish elements, and material that challenged Marcion's ditheism—a fact that was utilized by early Christians in their articulations against Marcion.

The centrality of the Pauline epistles in Marcion's canon reflects the fact that Marcion considered Paul to be the correct interpreter and transmitter of Jesus' teachings, in contrast to the Twelve Disciples and the early Jerusalem church. In Marcion's view, the other apostles were under the auspices of the Demiurge.

== Gnosticism ==
Marcion is sometimes described as a Gnostic philosopher. In some essential respects, Marcion proposed ideas which aligned well with Gnostic thought. Like the Gnostics, he believed that this world was not the creation of the one true God.

However, Marcionism conceptualizes God in a way which cannot be reconciled with broader Gnostic thought. For Gnostics, some human beings are born with a small piece of God's soul lodged within their spirit (akin to the notion of a divine spark). God is thus intimately connected to and part of his creation. Salvation lies in turning away from the physical world (which Gnostics regard as an illusion) and embracing the godlike qualities within oneself. Marcion, by contrast, held that the Heavenly Father (the father of Jesus Christ) was an utterly alien God; he had no part in making the world, nor any connection with it. According to Bart Ehrman: "Marcion himself should not be thought of as a Gnostic; he held that there were only two gods, not many; he did not think of this world as a cosmic disaster, but as the creation of the Old Testament God; and he did not think divine sparks resided in human bodies that could be set free by understanding the true 'gnosis.' Moreover, his docetic view does not appear to have been the typical view of Gnostics."

== See also ==
- Antinomianism
- Manichaeism

== Works cited ==
- BeDuhn, Jason (2015). "The New Marcion" (PDF). Forum. 3 (Fall 2015): 163–179. Archived from the original (PDF) on 2019-05-25.
- Blackman, E.C. Marcion and His Influence [1948] 2004. ISBN 978-1-59244-731-2.
- Bruce, F. F. (1988). The Canon of Scripture. InterVarsity Press. ISBN 978-0-8308-1258-5.
- Clabeaux, John James. The Lost Edition of the Letters of Paul: A Reassessment of the Text of Pauline Corpus Attested by Marcion (Catholic Biblical Quarterly Monograph Series No. 21) 1989 ISBN 0-915170-20-5.
- Dahl, Nils Alstrup. "The Origin of the Earliest Prologues to the Pauline Letters", Semeia 12 (1978), pp. 233–277.
- Epiphanius of Salamis. The Panarion of Epiphanius of Salamis, Book 1 (Sects 1-46) Frank Williams translator, 1987. ISBN 90-04-07926-2.
- Evans, Ernest (comments and translation): Tertullian, Against Marcion (Oxford University Press, 1972). E-text of Adversus Marcionem and Evan's introduction "Marcion : His Doctrine and Influence"
- Grant, Robert M. Marcion and the Critical Method Peter Richardson & John Collidge Hurd, eds., From Jesus to Paul. Studies in Honour of Francis Wright Beare. Waterloo, ON, 1984. pp. 207–215.
- Harnack, Adolf (1900). History of Dogma. Translated by Buchanan, Neil.
- Harnack, Adolf (1921). Marcion: The Gospel of the Alien God. Translated by Steely, John E.; Bierma, Lyle D. Grand Rapids: Baker. ISBN 978-1-55635-703-9.
- Hoffmann, R. Joseph (1984). Marcion, on the Restitution of Christianity: An Essay on the Development of Radical Paulist Theology in the Second Century. Chico, Calif: Scholars Press. ISBN 0-89130-638-2.
- Knox, John (1942). Marcion and the New Testament: An Essay in the Early History of the Canon. Chicago: Chicago University Press. ISBN 978-0404161835..
- Klinghardt, Matthias (2008). "The Marcionite Gospel and the Synoptic Problem: A New Suggestion". Novum Testamentum. 50 (1): 1–27. doi:10.1163/156853608X257527. JSTOR 25442581.
- Livingstone, E. A. The Oxford Dictionary of the Christian Church (3rd ed.), pp. 1033–34, 1997 ISBN 0-19-211655-X.
- Francis Legge, Forerunners and Rivals of Christianity, From 330 B.C. to 330 A.D. (1914), reprinted in two volumes bound as one, University Books New York, 1964. LCCN 64-24125.
- Mitchell, Charles W., ed. (1912). S. Ephraim's Prose Refutations of Mani, Marcion, and Bardaisan. Vol. 1. London: Text and Translation Society.
- Mitchell, Charles W.; Bevan, Anthony A.; Burkitt, Francis C., eds. (1921). S. Ephraim's Prose Refutations of Mani, Marcion, and Bardaisan. Vol. 2. London: Text and Translation Society.
- Mitchell, Margaret; Young, Frances, eds. (2006). The Cambridge History of Christianity: Origins to Constantine. Vol. 1. Cambridge University Press. ISBN 9780521812399.
- Moll, Sebastian, The Arch-Heretic Marcion, Wissenschaftliche Untersuchungen zum Neuen Testament 250, Mohr Siebeck, Tübingen 2010 (Spanish translation: Marción. El primer hereje, Biblioteca de Estudios Bíblicos 145, Ediciones Sígueme, Salamanca 2014)
- Riparelli, Enrico, Il volto del Cristo dualista. Da Marcione ai catari, Peter Lang, Bern 2008, 368 pp. ISBN 978-3-03911-490-0.
- Sproul, R.C., How Then Shall We Worship?. Colorado Springs, CO: David C Cook, 2013. ISBN 978-1-4347-0424-5 p. 16.
- Williams, David Salter. "Reconsidering Marcion's Gospel", Journal of Biblical Literature 108 (1989), pp. 477–96
- Wilson, R. S. Marcion: A Study of a Second-Century Heretic (London: Clarke) 1933.
