= Antitactae =

Antitactæ, or antitactici, in antiquity, were a Gnostic sect who believed that God was good and just, but that one of his creatures had created evil, and had engaged humans to follow it, in order to set us in opposition to God. They believed that it was the duty of humanity to oppose this author of evil, in order to avenge God of his enemy. Their name is from the ancient Greek for "I oppose; I am contrary".

They are described as licentious and antinomian gnostics, rather than as a specific sect, by Philip Schaff's History of the Christian Church. Also by Schaff, they were linked with Prodicians, followers of Prodicus.

Clement of Alexandria argued that they sought to commit adultery to abolish God's commandment against adultery.

The Diccionario Enciclopédico de Biblia y Teología describes them as the antinomian branch of the gnostics, viewing the rule of God as not obligatory for them, and intentional violators of it. It puts the Carpocratians and Basilidians, among others, in this group.

== See also ==
- Marcionism
