= Jason BeDuhn =

American theologian (born 1963)

Jason David BeDuhn
- Born: January 22, 1963 (age 63); Moline, Illinois
- Citizenship: United States
- Occupations: University teacher, historian, biblical scholar
- Known for: Research to Manichaeism, Bible translation and Early christianity
- Title: Professor
- Awards: Guggenheim Fellowship (2004), Best First Book Award in the History of Religions (2001)

Academic background
- Education: University of Illinois at Urbana-Champaign (BA, 1985); Harvard Divinity School (MTS, 1988); Indiana University Bloomington (PhD, 1995)
- Alma mater: Indiana University Bloomington
- Thesis: The metabolism of salvation: the Manichaean body in ascesis and ritual (1995)

Academic work
- Discipline: History of religion, History of culture
- Institutions: Northern Arizona University (since 1998), University of Indianapolis (1997–1998), Western Maryland College (1996), Indiana University Bloomington (1990–1995, 1996–1997, 1998)
- Website: https://nau.academia.edu/JasonBeDuhn

Jason David BeDuhn (born on 22 January 1963 in Moline, Illinois) is an American historian of religion and culture, currently Professor of the Comparative Study of Religions, Classics, and Asian Studies at Northern Arizona University, and former chair of the Department of Humanities, Arts, and Religion.

== Life ==
Jason David BeDuhn was born on 22 January 1963 in Moline, Illinois. In 1981, at the age of 18, he graduated from Rock Island High School.

=== Education ===
BeDuhn earned a B.A. in Religious Studies from the University of Illinois at Urbana–Champaign in 1985, graduating magna cum laude with departmental distinction and election to Phi Beta Kappa. In 1988, he received a M.T.S. in New Testament and Early Christianity from Harvard Divinity School. In 1995, BeDuhn earned a Ph.D. in the Comparative Study of Religions from Indiana University Bloomington. His doctoral dissertation, titled The Metabolism of Salvation: The Manichaean Body in Ascesis and Ritual, received special recognition and honors.

=== Teaching ===
BeDuhn began his academic career at Indiana University, where he served as Instructor from 1992 to 1995. Following the completion of his doctoral studies, he held several visiting appointments, including Visiting Assistant Professor of Religious Studies at Indiana University in Fall 1995, Visiting Assistant Professor of Philosophy and Religious Studies at Western Maryland College in Spring 1996, and Visiting Assistant Professor in both the Departments of Religious Studies and History at Indiana University from 1996 to 1997. He then served as Associate Instructor in the Department of Philosophy and Religion at the University of Indianapolis during the 1997–1998 academic year, followed by an appointment as Visiting Assistant Professor in the Department of History at Indiana University in 1998. These positions laid the foundation for his subsequent tenure at Northern Arizona University, where he advanced through the academic ranks to become a full professor.

From 2000 to 2004, he was Chair of the Department of Humanities, Arts, and Religion.

BeDuhn has taught courses in religious studies, biblical studies, and ancient history over a number of years. His course offerings included Religions of the World; Introduction to Asian Religions, Hebrew Bible (Old Testament); Christian Scriptures (New Testament); Early Christian Life & Literature; and The Historical Jesus. He also taught Ancient Gods and Goddesses; Art and Religion in the Ancient World; Ancient Egypt, Mespotamia, & the Mediterranean; Decline and Fall of the Roman Empire; Ancient History: Rome; and From Alexander to Ali. Additional courses include Church and World: The First Six Centuries; The Thousand Faces of Jesus; Gnostics and Manichaeans; arly Alternative Christianities; Religion and Social Issues; Ways of Being Religious; Jews, Christians, Muslims; Introduction to Christianity; Women in the Biblical World; and Augustine's Conversions.

=== Awards ===
- Robert F. and Margaret S. Goheen Fellowship, National Humanities Center, 2010
- National Endowment for the Humanities Collaborative Research Grant, 2009 – 2012
- Northern Arizona Intramural Grant, 2008 – 2009
- John Simon Guggenheim Fellowship, 2004 – 2005
- Best First Book Award from the American Academy of Religion in 2001 for his book The Manichaean Body in Discipline and Ritual, notable for its analysis of religions as goal-oriented systems of practice rationalized within particular models of reality.
- Northern Arizona University Organized Research Grant, 2000
- Northern Arizona University Organized Research Grant, 1999
- American Academy of Religion Research Grant, 1996
- Indiana University Distinguished Dissertation, 1995
- National Endowment for the Humanities Dissertation Fellowship, 1994 –1995
- J. Stewart and Dagmar K. Riley Dissertation Fellowship, 1993 – 1994

== Research ==
=== Manichaeism and Augustine ===
Much of BeDuhn's published research relates to Manichaeism, particularly its disciplinary and ritual systems, but also its role as a catalyst in religious history, as well as its distinctive interpretation of Christian traditions related to the teachings of Jesus and Paul. In 2010 and 2013, BeDuhn published a two-part work entitled Augustine's Manichaean Dilemma in which he considers "the deep imprint of Manicheanism on Augustine". BeDuhn considers that the conversion of Augustine from Manichaeism to Nicene Christianity was not a sudden act but a life-long transformation, with the narrative we now have being the product of Augustine's own idealized retrospect. BeDuhn roots Augustine's dissatisfaction with the Manichaean faith in his mentor's emphasis on practice over theoretical questions, along with external social pressures leading him towards apostasy. The 383 AD law ordered by Flavius Hypatius that condemned anyone who converted from Christianity to Paganism, Judaism, or Manichaeism is cited as one of these strong social pressures.

=== Marcionite priority ===
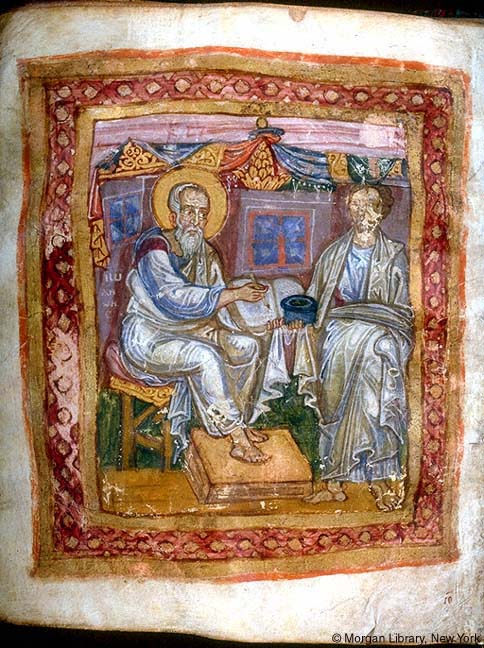
The Apostle John and, according to Robert Eisler's interpretation, Marcion of Sinope, c. 11th century.

Beginning with his book The First New Testament: Marcion's Scriptural Canon, reconstructing the recoverable content of the Marcionite Evangelion and Apostolikon, BeDuhn has stated that the Gospel of Marcion (called simply 'The Gospel' by adherents of Marcionism) was not produced nor adapted by Marcion of Sinope, but instead adopted by him from a pre-existing gospel text from which he says the Gospel of Luke is also derived.

BeDuhn suggests that Luke may be a post-Marcion redaction, but maintains a form of the two-source hypothesis, with Marcion's Gospel interchanged with Luke as the product of a combination of Mark and Q. This differs slightly from Matthias Klinghardt's view that Marcion's gospel was based on the Gospel of Mark, with the Gospel of Matthew based on Mark and Marcion, and the Gospel of Luke expanding on Marcion with reference to Matthew and Mark. These views contrast with assertions of some Church Fathers and the belief of some biblical scholars such as Bruce Metzger and Bart Ehrman that Marcion redacted the Gospel of Luke in accordance with his personal theology. Theologian Adolf von Harnack also accepted the view of the Church Fathers that Marcion wished to "purify" the Evangelion to an original state given by Christ and defy the fabricated Gospel of Luke, all without appealing to revelation.

== Projects ==
BeDuhn has been involved in a collaborative project to edit and translate an ancient Coptic Manichaean manuscript, the Chester Beatty Kephalaia, with funding from the National Endowment for the Humanities and the Australian Research Council.

== Bibliography ==
=== Thesis ===
- BeDuhn, Jason (1995). The Metabolism of Salvation: the Manichaean Body in Ascesis and Ritual (Bloomington, Ind., Indiana University, PhD Diss.). OCLC 312839137.

=== Books authored ===
- ————— (2000). The Manichaean Body in Discipline and Ritual. Baltimore: Johns Hopkins University Press. ISBN 978-0801862700. OCLC 51494045.
- ————— (2003). Truth in Translation: Accuracy and Bias in English Translations of the New Testament. Lanham: University Press of America. doi:10.5040/9780761876250. ISBN 978-0761825562. OCLC 52127593.
- ————— (2010). Augustine's Manichaean Dilemma, 1: Conversion and Apostasy, 373–388 C.E. Divinations. Philadelphia: University of Pennsylvania Press. ISBN 978-1283898386. OCLC 802048882.
- ————— (2013). Augustine's Manichaean Dilemma, 2: Making a Catholic Self, 388–401 C.E. Philadelphia: University of Pennsylvania Press. ISBN 978-0812207859. OCLC 859161485.
- ————— (2013). The First New Testament: Marcion's Scriptural Canon. Salem, Oregon: Polebridge Press. ISBN 978-1598151312. OCLC 857141226.
- —————; Iain Gardner; Paul Dilley (2014). Mani at the Court of the Persian Kings: Studies in the Cheaster Beatty Kephalaia Codex. Nag Hammadi and Manichaean studies. Vol. 87. Leiden, Netherlands: Brill. doi:10.1163/9789004282629. ISBN 978-9004234703. OCLC 961532862.
- —————; Iain Gardner; Paul Dilley (2018-07-14). The chapters of the wisdom of my Lord Mani. Part III. Nag Hammadi and Manichaean studies. Vol. 92. Leiden: Koninklijke Brill NV. pp. 343–442 (chapters 321-347). doi:10.1163/9789004363403. ISBN 978-9004363366. OCLC 1043913619. S2CID 166157220.

=== Books edited ===
- BeDuhn, J.; Mirecki, Paul A., eds. (1997-03-01). Emerging from Darkness: Studies in the Recovery of Manichaean Sources. Nag Hammadi and Manichaean Studies. Vol. 43. Leiden: Brill. doi:10.1163/9789004439726. ISBN 978-90-04-10760-1. OCLC 851337710.
- —————; Mirecki, Paul, eds. (2001-06-28). The Light and the Darkness: Studies in Manichaeism and its World. Nag Hammadi and Manichaean Studies. Vol. 50. Leiden: E. J. Brill. doi:10.1163/9789004439900. ISBN 978-90-04-11673-3.
- —————; Mirecki, Paul, eds. (2007-08-29). Frontiers of Faith: The Christian-Manichaean Encounter in the Acts of Archelaus. Nag Hammadi and Manichaean Studies. Vol. 61. Leiden: E. J. Brill. doi:10.1163/ej.9789004161801. ISBN 978-90-04-16180-1.
- —————, ed. (2009). New Light on Manichaeism: Papers from the 6th International Meeting of the IAMS. Leiden: E. J. Brill. ISBN 978-90-04-17285-2.

=== Articles ===
- BeDuhn, Jason (2015). "The New Marcion: Rethinking The Arch-Heretic". Forum. 3 (Fall 2015): 163–179.

== Book reviews ==
The Manichaean Body in Discipline and Ritual

- Anderson, Wendy Love (2001). "The Manichaean Body in Discipline and Ritual by Jason David BeDuhn". The Journal of Religion. 81 (3): 504–05. JSTOR 1206442.
- Bonner, G. (2010). "Augustine's Manichaean dilemma, I: Conversion and apostasy, 373–388 C.E. By Jason David BeDuhn. (Divinations. Rereading Late Ancient Religion.) Pp. viii+402. Philadelphia: University of Pennsylvania Press, 2010(9). £45 ($69.96). 978 0 8122 4210 2". The Journal of Ecclesiastical History. 61 (4): 804–806. doi:10.1017/S0022046910001259.
- Buckley, Jorunn J. (2003). "The Manichaean Body: In Discipline and Ritual by Jason David BeDuhn". History of Religions. 42 (3): 271–72. doi:10.1086/375106.
- Durkin-Meisterernst, Desmond (2002). "The Manichaean Body in Discipline and Ritual by Jason David Beduhn". Bulletin of the School of Oriental and African Studies. 65 (1). University of London: 173–75. JSTOR 4145920.
- Hodges, Horace Jeffery (2003). "The Manichaean Body: In Discipline and Ritual by Jason David BeDuhn". Journal of the American Academy of Religion. 71 (1): 191–94. JSTOR 1466313.
- Lieu, Samuel N. C. (2002). "The Manichaean Body in Discipline and Ritual by Jason David BeDuhn". The Catholic Historical Review. 88 (3): 564–67. JSTOR 25026215.

The First New Testament. Marcion's Scriptural Canon

- Le Boulluec, Alain (2016). "The First New Testament. Marcion's Scriptural Canon". L'Antiquité Classique. 85: 353–56. JSTOR 90005523.
- Frankfurter, David (2015). "The First New Testament: Marcion's Scriptural Canon by Jason David BeDuhn". The Catholic Biblical Quarterly. 77 (3): 546–48. JSTOR 43901005.

Truth in Translation

- Andrews, Edward D. (2023-06-21). "Jason BeDuhn. Truth in Translation: Accuracy and Bias in English Translations of the New Testament. Lanham, MD: University Press of America, 2003. $33.00, paperback, 191 p." Christian Publishing House.
- Harris, Jason (2009-08-20). "A brief review of BeDuhn's 'Truth in Translation'".
- Howe, Thomas A. (2010). "Bias in New Testament Translations?".
- Lundquist, Lynn. "Truth in Translation, Accuracy and Bias in English Translations of the New Testament, by Jason David BeDuhn, University Press of America, Lanham, Maryland, 2003".
- Porter, Mike (2008-05-29). "Truth in Translation: Grading the Professor".
- Price, Robert M. (2009). "Jason David BeDuhn, Truth in Translation: Accuracy and Bias in English Translations of the New Testament. University Press of America. 2003".

Augustine's Manichaean Dilemma

- Holt, Laura (2012). "Augustine's Manichaean Dilemma, Vol. I: Conversion and Apostasy, 373—388 C.E. Divinations: Rereading Late Ancient Religion by Jason David BeDuhn". Church History. 81 (4): 951–54. JSTOR 23358691.
- Kotzé, A. (2014). "Reviewed Work: Augustine's Manichaean Dilemma 2: Making a "Catholic" Self 388-401 C.E. by Jason David BeDuhn". Church History and Religious Culture. 94 (4). Brill: 534–537. doi:10.1163/18712428-09404012. JSTOR 43946123.
- Lieu, Samuel N. C. (2012). "Augustine's Manichaean Dilemma-1: Conversion and Apostasy, 373–388 CE by J. BeDuhn". The Journal of Religion. 92 (1): 131–33. doi:10.1086/663742.
- Van Fleteren, Frederick (2015). "Augustine's Manichean Dilemma. Vol. 2, Making a "Catholic" Self, 388–401 C.E by Jason David BeDuhn". The Journal of Religion. 95 (3): 401–03. doi:10.1086/681148.
- Van Oort, Johannes (2011). "Critical Evaluation of Jason BeDuhn's Augustine's Manichaean Dilemma in Context". Vigiliae Christianae. 65. Brill: 543–567. doi:10.1163/157007211X591830. hdl:2263/19375.

Rev. of New Light on Manichaeism: Papers from the Sixth International Congress on Manichaeism

- Pearson, Birger A. (2009-11-26). "Rev. of New Light on Manichaeism: Papers from the Sixth International Congress on Manichaeism - Edited by Jason David Beduhn". Religious Studies Review. 35 (4): 268–268. doi:10.1111/j.1748-0922.2009.01386_16.x.

== Sources ==
- BeDuhn, Jason D. (2003). "About the Author". Truth in Translation: Accuracy and Bias in English Translations of the New Testament. University Press of America. p. 200.
- Gardner, Iain, ed. (2020). The Founder of Manichaeism: Rethinking the Life of Mani. Cambridge University Press. ISBN 9781108499071.
- Minnich, Nelson H., ed. (2015). Journeys in Church History: Essays from the Catholic Historical Review. The Catholic University of America Press. p. 15. ISBN 978-0813228341.
