= Claire Clivaz =

Swiss pastor and theology scholar

Claire Clivaz (born 21 March 1971) is a Swiss pastor (discontinued) and theology scholar. Head of Digital Enhanced Learning at the Swiss Institute of Bioinformatics (Switzerland) (discontinued), she leads research at the crossroad of New Testament and Digital Humanities.

== Biography ==
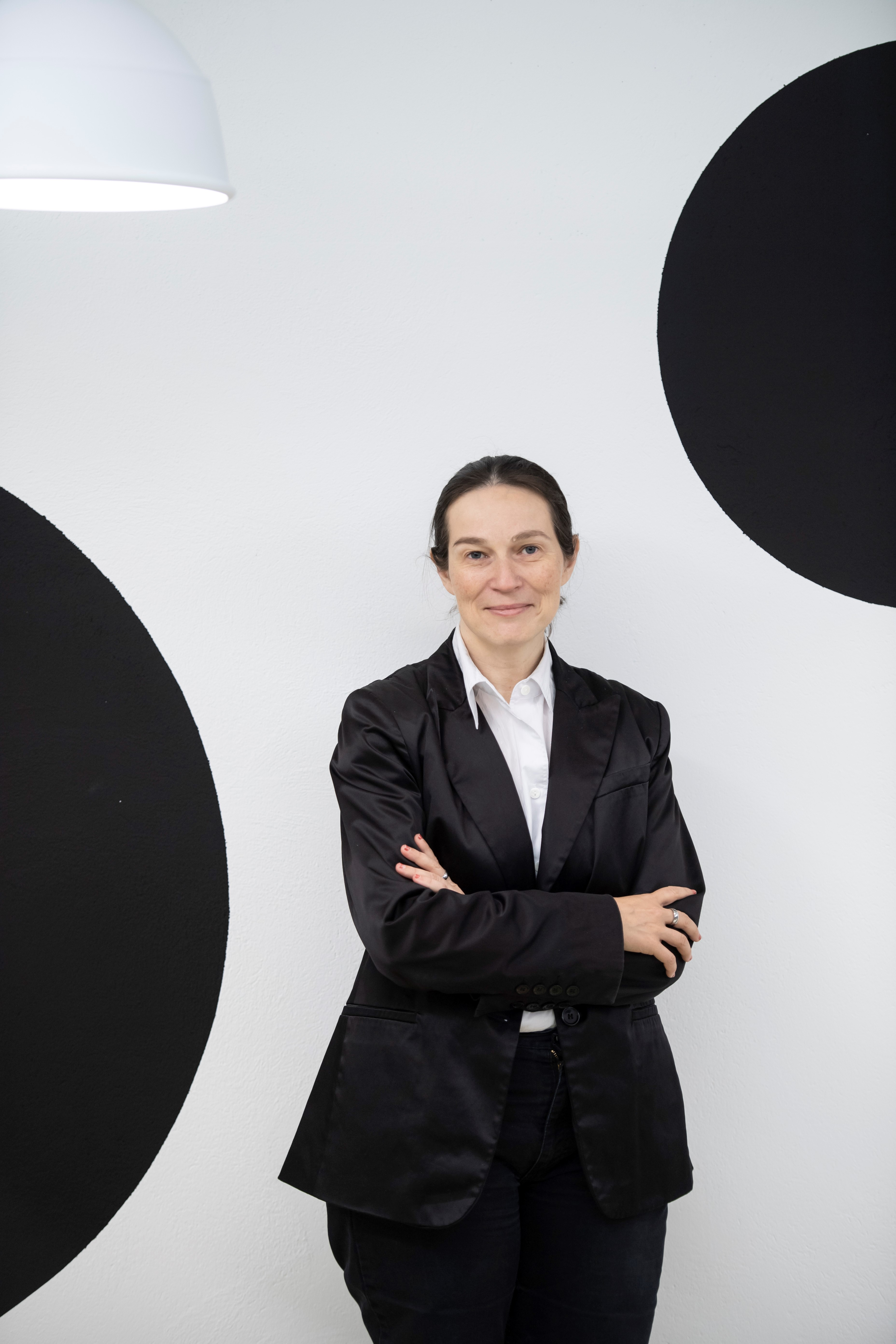
Claire Clivaz

Between 1995 and 1998, she was research assistant of Professor Pierre Gisel, and between 2005 and 2008, research assistant of Professor Daniel Marguerat. With a SNF grant, she studied with Professor François Bovon at Harvard. In 2007, she received a PhD in theology from the University of Lausanne on the topic "L'ange et la sueur de sang (Lc 22,43-44) ou comment on pourrait bien encore écrire l'histoire" at the University of Lausanne. Between 2008 and 2014, she was assistant professor of New Testament and Early Christian literature at the Faculty of Theology and Religious Studies of the University of Lausanne.

In 2005, Clivaz has suggested that Papyrus Oxyrhynchus 2383 (Papyrus 69 Gregory-Aland) is coherent with what we know about the Marcionite edition of Luke's Gospel. In 2009, she signaled to the Institute for New Testament Textual Research (INTF) the publication of Papyrus 126.

On October 22–24, 2009 Clivaz organized the conference «Egyptian New Testament Papyri among Others» that took place at the University of Lausanne. Since 2010, she has started with other colleagues in Lausanne activities in Digital Humanities, that have resulted in research projects, events such as the DH2014 meeting, and new developments, including her own present position at the Swiss Institute of Bioinformatics.

== Notable works ==
- Marguerat Daniel, Clivaz Claire, Les protestants s'aiment-ils? Postface à deux voix. In: Le protestantisme et son avenir. Genève: Labor et Fides, D. Marguerat - B. Reymond (éd.), pp. 135–144 (1995).
- «The Angel and the Sweat Like 'Drops of Blood' (Lk 22:43-44): P69 and f13», Harvard Theological Review 98 (2005/4), p. 419-440.
- "Asleep by grief' (Lk 22:45)": Reading from the Body at the Crossroads of Narratology and New Historicism. The Bible and Critical Theory 2(3), pp. 29.1-29.15. DDI: 10.2104/bc060029, 2006.
- L'ange et la sueur de sang (Lc 22,43-44) ou comment on pourrait bien écrire l'histoire (BiTS 7), Leuven: Peeters, 2009, 737p.
- “A New NT Papyrus: P126 (PSI 1497)”, Early Christianity 1 (2010).
- Clivaz, C. - Meizoz, J. - Vallotton, F. - Verheyden, J. (éd.), en collaboration avec Benjamin Bertho (eds.), Lire Demain. Des manuscrits antiques à l'ère digitale / Reading Tomorrow. From Ancient Manuscripts to the Digital Era, Lausanne: PPUR, 734 p., 2012]
- Clivaz, C.; Gregory, A.; Hamidovic, D., in collaboration with Schulthess, S. (eds.), Digital Humanities in Biblical, Early Jewish and Early Christian Studies. Scholarly Communication 2, Leiden: Brill, 2013.
- Clivaz, C., The Impact of Digital Research: Thinking about the MARK16 Project. "Open Theology" vol. 5 (2019), 1-12. Open Access: https://doi.org/10.1515/opth-2019-0001
- Clivaz, C., Ecritures digitales: Digital Writing, Digital Scriptures, Leiden, Nederland: Brill, 2019. DOI: https://doi.org/10.1163/9789004402560
