= Papyrus 126 =

- New Testament manuscript
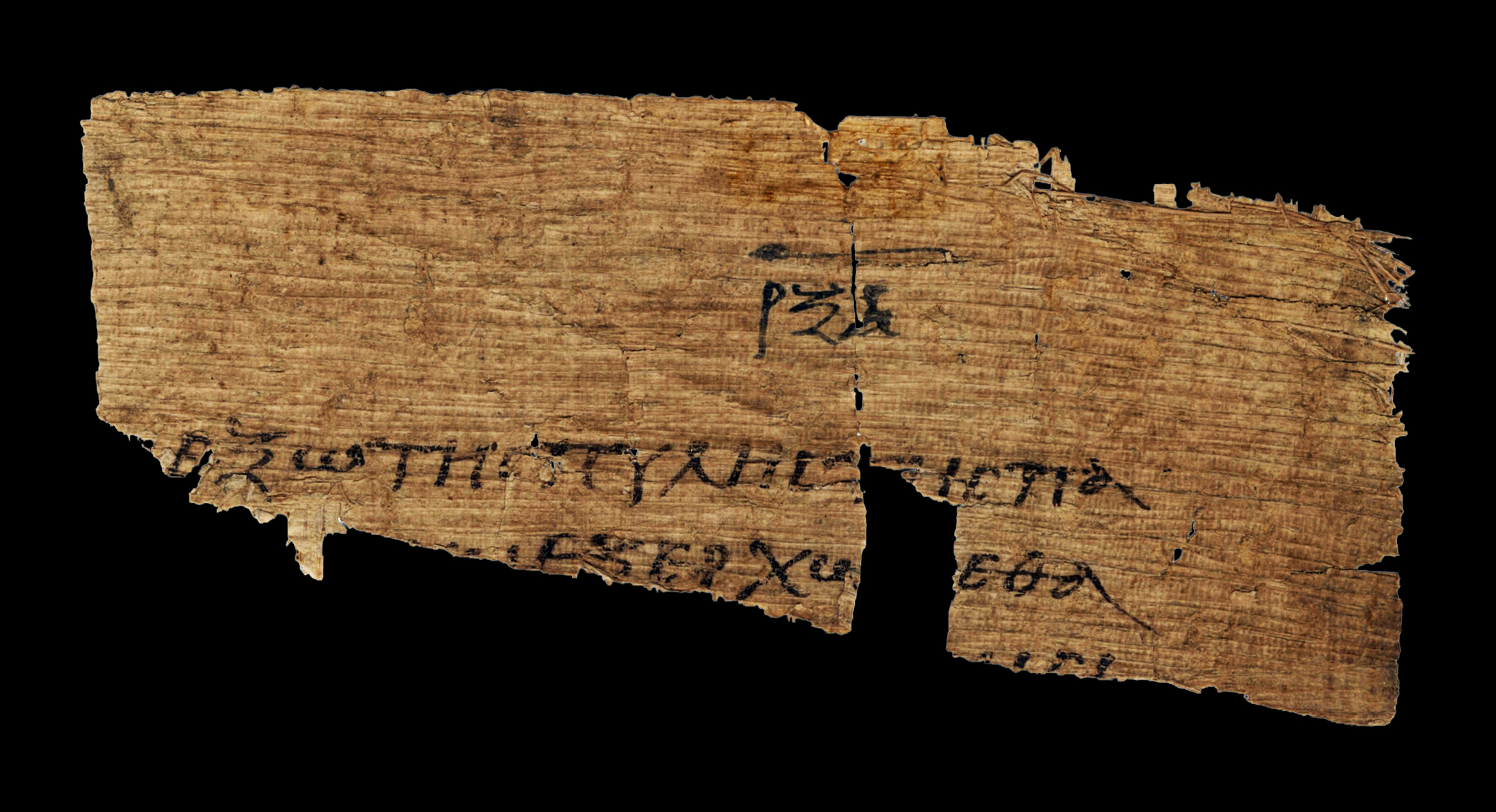
- Recto, Hebrews 13:12-13
- Sign: 𝔓^{126}
- Text: Epistle to the Hebrews 13:12-13.19-20
- Date: 4th century
- Script: Greek
- Now at: Instituto Papirologico "G. Vitelli"
- Cite: Bastianini, Guido, Papiri Greci e Latini, vol. 15, no. 1497, p. 171-172, Pubblicazioni della Società Italiana (2008)
- Size: 30 cm by 16 cm
- Type: ?
- Category: none

Papyrus 126 (in the Gregory-Aland numbering), designated by siglum 𝔓^{126}, is a copy of the New Testament in Greek. It is a papyrus manuscript of the Epistle to the Hebrews.

== Description ==
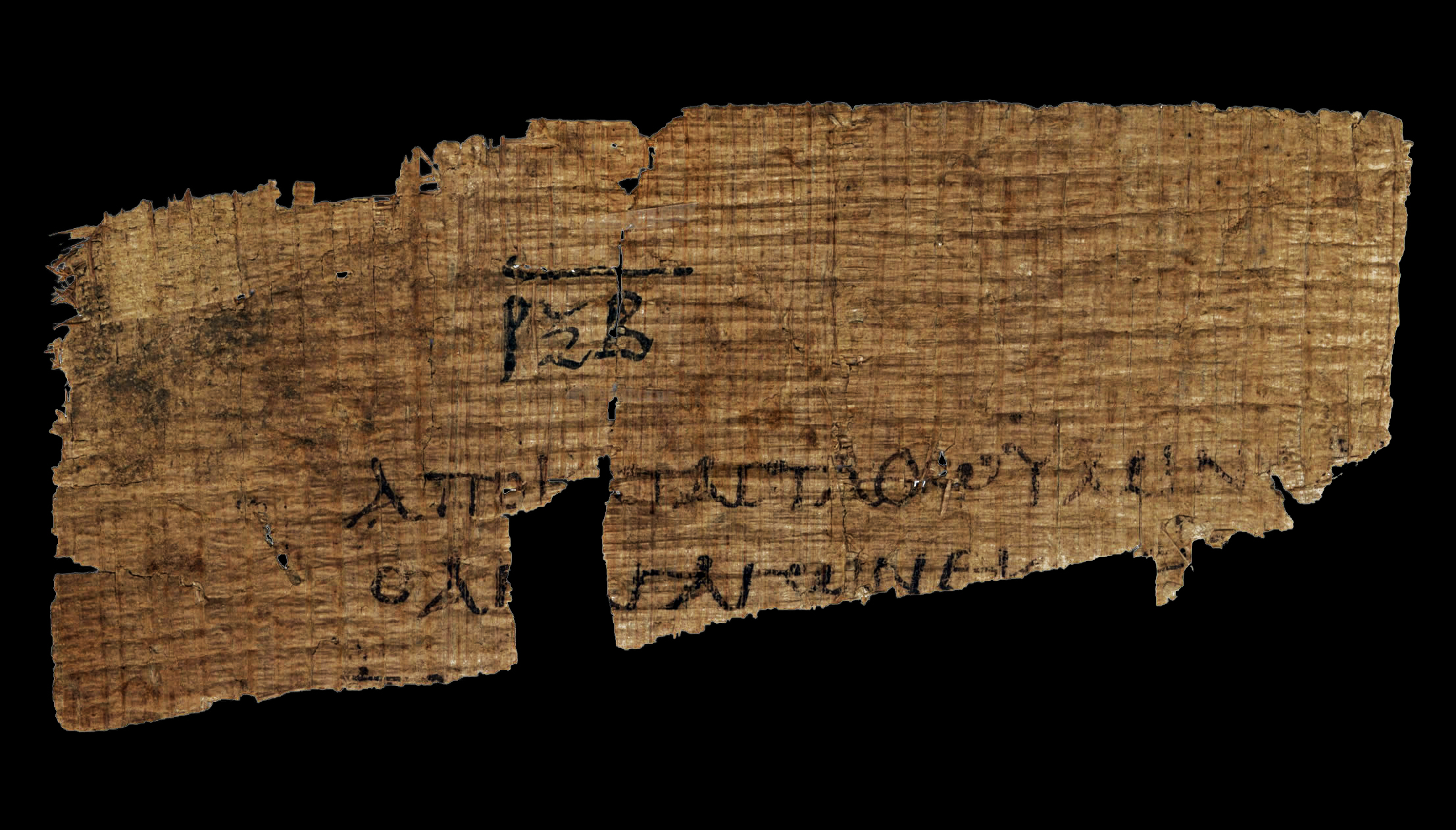
Verso, Hebrews 13:19-20

To the present day survived only fragment from one leaf. The surviving texts of Hebrews are verses 13:12-13.19-20, they are in a fragmentary condition. The manuscript palaeographically has been assigned to the 4th century (INTF).

The text is written in one column per page, 20 lines per page (originally). The size of the fragment is 3.7 by 9.1 cm (original size 30 cm by 16 cm).

== Textual Variant ==
In 13:12, Bastianini reconstructs the text as reading εξω της πυλης της παρεμβολης επαθεν, a unique reading that appears to conflate 𝔓^{46}'s reading εξω τησ παρεμβολησ επαθεν with the standard reading εξω της πυλης επαθεν (01 omits επαθεν).

== History ==
The manuscript was announced by the Papyrological Institute in Florence in 2003. The text of the codex was published in 2008. In 2009, Claire Clivaz signaled it to the Institute for New Testament Textual Research (INTF) and the manuscript was catalogued on the INTF list of the New Testament manuscripts.

The manuscript currently is housed at the Istituto Papirologico „G. Vitelli" at Florence with the shelf number PSI inv. 2176 (PSI XV 1497).

== See also ==
- List of New Testament papyri
- Biblical manuscript
