= Pastoral epistles =

Three books of the canonical New Testament

The pastoral epistles consist of three epistles from the canonical New Testament: the First Epistle to Timothy (1 Timothy), the Second Epistle to Timothy (2 Timothy), and the Epistle to Titus. They are presented as letters from Paul the Apostle to Timothy and to Titus, but many scholars believe that they were written after the death of Paul.

These three epistles are generally addressed as one group, their title "pastoral" having been popularized in 1703 by D. N. Berdot and in 1726 by Paul Anton, though alternative nomenclature for the three has been proposed: "Corpus Pastorale", intended to highlight that they comprise a three-part corpus of forged letters, and "Letters to Timothy and Titus", emphasizing the individuality of the letters and their intended recipients.

== 1 Timothy ==
1 Timothy consists mainly of counsels to Timothy regarding the forms of worship and organization of the church and the responsibilities resting on its several members, including bishops (Koine Greek: ἐπίσκοποι, lit. 'overseers') and deacons (διάκονοι, 'deacons'); and secondarily of exhortation to faithfulness in maintaining the truth amid surrounding errors (1 Tim. 4:1), presented as a prophecy of people renouncing the faith in the future.

The epistle's "irregular character, abrupt connexions and loose transitions" (Moffatt 1911) have led critics to discern later interpolations, such as the epistle's conclusion (1 Tim. 6:20-21, thought to be a reference to Marcion of Sinope), and lines that seem to be marginal glosses that were written into the body of the text by later scribes (including "the Son of God" found in some translations of Mark 1:1, such as the New English Translation).

== 2 Timothy ==
The author, identifying themselves as Paul the Apostle, urges Timothy to visit him before winter and to bring Mark with him (see also, Phil. 2:22), anticipating that "the time of my departure has come" (2 Tim. 4:6). He exhorts Timothy to all diligence and steadfastness in the face of false teachings, including advice on combating them with reference to the teachings of the past, and to patience under persecution (2 Tim. 1:6-15), and to a faithful discharge of all the duties of his office (2 Tim. 4:1-5), with all the solemnity of someone who will soon appear before the judge of the living and the dead.

== Titus ==
This short letter is traditionally divided into three chapters addressed to Titus, a Christian worker in Crete, concerning advice on the character and conduct required of Church leaders (Tit. 1), a structure and hierarchy for Christian teaching within the church (Tit. 2), and the kind of godly conduct and moral action required of Christians in response to God's grace and gift of the Holy Spirit (Tit. 3).

This epistle includes a curious quotation, supposedly from a Cretan source: "Cretans are always liars, vicious brutes, lazy gluttons" (Tit. 1:12).

== Pauline Authorship ==
Since the Epistles to Timothy were explicitly referenced by Irenaeus in his anti-Gnostic dissertation and were likely used by Polycarp in one of his own epistles, both before the 3rd-century CE, this sets an upper limit on the dates of the composition of these epistles, typically ranging from the late 1st-century CE to the mid 2nd-century CE.

=== Traditional view: affirming Pauline authorship ===
Traditionally, mostly prior to the 18th century, the pastoral epistles were identified as legitimate Pauline epistles since they were known among the Apostolic Fathers and early Christians.

Some scholars, such as Stanley Porter and Ray Van Neste, who still ascribe the pastoral epistles to Paul, believe that the linguistic differences are complementary to differences in the recipients. While other Pauline epistles address fledgling congregations, the recipients of the pastoral epistles are Paul's close companions, evangelists whom he has extensively worked with and trained. On this basis it is claimed that linguistic differences are to be expected, if Pauline authorship is ascribed to them.

=== Critical view: rejecting Pauline authorship ===
Since Friedrich Schleiermacher in 1807, scholars and textual critics have argued that much of the concern, vocabulary, and literary style prominent in these letters are more characteristic of writings by later Christians, and not of the uncontested Pauline epistles. Moreover, Paul's life as presented in these epistles arguably do not align with Paul's life as reconstructed from the uncontested epistles and other sources.

Thus, the pastoral epistles are typically regarded as pseudepigrapha, though The Second Epistle to Timothy is sometimes said to be the most likely of the three to have been written by Paul.

One qualitative style argument is about the duty of preserving tradition being entrusted to ordained elders in 1 Timothy, yet the sense of presbyteros (Greek: πρεσβύτερος, lit: 'elder') as an office would have been alien to Paul and others of his time (see also, James 5:14).

Another argument concerns gender roles. The pastoral epistles prohibit certain behaviors for women in a manner that appears to deviate from the more egalitarian teachings found in the uncontested Pauline epistles (see, Gal. 3:28). There is a passage in an authentic Pauline epistle that seems to command silence from women in churches, stating that "it is shameful for a woman to speak in church" (1 Corinth. 14:34-35), though the fact that this passage seems out of place in light of verses in the same epistle as well as in other authentic epistles leads many critics to believe that it is an interpolation by a later editor having read First Timothy (see also, 1 Tim. 2:11-15).

== Date ==
Irenaeus explicitly references the epistles to Timothy in his anti-Gnostic treatise Against Heresies (c. 180 CE), and it is probable that they were known and used by Polycarp in his epistle to the Philippians (which is not to be confused with the Pauline epistle to the Philippians). Since the death of Polycarp is dated to, at the latest, 167 AD, this would set an upper limit on the date of the composition of these epistles.

While Origen does not explicitly reference the Epistles to Timothy and Titus, he does make reference to "the fourteen epistles of Paul." Still, it is believed that he wrote a commentary on at least the Epistle to Titus.

The Muratorian fragment (c. 2nd-century CE), the author thereof being unidentified, also lists the pastoral epistles among others, though notably excluding others that are traditionally attributed to Paul.

Several scholars have argued that the pastoral epistles were composed as polemics against certain 2nd-century developments like Marcionism and Gnosticism. If it is granted that Marcion began his ministry only after his excommunication from the Roman church in 144 AD, then 144–167 is a reasonable range of possible dates for the finalization of these epistles.

== Text ==
The pastoral epistles are omitted in many early manuscripts, such as the P. Chester Beatty II (c. late 2nd-century CE), the oldest exhaustive manuscript of the Pauline epistles, and the Codex Vaticanus (c. 4th-century CE), one of the oldest Bible codices.

Later papyri, such as 𝔓^{32} (c. early 3rd-century CE) and 𝔓^{61} (c. 8th-century CE), do include the pastoral epistles. Concerning the codices, David W. Pao considers the Codex Sinaiticus to be “one of the most reliable witnesses for the [Pastoral Epistles], though it contains a series of unintentional omissions (1 Tim 2:6 [τό]; 3:8 [σεμνούς]; 4:8 [πρός]; Titus 1:13 [ἐν])”.

== See also ==
- Authorship of the Pauline epistles
