= Albert Schwegler =

German philosopher and Protestant theologian (1819–1857)

Albert Schwegler (10 February 1819 – 5 January 1857) was a German philosopher and Protestant theologian.

== Biography ==
Schwegler was born at Michelbach in Württemberg, the son of a country pastor. He entered the University of Tübingen in 1836, and was one of the earliest pupils of F. C. Baur, under whose influence he devoted himself to church history. His first work was Der Montanismus und die christliche Kirche des Zweiten Jahrhunderts (1841), in which he pointed out for the first time that Montanism was much more than an isolated outbreak of eccentric fanaticism in the early church, though he himself introduced fresh misconceptions by connecting it with Ebionitism as he conceived the latter. This work, with other essays, brought him into conflict with the authorities of the church, in consequence of which he gave up theology as his professional study and chose that of philosophy.

In 1843 he founded the Jahrbücher der Gegenwart, and became privatdozent of philosophy and classical philology at Tübingen University. In 1848 he was made an associate professor of Roman literature and archaeology, and soon afterwards a full professor of history.

He died in Tübingen.

== Work ==
His principal theological work was Das nachapostolische Zeitalter in den Hauptmomenten seiner Entwicklung (The Post-Apostolic Age in the Principal Moments of its Development) (2 volumes, 1846). It was this book which first put before the world, with Schwegler's characteristic boldness and clearness, the results of the critical labours of the earlier representatives of the new Tübingen school in relation to the first development of Christianity.

Schwegler published also an edition of the Clementine Homilies (1847), and of Eusebius's Ecclesiastical History (1852). His work on the history of philosophy includes his excellent Geschichte der Philosophie im Umriß (History of Philosophy in Epitome, 1846–1847, 14th ed. 1887; 1st edition of English translation by James Hutchison Stirling titled Handbook of the History of Philosophy, 1867; 5th edition of English translation by Julius Hawley Seelye titled History of Philosophy in Epitome, 1877), his Übersetzung und Erläuterung der aristotelischen Metaphysik (4 volumes, 1847–48), and a posthumous Geschichte der griechischen Philosophie (History of Greek Philosophy; 1859).

In history he began a Römische Geschichte (vols. i.–iii., 1853–58, 2nd edition 1867–72), which he brought down only to the laws of Licinius.
