= Matthias Klinghardt =

German Protestant theologian (1957-)

Matthias Klinghardt (born August 24, 1957 in Waldshut-Tiengen) is a German Protestant theologian and university professor. His theological specialty is the New Testament. He is a proponent of the Marcion hypothesis for the synoptic problem and the gospel of John.

== Education ==
From 1976 to 1982 Klinghardt studied Protestant Theology at the Kirchliche Hochschule Wuppertal/Bethel, the University of Tübingen and the University of Heidelberg.

This was followed by the first church service test at the Evangelische Landeskirche in Baden. In 1986 he received his doctorate from the Evangelical Theological Faculty of Heidelberg University under Klaus Berger. His dissertation was supported by a scholarship from the Studienstiftung des Deutschen Volkes from 1983 to the end of 1986. This was followed by a research and teaching stay in the United States from 1988 to 1989, during this one-year study stay he was an assistant professor at the Department of Religious Studies, Rice University in Houston (Texas).

== Career ==
From 1989 to 1998 Klinghardt was in Augsburg, where he worked as a scientific assistant or senior assistant at the chair "Evangelische Theologie mit Schwerpunkt Biblische Theologie" (Evangelical Theology with a Focus on Biblical Theology) of the Institute for Evangelical Theology of the Faculty of Philosophy I. In 1994 he went to the Faculty of Protestant Theology at the University of Heidelberg in the area of New Testament.

Since 1998 he has been Professor of Biblical Theology in the Institute for Evangelical Theology of the Faculty of Philosophy at the TU Dresden. Klinghardt is married and has three children.

== Works ==
- Gesetz und Volk Gottes. Das lukanische Verständnis des Gesetzes nach Herkunft, Funktion und seinem Ort in der Geschichte des Urchristentums. (WUNT II/32), Tübingen 1988
- Gemeinschaftsmahl und Mahlgemeinschaft. Francke, Tübingen 1996
- Markion vs. Lukas: Plädoyer für die Wiederaufnahme eines alten Falles.New Testament Studies, Volume 52(4); Oktober 2006, S. 484–513, doi:10.1017/S0028688506000270
- The Marcionite Gospel and the Synoptic Problem: A New Suggestion. Novum Testamentum 50 (2008), 1–27
- Das Aposteldekret als kanonischer Integrationstext: Konstruktion und Begründung von Gemeinsinn. In: Markus Öhler (edit.): Aposteldekret und antikes Vereinswesen. Gemeinschaft und ihre Ordnung WUNT 280, Mohr Siebeck, Tübingen 2011, ISBN 978-3-16-150363-4, S. 91–112
- Inspiration und Fälschung. Die Transzendenzkonstitution der christlichen Bibel. In: Hans Vorländer (edit.): Transzendenz und die Konstitution von Ordnungen. De Gruyter, Berlin/New York 2013, ISBN 978-3-11-030075-8, S. 331–355
- Das älteste Evangelium und die Entstehung der kanonischen Evangelien. Untersuchung – Rekonstruktion – Übersetzung – Varianten. 2 Bände. Francke, Tübingen 2015, ISBN 978-3-7720-8549-9. auf books.google.de, Bd. 1
  - The Oldest Gospel and the Formation of the Canonical Gospels: Inquiry. Reconstruction - Translation - Variants, Leiven, Peeters, 2020
- Das marcionitische Evangelium und die Textgeschichte des Neuen Testaments. Eine Antwort an Thomas Johann Bauer und Ulrich B. Schmid. Zeitschrift für Antikes Christentum 21 (2017), 110–120
- Das Neue Testament und sein Text im 2.Jahrhundert. Texte und Arbeiten zum neutestamentlichen Zeitalter. Vol. 61. Heilmann, Jan; Klinghardt, Matthias, eds. (2018). Tübingen, Germany: Narr Francke Attempto Verlag GmbH. ISBN 978-3-7720-8640-3.
