= List of wardens of Keble College, Oxford =

A list of Wardens of Keble College, Oxford. The head of Keble College, University of Oxford is called the Warden. The current Warden is Dame Sarah Whatmore, since October 2026.

== List of Wardens ==
- Edward Stuart Talbot 1870–1888
- Robert Wilson 1888–1897
- Walter Lock 1897–1920
- Beresford Kidd 1920–1939
- Harry James Carpenter 1939–1955
- Eric Symes Abbott 1956–1960
- Austin Farrer 1960–1968
- Spencer Barrett (Acting Warden, 1968–1969)
- Dennis Nineham 1969–1979
- Christopher Ball 1980–1988
- George Barclay Richardson 1988–1994
- Dame Averil Cameron 1994–2010
- Sir Jonathan Phillips, 2010–2022
- Sir Michael Jacobs, 2022–2026
- Dame Sarah Whatmore, 2026–present
