= Sarah Whatmore (geographer) =

British critical geographer

Dame Sarah Whatmore DBE FBA FAcSS
- Born: Aldershot, Hampshire
- Education: University College London
- Known for: Critical geography
- Scientific career
- Fields: Human-Environment geography, critical geography
- Workplaces: University of Oxford
- Thesis: The 'other half' of the family farm: an analysis of the position of 'farm wives' in the familial gender division of labor on the farm (1988)
- Doctoral advisor: Richard Munton

Dame Sarah Jane Whatmore DBE FBA FAcSS (born 25 September 1959) is a British geographer. She is a professor of environment and public policy at Oxford University, and the current Warden of Keble College. She is a professorial fellow at Keble College, moving from Linacre College in 2012. She was associate head (research) of the Social Sciences Division of the university from 2014 to 2016, and became pro-vice chancellor (education) of Oxford in January 2017. From 2018 she has been head of the Social Sciences Division.

In 2020 Whatmore was appointed Dame Commander of the Order of the British Empire (DBE) for her services to the study of environmental policy, particularly her research into flood risk management and environmental decision-making.

== Early life and education ==
Whatmore was born in Aldershot, Hampshire, in 1959 and grew up in a military family, living in various countries (including Germany, Cyprus, and Hong Kong) during her childhood. She studied geography at University College London, earning a Bachelor of Arts (BA) degree in 1981. She then completed an M.Phil. in Town Planning at the UCL Bartlett School in 1983, with research focusing on Financial institutions and the ownership of agricultural land. Afterward she worked at the Greater London Council. She returned to UCL for a PhD supervised by Richard Munton (The 'other half' of the family farm: an analysis of the position of 'farm wives' in the familial gender division of labor on the farm, 1988).

She lives in Upton, Oxfordshire.

== Career ==
After completing her doctorate, Whatmore began her academic career as a lecturer. She taught briefly at the University of Leeds before joining the University of Bristol in 1989 as a Lecturer in Human Geography. She spent 12 years at Bristol's School of Geographical Sciences, during which she was promoted to a professorship in Human Geography in 1999. Her scholarly contributions were recognized with the award of a Doctor of Science (D.Sc.) degree by published research from Bristol in 2000.

In 2001, Whatmore moved to the Open University, where she was appointed Professor of Environmental Geography and continued her interdisciplinary research and teaching. In 2004, Whatmore joined the University of Oxford as the Professor of Environment and Public Policy and became a professorial fellow initially at Linacre College, later moving to Keble College in 2012.

At Oxford, she took on a number of leadership and administrative roles. She served as Head of the School of Geography and the Environment. From 2014 to 2016 she was Associate Head (Research) of Oxford's Social Sciences Division, and in January 2017 she became Pro-Vice-Chancellor (Education), responsible for the university's academic strategy in teaching and learning. In 2018, Whatmore was appointed Head of the Social Sciences Division at Oxford.

Throughout her career, Whatmore has also contributed to the broader academic community. She has held visiting scholar positions at institutions abroad, including the University of California, Santa Cruz, the University of Wisconsin–Madison, the University of Newcastle (Australia), and the University of Trondheim (Norway).

She is a fellow of several learned societies, including the British Academy, the Academy of Social Sciences, and of the Royal Geographical Society.

== Scholarship ==
In the early part of her career, Whatmore's research focused on rural geography and the sociology of agriculture. She co-edited the book Technological Change and the Rural Environment (1990), examining how farming and rural life were being transformed by economic and technological forces. She also investigated gender relations in rural contexts, as seen in her doctoral work on farm women.

By the late 1990s, however, Whatmore's intellectual trajectory shifted toward the emerging critical geography of environmental issues. She has questioned Marxist materialist approaches in favour of actor-network theory and feminist science studies. Her approach, laid out in her 2002 book Hybrid Geographies, attempts to develop what she terms "more than human" modes of inquiry, and question the relationship between science and democracy. Hybrid Geographies has been cited over 3,955 times according to Google Scholar.

Another major theme of Whatmore's research is the relationship between scientific expertise and democratic engagement in environmental governance. Her research focuses on the treatment of evidence and role of expertise in environmental governance, against growing reliance on computer modelling techniques. It is characterized by a commitment to experimental and collaborative research practices that bring the different knowledge competences of social and natural scientists into play with those of diverse local publics living with environmental risks and hazards like floods and droughts. For example, her research on flood risk management developed participatory "community modelling" techniques, enabling local residents to work alongside scientists in modeling flood scenarios and co-producing knowledge about flood prevention. Her ideas were developed further in Political Matter (Whatmore & Braun eds. 2010).

Her critical ideas have been well received by theorists, but less so by policy-oriented environmental thinkers and traditional geographers less inclined to "theorise" human-environment relationships. Nonetheless, she has been a member of the Science Advisory Council to the Department for Environment, Food and Rural Affairs (DEFRA) and chair of its Social Science Expert Group; a member of the Science Advisory Group established to advise the Cabinet Office's National Flood Resilience Review (2016), and as a member of the board of the Parliamentary Office of Science and Technology.

== Policy engagement and public service ==
Beyond her academic research, Sarah Whatmore has been active in applying geographical insights to public policy and environmental management. She has served in multiple advisory roles for the UK government. From 2015 to 2020, Whatmore was an appointed member of the Science Advisory Council of the Department for Environment, Food and Rural Affairs (Defra). In this capacity, she also chaired Defra's Social Science Expert Group (2016–2020), a specialist panel providing social science advice on environmental policy issues.

In 2016, following severe national floods in the UK, Whatmore was invited to join the Government Chief Scientific Adviser's Science Advisory Group for the National Flood Resilience Review.

Within the academic and professional community, Whatmore's leadership in bridging science and society has been notable. As Oxford's Academic Champion for Public Engagement with Research, she has promoted initiatives to involve the public in research processes and to communicate scholarly work to non-specialist audiences. She frequently gives public lectures on environmental issues.

== Honours and awards ==
- 2013: Ellen Churchill Semple award, Department of Geography, University of Kentucky
- 2014: Fellow of the British Academy, the United Kingdom's national academy for the humanities and social sciences.
- Fellow, Academy of Social Sciences
- DSc, University of Bristol.
- 2020: Dame Commander of the Order of the British Empire (DBE) in the 2020 New Year Honours for services to the study of environmental policy

== Selected bibliography ==
- Whatmore, Sarah; Braun, Bruce (2010). Political matter technoscience, democracy, and public life. Minneapolis, Minnesota: University of Minnesota Press. ISBN 9780816670895.
- Gregory, Derek; Johnston, Ron; Pratt, Geraldine; Watts, Michael; Whatmore, Sarah, eds. (2009). The dictionary of human geography (5th ed.). Chichester (U.K.): Wiley-Blackwell. ISBN 978-1-4051-3288-6.
- Nigel Thrift and Sarah Whatmore (eds.). 2004. Cultural geography: critical concepts in the social sciences. London: Routledge.
- Pryke, Michael; Rose, Gillian; Whatmore, Sarah (2003). Using social theory : thinking through research (Reprint. ed.). London: SAGE Publications in association with the Open University. ISBN 9780761943778.
- Whatmore, Sarah (2002). Hybrid geographies: natures, cultures, spaces. London Thousand Oaks, California: SAGE Publications. ISBN 9780761965671.
- Sarah Whatmore, Terry Marsden, Philip Lowe (eds.) 1994. Gender and rurality. London: David Fulton Publishers.
- Philip Lowe, Terry Marsden, Sarah Whatmore (eds.). 1994. Regulating agriculture. London: David Fulton Publishers.
- Sarah Whatmore. 1991. Farming women: gender, work and family enterprise. Basingstoke: Macmillan.
- Terry Marsden, Philip Lowe, Sarah Whatmore (eds) 1992. Labour and locality: uneven development and the rural labour process. London: David Fulton Publishers.
- Terry Marsden, Philip Lowe, Sarah Whatmore (eds.). 1990. Rural restructuring: global processes and their responses. London: David Fulton Publishers.
- Philip Lowe, Terry Marsden, Sarah Whatmore (eds.). 1990. Technological change and the rural environment. London: David Fulton Publishers.

Academic offices
Preceded by Sir Michael Jacobs	Warden of Keble College, Oxford; 2026–present
