= Gospel of Matthew =

Book of the New Testament

- Gospel of Mark →
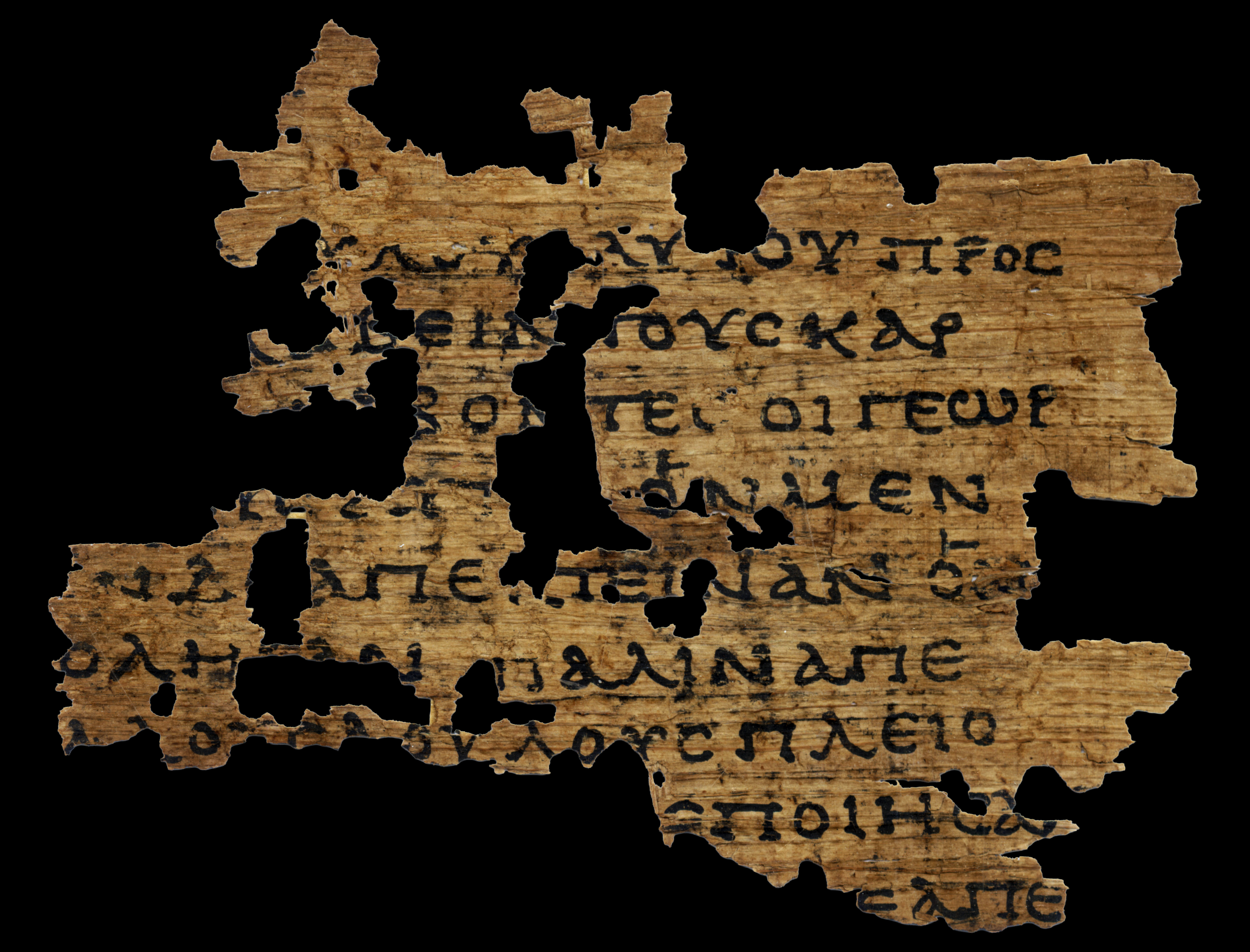
- Matthew 21:34–37 on Papyrus 104 (recto; c. AD 150)

Information
- Religion: Christianity
- Author: Traditionally Matthew the Apostle
- Language: Koinē Greek
- Period: c. 80–90 AD
- Chapters: 28
- Verses: 1071

Full text
- Gospel of Matthew at Greek Wikisource
- Gospel of Matthew at English Wikisource

The Gospel of Matthew (Note: The book is sometimes called the Gospel according to Matthew (Greek: Κατὰ Ματθαῖον/Μαθθαῖον Εὐαγγέλιον, romanized: Katà Mat(h)thaîon Euangélion), or simply Matthew. It is most commonly abbreviated as "Matt.") is the first book of the New Testament, one of the four canonical Gospels, and one of the three synoptic Gospels. It tells of Jesus, recording his birth, his ministry from his baptism by John the Baptist, his crucifixion, his resurrection, and his mission to the world. It emphasizes that Jewish tradition should not be lost in an increasingly gentile church and presents Jesus as the Jewish Messiah who fulfills the prophecies written in the Jewish scriptures.

The gospel reflects conflicts between Jewish Christians and other Jews, particularly with its criticism of the scribes and Pharisees, presenting the view that the Kingdom of Heaven has been taken away from them and given to the church. It emphasizes Jesus’s role as the Son of David, Son of Man, and Son of God, and frames his teachings, miracles, and parables to reflect both Jewish law and the Christian church. It culminates in the Passion, Resurrection, and Great Commission, having been structured around alternating narratives and discourses.

The gospel was written in the last quarter of the first century anonymously by a Jewish author who was familiar with legal aspects of scripture and the Hebrew language. Papias of Hierapolis, a companion of the Elder and the daughters of Philip, provides the first attribution to Matthew. The text may incorporate a source from Matthew, and traditional authorship still has conservative defenders. The gospel was highly popular among early Christians; scholars increasingly contend that it was used by both Luke and John. Most scholars believe that Matthew used Mark and the Q source, but a growing number of scholars are skeptical of Q and advocate for the Farrer hypothesis or Matthean Posteriority instead.

The Synoptics follow Mark closely compared to other ancient historians’ usage of sources, though the parallels and variations are typical of ancient historical biographies. The text is the product of the second generation of the Christian movement, although it draws on the memory of the first generation of the disciples of Jesus.

== Composition ==
=== Author and date ===
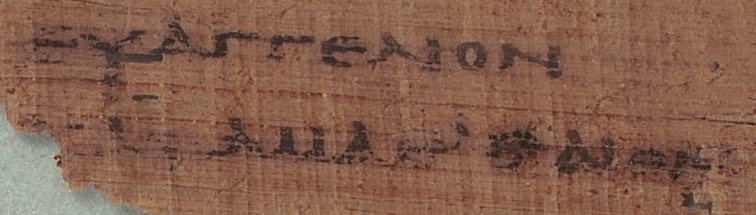
Papyrus 𝔓^{4}, fragment of a flyleaf with the title of the Gospel of Matthew, ευαγγελιον κ̣ατ̣α μαθ᾽θαιον, euangelion kata Maththaion. Dated to late 2nd or early 3rd century, it is the earliest manuscript title for Matthew.

Papias of Hierapolis (c. 60–130 AD), who had met the Elder and the daughters of Philip the Evangelist, attributed the gospel to Matthew, an apostle and companion of Jesus. Most scholars view it as an anonymous composition, as was common for ancient biographies and Jewish historiography such as those of Plutarch and Suetonius which were originally anonymous, though the traditional authorship "still has its defenders." It is possible that this gospel incorporates a prior source by Matthew. In any case, it was attributed to Matthew very early and was highly popular in the early church. Most contemporary scholars argue that the Gospel of John, which is traditionally attributed to the Beloved Disciple, knew and used the Synoptic Gospels, and a growing number of scholars argue that the Gospel of Luke used Matthew as well. Most scholars agree from both external attributions and the familiarity with the Hebrew language, the Torah, and the technical legal aspects of scripture being debated in his time, that the author was a Jew who stood on the margin between traditional and non-traditional Jewish values. (Note: This view is based on three arguments: (a) the setting reflects the final separation of Church and Synagogue, about 85 AD; (b) it reflects the capture of Jerusalem and destruction of the Temple by the Romans in 70 AD; (c) it uses Mark, usually dated around 70 AD, as a source. (See R. T. France (2007), The Gospel of Matthew, p. 18.) France himself is not convinced by the majority—see his Commentary, pp. 18–19. Allison adds that "Ignatius of Antioch, the Didache, and Papias—all from the first part of the second century—show knowledge of Matthew, which accordingly must have been composed before 100 CE. (See e.g. Ign., Smyrn. 1; Did. 8.2.)" See Dale Allison, "Matthew" in Muddiman and Barton's The Gospels (Oxford Bible Commentary), Oxford 2010, p. 27.) Other scholars, such as N. T. Wright and John Wenham, argue that it is problematic to date this gospel to the late first century, maintaining that it was composed in the 40s–50s CE. (Note: Wenham holds that later dates are based on (a) a belief that the apocalyptic passages in the Synoptics refer to past events rather than future; and (b) a misreading of Irenaeus as claiming that Matthew wrote after Peter and Paul preached in Rome.) According to Bas van Os, it was likely written within the lifetime of various eyewitnesses that include Jesus's own family through the end of the first century;^{]} Markus Bockmuehi finds this structure of lifetime memory in various early Christian traditions.

The Gospel of Mark is the first gospel to be composed and was used by the others. The author of Matthew emphasizes Jesus's place in the Jewish tradition and includes details not found in Mark. Luke and Matthew treat their sources more conservatively than other ancient historians like Diodorus Siculus, though the parallels and variations of the Synoptics are typical of ancient historical biographies.

This does not necessarily show a linear approach of continual development and addition alone, as some of the words of Paul the Apostle are more similar to Matthew's details. Matthew could have depended on Mark through oral tradition, or used memorisation rather than simply copying. Alan Kirk praises Matthew for his "scribal memory competence" and "high esteem for and careful handling of both Mark and Q", which makes dubious the claims that the latter two works are significantly different in terms of theology or historical reliability.

Matthew has 600 verses in common with Mark, which is a book of only 661 verses. There are approximately 220 verses shared by Matthew and Luke but not found in Mark. While the Two-source hypothesis considers this to be drawn from a hypothetical Q source, a growing number of scholars support alternative hypotheses, such as the Farrer hypothesis and the Matthean Posteriority hypothesis, which argue for Luke's direct usage of Matthew and Matthew's dependence on Luke, respectively and dispense with Q, with the M Source being rejected by modern scholarship. Michael Goulder argued that non-Markan material in Matthew were mostly authorial creations, but modern advocates of the Farrer hypothesis have abandoned this idea. The author also had the Greek scriptures at his disposal, both as book-scrolls (Greek translations of Isaiah, the Psalms etc.), "testimony collections", and the oral stories of his community. Many of the quotations of the scriptures in Matthew are more closely matched with the Masoretic, leading many scholars to believe that the author could understand Hebrew.

=== Setting ===
Most scholars view the gospel of Matthew as a work of the second generation of Christians, though it draws on the memory of the first generation of Jesus's disciples. For these early Christians the defining event was the destruction of Jerusalem and the Temple by the Romans in 70 AD in the course of the First Jewish–Roman War (66–73 AD); from this point on, what had begun with Jesus of Nazareth as a Jewish messianic movement became an increasingly gentile phenomenon which would evolve in time into a separate religion. Other scholars hold that the historical Jesus had already predicted that the Jerusalem Temple would be destroyed. The author appears to have written for a community of Greek-speaking Jewish Christians located probably in Syria; Antioch, the largest city in Roman Syria and the third largest city in the empire, is often proposed. Alternatively, towns in Galilee such as Sepphoris or Tiberias, or adjacent regions such as Transjordan, could also fit.

The community to which Matthew belonged, like many 1st-century Christians, was still part of the larger Jewish community. The relationship of Matthew to this wider world of Judaism remains a subject of study and contention, the principal question being to what extent, if any, Matthew's community had cut itself off from its Jewish roots. It is evident from the gospel that there was conflict between Matthew's group and other Jewish groups, and it is generally agreed that the root of the conflict was the Matthew community's belief in Jesus as the Messiah and authoritative interpreter of the law, as one risen from the dead and uniquely endowed with divine authority.

The divinity of Jesus was a major issue for the Matthean community, the crucial element separating the early Christians from their Jewish neighbors; while Mark begins with Jesus's baptism and temptations, Matthew goes back to Jesus's origins, showing him as the Son of God from his birth, the supposed fulfillment of messianic prophecies of the Old Testament. The title Son of David, used exclusively in relation to miracles, identifies Jesus as the healing and miracle-working Messiah sent to Israel alone; the reason for disregarding the gentiles and Samaritans is not due to prejudice but the immediate needs of God’s people: Israel. As Son of Man he will return to judge the world, an expectation which his disciples recognize but of which his enemies are unaware. As Son of God, God is revealing himself through his son, and Jesus proving his sonship through his obedience and example.

Unlike Mark, Matthew never bothers to explain Jewish customs, since his intended audience was a Jewish one; unlike Luke, who traces Jesus's ancestry back to Adam, father of the human race, he traces it only to Abraham, father of the Jews. Writing from within a Jewish-Christian community growing distant from other Jews and becoming increasingly gentile in its membership and outlook, Matthew put down in his gospel his vision "of an assembly or church in which both Jew and Gentile would flourish together".

== Structure and content ==
=== Structure: narrative and discourses ===
Matthew alternates five blocks of narrative with five of discourse, marking each off with the phrase "When Jesus had finished". Some scholars see in this a deliberate plan to create a parallel to the first five books of the Old Testament; others see a three-part structure based around the idea of Jesus as Messiah, a set of weekly readings spread out over the year, or no plan at all. Davies and Allison, in their widely used commentary, draw attention to the use of "triads" (the gospel groups things in threes), and R. T. France, in another influential commentary, notes the geographic movement from Galilee to Jerusalem and back, with the post-resurrection appearances in Galilee as the culmination of the whole story. An 'eleven' sectioned structure is also recognized, where the sections alternate between narrative and teachings in a 1,2,3,4,5,C,5',4',3',2',1' arrangement (and the parables of the Kingdom take central place). In this reading, the sections comprise 'fourteens' of units of text, where in the first and last units of the gospel the writer provides these numbers, 'threes', 'fourteens' and 'eleven', as a reading check.

=== Prologue: genealogy, Nativity and infancy (Matthew 1–2) ===
The Gospel of Matthew begins with the words "The Book of Genealogy [in Greek, 'Genesis'] of Jesus Christ", deliberately echoing the words of Genesis 2:4 in the Septuagint. (Note: France, p. 26 note 1, and p. 28: "The first two words of Matthew's gospel are literally "book of genesis".) The genealogy tells of Jesus's descent from Abraham and King David and the miraculous events surrounding his virgin birth, (Note: France, p. 28 note 7: "All MSS and versions agree in making it explicit that Joseph was not Jesus' father, with the one exception of sys, which reads "Joseph, to whom was betrothed Mary the virgin, begot Jesus.") and the infancy narrative tells of the massacre of the innocents, the flight into Egypt, and eventual journey to Nazareth.

=== First narrative and Sermon on the Mount (Matthew 3:1–8:1) ===
Following the genealogy and nativity of Jesus, the first narrative section begins. John the Baptist baptizes Jesus, and the Holy Spirit descends upon him. Jesus prays in the wilderness for forty days and is tempted by Satan. His early ministry in Galilee meets with much success, and leads to the Sermon on the Mount, the first of the discourses. The sermon presents the ethics of the kingdom of God, introduced by the Beatitudes ("Blessed are..."). It concludes with a reminder that the response to the kingdom will have eternal consequences, and the crowd's amazed response leads into the next narrative block.

=== Second narrative and discourse (Matthew 8:2–11:1) ===
From the authoritative words of Jesus, the gospel turns to three sets of three miracles interwoven with two sets of two discipleship stories (the second narrative), followed by a discourse on mission and suffering. Jesus commissions the Twelve Disciples and sends them to preach to the Jews, perform miracles, and prophesy the coming of the Kingdom, commanding them to travel without staff or sandals.

=== Third narrative and discourse (Matthew 11:2–13:53) ===
Opposition to Jesus comes to a head with an accusation by the Pharisees that his deeds are done through Satan. Jesus in turn accuses his opponents of blaspheming the Holy Spirit. The discourse is a set of parables emphasizing the sovereignty of God, and concluding with a challenge to the disciples to understand the teachings as scribes of the Kingdom of Heaven. (Matthew avoids using the holy word God in the expression "Kingdom of God"; instead he prefers the term "Kingdom of Heaven", reflecting the Jewish tradition of not speaking the name of God).

=== Fourth narrative and discourse (Matthew 13:54–19:1) ===
The fourth narrative section reveals that the increasing opposition to Jesus will result in his crucifixion in Jerusalem, and that his disciples must therefore prepare for his absence. The instructions for the post-crucifixion church emphasize responsibility and humility. This section contains the two feedings of the multitude (Matthew 14:13–21 and 15:32–39) along with the narrative in which Simon, newly renamed Peter (Πέτρος, Petros, 'stone'), calls Jesus "the Christ, the son of the living God", and Jesus states that on this "bedrock" (πέτρα, petra) he will build his church (Matthew 16:13–19).

=== Fifth narrative and discourse (Matthew 19:2–26:1) ===
Jesus travels toward Jerusalem, and the opposition intensifies: he is tested by the Pharisees as soon as he begins to move toward the city, and when he arrives he is soon in conflict with the Temple's traders and religious leaders. He teaches in the Temple, debating with the chief priests and religious leaders and speaking in parables about the Kingdom of God and the failings of the chief priests and the Pharisees. The Herodian caucus also becomes involved in a scheme to entangle Jesus, but Jesus's careful response to their enquiry, "Render therefore to Caesar the things that are Caesar's, and to God the things that are God's", leaves them marveling at his words.

The disciples ask about the future, and in his final discourse Jesus speaks of the coming end, predicting false Messiahs, earthquakes, and persecutions before all the prophecies are fulfilled. The disciples must steel themselves for ministry to all the nations. At the end of the discourse, Matthew notes that Jesus has finished all his words, and attention turns to the crucifixion.

=== Conclusion: Passion, Resurrection and Great Commission (Matthew 26:2–28:20) ===
The events of Jesus's last week occupy a third of the content of all four gospels. Jesus enters Jerusalem in triumph and drives the money changers from the Temple, holds a Last Supper, prays to be spared the coming agony (but concludes "if this cup may not pass away from me, except I drink it, thy will be done"), and is betrayed. He is tried by the Sanhedrin and before Pontius Pilate, and Pilate washes his hands to indicate that he does not assume responsibility. Jesus is crucified as king of the Jews, mocked by all. On his death there is an earthquake, the veil of the Temple is rent, and saints rise from their tombs. Mary Magdalene and another Mary discover the empty tomb, guarded by an angel, and Jesus himself tells them to tell the disciples to meet him in Galilee.

After the resurrection the remaining disciples return to Galilee, where Jesus tells them that he has been given "all authority in heaven and on Earth." He gives the Great Commission: "Therefore go and make disciples of all the nations, baptizing them in the name of the Father and of the Son and of the Holy Spirit, teaching them to obey everything that I have commanded you". Jesus will be with them "to the very end of the age".

== Theology ==
=== Christology ===
Christology is the theological doctrine of Christ, "the affirmations and definitions of Christ's humanity and deity". There are a variety of Christologies in the New Testament, albeit with a single centre—Jesus is the figure in whom God has acted for the salvation of humankind.

Recent scholarship focuses on explaining the gospels' relationship in terms of ancient compositional practices and comparisons with other ancient historical biographers over older redaction-critical concerns. According to Christopher Tuckett, Matthew has taken key Christological texts from Mark, but has sometimes changed the stories found in Mark, giving evidence of his own concerns. James Barker argues that older scholarship has exaggerated the importance of the evangelists’ theological aims, with ancient rhetoric explaining many differences in the gospels instead. The title Son of David identifies Jesus as the healing and miracle-working Messiah of Israel (it is used exclusively in relation to miracles), and the Jewish messiah is sent to Israel alone. As Son of Man he will return to judge the world, a fact his disciples recognize but of which his enemies are unaware. As Son of God he is named Immanuel ('God with us'), God revealing himself through his son, and Jesus proving his sonship through his obedience and example.

=== Relationship with the Jews ===
Matthew's prime concern was that the Jewish tradition should not be lost in a church that was increasingly becoming gentile. This concern lies behind the frequent citations of Jewish scripture, the evocation of Jesus as the new Moses along with other events from Jewish history, and the concern to present Jesus as fulfilling, not destroying, the Law. Matthew must have been aware of the tendency to distort Paul's teaching of the law no longer having power over the New Testament Christian into antinomianism, and addressed Christ's fulfilling of what the Israelites expected from the "Law and the Prophets" in an eschatological sense, in that he was all that the Old Testament had predicted in the Messiah.

The concept of gospel ‘communities’ has faced increasing criticism as interpreters retire the concept. It tells how Israel's Messiah, rejected and executed in Israel, pronounces judgment on Israel and its leaders and becomes the salvation of the gentiles. Prior to the crucifixion of Jesus, the Jews are referred to as Israelites—the honorific title of God's chosen people. After it, they are called Ioudaios (Jews), a sign that—due to their rejection of the Christ—the "Kingdom of Heaven" has been taken away from them and given instead to the church. Regardless of the gentile mission and subsequent Jewish opposition, Matthew maintains the ethnic particularism of the Hebrew Bible and the central role of Israel within God’s relationship with mankind.

== Comparison with other writings ==
=== Christological development ===
The divinity of Jesus was a major issue for the community of Matthew, the crucial element marking them from their Jewish neighbors. Early understandings of this nature grew as the gospels were being written. Before the gospels, that understanding was focused on the revelation of Jesus as God in his resurrection, but the gospels reflect a broadened focus extended backwards in time.

=== Mark ===
Matthew used Mark more conservatively than was typical of historians of antiquity. Mark Goodacre writes that Matthew does not “vanquish or supplant” Mark but understands his predecessor correctly in key ways. Michael Barber argues that Matthew provides a plausible portrayal of Jesus, while Dale Allison finds Matthean interpretation and redaction of Mark as a path instead of an obscurement of the Historical Jesus. Matthew Larsen contended that Matthew represented a completion of Mark’s unfinished draft, while Foster describes Matthew as a new and innovative work that while indebted to Mark, maintains creative and theological distinctiveness. Matthew stresses Jesus's teachings as much as his acts, and makes subtle changes in order to stress his divine nature: for example, Mark's "young man" who appears at Jesus's tomb becomes "a radiant angel" in Matthew. The miracle stories in Mark do not demonstrate the divinity of Jesus, but rather confirm his status as an emissary of God (which was Mark's understanding of the Messiah).

=== Chronology ===
While Matthew, Mark and Luke feature one trip to Jerusalem at the end of Jesus’ ministry, where there is an incident in the Temple, climaxing with the crucifixion on the day of the Passover holiday, John puts the Temple incident early in Jesus's ministry, has several trips to Jerusalem, and puts the crucifixion before the Passover, on the day when the lambs for the Passover meal were being sacrificed. Dale Allison is inclined to favor John’s chronology, though with caution, while Sanders defends the shorter Synoptic timeline. However, there are also verses such as Mark 14:49 and Matthew 23:37 that are often viewed as hints of a longer ministry. Ancient writing practices involved such chronological displacement and changes, with even reliable biographers including Plutarch displaying them.

=== Canonical positioning ===
The early patristic scholars regarded Matthew as the earliest of the gospels and placed it first in the canon, and the early Church mostly quoted from Matthew, secondarily from John, and only distantly from Mark.

== Reception ==
Many scholars, notably Mark Goodacre, argue for John’s knowledge of Matthew and the other Synoptics. The Gospel of Matthew was known to Ignatius of Antioch and the Didache. Papias, Polycarp, the Epistle of Barnabas, and Justin Martyr all demonstrate familiarity with and usage of Matthew.

== See also ==
- Authorship of the Bible
- Gospel of the Ebionites
- Gospel of the Hebrews
- Gospel of the Nazarenes
- Hebrew Gospel hypothesis
- The Visual Bible: Matthew
- Il vangelo secondo Matteo, a film by Pier Paolo Pasolini
- Jewish–Christian gospels
- List of omitted Bible verses
- List of Gospels
- Sermon on the Mount
- St Matthew Passion – an oratorio by J. S. Bach
- Textual variants in the Gospel of Matthew
- Shem Tob's Hebrew Gospel of Matthew

== Notes ==
Gospel of Matthew Synoptic Gospel
Preceded by Old Testament; Malachi; Minor prophets	New Testament; Books of the Bible	Succeeded by Gospel of Mark
