= Averil Cameron =

British historian of late antiquity (1940–2026)

Dame Averil Cameron DBE FSA FRHistS FBA
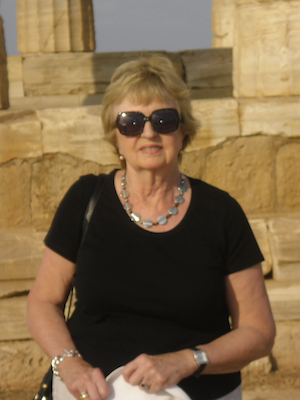
- Cameron in 2012
- Born: Averil Millicent Sutton; 8 February 1940; Leek, Staffordshire, England
- Died: 7 April 2026 (aged 86)
- Other name: A. M. Cameron
- Spouse: Alan Cameron (m. 1962; div. 1980)
- Children: 2

Academic background
- Education: Somerville College, Oxford; King's College, London
- Thesis: The Histories of Agathias (1966)

Academic work
- Discipline: History
- Sub-discipline: Byzantine History; Late antiquity
- Institutions: King's College, London; Keble College, Oxford

Dame Averil Millicent Cameron DBE FSA FRHistS FBA (née Sutton; 8 February 1940 – 7 April 2026), often cited as A. M. Cameron, was a British historian. She wrote on Late Antiquity, Classics, and Byzantine Studies. She was Professor of Late Antique and Byzantine History at King's College London and subsequently Warden of Keble College, Oxford, between 1994 and 2010.

== Early life and education ==
Cameron was born in Leek, Staffordshire, on 8 February 1940. She was the only child of working-class parents, Tom Roy Sutton and Millicent (née Drew) Sutton. She read literae humaniores at Somerville College, Oxford, where she was awarded the Edwards Scholarship in 1960 and the Rosa Hovey Scholarship in 1962. Cameron completed her doctoral studies on the Byzantine historian and poet Agathias. She began her PhD degree at Glasgow University before moving to King's College London to complete it under the supervision of Arnaldo Momigliano, submitting in 1966. Her thesis was examined by Momigliano and Peter Brown.

== Career ==
From 1965 to 1994, Cameron taught at King's College, London. She began as an Assistant Lecturer, before being promoted to Lecturer in 1968 and to Reader in Ancient History in 1970. She was Professor of Ancient History from 1978 to 1989, and Professor of Late Antique and Byzantine Studies from 1989 to 1994. She was Founding Director of the Centre for Hellenic Studies at KCL, serving from 1989 to 1994. Cameron was not recognised as a Byzantine specialist at Kings; she was described firmly as a classicist by Donald Nicol, who dismissed her as an attractive bluestocking. ^{[p. 128]}

In 1994 she was elected Warden of Keble College, Oxford, where she served as Chair of the Conference of Colleges and as Pro-Vice-Chancellor, Chair of Committees relating to the Bodleian Art, Archaeology and Ancient World Library (then the Sackler Library), to the St Cross Building, to Honorary Degrees, Select Preachers, to the Bampton Lectures and to the Wainwright Fund, and was a member of the committee on conflict of interest.

Cameron was Editor of the Journal of Roman Studies from 1985 to 1990 and served as Chair of a number of academic institutions, including the Oxford Centre for Byzantine Research and the Institute of Classical Studies Advisory Council. She also chaired the project on the Prosopography of the Byzantine World at King's College London. Cameron was only the second woman, after Emily Vermeule, to hold the Jane K. Sather Professorship of Classical Literature (1985–86), an endowed chair for the study of classics at the University of California, Berkeley. Cameron met the historian Elizabeth A. Clark in the early 1980s and they became very good friends. Clark was able to engineer a generous offer of employment at Duke, but Cameron was unable to accept the position. ^{[p. 122]}

She was Vice-Chair and then Chair of the Cathedrals Fabric Commission for England and chaired the Review of the Royal Peculiars (1999, Report published 2001).

Cameron also acted as the President of academic societies including: the Ecclesiastical History Society (2005–2006), the Council for British Research in the Levant, and the International Federation of Associations of Classical Studies (2009–2014). In 2018, she became President of the Society for the Promotion of Byzantine Studies (2018–2023), an organisation she founded with Anthony Bryer in 1983.

=== Work ===
Cameron is credited with contributing to a reorientation in modern scholarship on the Byzantine Empire. According to The Daily Telegraph, she was "a leading voice in a generation of scholars who finally salvaged the study of the Eastern Roman empire from the prejudices of the Enlightenment", which had historically shaped accounts of the Byzantines as intellectually stagnant and culturally inferior. In contrast, Cameron praised the intellectual vitality and plurality of Byzantine society, stressing its capacity for debate, adaptation, and innovation. She rejected declinist interpretations that framed the empire in terms of inertia or decay; she viewed Byzantine culture as a "mass of experimentation".

Cameron's early articles explored early Byzantine and mediaeval writers including Agathias, Corippus, Procopius, and Gregory of Tours from literary and historical perspectives. Her early monographs, Agathias (1970) and Procopius and the Sixth Century (1985) were accompanied by a number of influential edited collections, including Images of Women in Antiquity, edited jointly with Amélie Kuhrt (1983), and History as Text (1989). Her work Christianity and the Rhetoric of Empire: The Development of Christian Discourse (1990) originated as the Sather Classical Lectures at Berkeley. With this work Cameron sparked a scholarly conversation about "the power of discourse in society" in later antiquity, seeking to understand "how Christianity was able to develop a totalizing discourse" (the phrase itself is borrowed from the work of Michel Foucault).

Cameron argued that early Christianity did not represent a break with classical antiquity, but instead repurposed Greco-Roman rhetorical and literary traditions, including forms such as philosophical dialogue and panegyric. In Cameron's view, Christian intellectual culture developed through engagement with established classical modes of expression. She also suggested that "Orthodoxy in Byzantium was always vaunted but also always contested." She suggested that religious authority in the Byzantine world was not monolithic.

Historian of Late Antiquity, Peter Brown, described her work as helping to move scholarship away, "firmly and with alert intelligence", from "debased images of Byzantium". Historian Peter Thonemann also praised her scholarship, stating that "no one has written about the history and culture of Byzantium with such luminous intelligence" as she did.

Cameron's scholarship encompassed material culture, art history, and the history of religion as well as text-based approaches to the past. She was invited to provide historical analysis for archaeological excavations in Carthage in the early 1980s, and wrote a substantial report on Roman north Africa, published within the University of Michigan's excavation reports. In Carthage, Cameron met the archaeologist Edith Wightman from McMaster University and they became good friends.

== Personal life and death ==
From 1962 to 1980, she was married to Alan Cameron, a classical scholar. Together they had a son and a daughter.

Cameron died on 7 April 2026, at the age of 86.

== Honours ==
Cameron held honorary degrees from the Universities of Warwick, St Andrews, Aberdeen, Lund, London, and Queen's University Belfast, as well as a DLitt. from Oxford.

She was appointed a Commander of the Order of the British Empire (CBE) in the 1999 Birthday Honours, and was promoted to Dame Commander of the Order of the British Empire (DBE) in the 2006 New Year Honours, in both cases for services to Classical Scholarship.

Cameron was a Fellow of the Society of Antiquaries of London (FSA), the British Academy (FBA), the Ecclesiastical History Society, the Institute of Classical Studies, London King's College, London, and the Royal Historical Society (FRHistS).

In 2007, a Festschrift edited by Hagit Amirav and Bas ter Haar Romeny, From Rome to Constantinople: Studies in Honour of Averil Cameron (Leuven: Peeters), was published in Cameron's honour. In 2020, Cameron was awarded the British Academy Kenyon Medal for her lifetime contribution to Byzantine Studies. The medal was awarded for the first time in 1957. Cameron was the second woman to receive the award, after Joyce Reynolds (2017).

== Selected bibliography ==
=== Books and edited volumes ===
- Agathias (Clarendon Press 1970), ISBN 0-19-814352-4
- Flavius Cresconius Corippus, In laudem Iustini Augusti minoris libri IV, edited with translation and commentary (London: Athlone Press, 1976)
- Images of Women in Antiquity, ed. with Amélie Kuhrt (London: Duckworth, 1983, rev. 1993),
- Procopius and the Sixth Century (Duckworth 1985), ISBN 0-7156-1510-7
- History as Text, ed. (London: Duckworth, 1989)
- The Greek Renaissance in the Roman Empire, ed. with Susan Walker (London: 1989) ISBN 9780900587597
- Christianity and the Rhetoric of Empire: The Development of Christian Discourse (University of California Press 1991), ISBN 0-520-07160-3
- The Byzantine and Early Islamic Near East I: Problems in the Literary Sources, ed. with Lawrence I. Conrad (Princeton: Darwin Press, 1992)
- The Later Roman Empire, AD 284–430 (Fontana 1993), ISBN 0-00-686172-5
- The Byzantine and Early Islamic Near East II: Land Use and Settlement Patterns, ed. with G.R.D. King (Princeton: Darwin Press, 1994; 2021 ISBN 9783959940863)
- The Byzantine and Early Islamic Near East III: States, Resources and Armies, ed. (Princeton: Darwin Press, 1995; 2021 ISBN 9783959940887)
- The Mediterranean World in Late Antiquity, AD 395–700 (London: Routledge 1993), ISBN 0-415-01420-4; rev/ and expanded ed. (London: Routledge, 2012)
- Images of Women in Antiquity (rev. ed., Routledge 1993), ISBN 0-415-09095-4 (ed. with Amélie Kuhrt)
- Eusebius, Life of Constantine, trans. and commentary, with S.G. Hall (Oxford: Clarendon Press, 1999)
- Fifty Years of Prosopography, ed., Publications of the British Academy (Oxford: Oxford University Press, 2003)
- The Cambridge Ancient History
  - Vol. 12: The Crisis of Empire, AD 193–337 (Cambridge University Press 2005), ISBN 0-521-30199-8 (2nd ed., ed. with Alan K. Bowman and Peter Garnsey)
  - Vol. 13: The Late Empire, AD 337–425 (Cambridge University Press 1998), ISBN 0-521-30200-5 (ed. with Peter Garnsey)
  - Vol. 14: Late Antiquity: Empires and Successors, AD 425–600 (Cambridge University Press 2000), ISBN 0-521-32591-9 (ed. with Bryan Ward-Perkins and Michael Whitby)
- Doctrine and Debate in Eastern Christianity, 300–1500, ed. with Robert Hoyland (Farnham: Ashgate, 2011) ISBN 9781409400349
- Late Antiquity on the Eve of Islam, The Formation of the Islamic World, ed. (Farnham: Ashgate, 2013) ISBN 9781409400707
- The Byzantines (Oxford: Blackwell 2006), ISBN 0-631-20262-5
- Dialoguing in Late Antiquity (Cambridge, MA:: Ashgate Harvard University Press, 2014) ISBN 9780674428355
- Byzantine Matters (Princeton: Princeton University Press, 2014) ISBN 9780691196855
- Arguing it Out: Discussion in Twelfth-Century Byzantium (Central European University Press, 2016) ISBN 9789633861110
- Dialogues and Debates from Late Antiquity to Late Byzantium, ed. with Niels Gaul (Milton Park: Routledge, 2017) ISBN 9781472489357
- Byzantine Christianity: A Very Brief History (London: SPCK, 2017) ISBN 9780281076130
- From the Later Roman Empire to Late Antiquity and Beyond (London: Routledge, 2023) ISBN 9781032133447
- Procopius of Caesarea: The Persian Wars: Translation, with Introduction and Notes (Cambridge University Press, 2023) ISBN 9781107165700
- Transitions: A Historian's Memoir (Brepols, 2024) ISBN 9782503612980

=== Journal articles ===
Articles include 'The Cost of Orthodoxy', Church History and Religious Culture, vol. 93 (2013) 339–61, and 'Early Christianity and the discourse of female desire', repr. from Women in Ancient Societies, ed. L. J. Archer, S. Fischler and M. Wyke (Basingstoke: Macmillan, 1994), 152–68, with an afterword, in The Religious History of the Roman Empire. Pagans, Jews and Christians, ed. J.A. North and S.R.F. Price (Oxford readings in Classical Studies, Oxford: Oxford University Press, 2011), 505–30, and 'Byzantium and the limits of Orthodoxy', Raleigh Lecture on History, (Proceedings of the British Academy 154 2008), 139–52, and the autobiographical 'An Accidental Scholar', Catholic Historical Review 107(1), 2021, pp 1–27.

Academic offices
Preceded by George Barclay Richardson	Warden of Keble College, Oxford; 1994–2010	Succeeded by Sir Jonathan Phillips
Professional and academic associations
Preceded by Eamon Duffy	President of the Ecclesiastical History Society; 2005–2006	Succeeded by David W. Bebbington
