= Jonathan Phillips (civil servant) =

British civil servant

Sir Jonathan Phillips KCB

Warden of Keble College, Oxford
- In office 2010–2022
- Preceded by: Dame Averil Cameron
- Succeeded by: Sir Michael Jacobs

Personal details
- Born: 21 May 1952 (age 74)

Sir Jonathan Phillips (b. 21 May 1952), is a retired British civil servant who served as Warden of Keble College, Oxford from 2010 to 2022.

Phillips was appointed as Permanent Secretary of the Northern Ireland Office in 2005 to replace Sir Joseph Pilling), having been Director-General, Political since 2002. Just before he retired in 2010, the Northern Ireland Office transferred a large portion of its duties to the Northern Ireland Executive as part of devolution, and the job of Accounting Officer transferred to the Director-General, Political, Hillary Jackson. He was appointed Knight Commander of the Order of the Bath (KCB) in the 2009 New Year Honours.

He lives with his wife, Amanda, and has two sons, one of whom was elected a Fellow by examination of All Souls' College, Oxford in 2005.

Government offices
Unknown	Director-General, Political, Northern Ireland Office; 2002–2005	Succeeded by Robert Hannigan
Preceded by Sir Joseph Pilling	Permanent Secretary, Northern Ireland Office; 2005–2010	Succeeded by Hillary Jackson as Director-General
Academic offices
Preceded by Averil Cameron	Warden of Keble College, Oxford; 2010–2022	Succeeded by Michael Jacobs
