= Farrer hypothesis =

Hypothesis in biblical criticism

- L/M hypothesis, Farrer–Goulder hypothesis, Farrer–Goulder–Goodacre hypothesis

Theory Information
- Order: Marcan Priority; Matt; Luke
- Additional Sources: No additional sources

Gospels' Sources
- Matthew: Mark
- Luke: Matt, Mark

Theory History
- Originator: Austin Farrer
- Originating Work: On Dispensing with Q
- Origination Date: 1955
- Proponents: Michael Goulder; Mark Goodacre
- Opponents: B. H. Streeter

The Farrer hypothesis (also called the L/M hypothesis, the Farrer–Goulder hypothesis and the Farrer–Goulder–Goodacre hypothesis) is a possible solution to the synoptic problem. The theory is that the Gospel of Mark was written first, followed by the Gospel of Matthew and then by the Gospel of Luke, with Matthew and Luke using the earlier gospel(s) as sources.

It has mainly been advocated by English biblical scholars, and is growing in support within scholarship. It is named for Austin Farrer, who wrote On Dispensing With Q in 1955, but it has been picked up by other scholars including Michael Goulder and Mark Goodacre.

== Overview ==
The Farrer theory has the advantage of simplicity, as there is no need for hypothetical sources. Instead, advocates of the Farrer theory argue the Gospel of Mark was used as source material by the author of Matthew. Lastly, Luke used both of the previous gospels as sources for his Gospel. The hypothesis is enjoying growing popularity in scholarship. (Note: Runesson and Mitternacht: “Today, Mark Goodacre is the most vocal proponent of this theory, which is experiencing growing popularity among scholars.”)

Farrer set out his argument in an essay "On dispensing with Q". He says that the two-source hypothesis, as set out by B. H. Streeter thirty years earlier, "wholly depends on the incredibility [i.e., unbelievability] of St Luke having read St Matthew's book", since otherwise the natural assumption would be that one was dependent on the other, rather than that they were both dependent on a further source.

This assumption could be displaced by, for example, identifying material appearing in both Matthew and Luke that was very different from either of them, which, when extracted, appears to be a work in its own right, with a beginning, middle and end. Neither of these factors are found in Q, as reconstructed by scholars. He also says (writing before the publication of the Gospel of Thomas) that "we have no reason to believe that documents of the Q type were plentiful", which would have made the hypothesis that Matthew and Luke drew on one more likely.

Nor is it obvious, Farrer says, that a book like Q was likely to be produced as a written manual of the teaching of Christ, since the reconstruction of it requires it to also have significant narrative elements interspersed with the teaching, and to have an interest in symbolism from the Old Testament.

== Arguments for and against ==
=== Arguments for ===
In his 1955 paper On Dispensing with Q, Austin Farrer made the case that if Luke had been acquainted with the gospel of Matthew, there would be no need to postulate a lost Q gospel. Farrer's case rested on the following points:

- The Q hypothesis was formed to answer the question of where Matthew and Luke got their common material if they did not know of each other's gospels. But if Luke had read Matthew, the question that Q answers does not arise.
- We have no evidence from early Christian writings that anything like Q ever existed.
- When scholars have attempted to reconstruct Q from the common elements of Matthew and Luke, the result does not look like a gospel.
  - Although many scholars originally thought of Q as a sayings gospel, a collection of teachings with no narrative content, all alleged reconstructions of Q from the common parts of Matthew and Luke include narrative about John the Baptist, Jesus' baptism and temptation in the wilderness, and his healing of a centurion's servant.
  - However, they don't include an account of Jesus' death and resurrection.
  - But from the earliest Christian writings, we see a strong emphasis on precisely the element that a putative Q omits, Jesus' death and resurrection.
- Some scholars have attempted to overcome problems with Q reconstructions by claiming we cannot know the actual contents of the Q gospel. However, postulating Luke's acquaintance with the gospel of Matthew overcomes these same problems and gives the source for the common material.

The most notable argument for the Farrer hypothesis is that there are many passages where the text of Matthew and Luke agree in making small changes to that of Mark (what is called the double tradition). This would follow naturally if Luke was using Matthew and Mark, but is hard to explain if he is using Mark and Q. Streeter divides these into six groups and finds separate hypotheses for each.

Farrer says of Streeter's grouping that "[h]is argument finds its strength in the fewness of the instances for which any one hypothesis needs to be invoked; but the opposing counsel will unkindly point out that the diminution of the instances for each hypothesis is in exact proportion to the multiplication of the hypotheses themselves. One cannot say that Dr. Streeter's plea is incapable of being sustained, but one must concede that it is a plea against apparent evidence".

Goodacre puts forth an additional argument from fatigue, meaning cases where a derivative passage begins to make changes to its source but fails to sustain them and lapses back into the original version. For example, the parable of the talents is more coherent in Matthew, but less so in Luke, who attempted to increase the number of servants from three to ten. The several instances where this is observed point to Luke using Matthew rather than contrariwise.

=== Streeter's arguments against and Farrer's responses ===
Five arguments are given by Streeter for the impossibility of Luke relying on Matthew.

1. The first is that he would not have omitted some of the Matthean texts that he did because they are so striking. Farrer replies that they were omitted because they do not conform to the 'edifice' that Luke is building.
2. The second is that Luke sometimes preserves a more primitive version of a text that is also in Matthew. Farrer replies that this depends on being able to identify the more primitive text; for example, "Blessed are the poor in spirit" suits Matthew's theology, but it would be natural for Luke to drop the "in spirit" to fit his concern with the poor.
3. The third is that Luke follows Mark's order but does not do the same with Matthew. Farrer asks, in reply, why he should: "Is it surprising that he should lay his plan on Marcan foundations, and quarry St. Matthew for materials to build up his house?"
4. The fourth is that Luke uses the material less well than Matthew. Farrer replies that this may be so, but he would not be the first adapter to have produced a less skilful result, the only issue was whether it would suit Luke's message better to have the material arranged in this way.
5. The final argument is that Luke does not use the material within the same Marcan paragraphs as Matthew. Farrer points out that he takes them out of a Marcan context and reproduces them elsewhere. In chapters 10–18, Luke reassembles the teaching material in a way which makes the points that he wants to make, often by pairing sayings that have not been paired together before. This may have been to produce a Christian Deuteronomy, just as it was argued that Matthew's gospel was in the form of a Christian Pentateuch.

== See also ==
- Markan priority
- Wilke hypothesis
- Griesbach hypothesis
- Four-document hypothesis
- Gospel of Marcion
