= Geddes MacGregor =

Author, scholar, and priest (1909–1998)

John Geddes MacGregor
- Born: 13 November 1909; Glasgow, Scotland
- Died: 9 October 1998 (aged 88); Los Angeles
- Citizenship: United States (naturalized in 1957)
- Occupation: Professor of philosophy
- Spouse: Elizabeth Sutherland McAllister (m. 1941; died 1994)
- Children: 2

Academic background
- Education: University of Edinburgh (New College); University of Oxford (Queen's College)
- Doctoral advisor: Austin Farrer

John Geddes MacGregor (1909–1998) was an author, scholar of philosophy, educator, and an ordained Episcopal priest.

== Early life and education ==
MacGregor was born in Glasgow, Scotland on 13 November 1909, and his early life was spent in Edinburgh, Dundee, and in continental Europe.

MacGregor received a Bachelor of Divinity degree from the University of Edinburgh (BD, 1939). He later received a Bachelor of Laws from University of Edinburgh, New College (LLB, 1943), and a Doctor of Philosophy from the University of Oxford (DPhil, 1945, supervised by Austin Farrer). For published work, he received a Doctorat ès lettres from the University of Paris (Dr ès l, 1951, Summa Cum Laude), and a Doctor of Divinity from University of Oxford (DD, 1959). In 1978 he received an honorary Doctor of Humane Letters (LHD) degree from Hebrew Union College.

== Religion ==
MacGregor was raised Presbyterian, but as a young man in Edinburgh he converted to Roman Catholicism under the influence of Canon John Gray of Saint Peter's, Morningside. Later, after receiving his BD degree in Edinburgh in 1939, MacGregor was ordained to the ministry in the Church of Scotland. In 1968, while in the United States, he was ordained deacon and priest in the Episcopal Church. A few days after his Episcopal ordainment, he was named canon of Saint Paul's Cathedral in Los Angeles.

== Career ==
From 1949 to 1955 MacGregor served as the first Rufus Jones Professor of philosophy and religion at Bryn Mawr College. In 1957, he became an American citizen. In 1960 MacGregor was appointed Dean of the Graduate School of Religion at the University of Southern California, where he taught until 1975, having been appointed Distinguished Professor in 1966.

MacGregor has been described as "one of the most distinguished Christian theologians to defend the reincarnation concept."

In 1967, the Commonwealth Club of San Francisco honored MacGregor's book, The Hemlock and the Cross: Humanism, Socrates and Christ, as the year's best nonfiction work by a California author.

== Personal life ==
MacGregor married Elizabeth Sutherland McAllister on August 14, 1941, at St Giles' Cathedral in Edinburgh.They had two children together, Marie Geddes (born 1944) and Martin Gregor Geddes (born 1946); Elizabeth predeceased her husband in 1994.

MacGregor died on 9 October 1998.

== Selected works ==
- MacGregor, Geddes (1989). Dictionary of Religion and Philosophy. Description. Paragon House, New York. ISBN 1-55778-441-8
- MacGregor, Geddes (1980). The Nicene creed, illumined by modern thought. Grand Rapids: Eerdmans. ISBN 0802818552. OCLC 1056603736.
- MacGregor, Geddes (1980). Scotland, an intimate portrait. Boston: Houghton Mifflin. ISBN 9780395562369. OCLC 229200688.
  - Also published as: MacGregor, Geddes (1980). Scotland forever home: an introduction to the Homeland for American and other Scots. Dodd, Mead. ISBN 9780396078043. OCLC 5706550.
- MacGregor, Geddes (1978). Reincarnation in Christianity: a new vision of the role of rebirth in Christian thought. Wheaton, Illinois: Theosophical Publishing House. ISBN 9780835605045. OCLC 3345339.
- MacGregor, Geddes (1968). A literary history of the Bible: from the Middle Ages to the present day. Nashville: Abingdon Press. OCLC 1089517366.
- MacGregor, Geddes (1966). God beyond doubt: an essay in the philosophy of religion. Lippincott. OCLC 378785.
- MacGregor, Geddes (1963). The hemlock and the cross: Humanism, Socrates, and Christ. Philadelphia: Lippincott. OCLC 1021301854.
- MacGregor, Geddes (1979), Gnosis: A Renaissance in Christian Thought A Quest Book}

=== Speculative ===
MacGregor stated in 1979 that he wrote only one "speculative novel":

- MacGregor, Geddes (1954). From a Christian Ghetto: Letters of Ghostly Wit, Written A.D. 2453. London, New York: Longmans, Green. OCLC 2772825.
