= Michael Goulder =

British biblical scholar (1927–2010)

Michael Douglas Goulder (31 May 1927 – January 6, 2010) was a British biblical scholar who spent most of his academic life at the University of Birmingham where he retired as Professor of Biblical Studies in 1994. He was perhaps best known for his contributions to the Synoptic Problem, and specifically the Farrer hypothesis, which postulates Markan priority but dispenses with the Q document, suggesting instead that Luke knew the contents of Matthew. Goulder was also associated with the theory that the evangelists were highly creative authors, and that Matthew and Luke had only minimal source material. Goulder later admitted that his analogy comparing Matthean expansions of Mark to Midrash was untenable, and modern scholarship of the Farrer hypothesis has abandoned the idea that Matthew invented most of the content in the double tradition.

In recent years, he wrote widely on a theory of Christian origins that sees a fundamental opposition between Paul the Apostle on one side and the Jerusalem Christians Peter and James, Jesus' brother, on the other. This has been seen as reviving a hypothesis proposed by 19th century Hegelian philosopher and theologian Ferdinand Christian Baur of the Tübingen school.

Goulder was an unusual biblical scholar in that he had expertise in both testaments. He published extensively over a twenty-year period on a variety of Old Testament topics, but especially the Psalms. His works in this area aimed among other things to discover the historical contexts in which individual psalms were used in worship, employing comparisons with the traditions behind other parts of the Hebrew Bible such as the Pentateuch. Despite some scholarly criticisms of his conclusions, Goulder has been described as "a renowned leader in the study of the Hebrew Psalter".

Educated at Eton followed by Trinity College, Cambridge, where he took a degree in classics, he was ordained in Hong Kong by Bishop Ronald Hall, having gone out there originally in pursuance of secular employment. Having not received any formal theological training, he returned to England and studied under Austin Farrer at Trinity College, Oxford, while serving a curacy at the university church. After a number of years of parochial ministry in Withington, Manchester he returned to Hong Kong as principal of the Union Theological College there before taking up a post at Birmingham University's Extra Mural Department. Some years later he returned to Trinity to give the Speaker's lectures at Trinity College, Oxford in 1969–71 on St. Matthew's method of writing the gospel and, in the process, dispensing with Q, for which he was awarded a Doctorate by the university. In Birmingham he ran lecture courses for clergy but it was following an invitation to give lectures back in Hong Kong that he decided to resign his orders as a priest which he did in 1981, though he never became an aggressive atheist. Goulder was a Fellow of the Committee for the Scientific Examination of Religion (CSER) which is a division of the Council for Secular Humanism and became President of Birmingham Humanists in 1993 shortly before retiring from academic life.

== Publications ==
=== Books ===
- Type and History in Acts, London: SPCK, 1964.
- Midrash and Lection in Matthew, London: SPCK, 1974.
- The Evangelists' Calendar: A Lectionary Explanation of the Development of Scripture, London: SPCK, 1978.
- The Psalms of the Sons of Korah. JSOT Supplement 20. Sheffield: JSOT Press, 1982.
- Why Believe in God?, with John Hick. London: SCM Press, 1983.
- The Song of Fourteen Songs. JSOT Supplement 36. Sheffield: JSOT Press, 1986.
- Luke: A New Paradigm. Journal for the study of the New Testament Supplement, 20. Sheffield: JSOT Press, 1989 [two volumes]
- The Prayers of David (Psalms 51-72). Studies in the Psalter, II, JSOT Supplement 102. Sheffield: Sheffield Academic Press, 1990.
- A Tale of Two Missions, London: SCM Press 1994 [US publication: St. Paul versus St. Peter: A Tale of Two Missions, Louisville, KY: Westminster/John Knox Press, 1995]
- St. Paul versus St. Peter: A Tale of Two Missions, London: SCM Press 1994
- The Psalms of Asaph and the Pentateuch. Studies in the Psalter, III. JSOT Supplement 233. Sheffield: Sheffield Academic Press, 1996.
- The Psalms of the Return (Book V, Psalms 107-150). Studies in the Psalter, IV. JSOT Supplement 258, Sheffield: Sheffield Academic Press, 1998.
- Paul and the Competing Mission in Corinth, Peabody, MA: Hendrickson, 2001.
- Isaiah as Liturgy, Aldershot: Ashgate, 2004.
- Five Stones and a Sling: Memoirs of a Biblical Scholar, Sheffield: Sheffield Phoenix Press, 2009.

For articles and chapters consult the comprehensive bibliography compiled by Mark Goodacre, linked below.
