= Alan Cameron (classicist) =

British classical scholar (1938 – 2017)

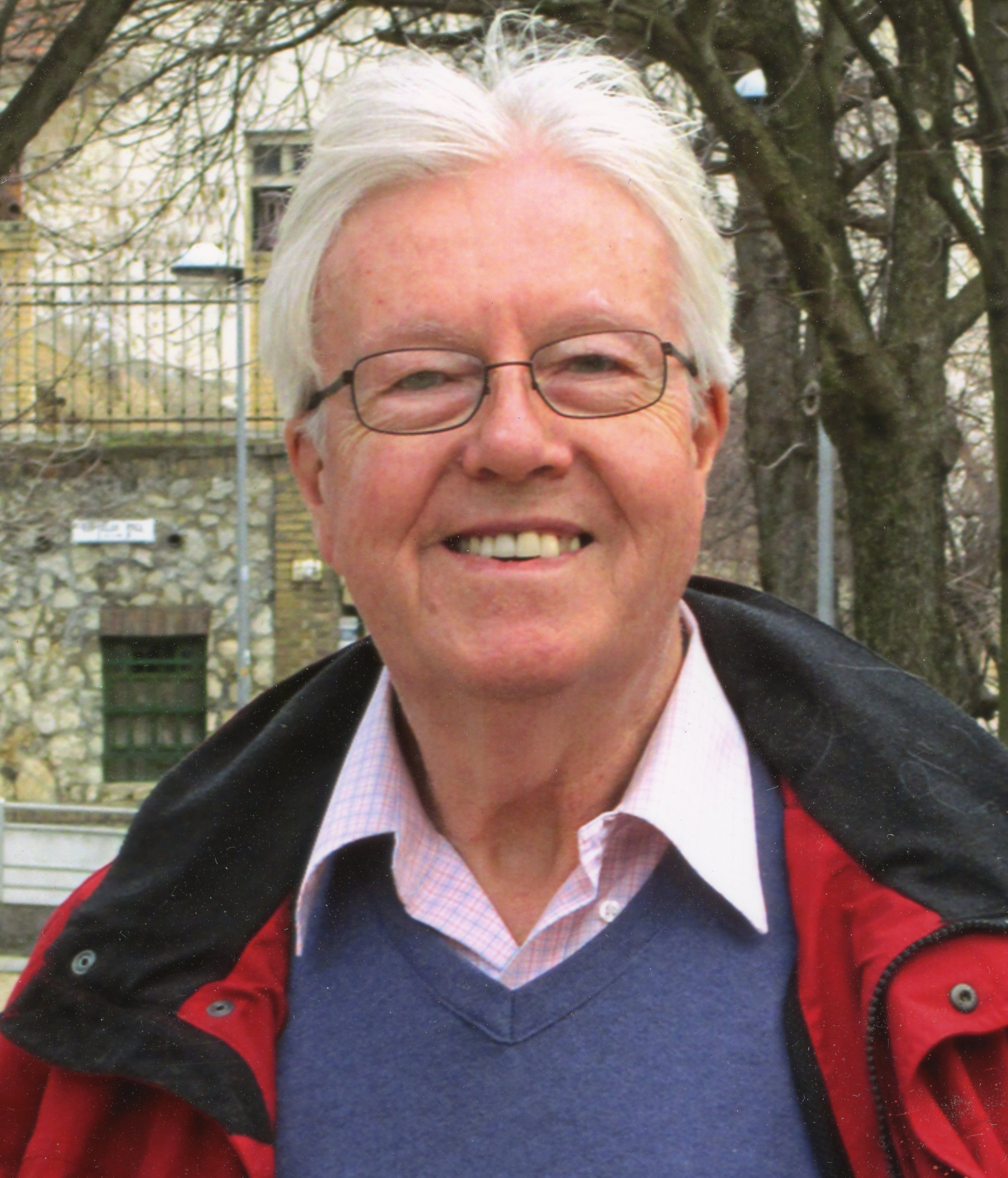
- Cameron in 2013
- Born: Alan Douglas Edward Cameron; 13 March 1938; Windsor, Berkshire, England
- Died: 31 July 2017 (aged 79); New York, US
- Citizenship: British; U.S.
- Spouse(s): Dame Averil Cameron (married 1962–1980); Carla Asher (married 1998)

Academic work
- Discipline: Classics
- Sub-discipline: Philology; Latin; Latin literature; Roman poetry; Ancient Greek literature; Late antiquity
- Institutions: University of Glasgow; Bedford College, London; King's College London; Columbia University

Alan Douglas Edward Cameron, FBA (13 March 1938 – 31 July 2017) was a British classicist and academic. He was Charles Anthon Professor Emeritus of the Latin Language and Literature at Columbia University, New York. He was one of the leading scholars of the literature and history of the later Roman world and at the same time a wide-ranging classical philologist whose work encompassed above all the Greek and Latin poetic tradition from Hellenistic to Byzantine times but also aspects of late antique art.

== Life and career ==
Cameron was educated at St. Paul's School, London (1951–1956). He went on to New College, Oxford, earning a first class in Honour Moderations (1959) and Literae Humaniores (1961). He was married, from 1962 to 1980, to Averil Cameron, with whom he had a son and a daughter. In 1998 he married Carla Asher, who survives him.

He began his academic career as a lecturer at the University of Glasgow (1961). He then became a Lecturer and then a Reader in Latin at Bedford College, London (1964–1972). From 1972 to 1977 he held the Chair of Latin at King's College London. He went to Columbia University as Charles Anthon Professor in 1977.

Cameron was elected a Fellow of the British Academy (FBA) in 1975. He became a Fellow of the American Academy of Arts and Sciences in 1978 and a Fellow of the American Philosophical Society in 1992. In March 1997 he was awarded the American Philological Association's Goodwin Award. In 2005, he received Columbia University's Lionel Trilling Award.

In 2013, he was awarded the Kenyon Medal for Classical Studies and Archaeology of the British Academy. The award dedication read as follows:

Alan Cameron has produced a major series of books on various aspects of the later Graeco-Roman world, from early Hellenistic times to the late Empire. He has a remarkable flair for synthesising literary with social and political history, at the same time clarifying the nature and relationships of the sources, and he regularly subjects long-accepted doctrines to examination and challenge. For students of Hellenistic poetry his Callimachus and His Critics (1995) has become a central point of reference, while his work on the Palatine Anthology, The Greek Anthology: From Meleager to Planudes (1993) threw much new light on the transmission of that great composite collection of epigrams. Other major works have included Claudian: Poetry and Propaganda at the Court of Honorius (1970), Greek Mythography in the Roman World (2004), and most recently The Last Pagans of Rome (2011).

He also published about 200 scholarly articles on a wide range of subjects related to the ancient world.

Cameron died in New York on 31 July 2017, at the age of 79.

== Selected works ==
Cameron's books include:

- Claudian: Poetry and Propaganda at the Court of Honorius (1970) ISBN 9780198143512
- Porphyrius the Charioteer (1973) ISBN 9780198148050
- Circus Factions: Blues and Greens at Rome and Byzantium (1976) ISBN 9780198148043
- Barbarians and Politics at the Court of Arcadius (May 1992) (with Jacqueline Long and Lee Sherry)
- The Greek Anthology: From Meleager to Planudes (1993) ISBN 9780198140238
- Callimachus and his Critics (1995) ISBN 9780691043678
- Greek Mythography in the Roman World (2004) ISBN 9780195171211
  - reviewed by T P Wiseman in the Times Literary Supplement, 13 May 2005 page 29
- The Last Pagans of Rome (2011) ISBN 9780199959709
  - reviewed by Peter Brown in the New York Review of Books, 7 April 2011
- Wandering Poets and Other Essays in Late Antique Poetry and Philosophy (2015) ISBN 9780190268947
