= Austin Farrer =

English Anglican priest and scholar (1904–1968)

The Reverend Austin Farrer FBA
- Born: Austin Marsden Farrer; 1 October 1904; Hampstead, London, England
- Died: 29 December 1968 (aged 64); Oxford, England
- Office: Warden of Keble College, Oxford (1960–1968)
- Spouse: Katharine Farrer (m. 1937)

Ecclesiastical career
- Religion: Christianity (Anglican)
- Church: Church of England
- Ordained: 1928 (deacon); 1929 (priest)

Academic background
- Education: Balliol College, Oxford; Ripon College Cuddesdon
- Influences: Thomas Aquinas; John Macmurray

Academic work
- Discipline: Philosophy; theology; biblical studies
- Sub-discipline: Metaphysics; New Testament studies; philosophical theology
- School or tradition: Anglo-Catholicism; neo-Thomism
- Institutions: St Edmund Hall, Oxford; Trinity College, Oxford; Keble College, Oxford
- Doctoral students: Geddes MacGregor
- Notable students: Michael Goulder; Donald M. MacKinnon
- Notable ideas: Farrer hypothesis
- Influenced: H. E. J. Cowdrey; Michael Goulder; Basil Mitchell

Austin Marsden Farrer (Note: Pronounced /ˈfærər/.) (1 October 1904 – 29 December 1968) was an English Anglican philosopher, theologian, and biblical scholar. His activity in philosophy, theology, and spirituality led many to consider him one of the greatest figures of 20th-century Anglicanism. He served as Warden of Keble College, Oxford, from 1960 to 1968.

== Life ==
Farrer was born 1 October 1904, the only son of the three children of Augustine and Evangeline Farrer, in Hampstead, London, England. His father was a Baptist minister and Farrer was brought up in that faith. He went to St Paul's School in London where he gained a scholarship to Balliol College, Oxford. Encouraged by his father to value scholarship, he nevertheless found the divisions within the Baptist church dispiriting, and while at Oxford he became an Anglican. Finding his spiritual home at St Barnabas Church in Oxford, his theology and his spirituality became profoundly Anglo-Catholic, although centred on the Book of Common Prayer. After gaining a First in Classical Moderations in 1925 he also achieved a First in Literae Humaniores (or 'Greats', a combination of philosophy and Greek and Roman history) in 1927, he went up to Cuddesdon Theological College where he trained alongside the future Archbishop of Canterbury, Michael Ramsey.

He served a curacy in Dewsbury, West Yorkshire, after which he was invited to become chaplain and tutor at St Edmund Hall, Oxford, in 1931 (a post he held until 1935). Farrer was a Fellow and Chaplain of Trinity College, Oxford, from 1935 to 1960. In 1937, he married Katharine Dorothy Newton, (daughter of the Rev. Frederick Henry Joseph Newton), who would become a mystery novelist. They had one child together in 1939, a daughter Caroline, who became an ecclesiastical embroiderer.

On the death of Oliver Quick in 1959, the Regius Professorship of Divinity became vacant and Farrer's name was widely canvassed. However, his typological approach to the reading of scripture, notably in his books on Mark and the Book of Revelation, was out of the mainstream of biblical scholarship, and his article "On Dispensing with Q" (one of the supposed lost sources of the Gospels) raised a furore on both sides of the Atlantic. Henry Chadwick was appointed instead. The following year, Farrer was appointed as Warden of Keble College, Oxford, a post which he held until his death on 29 December 1968, aged 64.

After Farrer's sudden death, Spencer Barrett as Sub-Warden presided over the change of college statute which removed the requirement for Keble College's Warden to be an Anglican clergyman. However, in the event the Warden appointed to succeed Farrer, Dennis Nineham, was another clergyman.

Farrer is buried in Holywell Cemetery, Oxford.

== Work ==
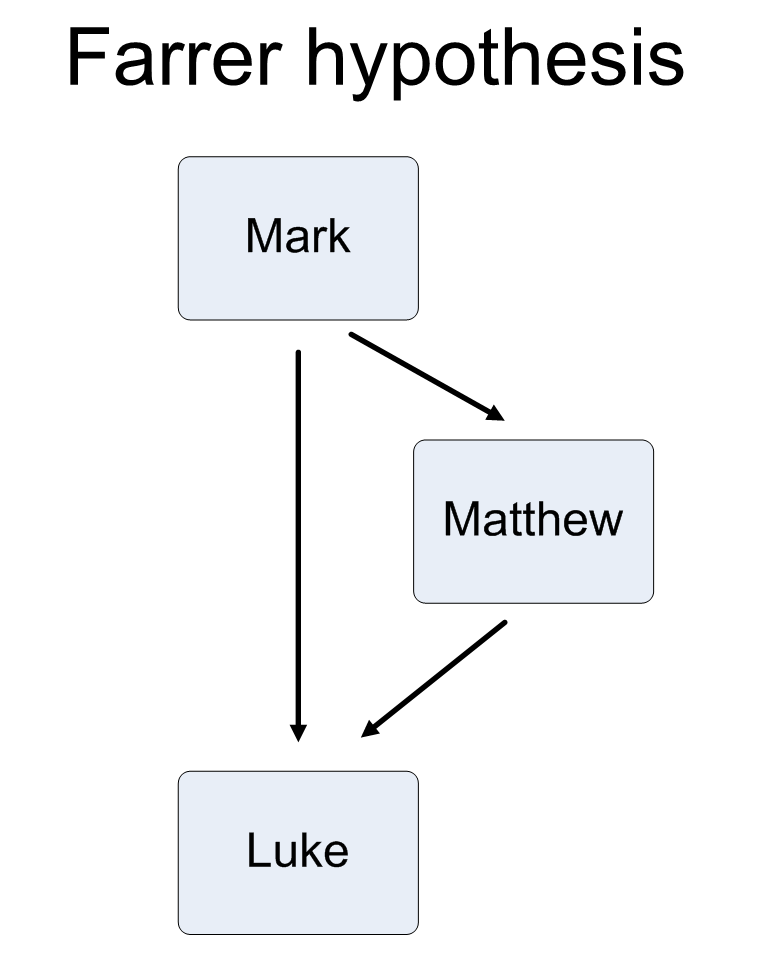
According to the Farrer hypothesis Mark was written first. The Gospel of Matthew was written using Mark as a source. Then the Gospel of Luke was written using both Mark and Matthew.

Apart from his biblical scholarship, which was considered maverick, Farrer's work was mainly philosophical, though again he was out of the mainstream. He was not influenced by the empiricism of such contemporaries as John Wisdom, Gilbert Ryle, and A. J. Ayer. The "Metaphysicals", as his small group of fellow thinkers were called, were of an entirely different temper. His thinking was essentially Thomist, not only in his being heavily influenced by Thomas's thought but also in the dialogical way in which he presents his arguments, playing as he said, "out of dummy" (a term from the game of bridge) the views and objections of real or imaginary opponents of the thesis he was advancing at the time. His desire to be fair resulted in his almost never being sharp with his opponents.

One of his closer friends was C.S. Lewis, a Christian apologist who dedicated his book Reflections on the Psalms to him. Farrer took the last sacraments to Lewis before his death. Others included J. R. R. Tolkien and Dorothy Sayers. Since his death, Farrer has been more studied and more admired in the United States than in his own country.

His major contribution to Christian thought is his notion of "double agency", that human actions are fully our own but also are the work of God, though perfectly hidden. He described God for such purposes as "intelligent act".

He presented his own solution to the synoptic problem, the so-called Farrer hypothesis in a short essay entitled "On Dispensing with Q". Q was the hypothetical source of those parts of Luke's and Matthew's gospel which are not in Mark but which are pretty much identical. He argued against the possibility of reconstructing Q noting that while it might have been impossible to reconstruct Mark from the other gospels had it been lost, Mark had not been lost. "I have a copy of it on my desk." His making short work of such an established hypothesis infuriated many scholars and may have contributed to his not being made Regius Professor of Divinity. Michael Goulder was both a pupil and a notable defender of his thesis.

His scepticism about much orthodox scholarship extended to a typically short but powerful critique of the German collection of essays Kerygma and Myth whose major contributor was Rudolf Bultmann. He averred, against them, that without the concept of miracle, the Christian project was fatally flawed, preferring the forms of existential defence of the faith of such as Gabriel Marcel to that of the Germans. His teasing style is indicated by his suggestion that Bultmann had freed the gospel from its fetters by amputating its limbs.

He was known as a preacher and several books of his sermons were printed, all but one posthumously. His style was always to be generous to the despisers of the faith, illuminating his defences with glimpses into his own spiritual life.

== Bibliography ==
His books included several on Mark, two commentaries on the book of Revelation, a study of the Temptations, entitled The Triple Victory (an Archbishop of Canterbury's Lent Book), philosophical works such as The Freedom of the Will, Finite and Infinite and Faith and Speculation, the apologetic books A Science of God (a Bishop of London's Lent Book) and Saving Belief, a defence of the goodness of God called Love Almighty and Ills Unlimited: an essay on providence and evil, a meditation on the Creed called Lord, I believe and numerous collections of sermons. Articles written by him, some of which were subsequently collected, run into dozens.

- 1943: Finite and Infinite: A Philosophical Essay. Westminster: Dacre Press, 1943 (Second Edition with a revised preface, 1959.)
- 1948: The Glass of Vision. (The Bampton Lectures; 1948). Westminster: Dacre Press. [Lectures on "the sense of metaphysical philosophy, the sense of scriptural revelation, and the sense of poetry (ix)].
- 1949: A Rebirth of Images: the making of St. John's Apocalypse. [Farrer's first commentary on Revelation]
- 1954: St. Matthew and St. Mark Edward Cadbury lectures, 1953-1954. London: Dacre Press (Second Edition, 1966)
- 1954: The Crown of the Year (chapel sermons)
- 1955: On Dispensing with Q, in Dennis E. Nineham (ed.): Studies in the Gospels: Essays in Memory of R. H. Lightfoot, Oxford, pp. 55–88.
- 1958: The Freedom of the Will: The Gifford Lectures delivered in the University of Edinburgh, 1957. London: Adam and Charles Black, 1958. (Second Edition, including a ‘Summary of the Argument,’ New York: Scribners, 1960.)
- 1960: A Faith of Our Own. With a Preface by C.S. Lewis.
- 1962: Love Almighty and Ills Unlimited: an essay on providence and evil, containing the Nathaniel Taylor Lectures for 1961. London: Collins
- 1964: Saving Belief: a discussion of essentials. London: Hodder and Stoughton
- 1964: The Revelation of St. John the Divine: commentary on the English text. Oxford: Oxford University Press [Farrer's second commentary on Revelation, a rewriting of his earlier Rebirth of Images]
- 1965: A Triple Victory: Christ's Temptations According to Saint Matthew. London: Faith Press, 1965
- 1966: A Science of God? London : Geoffrey Bles. Published in the United States as God is Not Dead. New York: Morehouse-Barlow, 1966. Republished, with a Foreword by Margaret M. Yee, London: SPCK, 2009
- 1967: Faith and Speculation: an essay in philosophical theology; containing the Deems Lectures 1964. London: A. & C. Black
- 1972: Reflective Faith: essays in philosophical theology; edited by Charles C. Conti. London: SPCK ("Chronological list of published writings: 1933–1973": p.[227]- 234.)
- 1973: The End of Man; [sermons edited by Charles C. Conti]. London: SPCK
- 1976: The Brink of Mystery: (sermons) edited by Charles C. Conti. London: SPCK
- 1976: Interpretation and Belief; edited by Charles C. Conti. London: SPCK ISBN 0-281-02889-3
- 1991: Austin Farrer: the Essential Sermons; selected and edited by Leslie Houlden. London: SPCK

== Notes ==
Academic offices
Preceded by Eric Abbott	Warden of Keble College, Oxford; 1960–1968	Succeeded by Dennis Nineham
