= W. S. Barrett =

English classical scholar (1914–2001)

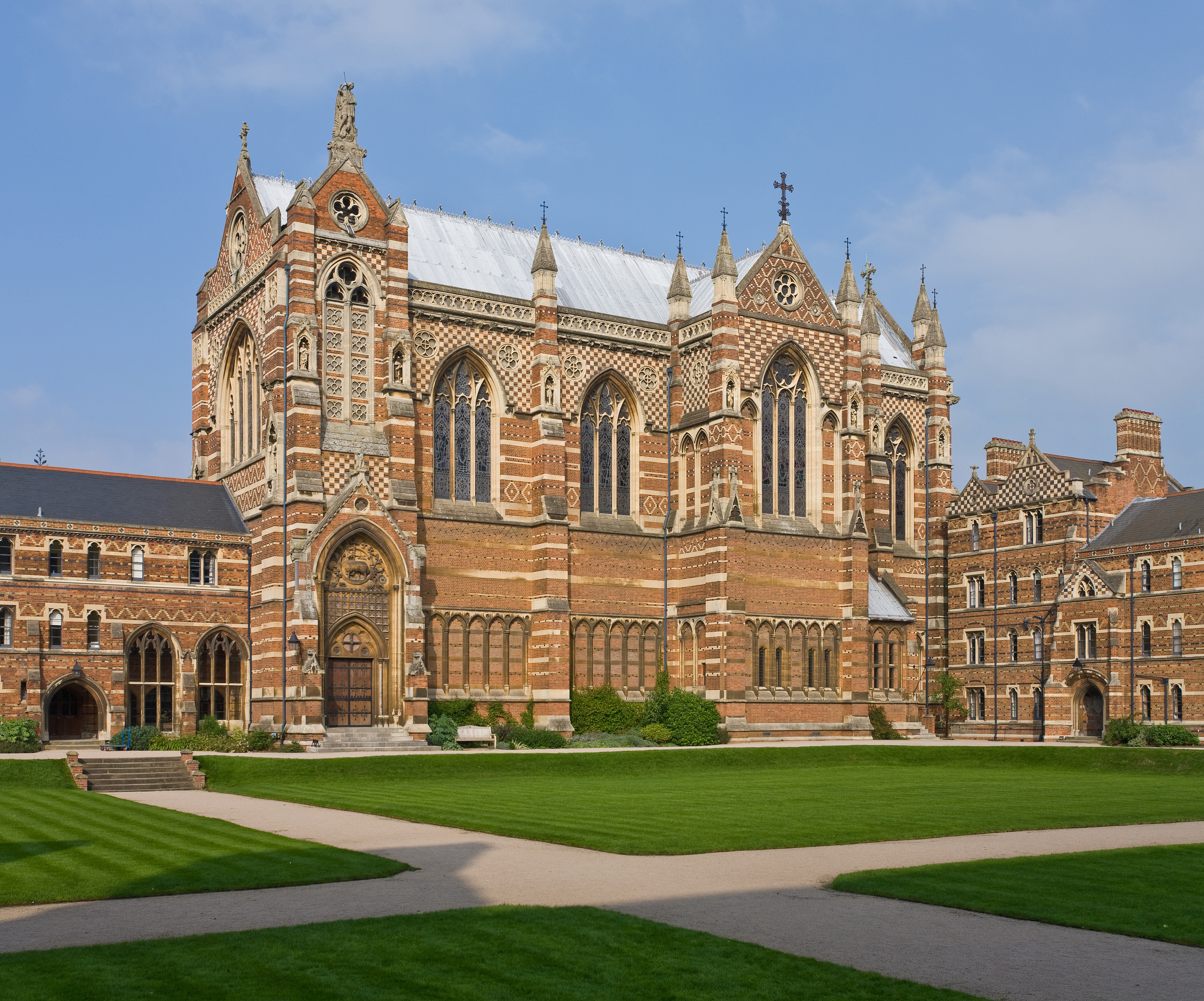
Keble College (chapel)

William Spencer Barrett FBA (29 May 1914 – 23 September 2001), usually credited as W. S. Barrett and known as Spencer Barrett, was an English classical scholar, Fellow and Sub-Warden of Keble College, Oxford, and Reader in Greek Literature in the University of Oxford. He was also a Fellow of the British Academy.

== Early life ==
The only son of William Barrett and Sarah Jessie Barrett (née Robbins), Barrett was educated at Derby School and then from 1933 at Christ Church, Oxford, where he held the Ireland and Craven Scholarship, gained a First in Classical Honours Moderations in 1934, the same year winning the Gaisford Prize for Greek Verse and the de Paravicini Scholarship, and took a First in Literae Humaniores in 1937. Also in 1937 he won the Derby Scholarship, and in 1938 the Charles Oldham Prize.

== Career ==
Barrett's first post was as a lecturer at Christ Church, Oxford, from 1938 to 1939, and then at Keble College, Oxford, where he was a Lecturer from 1939 to 1952 and Tutor in Classics from 1939 to 1981. At Keble, he was also the college's Librarian from 1946 to 1966, a Fellow of the college from 1952 to 1981 (and Honorary Fellow, from 1981 until his death), and Sub Warden, 1968 to 1976. At the University level, he was lecturer in Greek Literature, 1947 to 1966, and then Reader in Greek Literature until 1981.

As a scrupulous atheist, Barrett could not become a Fellow of Keble (although he was treated as one) until the college's statutes were changed to remove the disability in 1952. After a Warden of Keble, Austin Farrer, died suddenly in 1968, Barrett as Sub-Warden presided over the further change of statute which removed the requirement for the college's warden to be an Anglican clergyman.

Barrett's edition of Euripides' tragedy Hippolytus appeared in 1964 and was recognised as one of the most important works on Greek tragedy. It was a significant advance on its predecessors, being based on collations of ten of the sixteen mediaeval manuscripts, the other six having little independent value. Barrett said of his text that it presented "what I think the poet wrote".

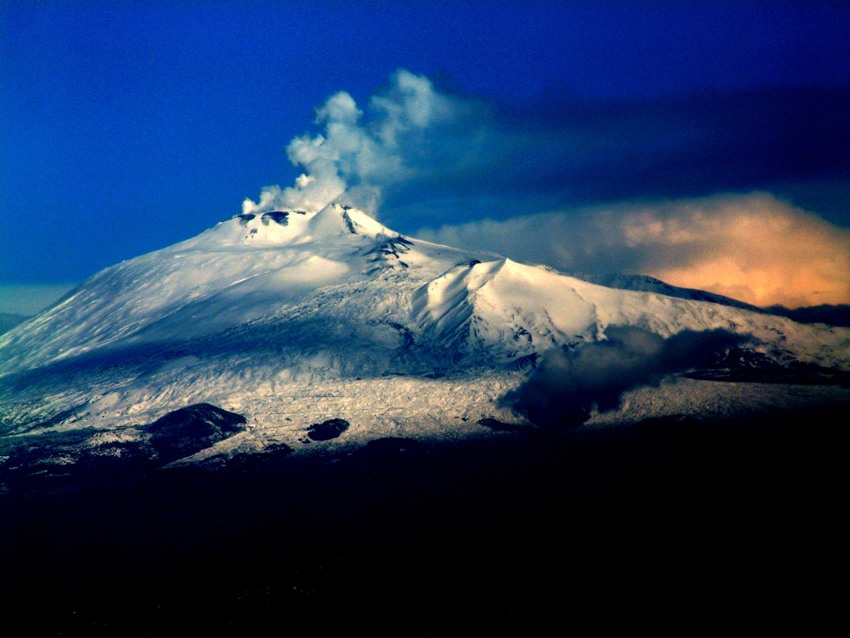
Etna

At his death, Barrett left a major work on Pindar unpublished. When an Inland Revenue tax inspector once challenged his tax return, questioning whether a computer was an allowable expense for a classicist, Barrett was able to show that for an understanding of the text of Pindar it was essential to know how Mount Etna had appeared to a sailor passing the mountain in a ship.

His other principal research interest was the Greek lyric, and he made outstanding contributions on the poets Stesichorus, Bacchylides and Simonides of Ceos. A collection of his work on Stesichorus, Pindar, Bacchylides and Euripides was edited by M. L. West of All Souls and published in 2007 under the title Greek Lyric, Tragedy, and Textual Criticism: Collected Papers.

The distinction of Barrett's scholarship was recognised by a fellowship of the British Academy.

== War service ==
During the Second World War, he served as a Temporary Civilian Officer in the Admiralty's Naval Intelligence Division, from 1942 to 1945. He claimed to derive from these years his preferred sleeping hours of 4 a.m. to mid-day, as his reports had to be ready by eight o'clock in the morning, and he found it suited him to work through the night.

== Selected publications ==
- 'Bacchylides, Asine, and Apollo Pythaieus' in Hermes 82 (1954), pp. 421–444
- Euripides, Hippolytos, edited with Introduction and Commentary (Oxford: Clarendon Press, 1964; Toronto: Oxford University Press, 1964, ISBN 0-19-814167-X)
- 'Pindar's Twelfth Olympian and the fall of the Deinomenids' in JHS 93 (1973), pp. 23–35
- 'Sophocles, Niobe' in Carden, R. (ed.) Papyrus Fragments of Sophocles (1974)
- "The Oligaithidai and their victories" in: Dawe, R. D., Diggle, J. & Easterling, E. (eds.) (1978), Dionysiaca: Nine Studies in Greek Poetry by Former Pupils Presented to Sir Denys Page on His Seventieth Birthday. Cambridge University Library, pp. 1–20
- Greek Lyric, Tragedy, and Textual Criticism: Collected Papers, edited for publication by M. L. West (Oxford & New York, 2007): papers dealing with Stesichorus, Pindar, Bacchylides and Euripides

== Family ==
In 1939, Barrett married Georgina Margaret Elizabeth, elder daughter of William and Alma Georgina Annie Hill, and they had one son and one daughter.
