= Mark Goodacre =

British scholar (born 1967)

Mark S. Goodacre
- Born: 1967 (age 58–59); Leicestershire, England, U.K.

Academic background
- Education: Oxford University

Academic work
- Discipline: Theology
- Sub-discipline: New Testament; Early Christianity
- Institutions: University of Birmingham; Duke University

Mark S. Goodacre (born 1967 in Leicestershire, England) is a New Testament scholar and Professor at Duke University's Department of Religion. He has written extensively on the Synoptic Problem; he defends the Farrer hypothesis, and thus accepts Markan priority but rejects Q.

== Biography ==
Mark Goodacre’s first job was a paperboy at age 11.

Goodacre received his MA, M.Phil, and DPhil at the University of Oxford, and has been at Duke University since 2005.

Goodacre has written extensively on the Synoptic Problem; he defends the Farrer hypothesis, and thus accepts Markan priority but rejects Q. He is the author of The Case Against Q: Studies in Markan Priority and the Synoptic Problem and Thomas and the Gospels: The Case for Thomas's Familiarity with the Synoptics. Goodacre’s book The Fourth Synoptic Gospel: John’s Knowledge of Matthew, Mark, and Luke argues that John was aware of and utilized all three Synoptics.

He has also been a consultant for numerous television and radio shows related to the New Testament, such as the 2001 BBC series Son of God and the 2013 mini-series The Bible.

== Reception ==
Goodacre has been described as the leading advocate of the Farrer Hypothesis, which is currently enjoying growing popularity among Biblical scholars. Simon Joseph writes that The Case Against Q brought an end to the “exuberant hegemony” of the Two-source hypothesis. Hugo Mendez credits Goodacre with transforming the way a generation of scholars view the Synoptic Gospels, the Gospel of Thomas, and the Gospel of John. Matthew Thiessen described The Fourth Synoptic Gospel as the ‘most most coherent, clear, and convincing’ case by a scholar for the Gospel of John’s knowledge and use of the three Synoptic Gospels.

== Works ==
- Goodacre, Mark S. (1996). Goulder and the Gospels: An Examination of a New Paradigm. Sheffield: Sheffield Academic Press. ISBN 9781850756316.
- ——— (2001). The Synoptic Problem: A Way Through the Maze. London: T & T International. ISBN 9780567080561.
- ——— (2002). The Case Against Q: Studies in Markan Priority and the Synoptic Problem. Harrisburg, PA: Trinity Press International. ISBN 9781563383342.
- ——— (2012). Thomas and the Gospels: The Case for Thomas' Familiarity with the Synoptics. London & Grand Rapids, MI: SPCK & Eerdmans. ISBN 978-0-80286-748-3.
- ——— (2025). The Fourth Synoptic Gospel: John's Knowledge of Matthew, Mark, and Luke. Grand Rapids, MI: SPCK & Eerdmans. ISBN 9781467462716.
