= Michael Jacobs (physician) =

British medical practitioner (born 1964)

Sir Michael Graham Jacobs (born 18 January 1964) is a British physician and the incumbent Warden of Keble College, Oxford. He has been a consultant in infectious diseases at the Royal Free London NHS Foundation Trust since 2000.

== Early life and education ==
Born in 1964, Jacobs studied medicine at St John's College, Oxford, graduating with a BA in 1985, and then completed his medical degrees at St Bartholomew's Hospital Medical School in 1988.

== Career ==
Jacobs worked in London hospitals between 1988 and 1990, then in Cambridge between 1990 and 1991, before returning to London as the medical registrar at Ealing Hospital and Hammersmith Hospital (1991–94). Between 1994 and 1998, he was a Wellcome Research Training Fellow; he completed a PhD at Imperial College London, which was awarded in 2000. He was a specialist registrar in infectious and tropical diseases at Northwick Park Hospital (1998–99) and then a specialist registrar in infectious diseases and general medicine at Hammersmith Hospital until 2000. That year, he was a registrar at Guy's Hospital and St Thomas's Hospital. Since 2000, he has been a consultant in infectious diseases at the Royal Free London NHS Foundation Trust.

Jacobs led the Royal Free London Trust's specialist infectious disease team when they treated three Britons with Ebola during the West Africa Ebola virus epidemic (2013–16); all of them survived. In recognition of this work, he was knighted in the 2016 New Year Honours, "for services to the prevention and treatment of infectious diseases".

In November 2021, Jacobs was announced as Warden-Elect (next "Head of House") of Keble College, Oxford to take up the role from the start of the 2022–2023 academic year. Jacobs assumed his Wardenship at the start of Michaelmas term 2022.

On the 17th June 2026, Jacobs informed the members of Keble College by e-mail that he was stepping down as Warden. No reason was given.

== Honours ==
- Knight Bachelor, 2016

Academic offices
Preceded by Jonathan Phillips	Warden of Keble College, Oxford; 2022–	Succeeded by Incumbent
