= George Barclay Richardson =

British economist (1924–2019)

George Barclay Richardson CBE (19 September 1924 – 2 July 2019) was a British economist, who was Warden of Keble College, Oxford, from 1989 to 1994.

== Life ==
George Barclay Richardson was born in 1924 and educated at Aberdeen Central Secondary School before studying at the University of Aberdeen, receiving a Bachelor of Science degree in Physics and Mathematics in 1944. After joining the Admiralty's Scientific Research Department in 1944, he was commissioned as a lieutenant in the Royal Navy Volunteer Reserve in 1945; he was then posted to the British Army on the Rhine as an intelligence officer. He then studied Politics, Philosophy and Economics (PPE) at Corpus Christi College, Oxford, graduating in 1949, and was then a student at Nuffield College, Oxford, in 1950, before becoming a Fellow of St John's College, Oxford, in 1951. He was University Reader in Economics from 1969 to 1973, as well as being an economic adviser to the United Kingdom Atomic Energy Authority between 1968 and 1974, and served as Secretary to the Delegates and Chief Executive of Oxford University Press between 1974 and 1988. His fellowship at St John's ended in 1989, when he became Warden of Keble College, Oxford. He retired from this position in 1994, having also been a Pro-Vice-Chancellor of Oxford University from 1988 to 1994.

Richardson was appointed Commander of the Order of the British Empire (CBE) in 1978. He was an Honorary Fellow of three Oxford colleges: Corpus Christi (1987), St John's (1989) and Keble (1994). His publications include papers in various academic journals, as well as Economic Theory (1964) and The Economics of Imperfect Knowledge (1998).

He died on 2 July 2019 at the age of 94.
